= Organization of Japanese forces in Southeast Asia =

Organization of Japanese forces in the South-East Asian theatre of World War II.

== Southern Army Command (Indochina HQ) ==
- Hisaichi Terauchi, Commander of Southern Army
- Seiichi Aoki, Assistant Chief of Staff Southern Army
- Kitsuju Ayabe, Vice Chief of Staff Southern Army
- Masazumi Inada, Vice Chief of Staff Southern Army
- Jo Iimura, Chief of Staff Southern Army

== Japanese Forces in Hong-Kong ==
- Takeo Ito: Commanding Officer Infantry Group 38th Division, Hong Kong
- Rensuke Isogai: Governor-General of Hong Kong
- Major-General Ichiki: Head Secretariat to Governor-General of Hong Kong
- Juro Adachi: General Officer Commanding Hong Kong Defence Force
- Major-General Arisue: Chief of Staff 23rd Army, China-Hong Kong

== Conformation of Indochina Army Garrison ==
=== Commanders-in-Chief Indochina Army Garrison ===
- Yuitsu Tsuchihashi:- Commanding General, Indo-China Garrison Army
- Hisaichi Terauchi:- Commander-in-Chief, Southern Army, Field Marshal; formally surrendered his command, Saigon, was moved to Malaya, died at his quarters, Johore Bahru, of cerebral hemorrhage

=== Chief of Staff Indochina Army Garrison ===
- Shinichi Tanaka:- Chief of Staff, Inspectorate General, LOC; inspection tour, French Indo-China, LtGen, inspection tours of French Indo-China, Thailand, Malaya, Philippines

=== Staff officers, Indochina Army Garrison ===
- Masutaro Nakai:- Staff Officer, French Indo-China Expeditionary Army

=== Commander of Transportation regiment Imperial Guards, Indochina detachment ===
- Nobuyoshi Obata:- Commanding Officer, Transportation Regiment, Imperial Guard Division, (Tokyo; French Indo-China; Malaya; Sumatra)

=== Commanders of Regular Armies, Indochina Army Garrison ===
- Yuitsu Tsuchihashi:- Commanding General, Thirty-eighth Army (Indo-China)
- Lieutenant-General Chijisima: Governor-General of Indo-China
- Shōjirō Iida: General Officer Commanding 25th Army, Indo-China

=== Unit in Indochina ===
- 11th Base Unit (Saigon)
- Fifteenth Army Detachment
- Imperial Guard Division in South French Indo-China
- 55th Division headquarters were in French Indo-China

=== Air Squadrons in Indochina area ===
- Japanese Navy units:
  - Genzan Air Group
  - Mihoro Air Group
- Japanese Army units:
  - 64th Sentai
  - 3rd Sentai:- about 430 planes, In South French Indo-China
- Kiyotake Kawaguchi, command the Kawaguchi Expeditionary Detachment struck at British Borneo.
- Utata Fukunaga : Commanding Officer 16th Field Transport Command, Malaya
- Lieutenant-General Inoue: General Officer Commanding 94th Division, Malaya
- Teizo Ishiguro Led the Twenty-ninth Army (with 94th Division, etc.): Malay Peninsula

=== Structures of Japanese forces in Penang Region ===
- Masakichi Itami: Governor-General of Penang Region

== Organization of Japanese forces in Philippines ==
=== Operative Commanders in Philippine Campaign ===
- Masaharu Homma:- Fourteenth Army Commander, (Philippines Campaign)
- Kenzo Kitano:- 4th Division Commander, from Shanghai to Philippines campaign
- Makino Shiro:- 16th Division Commander (Leyte)
- Sōsaku Suzuki:- Thirty-fifth Army Commander (Central and Southern Philippines), killed in action
- Yuitsu Tsuchihashi:- 48th Division Commander (Philippines operation)
- Tadasu Kataoka:- 1st Division Chief
- Tsuyuo Yamagata:- 26th Division Commander
- Shigenori Kuroda:- Fourteenth Army Commander
- Shinpei Fukuei:- led the 102nd Division
- Shizuo Yokoyama:- led the 8th Division (Shinbu Group)
- Rikichi Tsukada:- command the 10th Division and 1st Raiding Group (Kembu Group)
- Fourteenth Area Army (Shobu Group)
- Tomoyuki Yamashita:- Twenty-fifth Army Commander, (took Singapore, conquered Bataan and Corregidor), also Fourteenth Area Army Commander, arrived Manila, directed Philippines Campaign, surrendered, Baguio

=== Commanding Generals of Army Units in the Philippines ===
- Yoshiharu Iwanaka: General Officer Commanding 2nd Armored Division, Philippines
- Torao Ikuta: Commandant Manila Garrison
- Masaharu Homma General Officer Commanding 14th Army, Philippines
- Takichi Hōjō: Commanding Officer 54th Independent Mixed Brigade, Philippines
- Lieutenant-General Igatu: General Officer Commanding Prisoner of War Camps Philippines
- Masatsugu Araki: Commanding Officer 79th Brigade, Philippines
- Isamu Chō: Southern Army Liaison Officer to 14th Army, Philippines
- Shinpei Fukei: General Officer Commanding 102nd Division, Philippines and General Officer Commanding 102nd Division, Philippines
- Jiro Harada: General Officer Commanding 10th Division and General Officer Commanding 100th Division, Philippines
- Yoshihide Hayashi: Director-General of Military Administration Philippines

=== Commanders of Army Air Force, during Philippines Campaign ===
- Kioji Tominaga:- Fourth Air Army Commander; arrived Manila—engaged in Philippines Campaign

=== Commanders of Japanese Army Airborne units, Philippines Campaign ===
- Rikishi Tsukada:- Commanding General, 1st Airborne Raiding Group, moved to Luzon-participated in battle for Clark Field

=== Units in Philippines ===
- 31st Special Base Unit (Manila)
- 32nd Special Base Unit (Davao)
- 33rd Special Base Unit (Cebu)
- 18th Division (Leyte Island)
- 102d Division (Visayas)
- 100th Division Davao (Mindanao)
- 30th Division Cagayan (Mindanao)
- 54th Independent Mixed Brigade Zamboanga (Mindanao)
- 55th Independent Mixed Brigade (Jolo Island)
- 4th Tank Regiment - Lieut. Colonel Kumagaya
- 7th Tank Regiment - Colonel Sonoda
- 7th Independent Tank Company - Captain Kono
- 1st Independent Tank Company - Captain Uchida
- 2nd Independent Tank Company - Captain Kurobe
- Itoh SNLF Tank Company - Major Itoh
- 2nd Tank Division - Lieut. General Iwanaka
- 8th Independent Tank Company - 1st Lt. Matsumoto
- 9th Independent Tank Company - 1st Lt. Nakajima
- Iwashita Independent Tank Company - Captain Iwashita
- Sumi Independent SP Gun Company - Captain Sumi
- 3rd Tank Brigade - Brigadier General Shigemi
- 6th Tank Regiment - Colonel Ida
- 10th Tank Regiment - Colonel Harada
- 4th Tank Brigade
- 11th Tank Regiment

=== Air Squadrons in Philippines ===
- Japanese Navy
  - First Air Fleet
  - Tainan Air Group
  - Takao Air Group
  - 204th Air Group
  - 1st Air Group
- Japanese Army
  - Fourth Air Army
  - 11th Air Fleet
  - 2nd Sentai
  - 14th Sentai
  - 30th Sentai
  - Tachikawa Air Unit (technical evaluations on captured equipment)
  - 4th Air Division
  - 7th Air Division
  - 2d Air Division

== Organization of Japanese units in Singapore ==
=== Commander in Chief, Seventh Area Army ===
- Seishirō Itagaki, Commander in Chief, Seventh Area Army (Singapore)

=== Deputy Chief of Staff, Singapore Units ===
- Kitsuju Ayabe:- Deputy Chief of Staff, Southern Army (Singapore)

=== Officers attached to Seventh Area Army HQ ===
- Kitsuju Ayabe:- assigned to Seventh Area Army Headquarters (Singapore)

=== Chief of Staff, Seventh Area Army ===
- Kitsuju Ayabe:- Chief of Staff, Seventh Area Army, till end of War

=== Chiefs of Unit 9420, Singapore ===
- Rioichi Naito:- founder of Oka Unit (Unit 9420)
- Masataka Kitagawa:- Commander of Unit 9420

=== Commanders of regular Armies, Malay Peninsula ===
- Twenty-ninth Army Commander, Teizo Ishiguro
- 94th Division, Commander Teizo Ishiguro (HQ in Malay Peninsula)
- Satoshi Kinoshita (木下敏 中将): Commander of Third Air Army was assigned to Singapore, where it controlled the 5th, 7th, and 9th Air Divisions, etc.
- Major-General Arimina: Commandant Changi Jail, Singapore
- Kitsuju Ayabe: Chief of Staff 7th Area Army, Singapore
- Shinpei Fukei: Commandant Prisoner of War Camps, Singapore
- Kenji Doihara: Commander in Chief 7th Area Army, Singapore
- Masazumi Inada: Commanding Officer 3rd Shipping Transport Command, Singapore
- Kiyotake Kawaguchi, commanded the Kawaguchi Expeditionary Detachment striking at British Borneo.
- Utata Fukunaga: Commanding Officer 16th Field Transport Command, Malaya
- Lieutenant-General Inoue: General Officer Commanding 94th Division, Malaya
- Teizo Ishiguro: Led the Twenty-ninth Army (with 94th Division, etc.): Malay Peninsula

=== Structures of Japanese forces in Penang Region ===
- Masakichi Itami: Governor-General of Penang Region

=== Operative units in Malaya area ===
- 1st Tank Regiment - Colonel Mukaida
- 6th Tank Regiment - Colonel Kawamura
- 14th Tank Regiment - Colonel Kita

=== Chiefs of Regular Armies, Singapore Campaign ===
- Tomoyuki Yamashita:- Twenty-fifth Army Commander, (took Singapore, conquered Bataan and Corregidor)

=== Japanese Units in Singapore, Andaman and Malaya ===
- 10th Special Base Unit (Singapore)
- 12th Special Base Unit (Andaman)
- 15th Base Unit (Penang)
- Seventh Area Army (Singapore) - Kenji Doihara
- Sixteenth Army
- Twenty-fifth Army
- Twenty-ninth Army

=== Japanese Army organization in Andaman/Nicobar Islands ===
- Yoshisuke Inoue: Commanding Officer 35th Independent Mixed Brigade, Andaman Islands
- Major-General Saburo Isoda: Japanese Liaison Officer to Indian National Army
- Toshio Itsuki: Commanding Officer 36th Independent Mixed Brigade, Nicobar Islands
- Hideo Iwakuro: Japanese Liaison Officer to Indian National Army

=== Japanese Air Force Commanders in Singapore ===
- Satoshi Kinoshita (木下敏 中将):- Chief of Third Air Army (HQ in Singapore)

=== Air Units in Malaya, Singapore ===
- Japanese Navy
  - Kanoya Air Group
  - Genzan Air Group
  - 22nd Koku Sentai
- Japanese Army
  - Tachikawa Air Unit (technical evaluations on captured equipment)
  - 5th Air Division
  - 7th Air Division
  - 9th Air Division

== Organization of Burmese Army Detachment ==
=== Commanders-in-Chief, Burma Area Army ===
- Masakazu Kawabe:- Commanding General, Burma Area Army
- Heitarō Kimura:- Commanding General, Burma Area Army

=== Chief of Staff, Burma Area Army ===
- Shinichi Tanaka:- Chief of Staff, Burma Area Army

=== Commanders in regular Armies, Burma Area ===
- Shinichi Tanaka:- 18th Division Commander (Burma)
- Masakazu Kawabe led the (Burma Area Army)
- Shozo Sakurai Commanded the Twenty-eighth Army
- Kōtoku Satō command the 31st Division
- Yuzo Matsuyama 56th Division, commanded by Lieutenant General
- Masabumi Yamauchi led the 15th Division
- Renya Mutaguchi, who had command of the Fifteenth Army
- Hideo Iwakuro: Chief of Staff 55th Division, Burma and Chief of Staff 28th Army, Burma
- Takeakira Isomura: Deputy Chief of Staff Burma Area Army, Burma
- Haruki Isayama, : Chief of Staff 15th Army, Burma
- Shōjirō Iida: General Officer Commanding 15th Army, Thailand-Burma
- Masaki Honda: General Officer Commanding 33rd Army, Burma
- Jiro Ichida : Vice Chief of Staff Burma Area Army
- Tuyoji Hirano,: Commanding Officer Kempeitai 25th Army, Sumatra
- Toshiji Aida : Commanding Officer Infantry Group 18th Division, Burma
- Iwaichi Fujiwara: Chief of Intelligence 15th Army, Burma
- Tadashi Hanaya: General Officer Commanding 55th Division, Burma
- Yoshihide Hayashi: Commanding Officer 24th Independent Mixed Brigade, Burma and General Officer Commanding 53rd Division, Burma

=== Operative units in Burma ===
- 1st Company/2nd Tank Regiment - First Lieut. Okada
- 14th Tank Regiment - Lieut.Colonel Ueda

=== Air Units in Burma ===
- Japanese Army units:
  - 81st Sentai
- Japanese Navy units
  - Kanoya Air Group
  - Yamada Air Group
  - Toko Air Group
  - Seaplane tender Sagara Maru
  - 22nd Koku Sentai

== Japanese Units in Thailand ==
=== Eighteenth Area Army Commander ===
- Aketo Nakamura:- Eighteenth Area Army Commander
- Shihachi Katamura:- Fifteenth Army Commander
- Aketo Nakamura: Led The Eighteenth Area Army, was stationed in Thailand
- Masachika Hirata: General Officer Commanding 22nd Division, Thailand
- Tadashi Hanaya: Chief of Staff 18th Area Army, Thailand
- Shōjirō Iida: General Officer Commanding 15th Army, Thailand
- Katsumi Adachi: General Officer Commanding 4th Special Railway Corps, Thailand
- Hitoshi Hamada: Chief of Staff 39th Army, Thailand: Deputy Chief of Staff 18th Area Army, Thailand and Second Superintendent of Railways, Thailand

== Conformation of Japanese forces in the Dutch East Indies ==
=== Commanders in Japanese forces detachment, Dutch East Indies ===
- Kenzo Kitano:- Nineteenth Army Commander (Headquarters: Amboina)
- Yuichiro Nagano:- Commander Sixteenth Army and 48th Division (Headquarters: Java)
- Moritake Tanabe:- Twenty-fifth Army and the Imperial Guard Division unit (Headquarters: Sumatra)
- Fusataro Teshima:- Second Army Commander with leading of 5th, 32nd, 35th, and 36th Divisions comprised the heart of this army.

=== Commanders in Regular Armies, Dutch East Indies Campaign ===
- Kiyotake Kawaguchi:- Brigade Commander, 35th Infantry Brigade (MajGen), after outbreak of Pacific war, participated in Borneo invasion.
- Shizuo Sakaguchi: Commanded the Sakaguchi Detachment built around three infantry battalions detached on the eastern coast of Borneo.
- Moritake Tanabe: Commanding Twenty-fifth Army (with the Imperial Guard Division, etc.) Sumatra area.
- Hitoshi Imamura: Commanding 16th Army, Java, then 8th Area Army (responsible for 17th Army in the Solomons and 18th Army in New Guinea)
- Yuichiro Nagano: Commanding 16th Army, Java
- Kumachiki Hada: Commanding 16th Army, Java
- Major-General Akashi: Commanding Officer 56th Independent Mixed Brigade, Borneo
- Masao Baba General Officer Commanding 4th Division, Sumatra and General Officer Commanding 37th Army, Borneo
- Shinichi Endo: Commanding Officer 57th Independent Mixed Brigade, Celebes
- Major-General Ishiri: Commander in Moluccas Area
- Takeo Itō: Commanding Officer 40th Independent Mixed Brigade, New Ireland Island from 8 July 1944
- Shigeo Iwabe: Commanding Officer 28th Independent Mixed Brigade, Java
- Jo Iimura: Commander in Chief 2nd Area Army, Celebes

=== Units in the Dutch East Indies ===
- 21st Special Base Unit (Surabaya)
- 22nd Special Base Unit (Balikpapan)
- 23rd Special Base Unit (Makassar)
- 25th Special Base Unit (Ambon)
- Second Area Army (in the Celebes)
- Thirty-seventh Army (in South Borneo) - Masao Baba
- 4th Tank Regiment - Lieut.Colonel Kumagaya
- 2nd Tank Regiment - Colonel Mori

=== Units in Halmahera island (Dutch East Indies) ===
- Imperial Army detachment
  - 32nd Division-Lieutenant-General Yoshiho Ishii
  - 128th Independent Mixed Brigade
- Imperial Navy detachment
  - 26th Special Base Force - Vice-Admiral Shinichi Ichinose. (It was disbanded in the late World War II)

=== Japanese Air Units in the Dutch East Indies ===
- Japanese Navy
  - Genzan Air Group
  - Tainan Air Group
  - 934th Air Fleet
  - 36th Air Fleet
