= List of air squadrons of the Imperial Japanese Army =

Air Squadrons (Air Regiments) of the Imperial Japanese Army Air Service were units of Air Groups. Typically 4-8 Air Squadrons (Sentai) made up an Air Group for the training or large-scale military operations.

== Background ==
In August 1938, a complete re-organization of the Army Air Service resulted in the creation of the Air Combat Group (飛行戦隊, Hikō Sentai), which replaced all of the former Air Battalions and Air Regiments. Each Air Combat Group was a single-purpose unit consisting typically of three Squadrons (chutai), divided into three flights (小隊, shōtai) of three aircraft each. Together with reserve aircraft and the headquarters flight, an Air Combat Group typically had 45 aircraft (fighter) or up to 30 aircraft (bomber or reconnaissance). Two or more Air Combat Groups formed an Air Brigade (飛行団, Hikōdan), which, together with base and support units and a number of Independent Squadrons, formed an Air Corps (飛行集団, Hikō Shudan). In 1942, the Air Corps were renamed Air Divisions (飛行師団, Hikō Shidan), to mirror the terminology for infantry divisions, but the structure remained the same. Two Air Divisions, together with some independent units made an Air Army (航空軍, Kōkū gun).

== List of Air Squadrons (Hiko Sentai) ==
| Name | Kanji | Formed | Dissolved | Callsign | Location, notes |
|---|---|---|---|---|---|
| 1st Air Squadron (Japan) | ja:飛行第1戦隊 (日本軍) | 1 June 1925 | 1945 | - | Kakamigahara (Gifu Prefecture) - Manchuria - China - Burma - Netherlands East Indies - Indochina - Rabaul - Solomon Islands - New Guinea - Philippines - Formosa - Takahagi, Kanto district |
| 2nd Air Squadron (Japan) | ja:飛行第2戦隊 (日本軍) | 1 May 1925 | 15 July 1945 | - | Kakamigahara (Gifu Prefecture) - China - Fukuoka Prefecture. Became 12th Independent Squadron on 15 July 1945 |
| 3rd Air Squadron (Japan) | ja:飛行第3戦隊 (日本軍) | 1 May 1925 | 1945 | - | Yokkaichi - China - Philippines - Noshiro city, Akita Prefecture |
| 4th Air Squadron (Japan) | ja:飛行第4戦隊 (日本軍) | 1 May 1925 | 1945 | - | Ashiya Town - China - Shimonoseki City, Yamaguchi Prefecture |
| 5th Air Squadron (Japan) | ja:飛行第5戦隊 (日本軍) | 1 May 1925 | 1945 | - | Tachikawa, Saitama - Dutch East Indies - Kiyosu Airfield |
| 6th Air Squadron (Japan) | ja:飛行第6戦隊 (日本軍) | 1 May 1925 | 1945 | - | Pyongyang, Korea - Daegu, Korea |
| 7th Air Squadron (Japan) | ja:飛行第7戦隊 (日本軍) | 1 May 1925 | 1945 | - | Hamamatsu (Shizuoka) - Itami (Hyogo) |
| 8th Air Squadron (Japan) | ja:飛行第8戦隊 (日本軍) | 1 May 1925 | 1945 | - | Pingtung City, Taiwan |
| 9th Air Squadron (Japan) | ja:飛行第9戦隊 (日本軍) | 1 December 1935 | 1945 | - | Nining, Korea - Nanjing, Jiangsu province |
| 10th Air Squadron (Japan) | ja:飛行第10戦隊 (日本軍) | 1 December 1935 | 1945 | - | Xiawang, Manchuria - Taipei, Taiwan |
| 11th Air Squadron (Japan) | ja:飛行第11戦隊 (日本軍) | 1 December 1935 | 1945 | - | Harbin, Manchuria - Burma - New Guinea - Takahagi, Saitama |
| 12th Air Squadron (Japan) | ja:飛行第12戦隊 (日本軍) | 1 August 1935 | 1945 | - | Gongzhuling, Manchuria - Pingtung, Taiwan |
| 13th Air Squadron (Japan) | ja:飛行第13戦隊 (日本軍) | 1 December 1937 | 1945 | - | Kakogawa, Hyogo - Wewak - Pingtung, Taiwan |
| 14th Air Squadron (Japan) | ja:飛行第14戦隊 (日本軍) | 31 August 1938 | 1945 | - | Chiayi, Taiwan - Nitta |
| 15th Air Squadron (Japan) | ja:飛行第15戦隊 (日本軍) | 1 December 1935 | 2 May 1945 | - | Xinjing, Manchuria - Saigon |
| 16th Air Squadron (Japan) | ja:飛行第16戦隊 (日本軍) | 1 December 1935 | 2 May 1945 | - | Kainami, Manchuria - Pyongyang, Korea |
| 17th Air Squadron (Japan) | ja:飛行第17戦隊 (日本軍) | February 1944 | June 1945 | - | Kagamigahara - Manila - Luzon - Los Negros - Komaki - Taiwan |
| 18th Air Squadron (Japan) | ja:飛行第18戦隊 (日本軍) | - | - | - | - |
| 19th Air Squadron (Japan) | ja:飛行第19戦隊 (日本軍) | 1 December 1941 | 1945 | - | Kita Ise - Phiilipines - Hualien Port, Taiwan |
| 20th Air Squadron (Japan) | ja:飛行第20戦隊 (日本軍) | - | - | - | - |
| 21st Air Squadron (Japan) | ja:飛行第21戦隊 (日本軍) | - | - | - | |
| 22nd Air Squadron (Japan) | ja:飛行第22戦隊 (日本軍) | - | - | - | - |

== to be added to list ==
  - No. 23 Hikō Sentai IJAAF
  - No. 24 Hikō Sentai IJAAF
  - No. 25 Hikō Sentai IJAAF was No. 10 Dokuritsu Hikō Chutai IJAAF
  - No. 26 Hikō Sentai IJAAF
  - No. 27 Hikō Sentai IJAAF
  - No. 28 Hikō Sentai IJAAF
  - No. 29 Hikō Sentai IJAAF
  - No. 30 Hikō Sentai IJAAF
  - No. 31 Hikō Sentai IJAAF
  - No. 32 Hikō Sentai IJAAF
  - No. 33 Hikō Sentai IJAAF
  - No. 34 Hikō Sentai IJAAF
  - No. 35 Hikō Sentai IJAAF
  - No. 36 Hikō Sentai IJAAF - no source
  - No. 37 Hikō Sentai IJAAF - no source
  - No. 38 Hikō Sentai IJAAF
  - No. 39 Hikō Sentai IJAAF
  - No. 40 Hikō Sentai IJAAF - no source
  - No. 41 Hikō Sentai IJAAF - no source
  - No. 42 Hikō Sentai IJAAF - no source
  - No. 43 Hikō Sentai IJAAF - no source
  - No. 44 Hikō Sentai IJAAF
  - No. 45 Hikō Sentai IJAAF
  - No. 46 Hikō Sentai IJAAF
  - No. 47 Hikō Sentai IJAAF was No. 47 Dokuritsu Hikō Chutai IJAAF
  - No. 48 Hikō Sentai IJAAF
  - No. 49 Hikō Sentai IJAAF - no source
  - No. 50 Hikō Sentai IJAAF
  - No. 51 Hikō Sentai IJAAF
  - No. 52 Hikō Sentai IJAAF
  - No. 53 Hikō Sentai IJAAF
  - No. 54 Hikō Sentai IJAAF
  - No. 55 Hikō Sentai IJAAF
  - No. 56 Hikō Sentai IJAAF
  - No. 57 Hikō Sentai IJAAF - no source
  - No. 58 Hikō Sentai IJAAF
  - No. 59 Hikō Sentai IJAAF
  - No. 60 Hikō Sentai IJAAF
  - No. 61 Hikō Sentai IJAAF
  - No. 62 Hikō Sentai IJAAF
  - No. 63 Hikō Sentai IJAAF
  - No. 64 Hikō Sentai IJAAF
  - No. 65 Hikō Sentai IJAAF
  - No. 68 Hikō Sentai IJAAF
  - No. 70 Hikō Sentai IJAAF
  - No. 71 Hikō Sentai IJAAF
  - No. 72 Hikō Sentai IJAAF
  - No. 73 Hikō Sentai IJAAF
  - No. 74 Hikō Sentai IJAAF
  - No. 75 Hikō Sentai IJAAF
  - No. 76 Hikō Sentai IJAAF - no source
  - No. 77 Hikō Sentai IJAAF was No. 8 Dokuritsu Hikō Daitai IJAAF
  - No. 78 Hikō Sentai IJAAF
  - No. 79 Hikō Sentai IJAAF - no source
  - No. 80 Hikō Sentai IJAAF - no source
  - No. 81 Hikō Sentai IJAAF
  - No. 82 Hikō Sentai IJAAF
  - No. 83 Hikō Sentai IJAAF
  - No. 84 Hikō Sentai IJAAF - no source
  - No. 85 Hikō Sentai IJAAF
  - No. 87 Hikō Sentai IJAAF
  - No. 90 Hikō Sentai IJAAF
  - No. 95 Hikō Sentai IJAAF
  - No. 98 Hikō Sentai IJAAF
  - No. 101 Hikō Sentai IJAAF
  - No. 102 Hikō Sentai IJAAF
  - No. 103 Hikō Sentai IJAAF
  - No. 104 Hikō Sentai IJAAF
  - 110th Hikō Sentai
  - No. 111 Hikō Sentai IJAAF
  - No. 112 Hikō Sentai IJAAF
  - No. 144 Hikō Sentai IJAAF
  - 170th Bombardment Group (ex-60th Hikō Sentai and 110th Hikō Sentai)
  - No. 200 Hikō Sentai IJAAF
  - No. 204 Hikō Sentai IJAAF
  - No. 206 Hikō Sentai IJAAF
  - No. 244 Hikō Sentai IJAAF
  - No. 246 Hikō Sentai IJAAF was 82nd Dokuritsu Hiko Chutai IJAAF
  - No. 248 Hikō Sentai IJAAF
  - No. 2 Dokuritsu Hikō Daitai IJAAF
  - No. 9 Dokuritsu Hikō Chutai IJAAF
  - No. 25 Dokuritsu Hikō Chutai IJAAF
  - No. 71 Dokuritsu Hikō Chutai IJAAF
  - No. 84 Dokuritsu Hikō Chutai IJAAF
  - No. 102 Dokuritsu Hikō Chutai IJAAF
  - Rikugun Koukuu Shikan Gakkō
  - Tokorozawa Rikugun Koku Seibi Gakkō
  - Akeno Rikugun Hikō Gakkō
  - Kumagaya Rikugun Hikō Gakkō
  - Tachiarai Rikugun Hikō Gakkō
  - Hamamatsu Instructing Flying Division
  - Hitachi Army Flight Training School

== See also ==
- List of air divisions of the Imperial Japanese Army
- Imperial Japanese Army Air Service
