= Fourth Air Army (Japan) =

The Fourth Air Army (Japanese: 第4航空軍, Hepburn: Kōkū gun) was a land-based aviation force of the Imperial Japanese Army. Formed in Rabaul in June 1943, consisting of the 6th and 7th Air Divisions (Hiko Shidan). The air army was responsible for covering the Solomon Islands, Dutch New Guinea and the Territories of Papua and New Guinea areas of operations. The headquarters was at Rabaul. Disestablished in January 1945.

== Origins ==
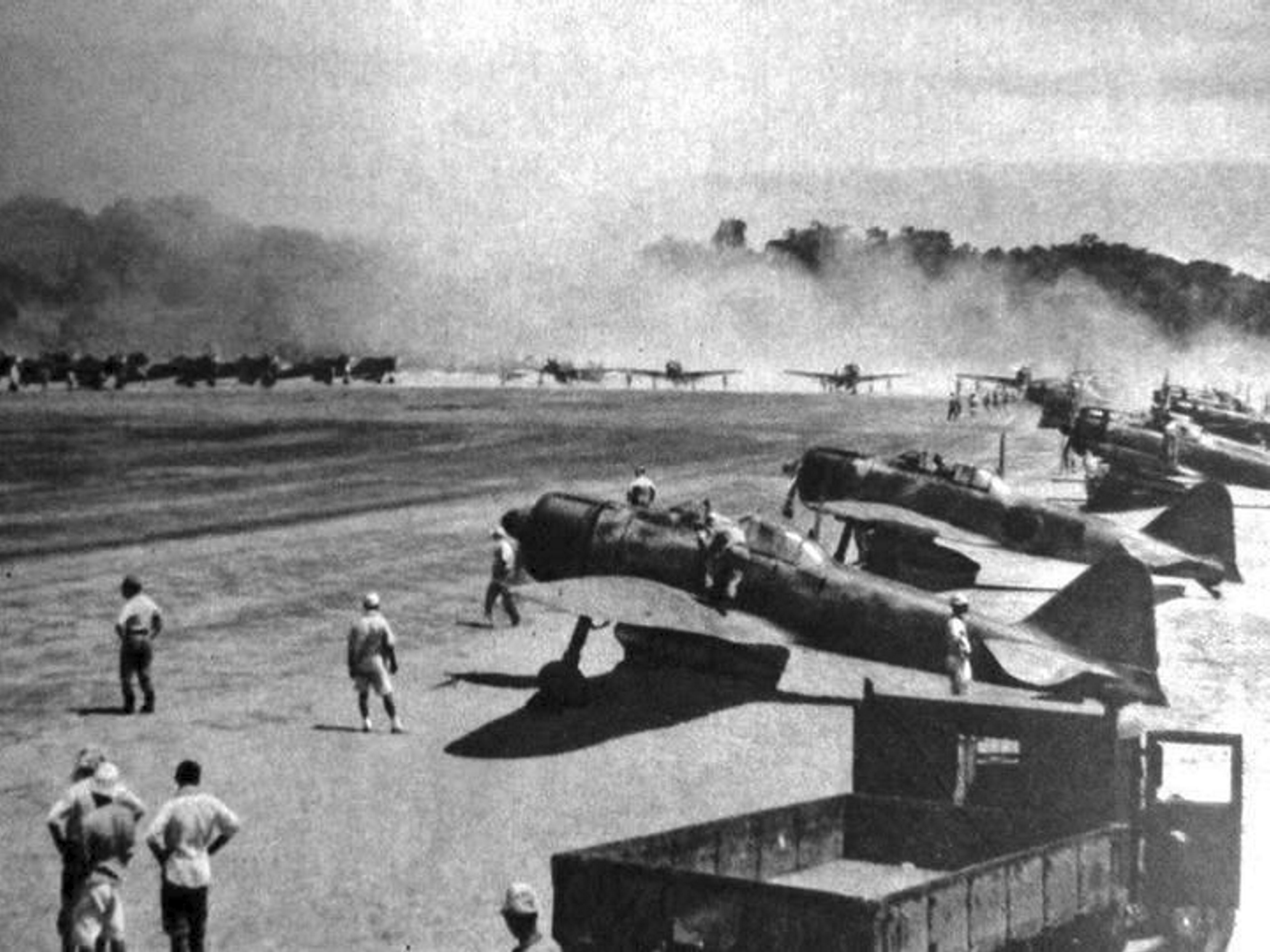
Japanese aircraft at Rabaul 1942

In August 1942, as a result of the loss in the Battle of the Tenaru at Guadalcanal and significant losses of aircraft based at Rabaul, the Imperial Japanese Navy requested the Army to send reinforcements for the air effort in the Solomon's and New Guinea. This request was initially declined as the army considered its forces were spread too thinly throughout occupied territories. The defeat of the Kawaguchi Detachment in the Battle of Edson's Ridge at the beginning of September brought about a change in the army's stance with a proposal being put forward to provide two fighter and two bomber air groups until Port Moresby was captured. With further assessment of the situation and the Kokoda Track campaign being unsuccessful, on 18 November the Army and Navy reached an agreement whereby the 6th Air Division was committed to the New Guinea front. The intention being that this would be a temporary arrangement until the front was secured and Port Moresby captured.

The first unit to arrive at Rabaul were 60 Nakajima Type 1 "Oscar" fighters of the 11th Sentai on 18 December which were later sent to New Guinea. They were followed by heavy bomber units from Burma which were deployed to New Guinea. By 4 January 1943 there were 164 army aircraft stationed in the area. They operated primarily out of Wewak and other smaller bases in New Guinea. The loss of the Battle of the Bismarck Sea showed this force to be inadequate in the face of the growing strength of the Allied air forces. To meet this gap the 68th and 78th Sentais of the 14th Air Brigade were sent to the 6th Air Division arriving in late April, followed by the 13th and 24th Sentai which arrived in late May. The 11th Sentai was relocated to Taisho, Japan.

Intelligence reports indicated that the Allies were building airfields in the New Guinea highlands at Mount Hagen and Bena Bena. These created a threat to the air bases at Wewak and Madang. To meet this change the 7th Air Division was transferred to Wewak from the Dutch East Indies on 19 June. The 7th Air Division was a relatively new unit having been created in January and the units transferred were the 59th Sentai (fighters), 5th Sentai, 7th Sentai (heavy bombers) and 61st Sentai (heavy bombers). As a result of this move a new Air Army, the 4th, was created with its headquarters based at Rabaul to command the 6th and 7th Air Divisions.

== Commanding Officers ==
=== Kumaichi Teramoto ===
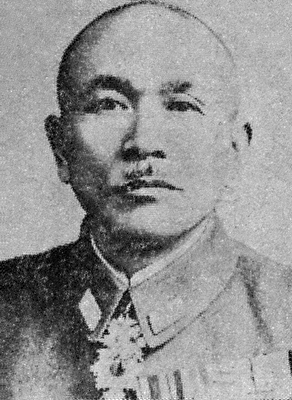
Kumaichi Teramoto

Kumaichi Teramoto joined the Imperial Japanese Army infantry in 1910. He attended the Japanese War College, graduating in 1921. His first command of the Army Air Service was the 8th Air Regiment in 1933. Eventually he was promoted to major general in command of the 2nd Air Division based in Manchukuo. For a brief time he command the 1st Air Army before being assigned to command the newly formed 4th Air Army in July 1943.

=== Kyoji Tominaga ===
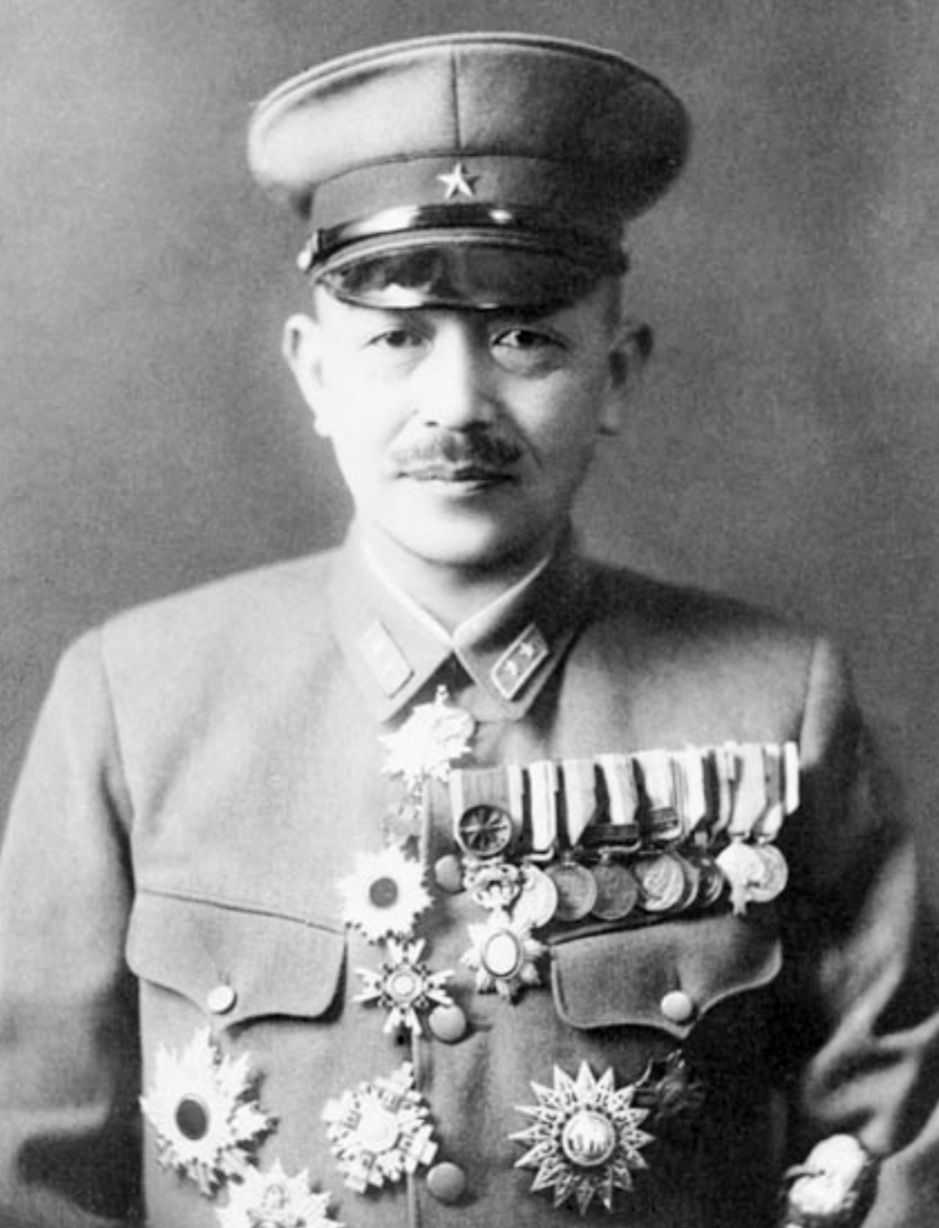
Kyoji Tominaga

Kyoji Tominaga graduated from the army academy in May 1913. Tominaga held mainly non-combat positions through his military career, reaching the rank of major general by 1939 and lieutenant general by 1941. Tominaga continued in mainly administrative roles under the Tojo cabinet until its fall in July 1944. On 30 August Tominaga became commander of the Fourth Air Force. The appointment was noted with surprise by the Emperor who asked war minister Hajime Sugiyama whether Tominaga knew anything about the air force.

== Headquarters ==
Year	Month	Day	Location
1943	July		Rabaul
			Wewak
1944	March	25	Hollandia
	April	15	Manado
	May		Manila
1945	January	16	Taiwan
	February	24	Unit disestablished

== Initial Units in 1943 ==
=== 4th Kokugun Headquarters (Lieutenant General Kunachi Teramoto) ===
Formed at Rabaul in June 1943 and under the 8th Area Army till March 1944.

=== 6th Hiko Shidan ===
6th Hiko Shidan 第6飛行師団 (Lieutenant General Giichi Itahana) was headquartered at Wewak with additional bases Madang and other minor airfields from mid-July 1943:

- 13th Sentai - 飛行第13戦隊 (Major Nagano Tsunao) - transferred from the First Air Army to the 6th Hikodan in New Guinea in May 1943
  - complement of 20 Ki-45's of which 11 were available by 31 May 1943
- 24th Sentai - 飛行第24戦隊
  - Ki-43's operating from Dagua Airfield
- 68th Sentai - 飛行第68戦隊
  - Ki-61's operating from Boram Airfield near Wewak
- 78th Sentai - 飛行第78戦隊
  - Ki-61's operating from Boram Airfield near Wewak

=== 7th Hiko Shidan ===
7th Hiko Shidan 第7飛行師団 (Lieutenant General Einosuke Sudo) was headquartered at Wewak from 7 July to 30 October 1943:

- 5th Sentai - 飛行第5戦隊
  - Ki-45 and Ki-46's based at Wewak
- 7th Sentai - 飛行第7戦隊
  - Ki-21 or Ki-49 heavy bombers
- 59th Sentai - 飛行第59戦隊
  - Ki-43's based at Dagua
- 61st Sentai - 飛行第61戦隊
  - Ki-21 or Ki-49 heavy bombers

== New Guinea ==
By the beginning of August the operational strength of the 4th Air Army was 130 of its 200 aircraft. This was under a third of its complement on paper. Illness among aircrew and lack of replacement aircraft were contributing factors in addition to the combat attrition. On 12 August the Air Army began attacking enemy air bases at Wau, Salamaua, Hagen, Bena Bena, and elsewhere in New Guinea. This prompted a retaliatory raid on Wewak and other bases between 17 and 21 August which destroyed 100 of the 4th Air Army aircraft. The operational strength was now only 30 aircraft and insufficient to hinder enemy air operations.

By September the operational strength had built up to 60-70 aircraft and the airbase at Hollandia was strengthened to provide more depth to the 4th Air Army's dispersion. In October the 7th Air Division was transferred to the 2nd Area Army which had been relocated to the East Indies and New Guinea. The 7th Air Division headquarters was transferred to Ambon Island. The 6th Air Division continued its operations out of Wewak at this time.

By the time of the enemy landings at Saidor in January 1944 the 4th Air Army had about 100 operational aircraft. These attempted to counter-attack the invasion force but were unsuccessful and by the beginning of February there were only 50 operational aircraft. To overcome this deficiency the 33rd, 45th, 60th, 75th, and 77th Sentai of the 2nd Area Army were lent to the 4th Air Army.

== Units in March 1944 ==
=== 6th Hiko Shidan ===
Remnants Headquartered at Wewak with additional bases Madang and other minor airfields

- 13th Sentai - 飛行第13戦隊
- 24th Sentai - 飛行第24戦隊
- 68th Sentai - 飛行第68戦隊
- 78th Sentai - 飛行第78戦隊

=== Loan from 2nd Kokugun ===
- 33rd Sentai - 飛行第33戦隊
  - Ki-43
- 45th Sentai - 飛行第45戦隊
  - Ki-48 light bomber
- 60th Sentai - 飛行第60戦隊
  - Ki-21 heavy bomber
- 75th Sentai - 飛行第75戦隊
  - Ki-48
- 77th Sentai - 飛行第77戦隊
  - Ki-43

== Hollandia ==
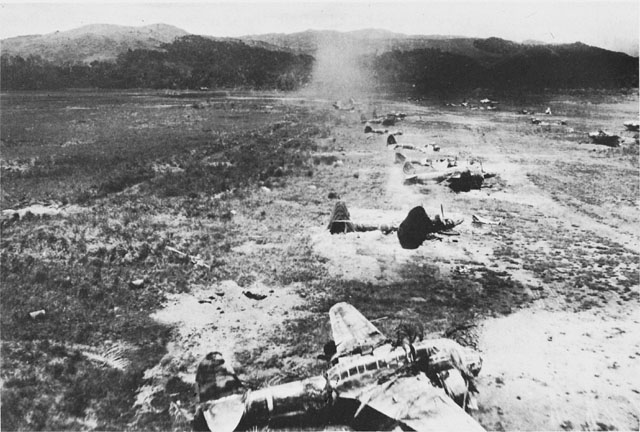
Hollandia airfield after raids by the 5th Air Force

A total of 300 aircraft had been assembled at Hollandia by 25 March of which only 150 were operational. The Fourth Army headquarters also moved there at this time. In a repeat of the enemy attack Wewak enemy aircraft attacked Hollandia in strength achieving complete surprise and destroying 150 planes on the ground. The Fourth Air Army was transferred from the 8th Area Army to the Southern Army command on 15 April. The Forth's headquarters was transferred to Manado on Sulawesi. Major Genenral Masazumi Inadana arrived at Hollandia on 11 April to take over the 6th Air Division. On 22 April the enemy captured the base and remaining aircraft effectively wiping out the 6th Air Division.

== Philippines ==
The Fourth Air Army's move to Manado also included a change to its operational area. This was expanded to include the Philippines and eastern Dutch East Indies (including Western New Guinea). Alongside it the Third Air Army was responsible for operations to the west of and including Borneo. The plan was to combine both Air Army's in the Pacific sector should a decisive battle come about. A large scale reinforcement of the 4th Air Army also to happen. The Second Air Army's 4th Division was transferred in late May to the Fourth Air Army and relocated from Manchuria to the Philippines as did the Fourth's Headquarters, which located to Manila. The Fourth's 7th Air Division continued to operate in the New Guinea theatre after the destruction of most of the 6th Air Division (disestablished at that time) and participated in the final battles of the campaign. Over 100 of the Divisions aircraft were destroyed at Halmahera on 27 July 1944. Lieutenant General Kyoji Tominaga was placed in charge of the Fourth Air Army.

The bulk of the 4th Division was deployed in central and southern Philippines in anticipation of an enemy invasion. Its task was to initially attack carriers and convoys in conjunction with the IJN's 5th Base Air Force. Once the enemy landed its focus would be to attack troop transports and concentrations. The 2nd and 4th Divisions participated in the Battle of Leyte but by the 28 October these divisions had been decimated by enemy fighters and bombing of its airfields.

With these losses and following the example of the Imperial Japanese Navy's 1st Air Fleet which was also based at Manila the Fourth Air Army began forming tokubetsu kōgekitai (特別攻撃隊), which literally means "special attack units". The term tokubetsu kōgekitai is usually abbreviated to tokkōtai (特攻隊). These units were tasked with kamikaze attacks on enemy shipping, particularly carriers. On 16 January 1945 Tominaga transferred his headquarters from Manilla to Taiwan on his own initiative. This move should have resulted in him being court-martialed but because of the intervention from Tojo, it only resulted in him being demobilised. The remaining units of the Fourth Air Army were transferred to the Third Air Army and 14th Area Army. The Fourth Air Army ceased to exist on 24 February 1945 during the Battle of Luzon.

== Combat Units in July 1944 ==
- 2nd Hiko Shidan 第2飛行師団 - based in Philippines (transferred to Third Air Army 1 January 1945)
  - Combat units
  - 6th Hikodan: Colonel Ono Monnosuke
    - 32nd Sentai (飛行第32戦隊) (Light Bomb): Major Masayoshi Okamura
    - 66th Sentai (飛行第65戦隊) (Light Bomb): Major Tatsuo Sato
    - 70th Sentai (飛行第70戦隊) (Battle): Major Katsumi Naganawa
  - 13th Hikodan: Lieutenant Colonel Rokuo Eyama
    - 65th Sentai (飛行第65戦隊) (Raid): Lieutenant Colonel Masao Ishihara
    - 28th Independent Squadron (Chief) (Wonharu): Lieutenant Colonel Shingo Kunieda
- 4th Hiko Shidan 第4飛行師団 - based in Philippines (transferred to the 14th Area Army in February 1945)
  - Independent Flight 52nd Company: Major Takeo Teshima
- 7th Hiko Shidan 第7飛行師団 - based in Dutch East Indies and New Guinea (transferred to the Third Air Army in February 1945)
  - Combat units
    - Independent Flight 73rd Company (Military Detective): Major Harunari Kanemasa
    - 13th Sentai (飛行第13戦隊) (Battle): Major Hisao Machida
    - 24th Sentai (飛行第24戦隊) (Battle): Major Koichi Shoji
    - 208th Sentai (飛行第208戦隊) (Light Bomb): Lieutenant Colonel Seiki Kashima
  - 9th Hikodan:
    - 61st Sentai (飛行第61戦隊) (Heavy Bomber): Major Shozaburo Horikawa
  - 3rd Wing Command: Colonel Tomomi Miyake
    - Independent Flight 70th Squadron (Chief): Major Kurayasu Ichikawa
    - 75th Sentai (飛行第75戦隊) (Light Bomb): Lieutenant Colonel Doi

== Special Attack Units ==
=== Shipping attack ===
- Seika Unit (精華隊, Seika-tai) - drawn from the Fourth Air Army 30th Fighter Corps, 1st Sentai (飛行第1戦隊), 11th Sentai (飛行第11戦隊), 31st Sentai (飛行第31戦隊), 71st Sentai (飛行第71戦隊), 72nd Sentai (飛行第72戦隊), 73rd Sentai (飛行第73戦隊), and 200th Sentai (飛行第200戦隊).

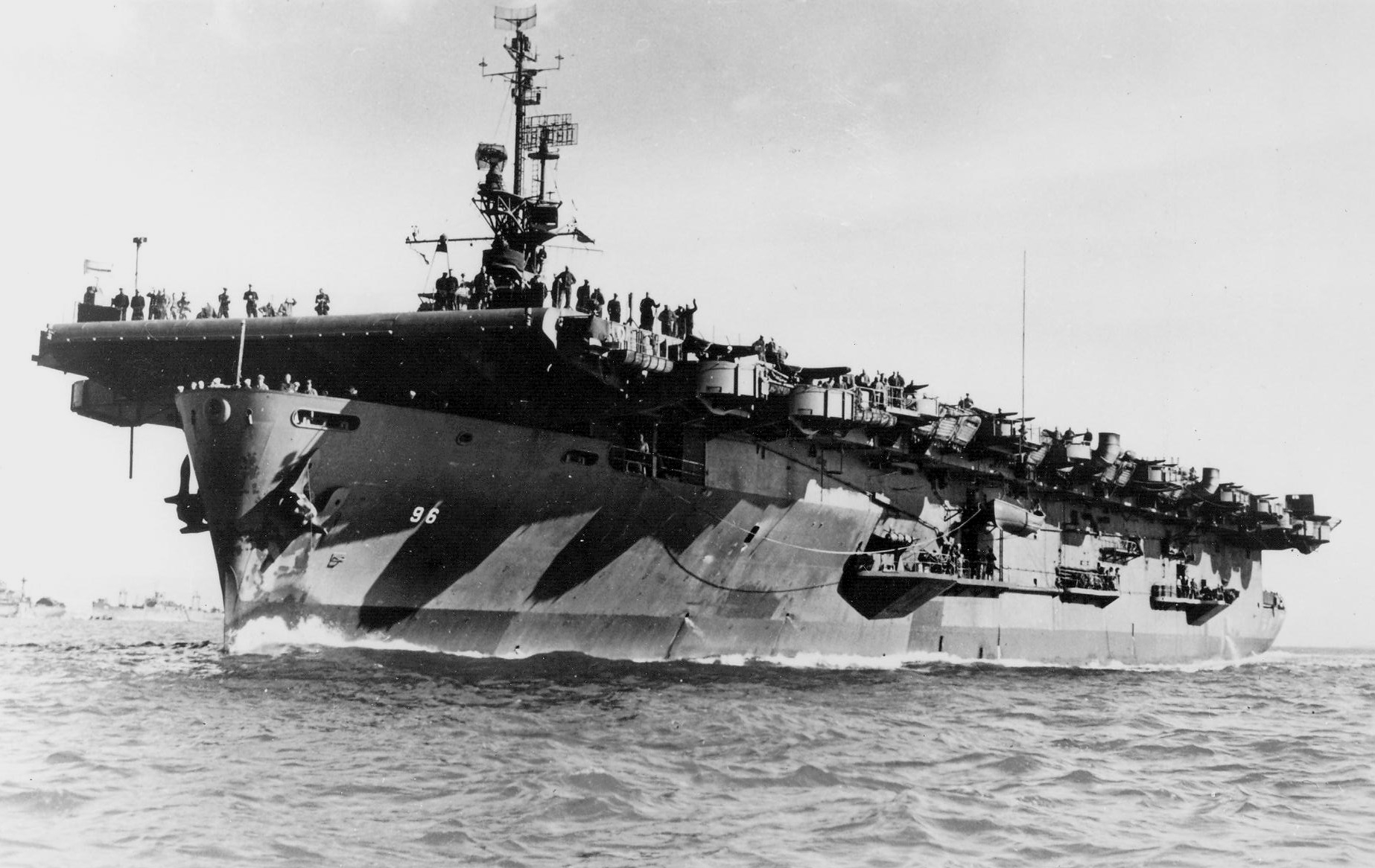
Escort carrier Salamaua damaged by Fourth Air Army kamikaze

Date	# Aircraft	Units	Model	Target	Location
17 December 1944	1	unspecified	Ki-84 Ia (maybe)	PT-75	Mindoro
20 December 1944	2	unspecified	Ki-84 Ia	Transport claimed but not proven	San Jose
25 December 1944	1		Ki-84 Ia	U.S. ship	Lingayen Gulf
8 January 1945	3	31st Sentai	Ki-43 II	Escort Carrier Kitken Bay (possibly)	Lingayen Gulf
10 January 1945	4		Ki-43 II	U.S. ship	Lingayen Gulf
12 January 1945	21	1st, 11th, 72nd, 73rd Sentai	Ki-84 Ia	U.S. ship	Lingayen Gulf
13 January 1945	2	73rd and 200th Sentai	Ki-84 Ia	Escort Carrier Salamaua	Lingayen Gulf.

=== Airborne and ground attack ===
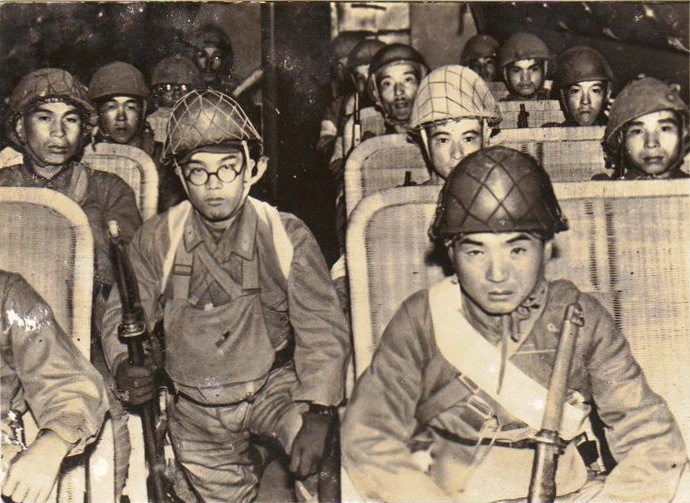
Kaoru Kuteitai in L2D

- Kaoru Detachment (薫空挺隊, Kaoru Kūteitai)

In addition to special attacks on ships, the Fourth Air Army used its Nakajima L2D transport aircraft of 208th Sentai to drop Taiwanese Takasago Volunteers, the so-called Takasago Volunteers, and the Takachiho Paratroopers (Raiding Regiments 3 and 4) onto enemy airfields.

Because of the negligible impact of bombers and fighters attacking the enemy in the Battle of Ormoc Bay caused by enemy aircraft from Leyte Island Tominaga, after consulting with Takushiro Hattori, the chief of the Operations Division of the General Staff, sought to use an airborne special attack operation to neutralise the enemy air bases. Tominaga put his proposal to General Tomoyuki Yamashita, commander of the 14th Area Army. Yamashita approved Tominaga's operation on the basis that it would assist the defence of the Philippines.

The target of the first attack with four transports was the airfield in at Brauen on 26 November but was unsuccessful with one transport making a forced landing at an enemy airfield at Valencia Airfield. The whereabouts of the remaining three aircraft were unknown.

The second operation on 6 December named Operation TE was larger with a total of 450 airborne crew members; 204 from Bayug Airfield, 72 from Bayug Airfield, 36 from Sampablo Airfield, 104 from Drag Airfield, and 44 from Tacroban Airfield. The plan was for the paratroopers to occupy the airfield along with following ground troops of the 14th Area Army. The corresponding ground operation was named Operation Japanese. Tominaga decided to put his remaining forces into "Operation Te". 30 Mitsubishi Ki-21 fighter planes, 17 Mitsubishi Ki-21 heavy bombers accompanied the transport planes. On December 6, "Operation Te" was carried out, and paratroopers and forced landings were carried out at each airfield. Of the 14 transports that went to Tacloban, 12 were shot down and two crash landed.

A total of 26 transport planes went to Bayug and San Pablo Airfields. Twenty of the transport planes survived, but all were hit by heavy anti-aircraft fire. The Japanese overwhelmed enemy resistance and occupied both airfields, destroying airfield equipment and one C-45 Expedator, five L-5 Sentinels, and 14 other aircraft on the ground. Although the operation was successful, Tominaga was disappointed that so few enemy aircraft had been destroyed.
