= 6th Air Division (Japan) =

- Active: November 26, 1942 – August 31, 1944
- Country: Empire of Japan
- Allegiance: Empire of Japan
- Branch: (Empire of Japan) Imperial Japanese Army
- Type: Army aviation unit
- Role: Fighter, bomber, reconnaissance
- Part of: 8th Area Army
- Garrison/HQ: Rabaul, New Britain; Wewak, New Guinea
- Nickname(s): Abbreviation code: 6FD; HQ code: Yō 9301
- Engagements: World War II: New Guinea campaign

The 6th Air Division (第六飛行師団, Dai 6 Hikō Shidan) was a land-based aviation force of the Imperial Japanese Army. It was formed on 25 November 1942, as part of the Eighth Area Army. It was incorporated into the Fourth Air Army based at Rabaul in June 1943.

The division moved its headquarters to Wewak on 9 July 1943. After being reduced in men and aircraft due to Allied aerial attacks and bombing missions by 31 May 1944, the division was disbanded in August at Hollandia.

== Commanders ==
- Lieutenant General Giichi Itahana (26 Nov 1942 - 1 Apr 1944)
- Major General Masazumi Inada (1 Apr 1944 - 31 May 1944)

== Organisation ==
- 11th Hikō Sentai (1943)
- 68th Hikō Sentai (1943)
- 78th Hikō Sentai (1943)
- 13th Hikō Sentai (1943)
- 24th Hikō Sentai (1943)

== See also ==
- List of air divisions of the Imperial Japanese Army

== Notes and references ==
- Shindo, Hiroyuki. 2001, Japanese air operations over New Guinea during the Second World War, Journal of the Australian War Memorial.
- Rekishi Dokuhon, Document of the war No. 42 Overview of Imperial Japanese Army Units, Shin-Jinbutsuoraisha Co., Ltd., Tōkyō, Japan, 1998, ISBN 4-404-02639-0.
