= Kyoji Tominaga =

Officer in the Imperial Japanese Army

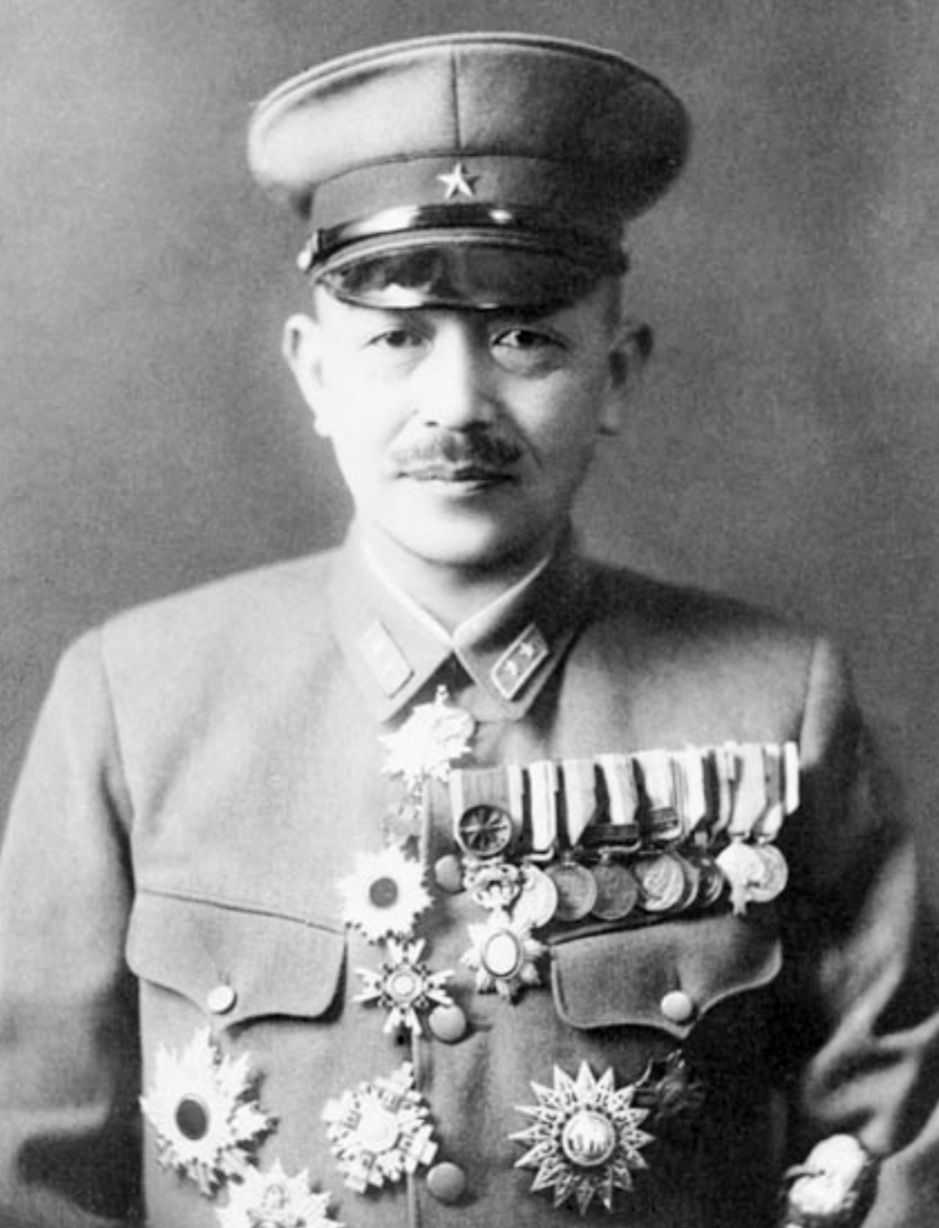
- Tominaga in 1941
- Native name: 富永 恭次
- Born: 2 January 1892; Nagasaki Prefecture, Japan
- Died: 14 January 1960 (aged 68) Setagaya, Tokyo
- Allegiance: Empire of Japan
- Branch: Imperial Japanese Army: Army Air Service
- Service years: 1913–1945
- Rank: Lieutenant General
- Commands: Fourth Air Army; 139th Division
- Conflicts: World War I; World War II; Second Sino-Japanese War; Philippines campaign; Soviet–Japanese War

Kyoji Tominaga (富永 恭次; 2 January 1892 – 14 January 1960) was an officer in the Imperial Japanese Army. During World War II, he served on the cabinet of Prime Minister Hideki Tojo.

== Early life and career ==
Tominaga was born in Nagasaki Prefecture. He was the second son of Kichitaro Tominaga, a doctor. In 1913 he graduated from the Imperial Japanese Army Academy and joined the 23rd Infantry Regiment. He was eventually assigned to the Imperial Japanese Army General Staff Office in 1927, and served as an attaché at the Japanese embassy in Moscow.

== World War II ==
Tominaga was promoted to colonel in 1936 and shortly thereafter transferred to the Kwantung Army, where he became subordinate to Lieutenant General Hideki Tojo, who was then the Kwantung Army's Chief of Staff. Tominaga was then promoted to major general in 1939 and reassigned to the Japanese Army General Staff, eventually replacing Lieutenant General Masazumi Inada as its Chief of Operations. In September 1940, Tominaga was attached to the Japanese South China Area Army, taking part in the invasion of French Indochina.

=== Vice Minister of War ===
After Hideki Tojo's appointment to Prime Minister in 1941, Tominaga, having recently attained the rank of lieutenant general, was appointed to Tojo's cabinet, initially being given command of the War Ministry's Personnel Bureau. In March 1943, Tominaga was promoted to the position of Vice Minister of War. As many of Tojo's detractors in the Japanese military criticized his appointing of cabinet members based on personal loyalty as opposed to actual merit, Lieutenant General Tominaga earned the derogatory nickname of "Tojo's Belt". After Tojo was ousted as Prime Minister in July 1944, Tominaga was relieved of his post in government.

=== Later commands ===
Following the dissolution of Tojo's Government, Japanese War Minister Hajime Sugiyama placed Tominaga in control of the 4th Air Army, which was stationed in the Philippines. He commanded the force during the Allied liberation of the Philippines, before his unit was transferred to the Tenth Area Army stationed in Taiwan in January 1945. Tominaga was retired from service shortly thereafter, though was briefly recalled to active duty in July 1945 to command the 139th Division stationed in Manchukuo.

== Captivity and later life ==
Following the Soviet invasion of Manchuria in August 1945, Tominaga and the 139th Division attempted to evade the Soviets and flee Manchuria. However, he was eventually captured in Changbai by forces of the Soviet Red Army, and was eventually sent to a Siberian gulag, where he was imprisoned for ten years. He was eventually freed and returned to Japan in 1955, settling in Tokyo. He died on 14 January 1960 following a heart attack.
