= 7th Air Division (Japan) =

- Active: January 28, 1943 – July 21, 1945
- Country: Empire of Japan
- Allegiance: Empire of Japan
- Branch: (Empire of Japan) Imperial Japanese Army
- Type: Army aviation unit
- Role: Fighter, bomber, reconnaissance
- Part of: 3rd Air Army; 8th Area Army; 4th Air Army
- Garrison/HQ: Singapore; Wewak, New Guinea; Ambon, Ambon Island
- Nickname(s): Abbreviation code: 7FD; HQ code: Shū 9311
- Engagements: World War II: New Guinea campaign; Philippines campaign; Borneo campaign

The 7th Air Division (第七飛行師団, Dai 7 Hikō Shidan) was a land-based aviation force of the Imperial Japanese Army. The division was formed on 29 January 1943 in the Netherlands East Indies as part of the Eighth Area Army. It was incorporated into the Fourth Air Army based at Rabaul on 28 July 1943.

The division moved its headquarters to Wewak in June 1943. The division was disbanded 24 July 1945.

== Commanders ==
- Lt. General Einosuke Sudō (29 January 1943 – 1 February 1945)
- Lt. General Chōji Shirokane (1 February 1945 – 16 July 1945)

== Organisation ==
- 59th Hikō Sentai (1943)
- 5th Hikō Sentai (1943)
- 7th Hikō Sentai (1943)
- 61st Hikō Sentai (1943)

== See also ==
- List of air divisions of the Imperial Japanese Army

== Notes and references ==
- Shindo, Hiroyuki. 2001, Japanese air operations over New Guinea during the Second World War, Journal of the Australian War Memorial.
- Rekishi Dokuhon, Document of the war No. 42 Overview of Imperial Japanese Army Units, Shin-Jinbutsuoraisha Co., Ltd., Tōkyō, Japan, 1998, ISBN 4-404-02639-0.
