= 2nd Raiding Brigade =

WWII Imperial Japanese Army Military unit

- Active: 1941—2 September 1945
- Country: Japan
- Allegiance: Emperor of Japan
- Branch: Imperial Japanese Army
- Type: Airborne forces
- Size: 2,475 personnel
- Nickname: Takachiho Paratroopers
- Engagements: World War II: Invasion of Sumatra; Battle of Leyte; Battle of Luzon

Commanders
- Notable commanders: Kenji Tokunaga

Aircraft flown
- Transport: Mitsubishi Ki-57s (Type 100)

The 2nd Raiding Brigade, also known as the Takachiho Paratroopers, was an Imperial Japanese airborne forces unit. Part of the Imperial Japanese Army Air Service (IJAAS), the unit was notably involved in the Battle of the Philippines in 1945, during which it was almost completely destroyed.

== History ==
=== Background ===
In the years preceding the Second World War, the Imperial Japanese Army invested in the deployment of paratroop divisions. Intended to serve as elite troops, the Japanese paratrooper force was trained to conduct paradrops behind enemy lines and onto small islands. Initially limited in number, the Imperial Japanese army chose to scale up its paratroop forces after witnessing the successful use of German Fallschirmjäger in 1940 and 1941. The Imperial army's paratroopers were distinct from the Imperial navy's paratroopers, which were deployed as part of the Special Naval Landing Forces.

=== Founding ===
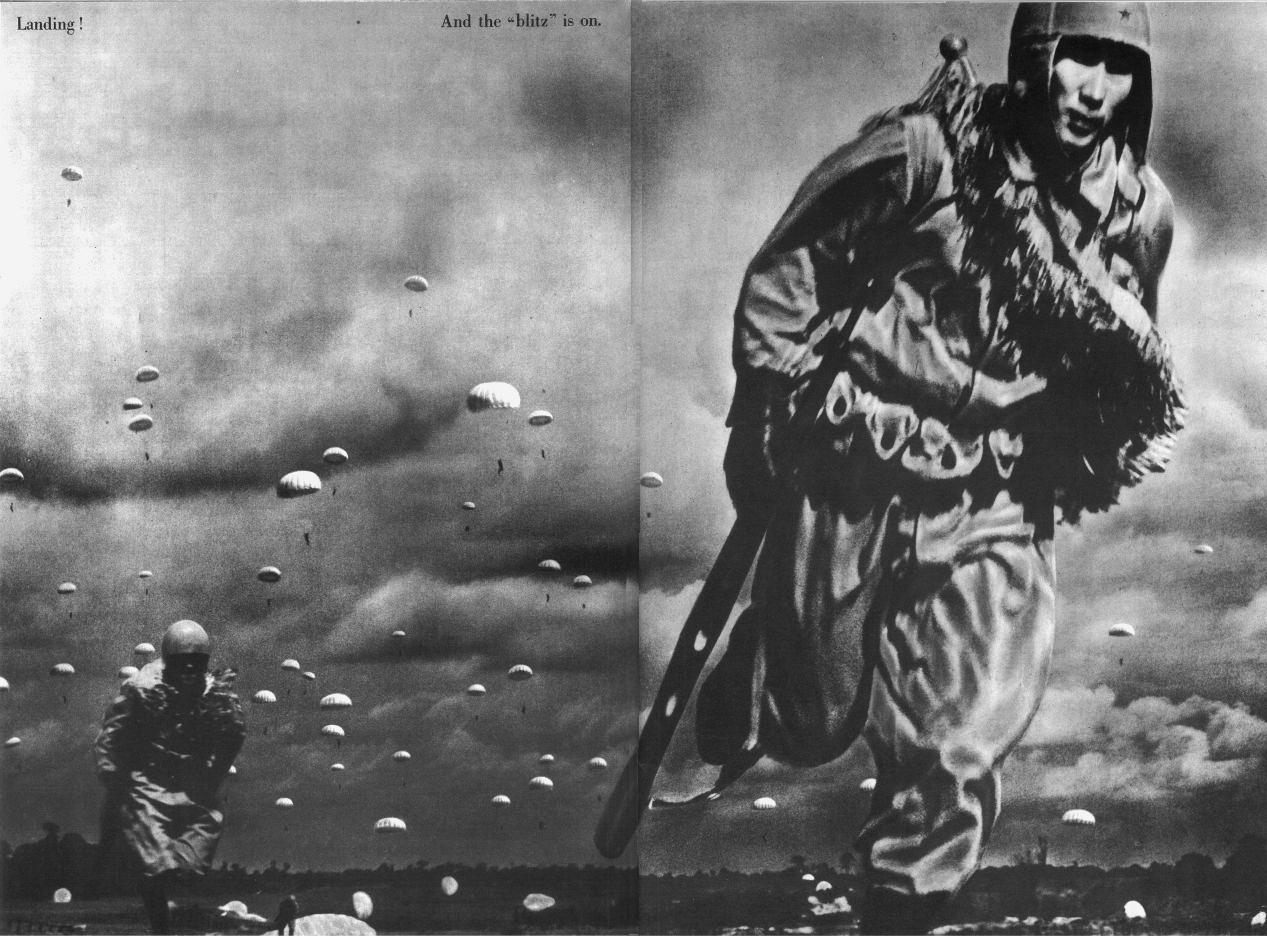
IJA Paratroopers Teishin Shudan in Palembang February 13-15, 1942

Organized as part of the Teishin Shudan (jp:Raiding Group), the 2nd Raiding Brigade was formed in 1941. The brigade was trained in Takachiho, Miyazaki on the island of Kyushu, and later took its name from the town. The unit was divided into two regiments, the 1st and 2nd regiment, each numbering around 700 men. Counting ground support, logistics companies, and pilots, the brigade had around 2475 men. During combat operations later in the war, the brigade was divided into four regiments.

In February 1942 the brigade was dropped over and captured a Dutch oil refinery in Pelembang, using captured Lockheed Hudsons with Royal Air Force markings for deception. A small drop was conducted over Timor later that year, but 2nd Brigade saw no further action until late 1944.

=== Battle of the Philippines ===
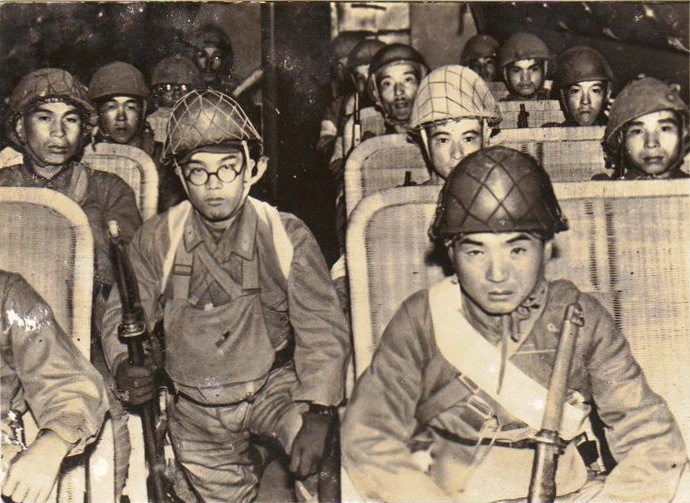
2nd Raiding Brigade troops in a Fourth Air Army L2D

During the Philippines campaign, the 2nd Raiding Brigade was deployed to Luzon in the Japanese-occupied Philippines to reinforce the islands' garrison (American forces had landed on nearby Leyte in late October) while the rest of the Raiding Group remained in Japan. Under the command of Colonel Kenji Tokunaga, the brigade was ordered to Luzon on 25 October, with the unit arriving on the island on 30 November with no losses. On Luzon, the brigade was ordered to conduct operations against small airstrips on Leyte under American control; these airstrips were being used to project American air superiority over Leyte and as a staging ground for American attacks on convoys carrying Japanese reinforcements. Japanese commanders hoped that, by launching paratrooper attacks on the airstrips, sufficient numbers of American planes could be destroyed on the ground to halt the American advance and to allow for reinforcements to be safely sent to Leyte.

The Japanese planned the paratrooper attacks for the night of 6 December, with follow-up attacks planned for the following nights. The drops would be made from Fourth Air Army's Mitsubishi Ki-57s launched from Clark Air Base; some of the aircraft would conduct traditional drops, while others would be loaded with troops and perform intentional crash-landings on targeted airstrips. Four airstrips were targeted, with between 342 and 409 men from the 3rd and 4th regiments being allocated for the assault. To aid communication in the dark, officers were equipped with harmonicas. The jumps were termed Operation Te and would be carried out and in conjunction with a ground assault (Operation We).

In the attack that followed, the brigade suffered heavy casualties. Most transports made it to their designated drop zones, but 18 out of 35 aircraft were subsequently shot down or crashed, and the heavy anti-aircraft fire encountered led to confused pilots dropping their troopers over the wrong targets. The attacking paratroopers did some damage, but many were cut down by American anti-aircraft fire. In addition, two of the airstrips targeted were not in use at the time of the attack and as such lacked the aircraft that were the mission target. A second attack the following night was aborted due to bad weather, and the expected ground attack fizzled the day before the jump. The paratroopers held one airstrip (which had accidentally been targeted by several transports) overnight, but were gradually forced back by American units in the area. Some paratroopers joined Japanese holdouts in the area and by 12 December had been destroyed, while others successfully returned to Japanese lines.

While Operation Te was underway, a second series of attacks were launched against American targets around Ormoc. The attacks - taking place from 8 to 14 December - dropped around 500 paratroopers around Ormoc, where they met with some success against American units in the area. By January around 400 troopers remained on Leyte, but by mid-March less than 200 remained; 75 fit men were evacuated to Cebu on 17 March, and none of the 100 men left on Leyte survived the war.

After the defeat on Leyte, the brigade was scattered across numerous islands. Around 500 men remained on Luzon, fighting with the island's garrison until the end of the war, with 80 men surviving. Around 60 paratroopers deployed to the island of Negros where they fought against the American invasion of the island, notably against American paratroopers of the 503rd Infantry Regiment. Around half of the men on Negros survived the war. A small force of the troopers evacuated from Luzon linked up with the headquarters staff of the Twenty-Fifth Army, eventually setting up positions on Cebu. When American forces landed on the island, the remnants of the brigade retreated into the jungle, with 17 surviving the war.
