= Imperial Japanese Army Air Service =

Aerial warfare branch of the Imperial Japanese Army from 1912 to 1945

- 大日本帝國陸軍航空部隊; Dainippon Teikoku Rikugun Kōkūbutai
- Rising Sun Flag
- Active: 1912–1945
- Country: Empire of Japan
- Branch: Imperial Japanese Army
- Type: Air force
- Role: Aerial warfare
- Part of: Imperial Japanese Armed Forces
- Engagements: World War I Mukden Incident; Sino-Japanese War II; Battles of Khalkhin Gol; World War II: Battle of Singapore

Commanders
- Ceremonial chief: Emperor of Japan
- Notable commanders: Hajime Sugiyama; Prince Naruhiko Higashikuni; Shunroku Hata; Masakazu Kawabe

Insignia
- Roundel

The Imperial Japanese Army Air Service (IJAAS) or The Imperial Japanese Army Air Force (IJAAF) (Japanese: 大日本帝國陸軍航空部隊, romanized: Dainippon Teikoku Rikugun Kōkūbutai, lit. 'Greater Japan Empire Army Air Corps') was the aviation force of the Imperial Japanese Army (IJA). Its primary mission was to provide tactical close air support for ground forces, as well as a limited air interdiction capability. The IJAAS also provided aerial reconnaissance to other branches of the IJA. While the IJAAS engaged in strategic bombing of cities such as Shanghai, Nanjing, Canton, Chongqing, Rangoon, and Mandalay, this was not the primary mission of the IJAAS as it lacked a heavy bomber force.

The IJAAS did not usually control artillery spotter/observer aircraft; artillery battalions controlled the light aircraft and balloons that operated in these roles.

The Imperial Japanese Navy Air Service was responsible for long-range bomber and attack aircraft, as well as strategic air defense. It was not until the later stages of the Pacific War that the two air arms attempted to integrate the air defense of the home islands.

== History ==
=== Origins ===
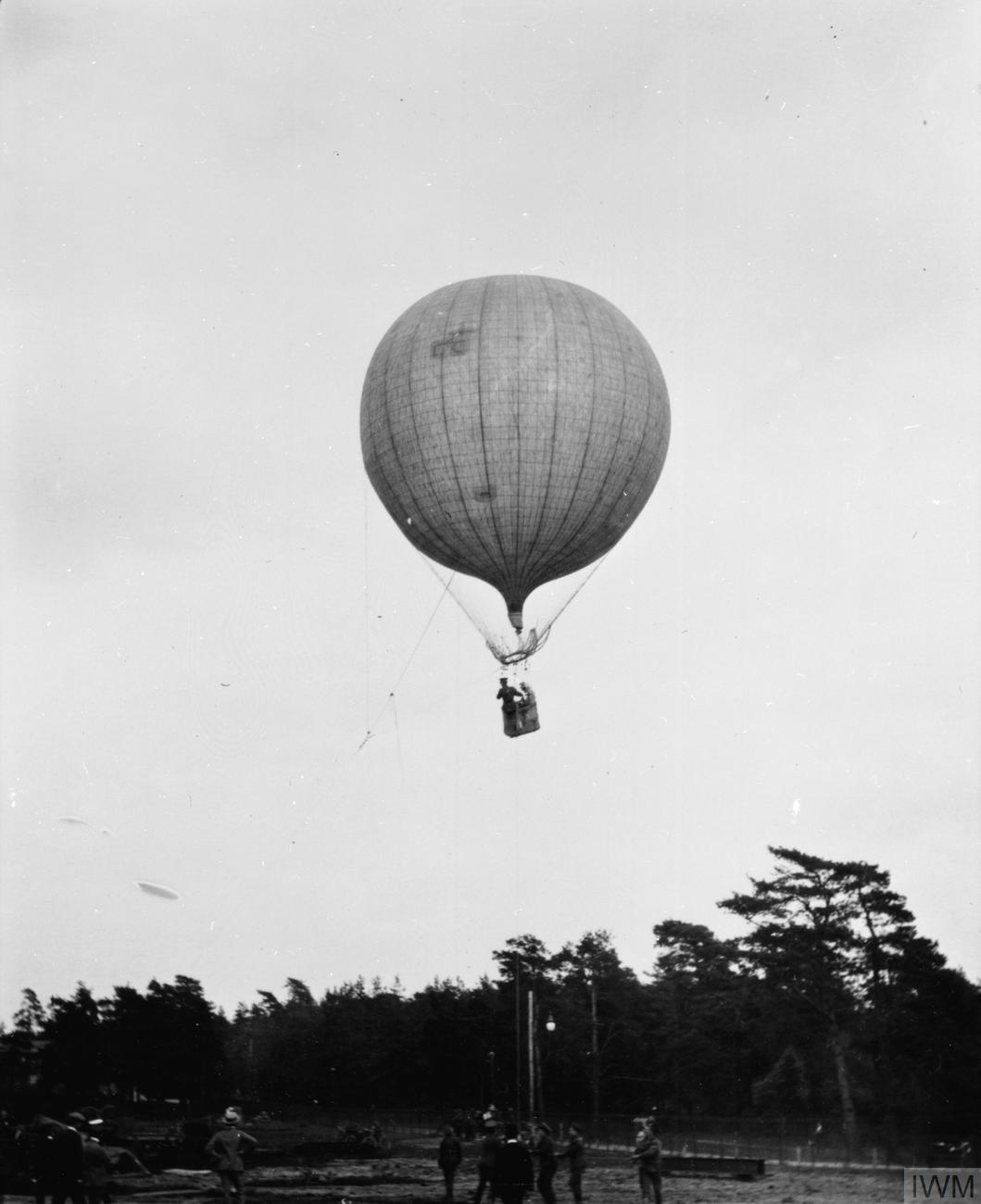
Typical of pre-WWI observation balloons

The Japanese military became interested in the use of captive balloons in the mid 19th century, having noted their use by Western European armies. The first experimental ascent by the Japanese was in 1874 at the cadet military school. Japan began to construct its own balloons in 1877 based on a French one they had acquired. Yamada Isaburô, an industrialist, started to develop a hydrogen balloon in 1897. In 1900 he invented a cylindrical kite balloon and sold them to the Imperial Japanese Army. The army first used them operationally during the Russo-Japanese War of 1904-1905 for artillery spotting.

In 1907, Lieutenant Commander Eisuke Yamamoto approached the Ministers of the Army and Navy, General Masatake Terauchi and Admiral Saitō Makoto. They formulated an aeronautical policy and established a dedicated military balloon unit. In 1909, together with the Imperial Japanese Navy and the Tokyo Imperial University, the Rinji Gunyo Kikyu Kenkyukai (Temporary Military Balloon Research Association) was set up. The association was chaired by Major General Masahiko Obama and continued to drive Japanese aviation policy until 1920. During March of that year Army Lieutenant Hino and Navy Engineer Sanji Narahara each designed an aircraft. Narahara flew the aircraft on 5 May 1910 making it the first Japanese built plane to do so. Subsequent designs were unsuccessful and the Army and Navy decided to utilise foreign aircraft until they could build a sufficient level of technical skill in Japan to design and build their own aircraft.

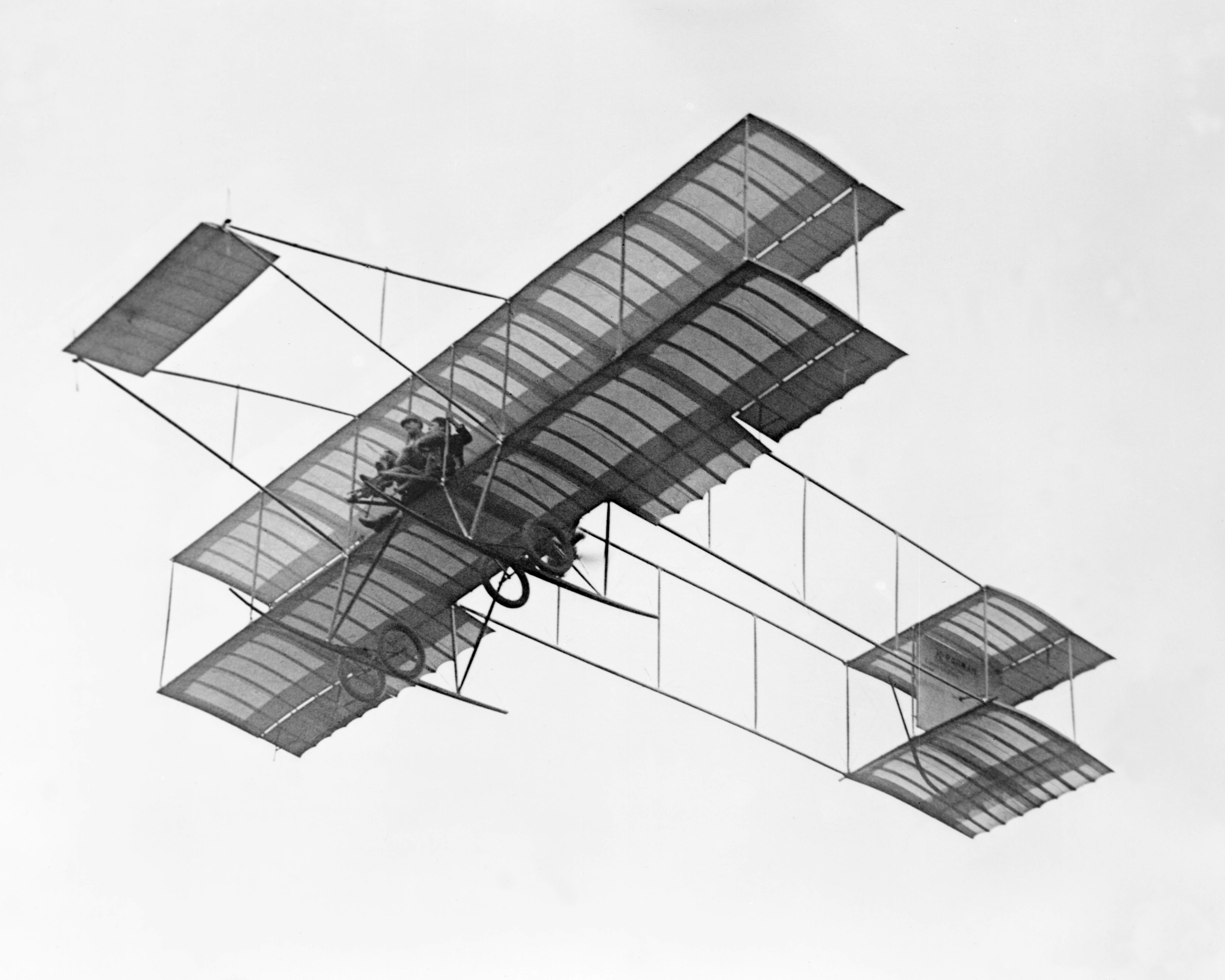
Farman III bi-plane

In 1910, the society sent Captain Yoshitoshi Tokugawa and Captain Hino Kumazō to France and Germany, respectively, to receive pilot training and purchase aircraft. The Japanese Army purchased its first aircraft, a Farman biplane and a Grade monoplane, which had been brought back by the officers from Western Europe. On December 19, 1909, Captain Yoshitoshi Tokugawa in a Farman III conducted the first successful powered flight on Japanese soil at Yoyogi Parade Ground in Tokyo. The following year in 1911, several more aircraft were imported and an improved version of the Farman III biplane, the Kaishiki No.1, was built and flown in Japan by Captain Togugawa. Also in 1911 a policy decision was made to split the Army and Navy aviation into two separate organisations.

First Japanese Army Air Service Aircraft
Year	Aircraft	Type	Number
1910	Farnham	III	1
	Grade	monoplane	1
1911	unspecified		unspecified
	Kaishiki	No 1	1

=== World War I ===
In 1914, with the outbreak of war, the Japanese laid siege to the German colony of Qingdao, aircraft from the army together with navy's seaplane carrier Wakamiya conducted reconnaissance and bombing operations. The Provisional Air Corps consisting of four Maurice Farman MF.7 biplanes and a single Nieuport VI-M monoplane flew 86 sorties between them. In December 1915, an air battalion based around 1 air company and 1 balloon company was created under the Army Transport Command and located at Tokorozawa. The Army Transport Command became responsible for all air operations. In total 10 aircraft were added the Army Air Service in 1914 and 1915.

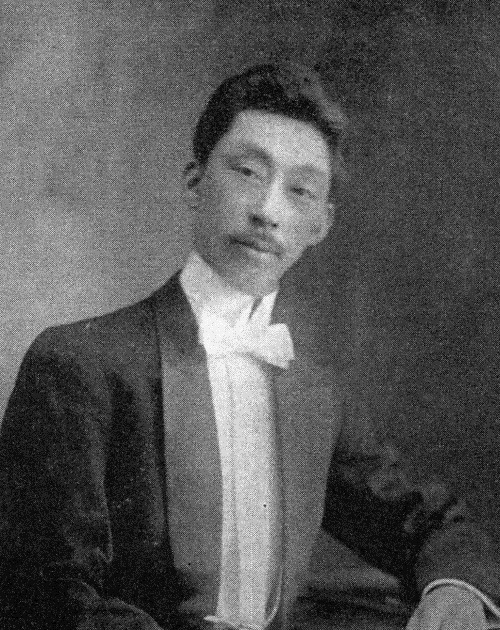
Kiyotake Shigeno (滋野清武)

A number of Japanese pilots served with French flying corp during the war. Kiyotake Shigeno joined the corps in December 1914. He was a member of the league of French flying aces having shot down two confirmed and six unconfirmed German aircraft. He also was awarded the Ordre national de la Légion d’honneur, France's highest decoration. Kobayashi Shukunosuke became a licensed pilot in December 1916, dying in combat during the 1918 Spring Offensive. He was posthumously awarded the Croix de Guerre. Isobe Onokichi, Ishibashi Katsunami, Masaru Kaiya (IJN), Tadao Yamanaka, Masatoshi Takeishi, Isakitchy Nagao, and Moro Goroku, a Kawasaki aircraft engineer, also served in the French Flying corp.

=== After World War I ===
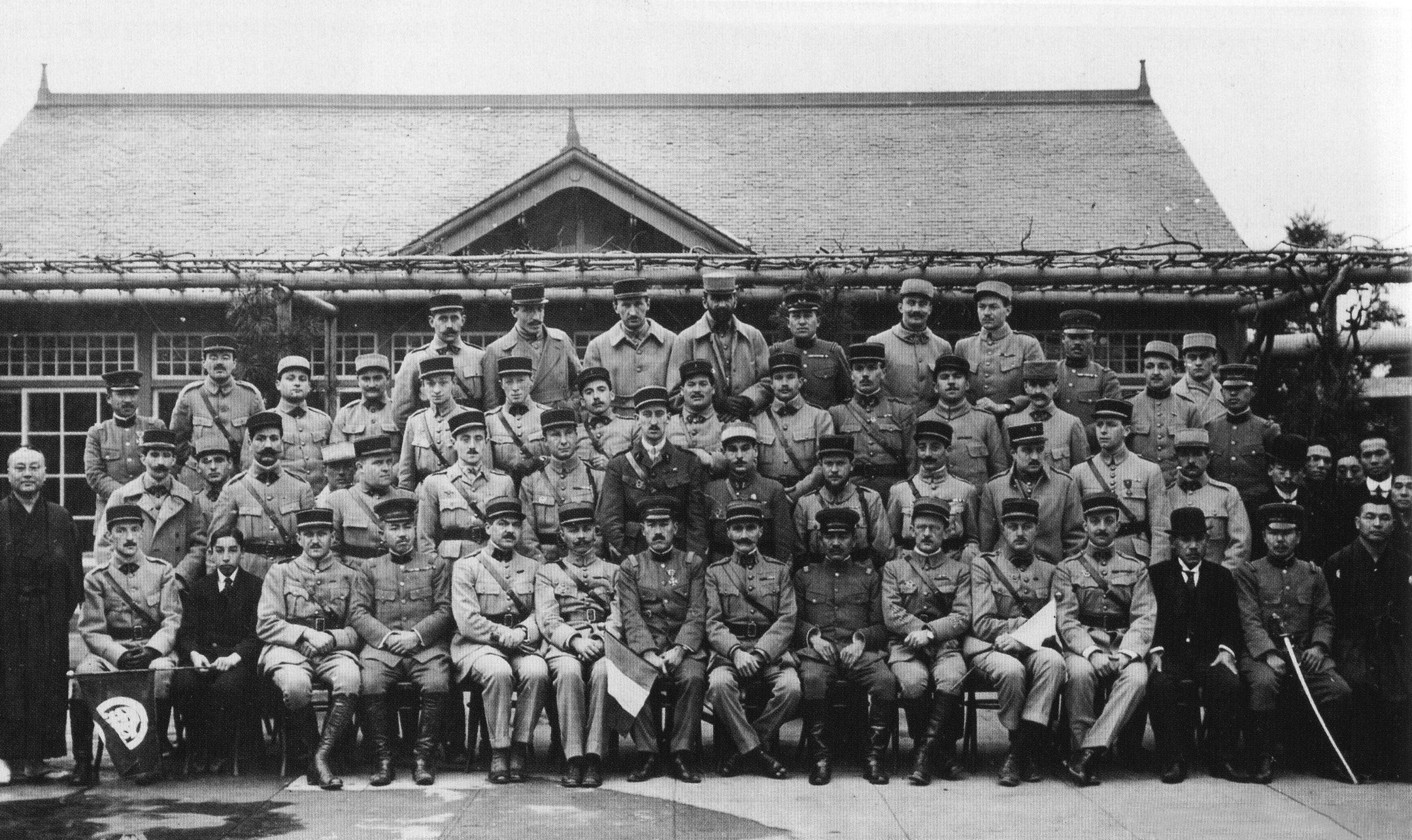
French Military Mission to Japan 1918-1919

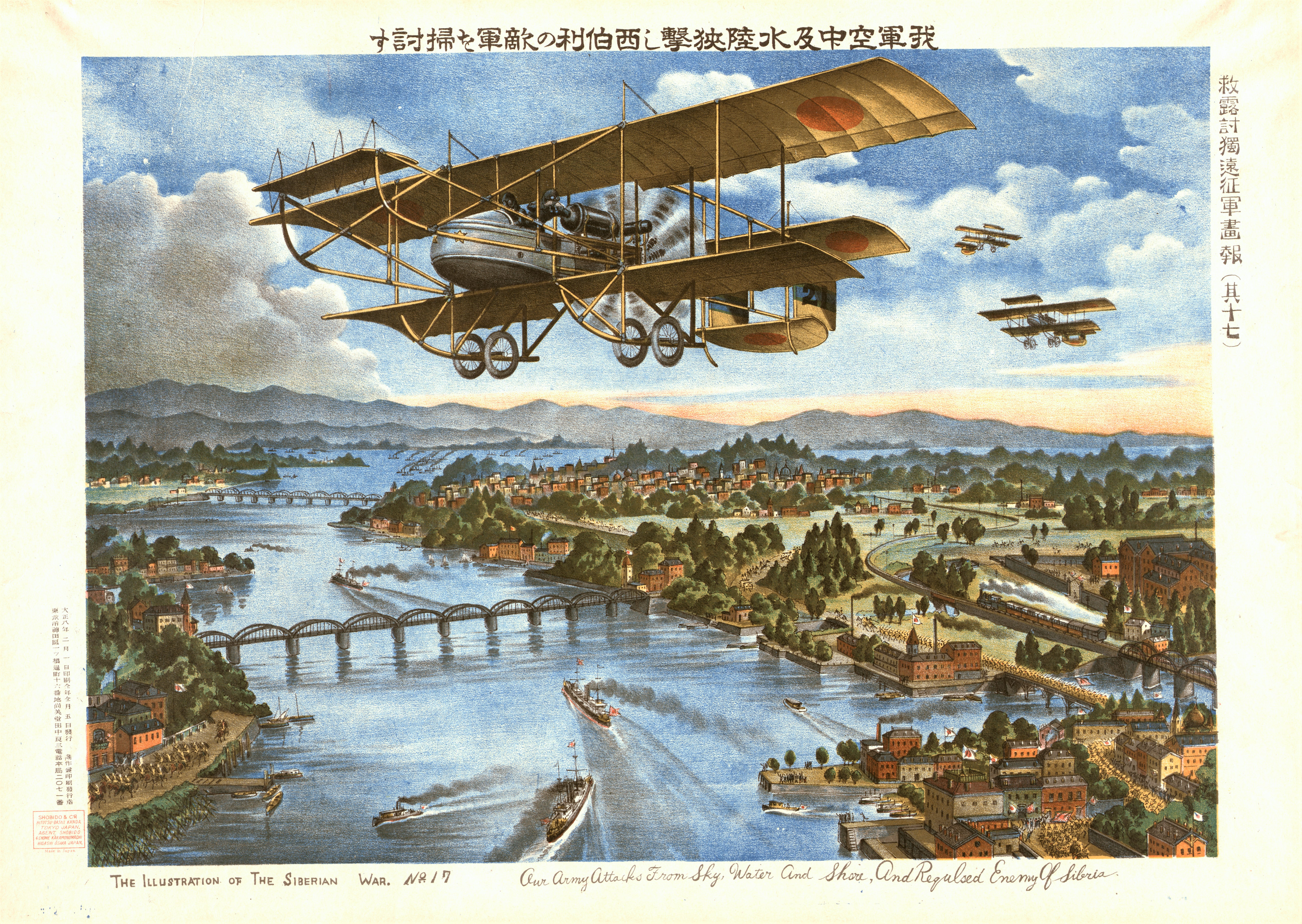
Siberian intervention

However, serious interest in military aviation did not develop until after World War I. Japanese military observers in Western Europe were quick to spot the advantages of the new technology, and after the end of the war, Japan purchased large numbers of surplus military aircraft, including 20 Sopwith 1½ Strutters, 3 Nieuport 24s, and 6 Spads. To cope with this increase in the number of available aircraft the first flying school was set up at Tozorozawa (Tokorozawa Rikugun Koku Seibi Gakkō) followed by Akeno and Shimoshizu. A French military mission was invited to Japan to help develop aviation. The mission was headed by Jacques-Paul Faure and composed of 63 members to establish the fundamentals of the Japanese aviation, the mission also brought several aircraft including 30 Salmson 2A2 as well as 2 Caquot dirigibles. In 1919 40 Nieuport, 100 Spad XIII, and two Breguet XIV. During this time Japanese aircraft were being used in combat roles during the 1920 Siberian Intervention against the Bolshevik Red Army near Vladivostok.

From 1918 reorganisation of the Army Air Service, the basic unit of the Service remained the Air Battalion (航空大隊, Kōkū Daitai), with each battalion consisting of two squadrons (中隊, Chutai) with nine aircraft each, plus three reserve aircraft and three earmarked for use by the headquarters, for a total of 24 aircraft per battalion. The officer commanding the chutai was the Chutaicho, whose rank was usually that of captain. The commander's aircraft often had distinctive markings, often a partly or totally scarlet, red, orange or yellow tail.

=== Aircraft production ===
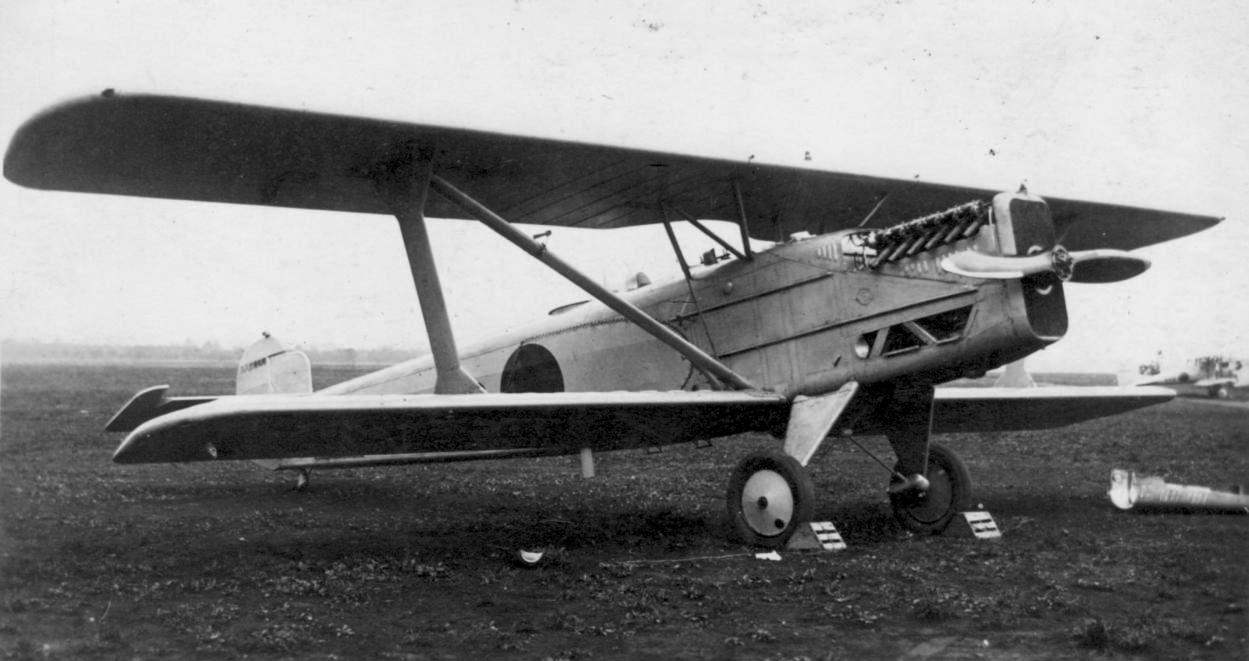
Kawasaki Type 88

The first aircraft factory in Japan, Nakajima Aircraft Company, was founded in 1916 and later obtained a license to produce the Nieuport 24 and Nieuport-Delage NiD 29 C.1 (as the Nakajima Ko-4) as well as the Hispano-Suiza engine. Nakajima later license-produced the Gloster Sparrowhawk and Bristol Jupiter. Similarly, Mitsubishi Heavy Industries started producing aircraft under license from Sopwith in 1921, and Kawasaki Heavy Industries started producing the Salmson 2 A.2 bomber from France, and hired German engineers such as Dr. Richard Vogt to produce original designs such as the Type 88 bomber. Kawasaki also produced aircraft engines under license from BMW. By the end of the 1920s, Japan was producing its own designs to meet the needs of the Army, and by 1935 had a large inventory of indigenous aircraft designs that were technically sophisticated.

=== Reorganisation ===
Japanese army aviation was organized into a separate chain of command within the Ministry of War of Japan in 1919. In May 1925, the Imperial Japanese Army Air Corps was established under the command of Lieutenant General Kinichi Yasumitsu, it was regarded as a branch equal to the artillery, cavalry or infantry, and contained 3,700 personnel with about 500 aircraft. In a reorganization of 1927-05-05, the Air Regiment (飛行連隊, Hikō Rentai) was created, each consisting of two battalions, with each battalion consisting of up to four squadrons. Each Air Regiment was a mixed purpose unit, consisting of a mixture of fighter and reconnaissance squadrons.

== Commanders ==
By World War Two the command structure of the Imperial Japanese Air Service fell under three separate areas. Operations were controlled by the Chief of General Staff through the area Army's direct to the Air Army's in each respective area. Training fell under the Inspectorate General of Aviation and personal, administration, and procurement fell under both the Minister of War and the Aviation Headquarters.

=== Air Army Commanders ===
See the respective Air Army:

- 1st Air Army
- 2nd Air Army
- 3rd Air Army
- 4th Air Army
- 5th Air Army
- 6th Air Army

=== Inspectorate General of Aviation ===
See the Inspectorate General of Aviation

=== Minister of War ===
See Ministry of the Army

== Second Sino-Japanese War and World War II ==
By 1941, the Japanese Army Air Force had about 1,500 combat aircraft. During the first years of the war, Japan continued technical development and deployment of increasingly advanced aircraft and enjoyed air superiority over most battlefields due to the combat experience of its crews and the handling qualities of its aircraft.

However, as the war continued, Japan found that its production could not match that of the Allies. On top of these production problems, Japan faced continuous combat and thus continued losses. Furthermore, there were continual production disruptions brought on by moving factories from location to location, each transfer with the goal of avoiding the Allied strategic bombing. Between these factors and others, such as the restricted strategic materials, the Japanese found themselves materialistically outmatched.

In terms of manpower, Japan was even worse off. Experienced crews were killed and replacements had not been planned. The Japanese had lost skilled trainers, and they did not have the fuel or the time to use the trainers they did have. Because of this, towards the end of its existence the JAAF resorted to kamikaze attacks against overwhelmingly superior Allied forces.

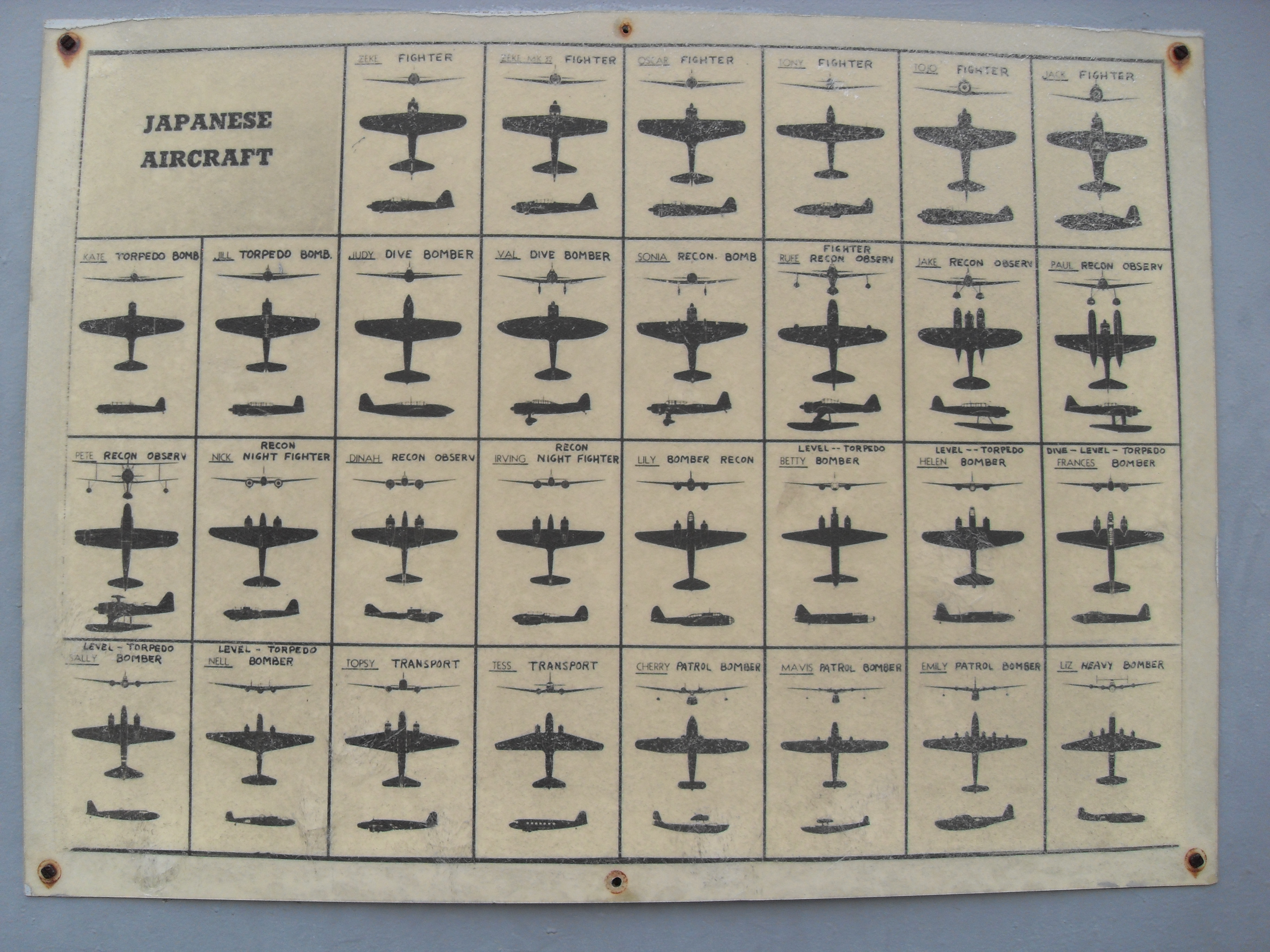
Identification chart for Japanese military planes during World War II

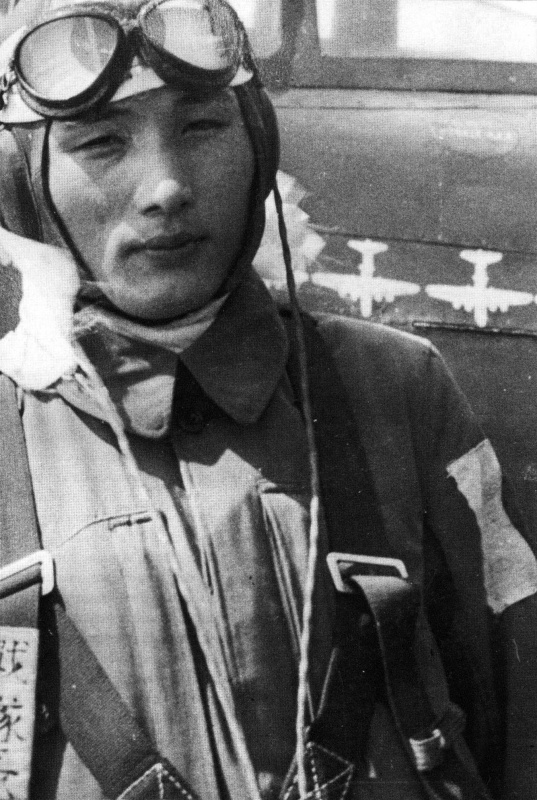
Major Teruhiko Kobayashi, the IJAAF's youngest sentai squadron commander

=== World War II aircraft ===
Important aircraft used by the Imperial Japanese Army Air Force during the Second Sino-Japanese War and World War II were:

==== Fighters ====
- Nakajima Ki-27 中島 キ27 九七式戦闘機 (Type 97 Fighter) 'Nate'
- Nakajima Ki-43 中島 キ43 一式戦闘機 隼 (Type 1 Fighter "Hayabusa") 'Oscar'
- Nakajima Ki-44 中島 キ44 二式戦闘機 鍾馗 (Type 2 Fighter "Shōki") 'Tojo'
- Kawasaki Ki-45 Kai 川崎 キ45改 二式複座戦闘機 屠龍 (Type 2 Two-seat Fighter "Toryū") 'Nick'
- Kawasaki Ki-61 川崎 キ61 三式戦闘機 飛燕 (Type 3 Fighter "Hien") 'Tony'
- Nakajima Ki-84 中島 キ84 四式戦闘機 疾風 (Type 4 Fighter "Hayate") 'Frank'
- Kawasaki Ki-100 川崎 キ100 五式戦闘機 (Type 5 Fighter)
- Mitsubishi Ki-109 三菱 キ109 試作特殊防空戦闘機 (Experimental heavy fighter interceptor)

==== Bombers ====
- Mitsubishi Ki-21 三菱 キ21 九七式重爆撃機 (Type 97 Heavy Bomber) 'Sally'
- Mitsubishi Ki-30 三菱 キ30 九七式軽爆撃機 (Type 97 Light Bomber) 'Ann'
- Kawasaki Ki-32 川崎 キ32 九八式軽爆撃機, (Type 98 Light Bomber) 'Mary'
- Kawasaki Ki-48 川崎 キ48 九九式双軽爆撃機 (Type 99 Twin-engined Light Bomber) 'Lily'
- Nakajima Ki-49 中島 キ49 一〇〇式重爆撃機 呑龍 (Type 100 Heavy Bomber "Donryū") 'Helen'
- Mitsubishi Ki-67 三菱 キ67 四式重爆撃機 飛龍 (Type 4 Heavy Bomber "Hiryū") 'Peggy'

==== Forward air control aircraft ====
- Mitsubishi Ki-51 三菱 キ51 九九式襲撃機 (Type 99 Assault plane) 'Sonia'
- Kawasaki Ki-102 川崎 キ102 五式双発襲撃機 (Type 5 Twin-engined Assault plane) 'Randy'

==== Transports ====
- Nakajima Ki-34 中島 キ34 九七式輸送機 (Type 97 Transporter) 'Thora'
- Mitsubishi Ki-57 三菱 キ57 一〇〇式輸送機 (Type 100 Transporter) 'Topsy'
- Kawasaki Ki-56 川崎 キ56 一式貨物輸送機 (Type 1 Cargo aircraft) 'Thalia'
- Kokusai Ki-59 国際 キ59 一式輸送機 (Type 1 Transporter) 'Theresa'

==== Reconnaissance planes ====
- Mitsubishi Ki-15 三菱 キ15 九七式司令部偵察機 (Type 97 Army HQ Reconnaissance plane) 'Babs'
- Tachikawa Ki-36 立川 キ36 九八式直協偵察機 (Type 98 Reconnaissance plane) 'Ida'
- Mitsubishi Ki-51 三菱 キ51 九九式軍偵察機 (Type 99 Reconnaissance plane) 'Sonia'
- Mitsubishi Ki-46 三菱 キ46 一〇〇式司令部偵察機 (Type 100 Army HQ Reconnaissance plane) Dinah

==== Trainers ====
- Tachikawa Ki-9 立川 キ9 九五式一型練習機 (Type 95 Model 1 Intermediate trainer) Spruce
- Tachikawa Ki-17 立川 キ17 九五式三型練習機 (Type 95 Model 3 Basic trainer) 'Cedar'
- Tachikawa Ki-55 立川 キ55 九九式高等練習機 (Type 99 Advanced trainer) 'Ida'
- Tachikawa Ki-54 立川 キ54 一式双発高等練習機 (Type 1 Twin-engine advanced trainer) 'Hickory'
- Manshū Ki-79 満州 キ79 二式高等練習機 (Type 2 Advanced trainer)
- Kokusai Ki-86 国際 キ86 四式基本練習機 (Type 4 Basic trainer) 'Cypress'

==== Other planes ====
- Kokusai Ki-76 国際 キ76 三式指揮連絡機 (Type 3 Command-control/Liaisonal plane) 'Stella'
- Kayaba Ka-1 萱場 カ号観測機 (Ka-Gō Artillery-spotter)

=== Organization ===
==== Army Aeronautical Department Sections ====
- Commander-in-Chief of Army Air Service Office
- Air Service Staff Department
- General Affairs and Administrative Department
- Inspectorate General of Aviation
  - General Affairs Unit of Inspectorate of Army Aviation
- Air Training and Instruction Department
- Imperial Japanese Army Air Service Academy
- Supply Bureau
- Tachikawa Army Air Arsenal
- Army Air Transport Department
- Army Air Intelligence Department

==== Operational Organization ====
With the start of the Second Sino-Japanese War in 1937, operational conditions favored the use of many small units, resulting in the creation of many Dokuritsu Hikō Daitai (独立飛行大隊, independent Air Battalions) or even Dokuritsu Hikō Chutai (独立飛行中隊, independent squadrons), each with its own distinctive markings.

In August 1938, a complete re-organization of the Army Air Service resulted in the creation of the Hikō Sentai (飛行戦隊, Air Combat Group), which replaced all of the former Air Battalions and Air Regiments. Each Air Combat Group was a single-purpose unit consisting typically of three squadrons, divided into three shōtai (小隊, flights) of three aircraft each. Together with reserve aircraft and the headquarters flight, an Air Combat Group typically had 45 aircraft (fighter) or up to 30 aircraft (bomber or reconnaissance). Two or more Air Combat Groups formed an Hikōdan (飛行団, Air Brigade), which, together with base and support units and a number of Independent Squadrons, formed an Hikō Shudan (飛行集団, Air Corps).

In 1942, the Air Corps were renamed Hikō Shidan (飛行師団, Air Divisions), to mirror the terminology for infantry divisions, but the structure remained the same. Two Air Divisions, together with some independent units made an Kōkū gun (航空軍, Air Army).

Throughout most of the Pacific War, the Japanese Army Air Service was organized into four Air Armies, with two more added in the final stages of the war:

- 1st Air Army – HQ Tokyo, basing in the Kanto Plain covering the Japanese home islands, Taiwan, Korea, Chishima, and Karafuto.
- 2nd Air Army - HQ Xinjing, covering Manchukuo
- 3rd Air Army - HQ Singapore, covering Southeast Asia
- 4th Air Army - HQ Rabaul, covering the Solomon Islands and New Guinea. Eventually based in the Philippines. Dissolved January 1945.
- 5th Air Army - HQ Nanjing, covering Japanese-occupied portions of southern and eastern China from February 1944.
- 6th Air Army – on Kyūshū covering Taiwan and Okinawa

In April 1944, a reorganization of the Japanese Army Air Service occurred. Maintenance and ground service units, formerly a separate command, were merged into the Air Combat Group (Hiko Sentai). The flying squadrons of the Air Combat Group were re-designated as Hikōtai (飛行隊, Squadron), and the ground units were designated Seibutai (整備隊, Maintenance Units).

Other changes in the final stages of the war were the formation of "Special Attack Units" and "Air-shaking Units", which were short-lived units with their own names (often taken from Japanese mythology or history) and markings, but located within existing squadrons. These units were specially designated and trained with the mission of air-to-air ramming of Allied bomber aircraft. They usually had their armaments removed and their airframes reinforced.

In the final phase of the war, the Special Attack Units evolved into dedicated suicide units for kamikaze missions. Around 170 of these units were formed, 57 by the Instructor Air Division alone. Notionally equipped with 12 aircraft each, it eventually comprised around 2,000 aircraft.

The final reorganisation of the took place during preparation for Operation Ketsu-Go, the defence of the home islands in 1945 against expected invasion when all the Air Armies were combined under a centralised command of General Masakazu Kawabe.

==== Special Operations Forces ====
Teishin Shudan ("Raiding Group") was the IJA's special forces/airborne unit during World War II. The word teishin may be literally translated as "dash forward", and is usually translated as "raiding". It may also be regarded as similar to the "commando" designation in the terminology of other armies. Called a division, the unit was a brigade-sized force, and was part of the Imperial Japanese Army Air Service (IJAAS). The Teishin units were therefore distinct from the marine parachute units of the Special Naval Landing Forces.

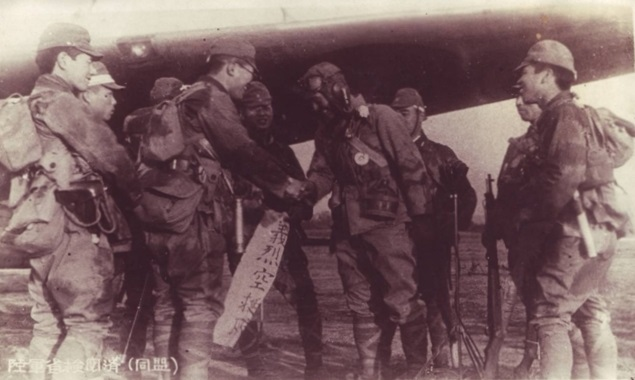
Captain Okuyama and Giretsu Airborne unit depart on their mission to Okinawa

'Giretsu' (義烈空挺隊, Giretsu Kūteitai) was an airborne special forces unit of the Imperial Japanese Army formed from Army paratroopers, in late 1944 as a last-ditch attempt to reduce and delay Allied bombing raids on the Japanese home islands. The Giretsu Special Forces unit was commanded by Lieutenant General Kyoji Tominaga.

=== Strength ===
In 1940 the Japanese Army Air Service consisted of the following:

- 33,000 personnel
- Over 1,600 aircraft (including 1,375 first line combat aircraft).
- The aircraft were organized into 85 Squadrons;
  - 36 fighter
  - 28 light bomber
  - 22 medium bomber
- Total military in August 1945 was 6,095,000 including 676,863 Army Air Service.

=== First Tachikawa Army Air Arsenal ===
The Japanese Air Army Force had one technical section, the First Tachikawa Air Army Arsenal, which was in charge of aviation research and development. The Arsenal included a testing section for captured Allied aircraft, the Air Technical Research Laboratory (Koku Gijutsu Kenkyujo).

The Army Air Arsenal was also connected with Tachikawa Hikoki K.K. and Rikugun Kokukosho K.K., the Army-owned and operated aircraft manufacturing companies. much as the IJNAS operated its own firm, the Yokosuka Naval Air Technical Arsenal.

=== Army escort aircraft carriers ===
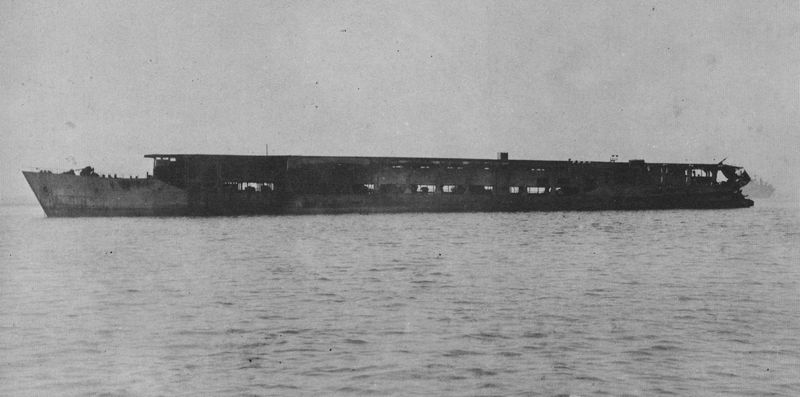
Escort carrier Yamashio Maru

Due to the poor relations between the Imperial Japanese Army and Imperial Japanese Navy, the Army found it necessary to procure and operate their own aircraft carriers for the purposes of providing escort and protection for Army transport shipping convoys. These "auxiliary escort carriers" were converted from merchant ships and possessed the capacity to operate few aircraft as well serve in some other auxiliary roles, depending on type and size.

Three classes were planned, all conversion of "TL Type cargo ships" (TL型), the Special 2TL Type (3 ships), Special 3TL Type (3 ships), and Special 4TL Type (0 ship), the Special 1TL Type being operated by the Navy. Only the Yamashio Maru from the Special 2TL Type was completed before the war's end. Those carriers only had a modest airwing (8 for Yamashio Maru), as they kept some of their cargo and tanker capacity.

The army also developed "landing craft carriers" for amphibious assaults, with among them the Types "C" and "MC", which were fitted with flight decks for some limited aerial support. Four ships were planned, with only the Akitsu Maru and Kumano Maru being completed before the war's end.

The only aircraft operated by those ships were the Kokusai Ki-76 (STOL liaison aircraft), and Kayaba Ka-1 (autogyros).

=== Uniforms and equipment ===
As an integral part of the IJA, the Army Air Service wore the standard Imperial Japanese Army Uniforms. Only flying personnel and ground crews wore sky blue trim and stripes, while officers wore their ranks on sky blue patches.

== See also ==
- List of military aircraft of Japan
- Giretsu special forces
- Teishin Shudan (Army air service airborne/commando division)
- Hikōtai Transport Unit
- Kōkūtai
- Inspectorate General of Aviation
- List of Radars in use by Imperial Japanese Army
- List of Bombs in use by Imperial Japanese Army
- List of weapons on Japanese combat aircraft
- List of Aircraft engines in use of Japanese Army Air Force
- List of Japanese trainer aircraft during World War II
- Japanese military aircraft designation systems
- Imperial Japanese Army Air Academy
- Air raids on Japan

== Bibliography ==
- Baëza, Bernard (November–December 2019). "Arawasi, "les aigles sauvages" de l'armée impériale japonaise, douzieme partie: la défense du territoire national" [Arawasi, the Wild Eagles of the Imperial Japanese Army, Part 12: The Defense of Japan]. Avions (in French). No. 232. pp. 36–51. ISSN 1243-8650.
- Francillon, René J. (1979). Japanese Aircraft of the Pacific War (2nd ed.). London: Putnam & Company. ISBN 0-370-30251-6.
- Hata, Ikuhiko; Izawa, Yashuho; Shores, Christopher (2002). Japanese Army Air Force Units and Their Aces: 1931-1945. London: Grub Street. ISBN 1-902304-89-6.
- Hata, Ikuhiko; Izawa, Yashuho; Shores, Christopher (2012). Japanese Army Fighter Aces: 1931-45. Vol. Stackpole Military History Series. London: Stackpole Books. ISBN 978-1-461-75118-2.
- Mayer, S.L. (1976). The Rise and Fall of Imperial Japan. The Military Press. ISBN 0-517-42313-8.
- Sakaida, Henry (1997). Japanese Army Air Force Aces, 1937-1945. Botley, UK: Osprey Publishing. ISBN 1-85532-529-2.
- Skates, John Ray. The Invasion of Japan: Alternative to the Bomb. Columbia, South Carolina: University of South Carolina Press, 1994. ISBN 0-87249-972-3.
- Stephenson, Charles (2017). The Siege of Tsingtau: The German-Japanese War 1914. Pen and Sword. ISBN 978-1-52670-295-1.
