= Eighth Area Army =

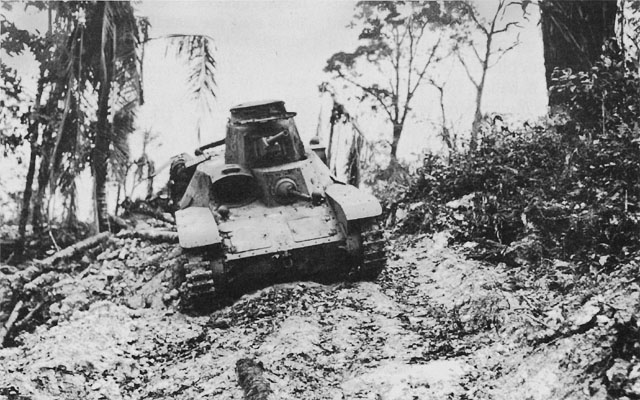
- Disabled Japanese tank at Biak
- Active: November 16, 1942 – August 15, 1945
- Country: Empire of Japan
- Branch: Imperial Japanese Army
- Type: Infantry
- Role: Field Army
- Garrison/HQ: Rabaul
- Nickname: 剛(Gō = “strength”)
- Engagements: Solomon Islands campaign New Guinea campaign Proposed invasion of Australia

The Eighth Area Army (第8方面軍, Dai-hachi hōmen gun) was a field army of the Imperial Japanese Army during World War II. The army was formed on 9 November 1942, becoming effective on 26 November at Rabaul as part of the Southern Army. The army was disbanded in September 1945.

== History ==
The Japanese 8th Area Army was formed on November 16, 1942 under the Southern Expeditionary Army Group for the specific task of opposing landings by Allied forces in Japanese-occupied Solomon Islands and New Guinea. It had its headquarters at Rabaul, New Britain and saw considerable combat in the Solomon Islands campaign, Bougainville campaign and New Guinea campaign.

== Organisation ==
- Seventeenth Army
- Eighteenth Army
- 6th Division
- 1st Independent Mixed Brigade
- 12th Air Brigade
- Part of the 5th Division (20 November 1942)
- 6th Air Division (25 November 1942)
- 7th Air Division (29 January 1943)

== List of commanders ==
| | Name | From | To |
|---|---|---|---|
| Commanding officer | General Hitoshi Imamura | 9 November 1942 | 15 August 1945 |
| Chief of Staff | Major General Rimpei Katō | 9 November 1942 | 15 August 1945 |
