= Wewak Airfield =

Coordinates: 3°33′S 143°38′E

Wewak Airfield is a former World War II airfield near Wewak, Papua New Guinea.

== History ==
Wewak Airfield was built by the Territory of New Guinea administration and the Catholic mission in 1937. The airfield consisted of a single runway, running parallel to Wirui Beach. The Imperial Japanese Army occupied the airfield on 18 December 1942 and began to redevelop the airfield. The airfield was abandoned after the war, with the runway now serving as part of a road.
