= 11th Air Squadron (Japan) =

The 11th Air Squadron (第十一飛行戦隊 – 11th Hiko Sentai) was a flying unit of the Imperial Japanese Army Air Service. It was established on 31 August 1938 at Harbin, Manchuria. The unit serviced in Manchuria during the Manchuria Incident, in China during the Second Sino-Japanese War, and later operated in Burma, the Netherlands, East Indies, Indochina, Rabaul, the Solomon Islands, New Guinea, the Philippines, Formosa, and Japan during World War II. The unit was disbanded at Takahagi, Japan, in late 1945.

== Aircraft ==
- Type 91 (December 1937 – June 1942)
- Type 92 (December 1937 – June 1942)
- Ki-27 (December 1937 – June 1942)
- Ki-43 I (August 1942 – June 1943)
- Ki-43 II (July 1943 – February 1944)
- Ki-84 (March 1944 – August 1945)

== Bases ==
- Harbin Manchuria Jun 1932 Jun 1939
- Saienjo Nomonhan May 1939 Sep 1939
- Harbin Sep 1939 Oct 1939
- Wuchang China Oct 1939 Dec 1940
- Harbin Dec 1940 Nov 1941
- Kukan Phu Quoc Indo China Dec 1941
- Singora Thailand Dec 1941 Jan 1942
- Kuantan Malaya Jan 1942 Feb 1942
- Tandjungkarang southern Sumatra Feb 1942 Mar 1942
- Palembang Mar 1942 Jun 1942 (detachment)
- Toungoo North Burma Apr 1942
- Myingyan Burma Apr 1942 May 1942
- Rangoon May 1942 Jun 1942
- Akeno Jul 1942 Sep 1942
- Mingaladon, Burma, October 1942 – November 1942
- Rabaul West, New Britain, December 1942 – June 1943
- Lae, New Guinea, January 1943 – March 1943
- Buka, Bougainville, January 1943 – February 1943
- Munda, Solomon Islands, January 1943 – February 1943 (detached)
- Wewak, New Guinea, March 1943 – May 1943
- Madang, New Guinea, March 1943 – May 1943
- Taisho, Japan, July 1943 – August 1943
- Harbin Aug 1943 Sep 1943
- Laolian Manchuria Sep 1943 Dec 1943
- Wuchang China Dec 1943
- Canton Dec 1943 Feb 1944
- Tokorozawa Mar 1944 Oct 1944
- Ilan Formosa Oct 1944
- Luzon Philippines Oct 1944 Nov 1944
- Shimodate north of Tokyo Nov 1944 Dec 1944
- Porac Luzon Dec 1944 Jan 1945
- Chaochou Formosa Jan 1945 Feb 1945
- Takaagi Kanto district Mar 1945 Aug 1945
