= Kitsuju Ayabe =

Imperial Japanese Army lieutenant general (1894–1980)

- 綾部 橘樹
- Born: 18 April 1894; Ōita, Japan
- Died: 14 February 1980 (aged 85)
- Education: Army Cavalry School; Army Staff College
- Military career
- Allegiance: Empire of Japan
- Branch: Imperial Japanese Army
- Service years: 1917–1945
- Rank: Lieutenant general
- Units: 12th Cavalry Regiment, Kwantung Army, Imperial Japanese Army General Staff, IJA 3rd Army, Japanese First Area Army, Southern Expeditionary Army Group, Japanese Seventh Area Army
- Commands: 25th Cavalry Regiment
- Conflicts: Siberian intervention; Second Sino-Japanese War; World War II; Pacific War
- Other work: Military attaché, chief, advisor

Kitsuju Ayabe (綾部 橘樹, Ayabe Kitsuju; 18 April 1894 – 14 February 1980) was a lieutenant general in the Imperial Japanese Army during World War II.

== Biography ==
=== Early career ===
Ayabe graduated from the 27th class of the Army Cavalry School in October 1917. Upon receiving his commission as second lieutenant, he was assigned to the 12th Cavalry Regiment. He served in the Siberian intervention from August 1918 to July 1919. Ayabe then attended the Army War College (Japan) in 1924, and was promoted to captain after graduation. He served in a number of staff positions, and was sent to Poland and the Soviet Union from August 1928 to November 1930 as a military attaché. After his return to Japan, he was promoted to major, and in 1934 to lieutenant colonel.

=== Wartime career ===
From 1935 to 1937, Ayabe served as chief of the Maneuvers Section of the Kwantung Army, and from 1937 to 1939, as chief of 1st Section (Organization & Mobilization) in the Imperial Japanese Army General Staff, still based in Manchukuo at the start of the Second Sino-Japanese War.

From 1939 to 1940, Ayabe was commander of the 25th Cavalry Regiment, based in China, and was subsequently promoted to deputy chief of staff of the IJA 3rd Army (Manchuria) in 1940. From 1940 to 1941, he was sent on a military liaison mission to Berlin and Rome to coordinate efforts between Japan and the other Axis members of the Tripartite Alliance.

Subsequently, from July 1941 to 1942, Ayabe was deputy chief of staff of the Kwantung Army, Manchuria, and became chief of staff of the Japanese First Area Army (Manchuria) from July 1942.

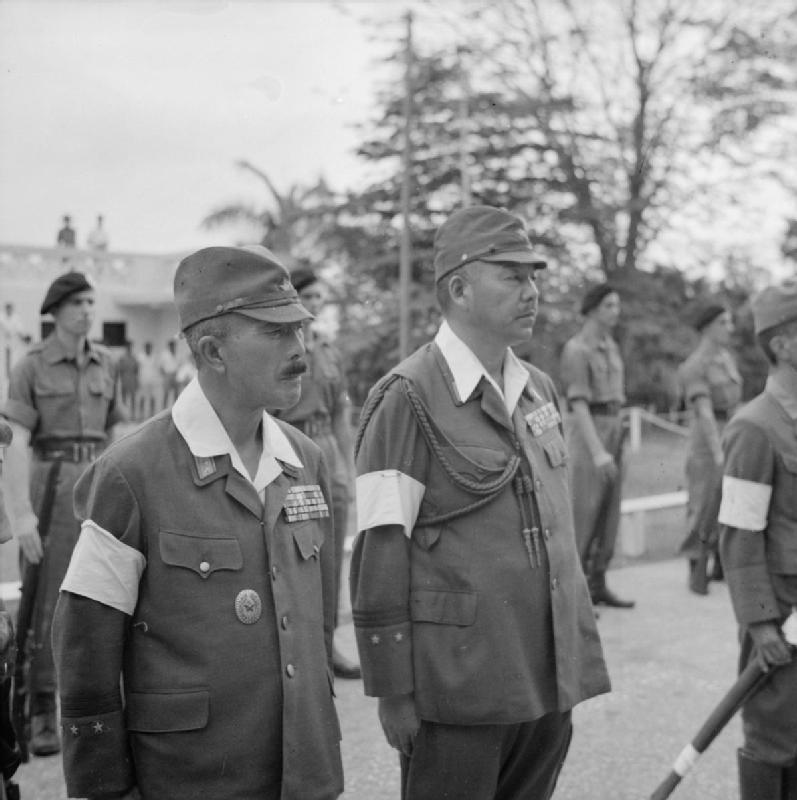
Generals Itagaki and Ayabe at a surrender ceremony in Kuala Lumpur, February 1946

After his promotion to lieutenant general in October 1943, Ayabe was reassigned to the Southern Expeditionary Army Group as deputy chief of staff and was based in Singapore. The Southern Army became the Japanese Seventh Area Army in 1944, and Ayabe was appointed as chief of staff. However, he was badly injured in an airplane crash in February 1944, and was assigned to staff duty in Tokyo through the remainder of the war.

Ayabe retired from active military service with the dissolution of the Imperial Japanese Army at the end of World War II. From 1955 to 1970, he worked as an advisor for Mitsubishi Heavy Industries.
