= Masazumi Inada =

Japanese officer, war criminal 1896-1986

- 稲田 正純
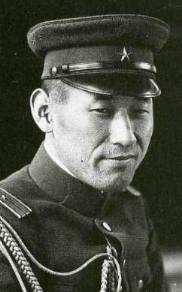
- Born: August 27, 1896; Tottori Prefecture, Empire of Japan
- Died: January 24, 1986 (aged 89); Japan
- Military career
- Allegiance: Empire of Japan
- Branch: Imperial Japanese Army
- Service years: 1917–1945
- Rank: Lieutenant General
- Conflicts: Second Sino-Japanese War; Soviet-Japanese Border Wars; World War II

Masazumi Inada (稲田 正純, Inada Masazumi; 27 August 1896 – 24 January 1986) was a lieutenant general in the Japanese Imperial Army during World War II.

== Early life and education ==
Inada was born in Tottori Prefecture in August 1896. He graduated from the 29th class of the Imperial Japanese Army Academy in 1917, where he specialized in artillery. He went on to graduate from the 37th class of the Army Staff College with honors in 1925.

== Career ==
After serving in a number of administrative positions with the Imperial Japanese Army General Staff, Inada was assigned as a military attaché to France from 1929-1931. After his promotion to colonel, Inada served as Chief of the 2nd Section (Maneuvers & War Plans), 1st Bureau, of the General Staff from 1938 to 1939, and was thus involved in the planning of the Battle of Wuhan and subsequent operations in the Second Sino-Japanese War. Inada was also involved in the planning for the ill-fated Battle of Lake Khasan and Battle of Khalkhin Gol in the Soviet-Japanese Border Wars.

From 1940 Inada was commanding officer of a heavy artillery regiment based in Acheng in northern Manchukuo. In 1941 he became Vice Chief of Staff of the 5th Army in Manchukuo. He was promoted to major general in 1941, and became Chief of Staff of the 5th Army from 1942.

Inada was then sent as Vice Chief of Staff of the Southern Expeditionary Army Group in the Pacific Theater from 1942 to 1943. To support Japanese forces in New Guinea he was sent in 1943 to command of the 2nd Field Operations Base Area. In 1944 he became commander of the 6th Air Division. Later that year, due to a diplomatic incident in Thailand, he was placed in reserve, then reassigned as commander of the 3rd Shipping Transport Command, based in Singapore. Promoted to lieutenant general in April 1945, Inada was Chief of Staff of the 16th Area Army until the surrender of Japan.

== Later life and death ==
After the end of the war, Inada was arrested by the American occupation authorities and tried before a military tribunal held in Yokohama for war crimes. He was found guilty of his complicity in the cover-up of the vivisection and other human medical experiments performed at the Kyushu Imperial University on downed Allied airmen. He was sentenced to 7 years in prison, and was released from prison in 1951. He died in 1986.
