= Third Air Army (Japan) =

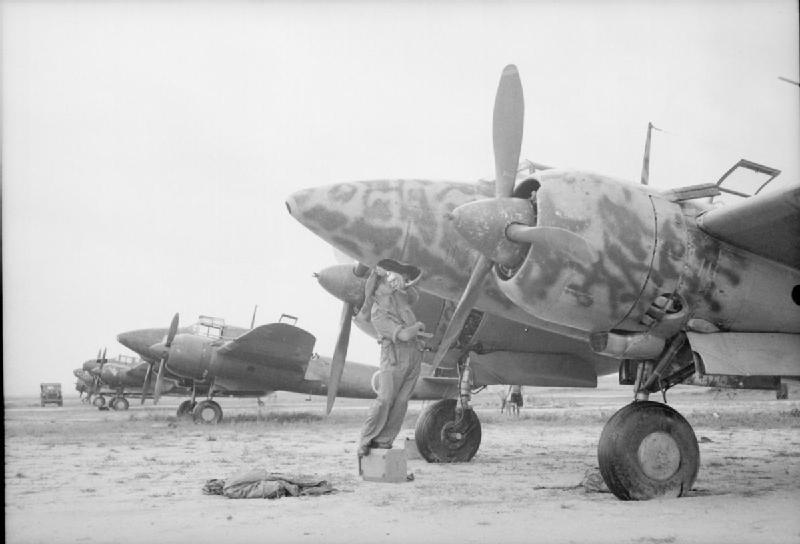
Ki-45's at Singapore

The Japanese Third Air Army (第3航空軍, Kōkū gun) was formed on 23 July 1942 and headquartered at Singapore until the end of World War 2, when it was disbanded. Its final commander was Satoshi Kinoshita. Its units consisted of the 5th, 9th and 55th Air Divisions. The 3rd Air Army was responsible for South East Asia.

== History ==
The 3rd Air Army in December 1941 consisted of the following units:

- 3rd Air Brigade (第3飛行団, Hikōdan) - Endo
- 7th Air Brigade (第7飛行団, Hikōdan) - Phnom Penh
- 10th Air Brigade (第10飛行団, Hikōdan) - Krakor
- 12th Air Brigade (第12飛行団, Hikōdan) - Phiqouc
- 50th Recon Squadron - Kompong Trach
- 81st Recon Squadron - Phnom Penh

== Task ==
The 3rd Air Army was tasked with defending the oil fields and refineries at Palembang as well as supporting operation in the Dutch East Indies, Burma, Thailand, and French Indo-China.

== Commanders ==
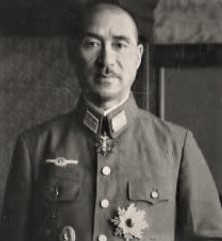
Lieutenant General Michio Sugawara

- Lieutenant General Sugawara Michio (菅原道大 中将) - 9 July 1942 to 30 April 1943
- Lieutenant General Hideyoshi Obata (小畑英良 中将) - 1 May 1943 to 6 December 1943
- Lieutenant General Satoshi Kinoshita (木下敏 中将) - 7 December 1943 to its disbandment

== Units ==
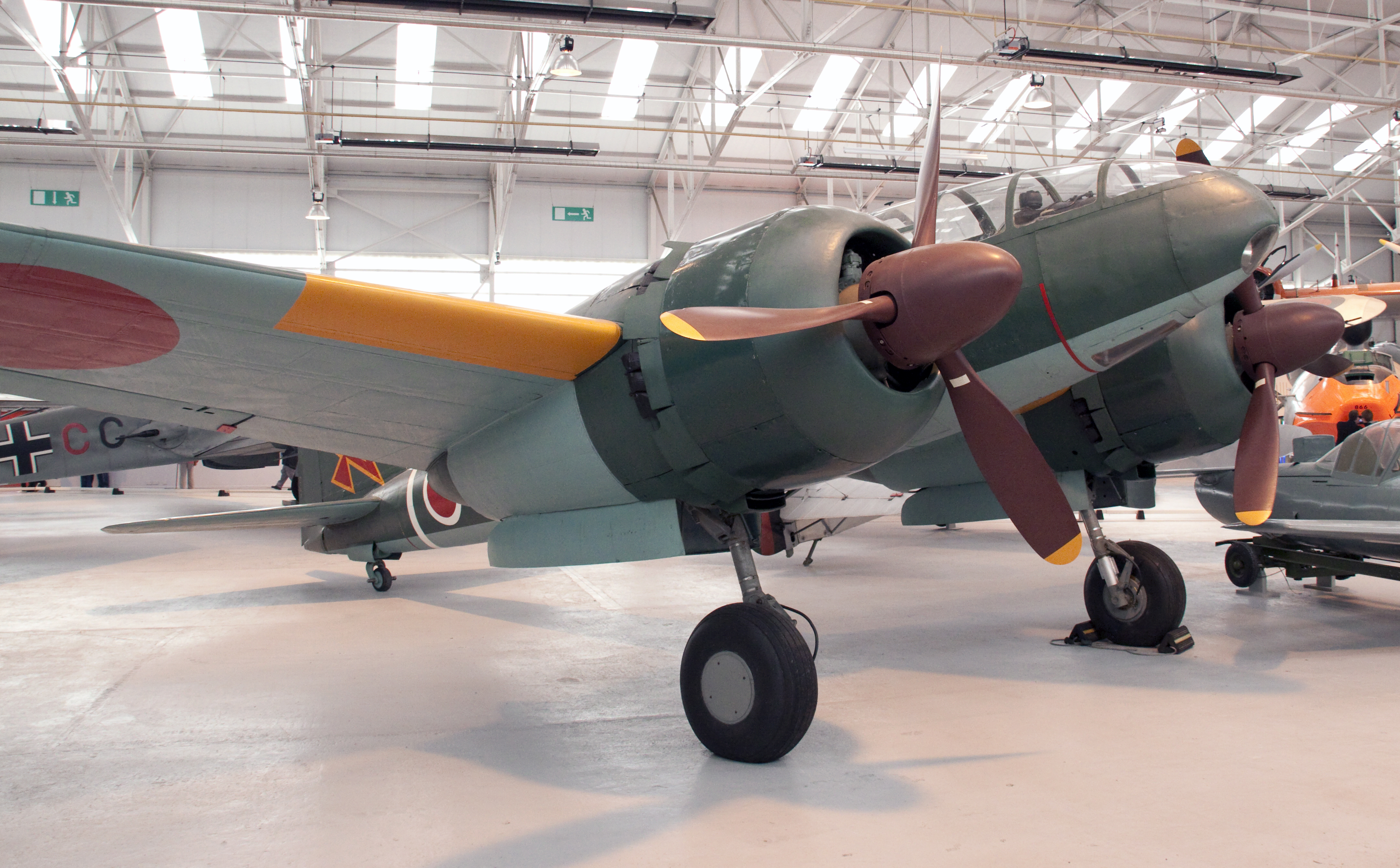
Mitsubishi Ki-46 from Malaya

The Air Army (航空軍, Kōkū gun) was made up of two or more Air Corps (飛行集団, Hikō Shudan (renamed Air Divisions (飛行師団, Hikō Shidan in 1942) plus some Independent Units. Each Air Division consisted of an Air Brigade (飛行団, Hikōdan) together with base and support units and a number of Independent Squadrons. Each Air Brigade had two or more Air Combat Groups (Air Combat Group (飛行戦隊, Hikō Sentai). The Air Combat Group was a single-purpose unit consisting typically of three Squadrons (飛行隊, Hikōtai), divided into three flights (小隊, shōtai) of three aircraft each.

In 1944 the Air Combat Groups were redesignated Squadrons (飛行隊, Hikōtai).

- 5th Hikō Shidan (第5飛行師団) - based in Burma and French Indo China

Mitsubishi Ki-21 heavy bombers
Mitsubishi Ki-30 light bombers
Kawasaki Ki-48 light bombers
Nakajima Ki-27 fighters
Nakajima Ki-43 fighters
Mitsubishi Ki-15 Command Reconnaissance aircraft
Mitsubishi Ki-46 Command Reconnaissance aircraft

- 9th Hikō Shidan (第9飛行師団) - based at Palembang

Mitsubishi Ki-51 light bomber/dive bomber
Nakajima Ki-44 fighters
Nakajima Ki-43 fighters
Kawasaki Ki-45 heavy fighters
Mitsubishi Ki-46 Command Reconnaissance aircraft

- 55th Hikō Shidan (第55飛行師団)
- Independent 10th Wing - based in Borneo in 1945
- 3rd Aviation Communications Command

== Further information ==
- Imperial Japanese Army Air Service
- List of air divisions of the Imperial Japanese Army
