= Second Air Army (Japan) =

The Japanese Second Air Army (第2航空軍, Kōkū gun) was formed on 23 July 1942 and headquartered at Xinjing.

== History ==
In June 1942 (Showa 17), the Kwantung Army's air corps was reorganized and organized, and was responsible for air defense in Manchuria. Initially, the 2nd and 4th Flight Divisions were subordinated, but due to the reorganization on May 12, 1944, both divisions were transferred to the south.

In August 1945 (Showa 20) the war ended while the 2nd Air Army was engaged in fighting with the Soviet Union.

== Commanders ==
- Lieutenant General Yorimichi Suzuki - 1 June 1942 to 18 May 1943
- Lieutenant General Torashirō Kawabe - 19 May 1943 to 7 August 1944
- Lieutenant General Giichi Itahana - 8 August 1944 to 1 June 1945
- Lieutenant General Uichiro Harada - 1 June 1945 until war's end

== Chief of Staff ==
- Maj. Gen. Tetsukuma Fujimoto - 1 June 1942
- Maj. Gen. Kawakami - 19 May 1943
- Maj. Gen. Yoshinaga Park - 20 June 1944
- Maj. Gen. Furuya Kenzo - 16 July 1945

== Final HQ composition ==
- Colonel Eiichi Fukai
- Lieutenant Colonel Katsuo Sato (Strategy)
- Major Tsuruyoshi Shuto (rear)
- Major Ryo Fujita (Information)
- Major Kiyotoshi Goto
- Major Arimori Genji
- Major Keiichi Yamada
- Senior Adjutant General: Colonel Kiyoshi Furukawa
- Weapons Director: Colonel Masao Hasegawa
- Accounting Manager: Tadao Yamaguchi, Colonel
- Surgeon Director: Maj. Gen. Miyoshi
- Special Information Manager: Lieutenant Colonel Ryuichi Asami

== Final units ==
- Independent 15th Squadron: Maj. Gen. Imakawa
- Flight 104th Squadron
- 2nd Aviation District Command
- 14th Aviation District Command
- 28th Aviation District Command
- 57th Aviation District Command
- 58th Aviation District Command
- Independent 101st Education Wing: Maj. Gen. Mitsuyuki Shikata
- 2nd Air Army 1st Education Corps
- 2nd Aviation Regiment
- 8th Aviation Regiment
- 3rd Aviation Information Regiment
- 11th Aviation Information Regiment
- 5th Aerial Spotting Corps
- 12th Aerial Spotting Corps
- 8th Aerial Spotting Corps
- 2nd Civilian Aerial Spotting Corps
- 4th Air Route
- 2nd Meteorological Regiment
- Kwantung Army Aviation Factory: Maj. Gen. Taki Noboru
- 9th Field War Aviation Repair Factory
- 10th Field War Aviation Repair Factory
- 11th Field War Aviation Repair Factory
- 12th Field War Aviation Repair Factory
- Field 8 Air Supply Depot
- 9th Field Battle Air Supply Depot
- 11th Field Battle Air Supply Depot
