= List of air divisions of the Imperial Japanese Army =

Air Groups (Air Divisions) of the Imperial Japanese Army were units typically formed by aggregating several (4-8) aviation regiments (Sentais) for the training or large-scale military operations.

== List of Air Divisions ==
Name	Kanji	Formed	Dissolved	Callsign	Location, notes
Provisional Air Division (Japan)	航空兵団	1 August 1936	1 June 1942	-	Tokyo-North China-Manchuria
1st Air Division (Japan)	第1飛行師団	10 June 1938	1945	Tip (鏑, Kabura) 1045	Kakamigahara-Sapporo-Obihiro, was dissolved in 1942 and re-formed in 1943
2nd Air Division (Japan)	第2飛行師団	24 July 1937	17 May 1945	Vulture (鷲, Tip; Washi)	Manchuria-Philippines (1944)-Singapore (1945)
3rd Air Division (Japan)	第3飛行師団	15 April 1942	14 February 1944	Hawk (隼, Hayabusa) 2375	China-French Indochina-Dutch East Indies-Myanmar-China
4th Air Division (Japan)	第4飛行師団	15 April 1942	1944/1945	Wing (翼, Tsubasa)	Manchuria-Philippines (1944) merged in 2nd Air Division
5th Air Division (Japan)	第5飛行師団	15 April 1942	1945	High (高, Taka)	Myanmar-Phnom Penh(1945)
6th Air Division (Japan)	第6飛行師団	26 November 1942	1 August 1944	Ocean (洋, hiroshi)	Rabaul-New Guinea
7th Air Division (Japan)	第7飛行師団	28 January 1943	21 July 1945	Raid (襲)	New Guinea-Ambon (1944)-Philippines (1944)
8th Air Division (Japan)	第8飛行師団	10 June 1943	1945	True (誠, Makoto) 18900	Taipei
9th Air Division (Japan)	第9飛行師団	10 December 1943	1945	Soaring (翔, Kakeru)	Palembang
10th Air Division (Japan)	第10飛行師団	8 March 1944	1945	Soaring Ambition (天翔, Tensho)	Tokyo
11th Air Division (Japan)	第11飛行師団	15 July 1944	1945	Soaring Eagles (天鷲, Amawashi)	Taisho Airfield
12th Air Division (Japan)	第12飛行師団	15 July 1944	1945	Soaring Wind (天風, Tenpu)	Kozuki Airfield
13th Air Division (Japan)	第13飛行師団	26 February 1945	1945	Pioneer Hawks (隼魁)	Hanguchi
51st Air Division (Japan)	第51飛行師団	?	1945	?	?
52nd Air Division (Japan)	第52飛行師団	1935	1945	?	former Kumagayari flight school
53rd Air Division (Japan)	第53飛行師団	?	1945	?	?
54th Air Division (Japan)	第54飛行師団	?	1945	?	?
55th Air Division (Japan)	第55飛行師団	?	1945	?	?
Teishin Shudan	第1挺進集団	?	1945	?	paratroopers
Tachikawa Training Air Maintenance division	立川教導航空整備師団	20 June 1944	1945	?	former Tachikawa flight school in Tachikawa Airfield
Mito Training Air Transport division	水戸教導航空通信師団	May 1945	1945	?	former Army air transport school in Ibaraki Airport
Shimoshidu Training Air division	下志津教導飛行師団	June 1945	1945	?	former Shimoshidu air school in Wakaba-ku
Akenokyo Training Air division	明野教導飛行師団	June 1945	1945	?	former Akenokyo air school in Obata, Mie
Hitachi Training Air division	常陸教導飛行師団	November 1944	1945	?	former Hitachi air school in Hitachi, Ibaraki, split from Akenokyo flight school in March 1944
Hokota Training Air division	鉾田教導飛行師団	June 1944	1945	?	former Hokota air school in Hokota, Ibaraki
Hamamatsu Training Air division	浜松教導飛行師団	June 1944	1945	?	former Hamamatsu Army air school in Hamamatsu
Utsunomiya Training Air division	宇都宮教導飛行師団	June 1944	1945	?	former Shirokiko Army air school in Tokorozawa, Saitama, later in Northeast China.

== See also ==
- List of Japanese armored divisions
- List of Japanese infantry divisions
