= List of Japanese government and military commanders of World War II =

This article provides a comprehensive overview of key leaders who played pivotal roles in Japan’s political and military governance during the Second World War. Covering influential figures from heads of state to high-ranking military officers.

== Central government ==
=== Supreme head of state ===
- Hirohito, Emperor of Japan: Supreme Commander-in-Chief of the Imperial Armed Forces, head of state, and representative of the "Imperial Sun Lineage", State Shinto and Worship national god image, and chief of the Ministry of the Imperial Household.

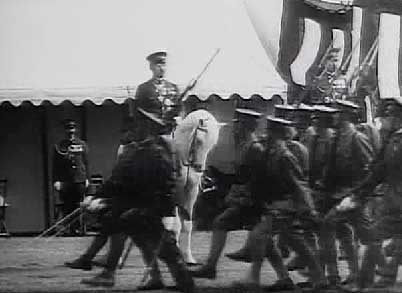
Soldiers parading before emperor Shōwa on imperial stallion Shirayuki

=== President of the Imperial Council ===
- Yoshimichi Hara: President of the "Imperial Council" and "Imperial Throne Council of War" also the Emperor's representatives

=== Chairman of the Imperial Advisory Council ===
- Kantarō Suzuki: Chairman of the Imperial Advisory Council

=== Imperial family members ===
The following were closely involved in the government and military of Japan:

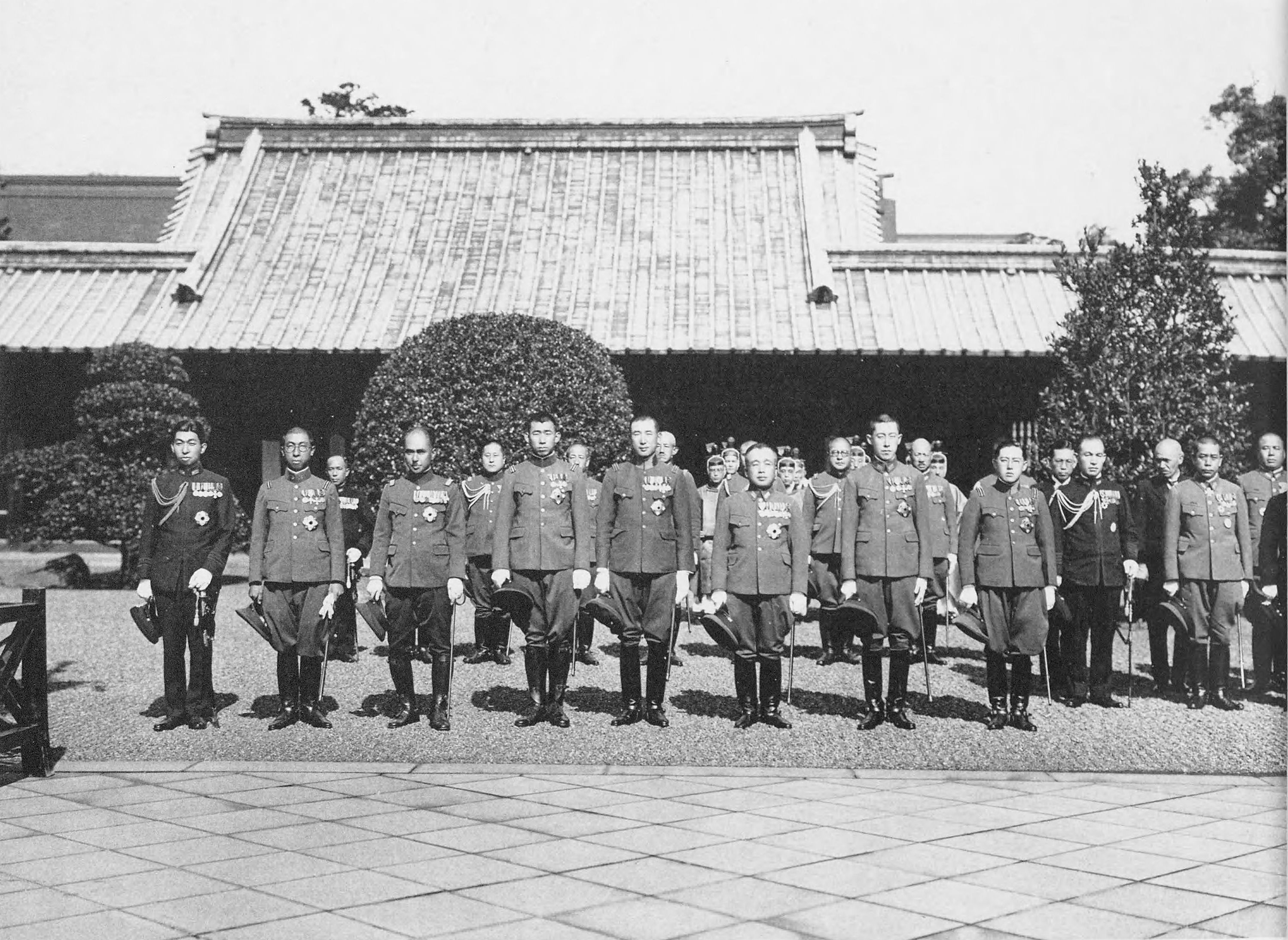
Members of the Japanese and Korean imperial families at the Yasukuni Shrine, 1938

- Prince Asaka Yasuhiko
- Prince Chichibu
- Prince Fushimi Hiroyasu
- Prince Fushimi Hiroyoshi
- Prince Mikasa
- Prince Nashimoto Morimasa
- Prince Higashikuni Naruhiko
- Prince Higashikuni Morihiro
- Prince Takamatsu
- Prince Takeda Tsuneyoshi
- Prince Kan'in Kotohito
- Prince Kan'in Haruhito
- Prince Kaya Tsunenori
- Prince Kitashirakawa Naruhisa
- Prince Kitashirakawa Nagahisa
- Prince Kuni Asaakira
- Prince Yamashina Takehiko
- Prince Yi Un (Crown Prince of Korea)

=== Vice Chairman of the Councilors of Court ===
- Kantarō Suzuki: Vice-chairman of the Councilors of Court

=== Prime Ministers ===
- Senjuro Hayashi: Prime Minister, Commander-in-Chief of Kwantung Army, Minister of War, member of Imperial Privy Council amongst political adviser in Taisei Yokusankai
- Kōki Hirota: Prime Minister, also chief of secret services in the Black Dragon Society
- Fumimaro Konoe: Prime Minister; in his second term organized the Tonarigumi organization, Nation Service Society official government syndicate, and Taisei Yokusankai (Imperial Rule Assistance Association) group amongst official expert of Jews affairs
- Hiranuma Kiichirō: General in Imperial Forces, Prime Minister, Home Affairs and Justice Minister, chief of Keishicho Police forces, Minister without Portfolio, founder and leader in Shintoist Rites Research Council amongst Last President of Imperial Privy Council
- Nobuyuki Abe: Imperial Army General, Prime Minister, member of Imperial Privy Council, political adviser in militarist Genro grouping and last Governor in Chosen
- Mitsumasa Yonai:Imperial Navy Admiral, Prime Minister, Minister of Marine, Chief of War Relief Association, expert in Jews topics amongst Imperial and Supreme War Councillor
- Hideki Tōjō: Prime Minister, Home Affairs Minister, Education Minister, Trade Minister, War Minister, Head of Kodoha Party; also Commander-in-Chief of Japanese Imperial Forces in same period, also led the Keishicho (Tokyo Metropolitan Police Department); also was for some time head of the Munitions Ministry.
- Koiso Kuniaki: Prime Minister and head of Ministry of Greater East Asia (Japan), Vice-Minister of War, also commander of the Imperial Volunteer Corps defensive organization
- Kantarō Suzuki: Imperial Navy Admiral, Marine Minister, Military Councillor, Grand Chamberlain and Privy Councilor, later Prime Minister
- Prince Higashikuni Naruhiko: Prime Minister, Staff Officer, Army General Staff Headquarters, Military Councilor, Chief of the Army Aeronautical Department, and Commander-in-Chief of the Home Defense Headquarters

=== Chief Cabinet Secretary ===
- Kenji Tomita: Chief Cabinet Secretary in Minister Konoe period

=== Military Secretary to Prime Minister ===
- Makoto Matsutani: Military Secretary to Prime Minister

=== Lord Keeper of the Privy Seal ===
- Makino Nobuaki (30 March 1925 – 26 February 1935)
- Saitō Makoto (26 February 1935 – 26 February 1936)
- Ichiki Kitokuro (6 March 1936 – 6 March 1936)
- Yuasa Kurahei (6 March 1936 – 1 June 1940)
- Kōichi Kido (1 June 1940 – 24 November 1945)

=== Imperial Privy Council ===
President of Privy Council

- Yoshimichi Hara: President of Privy Council
- Hiranuma Kiichirō: Last President of Privy Council

Privy Councillors

- Jirō Minami: Privy Councillor
- Kantarō Suzuki: Privy Councillor
- Nobuyuki Abe: Privy Councillor
- Hiranuma Kiichirō: Privy Councillor
- Senjuro Hayashi: Privy Councillor
- Shigeru Honjō: Privy Councillor
- Hideki Tōjō: Privy Councilor

=== Imperial State Council ===
- Sadao Araki: State Councillor

=== Imperial Aide to the Crown Prince ===
- Takeji Nara: Imperial Aide to the Kōtaishi (Crown Prince)

=== Military Aide-de-Camp ===
- Shigeru Hasunuma: Chief Aide-de-Camp to the Emperor
- Takeji Nara: Chief Aide-de Camp to the Emperor
- Kazumoto Machijiri: Aide-de-Camp to the Emperor
- Shunroku Hata: Senior Aide-de-Camp to the Emperor
- Korechika Anami: Aide-de-Camp to the Emperor
- Shigeru Honjō: Aide-de-Camp to the Emperor
- Hakaru Yano: Aide-de-Camp to the Emperor
- Yoshikazu Nishi: Aide-de-Camp to the Emperor
- Tasuku Okada: Aide-de-Camp to Prince Kotohito Kanin
- Masaharu Homma: Aide-de-Camp to Prince Yasuhito Chichibu
- Takushiro Hattori: Aide-de-Camp/Adjutant to Field Marshal (Prince) Nashimoto
- Shoichi Muranaka: Aide-de-camp of Commander Komatsubara during Nomonhan Incident

=== Grand Chamberlain ===
- Makoto Saito: Grand Chamberlain in period of Imperial Colors Incident
- Kantarō Suzuki: Grand Chamberlain
- Saburo Hyakutake: Grand Chamberlain
- Hisanoru Fujita: Grand Chamberlain

=== House of Representatives ===
- Juji Kasai: member of House of Representatives of Japan (government supporter)
- Kingoro Hashimoto: member in House of Representatives of Japan, defender of official policies

=== House of Peers ===
- Satō Tetsutarō: Member in House of Peers
- Aisuke Kabayama: Member of House of Peers (partner of government policies in first stages)
- Teiichi Suzuki: Imperial candidate to House of Peers
- Kenkichi Yoshizawa: Member of House of Peers
- Prince Higashikuni Morihiro: Member in House of Peers
- Nobuyuki Abe: Member in House of Peers
- Naoki Hoshino: Member in House of Peers

== Imperial Supreme War Command (1937–1945) ==
Supreme Commander-in-Chief of Imperial Armed Forces

- Emperor Hirohito: Supreme Commander-in-Chief of the Imperial Japanese Army and the Imperial Japanese Navy (Article XI of the Meiji Constitution of 1889).

He also led the Imperial Supreme War Council conferences and meetings, in some cases a member of the Imperial Family was sent to represent him at such strategic conferences.

=== Imperial General Headquarters (Dai Honei) ===
Established in 1937

Commander

- Emperor Shōwa

Minister of War

- Hajime Sugiyama : War minister
- Seishirō Itagaki : War minister
- Shunroku Hata : War minister
- Hideki Tōjō: War Minister
- Korechika Anami: War Minister

Japanese Army Strategic Thought Group

- Strike North Group - Strategist thought group dominated by the Imperial Japanese Army

Aide to War Minister, IGHQ

- Joichiro Sanada: Aide to War Minister, IGHQ

Staff officer IGHQ

- Torashirō Kawabe: Army Staff officer, IGHQ
- Prince Mikasa: Army Staff officer, IGHQ
- Okikatsu Arao: concurrently Army Staff Officer, IGHQ
- Takushiro Hattori: Army Staff Officer, IGHQ
- Keiji Suzuki: Army Staff officer IGHQ

Operations Bureau's Organization and Mobilization Section, IGHQ

- Saburo Hayashi: Chief of Operations Bureau's Organization and Mobilization Section, IGHQ
- Seijun Inada: Chief of Operations Bureau's Organization and Mobilization Section, IGHQ

Russian Section of Intelligence Department, IGHQ

- Saburo Hayashi: Chief of Russian Section of Intelligence Department, IGHQ

Army Inner Liaison (Army Section), Military Affairs Bureau, Army Ministry, IGHQ

- Masao Inaba:Army inner liaison (Army Section), Military Affairs Bureau, Army Ministry, IGHQ

Imperial Japanese Army General Staff (Tokyo HQ)

- Prince Kan'in Kotohito: Chief of Army General Staff
- Hajime Sugiyama: Chief of Army General Staff
- Hideki Tōjō: Chief of Army General Staff
- Yoshijirō Umezu: Chief of Army General Staff

Army Zone Commands

Army Regional Commands

Army Tactical Commands

General Command of Southern Army

- Hisaichi Terauchi: Commander of Southern Army
- Takazo Numata: Vice-Commander of Southern Army

Army Tactical Commands

Army High Level Inner Liaison with Army General Staff, IGHQ

- Shuichi Miyazaki: Chief, First Bureau, Army General Staff Headquarters, attended operational liaison conference between IGHQ, Southern Army, and Fourteenth Area Army (Manila)

Minister of the Navy

- Yonai Mitsumasa: Marine Minister
- Koshiro Oikawa : Marine minister
- Shigetarō Shimada: Marine Minister

Japanese Navy Strategic Thinking Group

- Strike South Group - Strategists thinking group dominated by the Imperial Japanese Navy

Imperial Japanese Navy General Staff (Tokyo HQ)

- Hiroyasu Fushimi : Chief of Navy General Staff
- Osami Nagano: Chief of Navy General Staff
- Shigetarō Shimada: Chief of Navy General Staff
- Koshiro Oikawa: Chief of Navy General Staff
- Soemu Toyoda: Chief of Navy General Staff
- Shigeru Fukudome: Vice-Chief of Navy General Staff

Navy General Staff of Combined Fleet (Japan, later Truk HQ)

- Isoroku Yamamoto: Chief of General Staff of Combined Fleet
- Matome Ugaki: Vice-Chief of General Staff of Combined Fleet
- Mineichi Koga: Chief of General Staff of Combined Fleet
- Shigeru Fukudome: Vice-Chief of General Staff of Combined Fleet

Navy Tactical Commands

Navy-Army General Staff (IGHQ) Liaison Officer

- Takushiro Hattori: Member (Army-Navy high level liaison), Naval General Staff; Naval Staff Officer (Operations) IGHQ; Section Chief (Operations), Army General Staff, IGHQ; Army Section Member, Naval General Staff Naval Staff Officer, IGHQ (Operations).
- Joichiro Sanada: Chief, Second Section, (Army-Navy high level liaison) Army General Staff Headquarters; Staff Officer, IGHQ (Navy Section)

Inspectorate General of Military Training IGHQ

- Rikichi Andō: Vice-Chief Inspectorate General of Military Training
- Sadao Araki: Inspector General of Military Training
- Shunroku Hata: Inspector General of Artillery Training
- Harukichi Hyakutake: Inspector General of Signal Training
- Hitoshi Imamura: Deputy Chief, Inspectorate General of Military Training
- Masatane Kanda: Department Chief, Inspectorate General of Military Training
- Masakazu Kawabe: Section Member, Inspectorate General of Military Training
- Heitarō Kimura: Artillery Department, Office of Military Training
- Kenzo Kitano: Section Member, Inspectorate General of Military Training
- Shigenori Kuroda: Office of Military Training
- Jinsaburo Mazaki: Section Chief, Office of Military Training; also Inspector General of Military Training
- Hajime Sugiyama: Inspector General of Military Training
- Akira Mutō: Member, Inspectorate General of Military Training
- Tasuku Okada: Member, Inspectorate General of Military Training
- Ichiro Shichida: Section Chief, Inspectorate General of Military Training
- Tokumatsu Shigeta: Inspector General of Artillery Training
- Sōsaku Suzuki: Chief, 2nd Section, Inspectorate General of Military Training
- Shinichi Tanaka: Section Member, Inspectorate General of Military Training
- Hisaichi Terauchi: Inspector General of Military Training
- Otozō Yamada: Office of Cavalry Training (Inspectorate General of Military Training)
- Prince Un Yi: Attached to Inspectorate-General of Military Training
- Nobuyushi Muto: Inspector-General of Military Training
- Yoshikazu Nishi: Inspector-General of Military Training

Inspectorate General of Aviation IGHQ

- Tomoyuki Yamashita: Inspector general of Army Aviation
- Prince Mikasa: Inspector general of Army Aviation
- Torashirō Kawabe: Deputy Chief, Inspectorate General of Air Force
- Korechika Anami: Inspector General of Army Aviation
- Hideki Tōjō: Inspector General of Army Aviation
- Kenji Doihara: Inspector General of Army Aviation

=== Imperial Supreme War Council (Senso-shi-do) ===
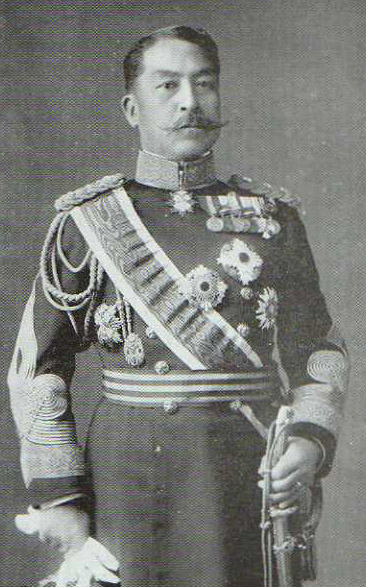
Prince Kotohito Kan'in at the time of the Russo-Japanese War

Chief Secretary of Supreme War Council

- Akira Mutō: Chief Secretary of Supreme War Council
- Mineo Ōsumi: Chief Secretary of Supreme War Council

Supreme War Councilor

- Nobutake Kondō: Appointed to the Supreme War Council
- Mitsumasa Yonai: Supreme War Councilor
- Soemu Toyoda: Supreme War Councilor
- Shigetarō Shimada: Appointed to Supreme War Council
- Prince Fushimi Hiroyasu: Supreme War Councilor
- Prince Un Yi: Member of the Supreme War Council
- Waichirō Sonobe: Member of the Supreme War Council
- Sadao Araki: Member Supreme War Council
- Saburo Ando: Member Supreme War Council
- Prince Asaka Yasuhiko: Member Supreme War Council
- Prince Higashikuni Naruhiko: Member Supreme War Council
- Shigeru Honjō: Member Supreme War Council
- Shunroku Hata: Member Supreme War Council
- Kenji Dohihara: Member Supreme War Council
- Hisaichi Terauchi: Member of the Supreme War Council
- Prince Nashimoto Morimasa: Member of the Supreme War Council
- Prince Kaya Tsunenori: Member of the Supreme War Council
- Prince Kan'in Kotohito: Member of the Supreme War Council
- Hajime Sugiyama: Member of the Supreme War Council
- Yoshijirō Umezu: Member of the Supreme War Council
- Jinzaburō Masaki: Member of the Supreme War Council
- Hideki Tōjō: Member of the Supreme War Council
- Yoshikazu Nishi: Member of the Supreme War Council
- Tomoyuki Yamashita: Member of the Supreme War Council
- Shigeatsu Yamaoka: Member of the Supreme War Council
- Takeo Yasuda: Member of the Supreme War Council

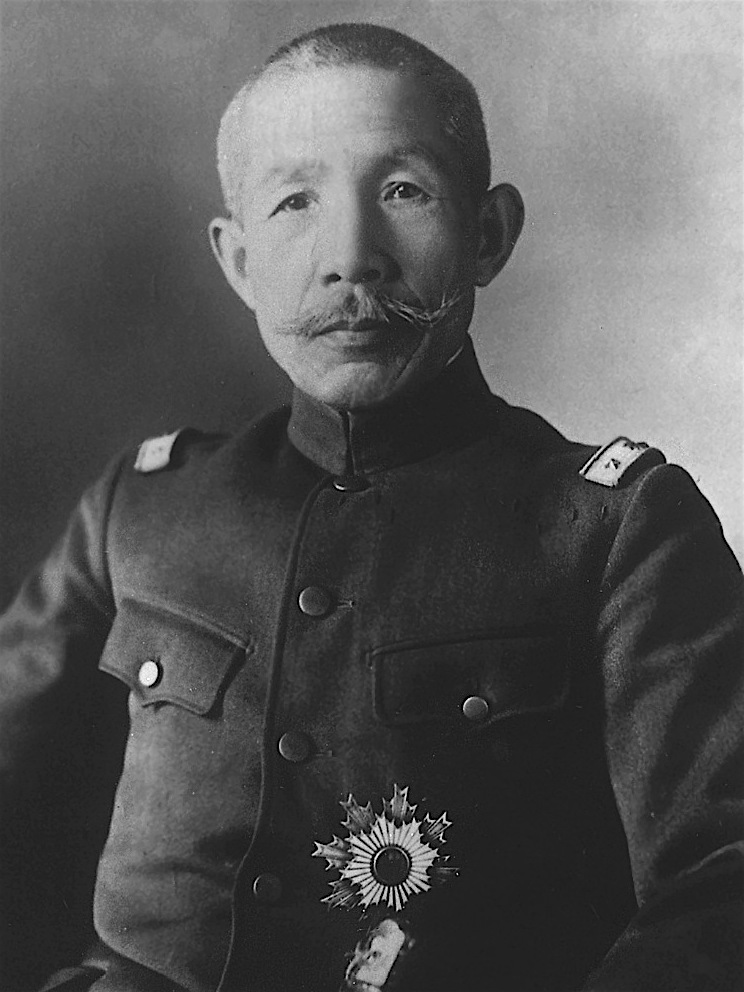
General Sadao Araki

Military Councilors

- Sadao Araki: Military Councilor
- Hisaichi Terauchi: Military Councilor
- Kantarō Suzuki: Military Councilor
- Hajime Sugiyama: concurrently Military Councilor
- Korechika Anami: concurrently Military Councilor
- Kenji Doihara: Military Councilor
- Shunroku Hata: Military Councilor
- Naruhiko Higashikuni: Military Councilor
- Jinsaburo Mazaki: Military Councilor
- Yasuji Okamura: Military Councilor
- Takeo Yasuda: Military Councilor
- Prince Kan'in Kotohito: Military Councilor
- Osami Nagano: Military Councilor
- Shizuichi Teramoto: Military Councillor

"Imperial Throne Council of War"

President of the Imperial Throne Council of War

- Yoshimichi Hara: President of the Imperial Throne Council of War

Imperial War Councilor

- Mitsumasa Yonai: Imperial War Councilor
- Shigetarō Shimada: Appointed to Imperial War Council

== Home Defence ==
=== Home Defense Headquarters ===
- Otozō Yamada: Commander-in-Chief, Home Defense Headquarters
- Prince Higashikuni Naruhiko: Commander-in-Chief, Home Defense Headquarters

Organization

- Fifth Area Army and Northern Army District (Sapporo)
- Eleventh Area Army and Northeastern Army District (Sendai)
- Twelfth Area Army and Eastern Army District (Tokyo)
- Thirteenth Area Army and Tokai Army District (Nagoya)
- Fifteenth Area Army and Central Army District (Osaka)
- Shikoku Army District (Zentsuji)
- Sixteenth Area Army and Western Army District (Fukuoka)
- Seventeenth Area Army and Korea Army District (Seoul)
- Tenth Area Army and Formosa Army District (Taipei)
- Imperial General Headquarters in Matsushiro Fortress, Nagano Prefecture

=== Tokyo metropolitan area ===
- Toshizō Nishio: Governor of the Tokyo metropolitan area; also was commander of civil law enforcement divisions in the metropolitan area, including Keishicho, Tokkō, Kempeitai and Tokeitai metropolitan units. The Imperial Guards remained under their own commander, who reported directly to the Emperor.

=== Tokyo Divisional District ===
- Jo Iimura: Commanding General, Tokyo Defense Army; concurrently Commanding General, Tokyo Divisional District

=== Tokyo Defense Command ===
- Yoshikazu Nishi: Commander Officer of Tokyo Defence Command

=== Tokyo Garrison Headquarters ===
- Kiichiro Higuchi: Staff Officer, Tokyo Garrison Headquarters
- Joichiro Sanada: Staff Officer, Tokyo Garrison Command

=== Tokyo Bay Fortress Detachment Officers ===
- Shihei Oba: Commanding General, Tokyo Bay Fortress, concurrently Commanding General, Tokyo Bay Detachment
- Tokumatsu Shigeta: Staff Officer, Tokyo Bay Fortress Detachment

=== Maizuru Fortified Zone ===
- Kanji Ishiwara: Commanding General, Maizuru Fortified Zone

=== Tsushima Fortress Detachment ===
- Kiyotake Kawaguchi: recalled to active duty, Commanding General, Tsushima Fortress
- List of Army Fortresses in Japan proper

=== Officer assigned to General Defense Command ===
- Shōjirō Iida: assigned to General Defense Command

=== Shinbu Group (Fourteenth Area Army command) ===
- Shizuo Yokoyama: Commanding General, Shinbu Group (Fourteenth Area Army command)

=== Northeastern Army District Headquarters (Japan Proper) ===
- Sinichi Tanaka: attached to Northeastern Army District Headquarters (Japan Proper)

=== Northern District Army Command ===
- Kiichiro Higuchi: concurrently Commanding General, Northern District Army Command

=== Western Army District HQ ===
- Kanji Nishihara: attached to Western Army District Headquarters

=== Western District Army Command ===
- Shizuo Sakaguchi: attached to Western District Army Command

=== Central District Army Headquarters ===
- Joichiro Sanada: Central District Army Headquarters

=== Central District Army Command ===
- Masakazu Kawabe: concurrently Commanding General, Central District Army Command

=== Chosen Army District ===
- Seishirō Itagaki: concurrently Commanding General, Chosen District Army Command

== War Ministries ==
=== Munitions Minister ===
- Hideki Tōjō: Concurrent chief of the Munitions Ministry, as Army figure in same Ministry
- Nobusuke Kishi: As sometimes replaced at Gen Tojo in lead of Munitions Minister
- Ginjirō Fujiwara: in charge of the Munitions Ministry
- Shigeru Yoshida: Munitions Minister
- Teijirō Toyoda: Marine and Munitions Ministry, as Navy figure in such Ministry
- Takijiro Ohnishi: Chief of naval aviation development, a division of the Munitions Ministry; also father of the "Kamikaze" special forces
- Chikuhei Nakajima: Munitions Minister and aircraft industrialist as linked with Army

=== Material Section, War Ministry ===
- Hiroo Sato: Chief, Material Section, War Ministry

=== Sagami Army Arsenal ===
- Tasuku Okada: Chief, Sagami Army Arsenal

=== Tokyo Army Arsenal ===
- Kijirō Nambu: Chief, Tokyo Army Arsenal; he also founded and led Nambu Arms Manufacturing Company during wartime

=== Army Remount Department ===
- Minoru Sasaki: Member, Army Remount Department

=== Inspector General of Chemical Warfare ===
- Kanji Nishihara: Inspector General of Chemical Warfare
- Kazumoto Machijiri: Inspector General of Chemical Warfare

=== Officer in Inspectorate General ===
- Shinichi Tanaka: Chief of Staff, Inspectorate General, LOC

=== Army Section, Imperial General Headquarters ===
- Prince Mikasa: Staff officer in the Army Section of the Imperial General Headquarters

=== Ōita PW Internment Camp Staff ===
- Akira Mutō: member of Ōita PW Internment Camp staff

=== Army Allied Prisoner of War Information Bureau ===
- Hitoshi Hamada: Deputy Chief Supervisor of Allied Prisoner of War Information Bureau

Army Commanders of Military Prisons and POW Camps in occupied territories

- Lieutenant-General Igatu: General Officer Commanding Prisoner of War Camps Philippines
- Shinpei Fukei: Commandant Prisoner of War Camps, Singapore
- Major-General Arimina: Commandant Changi Jail, Singapore

=== War Minister ===
- Prince Higashikuni Naruhiko: Minister of War
- Senjuro Hayashi: Minister of War
- Hajime Sugiyama: Minister of War
- Sadao Araki: Minister of War
- Jirō Minami: Minister of War
- Shunroku Hata: Minister of War
- Kazushige Ugaki: Minister of War
- Yoshijirō Umezu: Minister of War
- Seishirō Itagaki: Minister of War
- Hideki Tōjō: Minister of War
- Korechika Anami: Minister of War
- Hisaichi Terauchi: Minister of War
- Shigenori Kuroda: Minister of War
- Nobuyuki Abe: Minister of War

=== Deputy Minister of War ===
- Nobuyuki Abe: Deputy Minister of War

=== Vice-Minister of War ===
- Yoshinori Shirakawa: Vice-Minister of War
- Mikio Furusho: Vice-Minister of War
- Toranosuke Hashimoto: Vice-Minister of War
- Korechika Anami: Vice-Minister of War
- Kazushige Ugaki: War Vice-Minister
- Hajime Sugiyama: Vice-Minister of War
- Hideki Tōjō: Vice-Minister of War
- Heisuke Yanagawa: War Vice-Minister
- Hyotaro Yamada: War Vice-Minister
- Heitarō Kimura: War Vice-Minister
- Koiso Kuniaki: War Vice-Minister
- Masataka Yamawaki: War Vice-Minister

=== Secretary to the War Minister ===
- Joichiro Sanada: Secretary to War Minister; concurrently Adjutant in the same Ministry; Aide to the War Minister; Staff Officer, Tokyo Garrison Command
- Takushiro Hattori: Secretary to the War Minister; Adjutant, War Ministry
- Joichiro Sanada: Aide to War Minister, IGHQ
- Hiroo Sato: Adjutant to the War Minister
- Yoshio Kozuki: Secretary to the War Minister; Adjutant, War Ministry
- Toshizō Nishio: Adjutant, War Ministry; Secretary to the War Minister; Governor, Tokyo Metropolitan area
- Yozo Miyama: Senior Adjutant, War Ministry
- Okitsugu Arao: Secretary to the War Minister

=== Military Affairs Bureau, War Ministry ===
- Kenryo Sato: Chief, Army Affairs Bureau
- Kitsuju Ayabe: Member, Army Affairs Section
- Tetsuzan Nagata: Chief, Military Affairs Bureau
- Hitoshi Imamura: Chief, Military Affairs Bureau, War Ministry
- Kiyotake Kawaguchi: Member, Military Affairs Bureau, War Ministry
- Heitarō Kimura: Chief, Military Administration Bureau, War Ministry
- Masahiko Takeshita: Chief of the Domestic affairs section of the Military Affairs Bureau
- Machijiri Kazumoto: Chief of Army Affairs Section, Military Affairs Bureau, Ministry of War and Head of Military Affairs Bureau, in same Ministry
- Takeji Nara: Head of Military Affairs Bureau, Ministry of War
- Kenji Hatanaka: Officer in Military Affairs Section
- Yoshio Kozuki: assigned to the Military Affairs Bureau
- Tadamichi Kuribayashi: Member, Military Affairs Bureau
- Renya Mutaguchi: Military Affairs Bureau, War Ministry
- Tetsuzan Nagata: Chief, Military Affairs Bureau
- Hidemitsu Nakano: Member, Military Affairs Bureau, War Ministry
- Kanji Nishihara: Section Member, Military Affairs Bureau
- Kengo Noda: Member, Military Affairs Bureau, War Ministry
- Hideyoshi Obata: Member, Military Affairs Bureau, War Ministry
- Sanji Okido: Member, Military Affairs Bureau, War Ministry
- Joichiro Sanada: Chief, Military Affairs Bureau
- Minoru Sasaki: Military Affairs Bureau, War Ministry
- Hajime Sugiyama: Chief, Military Affairs Bureau
- Sōsaku Suzuki: Member, Military Affairs Bureau
- Teiichi Suzuki: Member, Military Affairs Bureau, War Ministry
- Sizuichi Tanaka: Member, Military Affairs Bureau
- Yuitsu Tsuchihashi: Member, Military Affairs Bureau, War Ministry
- Tomoyuki Yamashita: Member and Chief, Army Affairs Section, Military Affairs Bureau, War Ministry
- Takeo Yasuda: Chief, Defense Section, Military Affairs Bureau, War Ministry
- Isamu Yokoyama: Military Affairs Bureau, War Ministry
- Takeji Nara: Head of Military Affairs Bureau, Ministry of War
- Isamu Chō: Attached to Military Affairs Bureau, Ministry of War

=== Economic Mobilization Bureau in War Ministry and related sections ===
- Shigenori Kuroda: Section Chief (Conscription), War Ministry
- Tetsuzan Nagata: Section Chief, Economic Mobilization Bureau
- Koiso Kuniaki: Chief, Materiel Mobilization Bureau, War Ministry
- Heitarō Kimura: Section Chief, Economic Mobilization Bureau, War Ministry
- Kanji Nishihara: attached to Army Technical Department
- Toshishiro Obata: Chief, Operations Bureau, Army General Staff
- Joichiro Sanada: Member, War Ministry Maintenance section; Chief, Army Affairs Section, Military Affairs Bureau, War Ministry
- Minoru Sasaki: Ordnance Bureau, War Ministry, Army Ordnance Main Depot, Mechanized Department
- Sōsaku Suzuki: Army Ordnance, Administration Department
- Kenryo Sato: Chief, Military Affairs Bureau, War Ministry
- Teichii Suzuki: Military Affairs Bureau; concurrently Member of the Cabinet Research Board
- Shinichi Tanaka: Chief, Military Service Section, War Ministry
- Yoshijirō Umezu: Ordnance Bureau, War Ministry
- Isamu Yokoyama: Economic Mobilization Bureau, War Ministry; Section Chief, Planning Bureau, Cabinet Resources Board

=== Personal Bureau of War Ministry ===
- Yaezo Akashiba: Member, Personnel Bureau
- Korechika Anami: Chief, Personnel Bureau
- Yasuji Okamura: Chief, Assignments Section, Personnel Bureau, War Ministry
- Tan Nukata: Chief, Personnel Bureau, War Ministry
- Sanji Okido: attached to Personnel Bureau, War Ministry
- Otozō Yamada: Chief, Personnel Bureau

=== Press Relations Branch, Ministry of War ===
- Masaharu Homma: Chief of Press Relations Branch, Ministry of War

=== Army Field Marshal ===
- Prince Kan'in Kotohito:- Field Marshal
- Prince Nashimoto Morimasa:- Field Marshal
- Shunroku Hata:- Field Marshal
- Hisaichi Terauchi:- Field Marshal
- Hajime Sugiyama:- Field Marshal
- Prince Higashikuni Naruhiko:- Field Marshal
- Nobuyoshi Mutō:- Field Marshal

=== Provost Marshal General ===
- Sadao Araki: Provost Marshal General
- Fusataro Teshima: Provost Marshal General (LtGen)
- Shigeru Taiboku: Provost Marshal General
- Toranosuke Hashimoto: Provost Marshal General, later the Japanese first priest in Shintoist central Shrine in Xinjing, led the Cultural Japanese entity in Manchukuo, amongst operative leader of Manchoukouan Intelligence services.

=== General Affairs Bureau, Provost Marshal Headquarters ===
- Fusataro Teshima: Chief, General Affairs Bureau, Provost Marshal Headquarters

=== Inspectorate General of Military Training ===
- Rikichi Andō: Vice-Chief Inspectorate General of Military Training
- Sadao Araki: Inspector General of Military Training
- Shunroku Hata: Inspector General of Artillery Training
- Harukichi Hyakutake: Inspector General of Signal Training
- Hitoshi Imamura: Deputy Chief, Inspectorate General of Military Training
- Masatane Kanda: Department Chief, Inspectorate General of Military Training
- Masakazu Kawabe: Section Member, Inspectorate General of Military Training
- Heitarō Kimura: Artillery Department, Office of Military Training
- Kenzo Kitano: Section Member, Inspectorate General of Military Training
- Shigenori Kuroda: Office of Military Training
- Jinsaburo Mazaki: Section Chief, Office of Military Training; also Inspector General of Military Training
- Akira Mutō: Member, Inspectorate General of Military Training
- Tasuku Okada: Member, Inspectorate General of Military Training
- Ichiro Shichida: Section Chief, Inspectorate General of Military Training
- Tokomatsu Shigeta: Inspector General of Artillery Training
- Sōsaku Suzuki: Chief, 2nd Section, Inspectorate General of Military Training
- Sinichi Tanaka: Section Member, Inspectorate General of Military Training
- Hisaichi Terauchi: Inspector General of Military Training
- Otozō Yamada: Office of Cavalry Training (Inspectorate General of Military Training)
- Heisuke Yanagawa: Inspector-General of Cavalry Training

=== Imperial Army-Navy military teaching and training services units ===
See: Military instructors and trainers of the Empire of Japan

=== Army Officers in Reserve list ===
- Sadao Araki: retired, March 1936, later enter in politic activities
- Jirō Minami: placed on reserve list, 1936, later recalled
- Nobuyuki Abe: In 1936 put on reserve list with rank of general
- Rikichi Andō: transferred to reserve list, January 1941; recalled to active duty
- Keisuke Fujie: retired, April 1945; recalled to active duty
- Masaharu Homma: transferred to First Reserve List, August 1943
- Shōjirō Iida: retired, December 1944; later recalled
- Kanji Ishiwara: retired, 1938; recalled to active duty, 1938–40
- Kiyotake Kawaguchi: unassigned list, March 1943; transferred to first reserve list, April 1943
- Teiichi Suzuki: transferred to first reserve list
- Renya Mutaguchi: retired, December 1944
- Toshizō Nishio: placed on reserve list, 1942
- Ichiro Shicida: retired, April 1945; recalled to active duty
- Hideki Tōjō: relieved of all military and political posts, July 1944; retired to first reserve list
- Kioji Tominaga: transferred to first reserve list (Formosa), May 1945
- Koiso Kuniaki: retired to first reserve list, July 1938
- Yoshitoshi Tokugawa: Was entered on Reserve list (1939), for later retirement to civilian life (1939). He was called to operational service during 1944–45.

== Army ==
=== Deputy Chief of Army General Staff ===
- Jun Ushiroku: Senior Deputy Chief of Army General Staff
- Hikosaburo Hata: Second Deputy Chief of Army General Staff
- Torashirō Kawabe: Deputy Chief of Army General Staff
- Hajime Sugiyama: Deputy Chief of Army General Staff

=== Chief of Army General Staff ===
- Prince Kan'in Kotohito: Chief of the Army General Staff
- Hideki Tōjō: Chief of Army General Staff
- Yoshijirō Umezu: Chief of Army General Staff
- Hajime Sugiyama: Chief of Army General Staff

=== Bureau Chief of Army General Staff ===
- Sadao Araki: Bureau Chief of Army General Staff

=== 1st Bureau Chief of Army General Staff ===
- Kitsuju Ayabe: Head 1st Bureau General Staff
- Morikazu Amano: Chief 1st Section General Staff

=== 2nd Bureau Chief of Army General Staff ===
- Seizo Arisue: Head 2nd Bureau General Staff
- Kiichiro Higuchi: Head 2nd Bureau General Staff

=== Vice Chief of Army General Staff ===
- Kiyoshi Imai: Vice Chief of Army General Staff
- Nobuyushi Muto: Vice Chief of Army General Staff

=== Army General Staff ===
- Hideo Iwakuro
- Muraji Yano
- Saburo Hayashi
- Hatazō Adachi
- Rikichi Andō
- Sadao Araki
- Okitsugu Arao
- Kitsuju Ayabe
- Kenji Doihara
- Keisuke Fujie
- Shunroku Hata
- Takushiro Hattori
- Prince Higashikuni Naruhiko
- Kiichiro Higuchi
- Masaharu Homma
- Prince Chichibu
- Harukichi Hyakutake
- Jo Iimura
- Hitoshi Imamura
- Kanji Ishiwara
- Masatane Kanda
- Tadasu Kataoka
- Masakazu Kawabe
- Torashirō Kawabe
- Kiyotake Kawabe
- Heitarō Kimura
- Seiichi Kita
- Kenzo Kitano
- Kuniaki Koiso
- Yoshio Kozuki
- Shuichi Miyazaki
- Takeshi Mori
- Renya Mutaguchi
- Akira Mutō
- Tetsuzan Nagata
- Hidemitsu Nakano
- Mitsuo Nakazawa
- Masahiko Takeshita
- Kengo Noda
- Shihei Oba
- Hideyoshi Obata
- Tasuku Okada
- Sanji Okido
- Minoru Sasaki
- Ichiro Shichida
- Hajime Sugiyama
- Sōsaku Suzuki
- Teiichi Suzuki
- Shinichi Tanaka
- Shizuichi Tanaka
- Kumaichi Teramoto
- Kyoji Tominaga
- Yuitsu Tsuchihashi deputy Chief-of-Staff of China Expeditionary Army in October 1940.
- Toshimichi Uemura
- Otozō Yamada
- Tomoyuki Yamashita
- Isamu Yokoyama
- Shizuo Yokoyama

=== 20th Group - War Coordination, Army General Staff ===
- Makoto Matsutani: Chief, 20th Group-War Coordination, Army General Staff

=== Operations Section, Army General Staff ===
- Seijun Inada: Chief of Operations Section, Army General Staff

=== Third Section-Organization and Mobilization, Army General Staff ===
- Yozo Miyama: Chief, Third Section (Organization and Mobilization), Army General Staff
- Kitsuju Ayabe: Section Chief, Third Section (Organization and Mobilization), Army General Staff

=== Chief of General Intelligence Bureau in Army General Staff ===
- Seizo Arisue: Chief of General Intelligence Bureau in Army General Staff

=== Second Bureau (Intelligence Division), Army General Staff ===
- Major General Okamoto: Chief, Second Bureau (Intelligence Division), Army General Staff, at the time of the outbreak of the Pacific War. His staff consisted of Colonel Kotani, Navy officer Captain Onoda, and Mr.Yosano, Foreign Office Chancellor.
- Seizo Arisue: Chief, Second Bureau (Intelligence Division), Army General Staff
- Harukichi Hyakutake: Chief of the Cryptographic Section (Intelligence Division), Army General Staff

=== Russian unit of Second Bureau (Intelligence Division) Army General Staff ===
- Saburo Hayashi: Commander of Russian unit, Second Bureau (Intelligence) Army General Staff

Japanese Army Intelligence Services units

- Hideki Tōjō, the highest operative Chief in Japanese Army Intelligence Services in wartime
- Prince Takeda Tsuneyoshi as the underground, supreme chief and secret agent in Japanese Secret Service in Manchukuo
- Toranosuke Hashimoto as Operative Commander of Manchoukouan Secret services under the lead of Prince Takeda amongst Kempeitai services
- Torashirō Kawabe Staff Officer (Operations/Intelligence), Kwantung Army
- Kingoro Hashimoto Chief, Special Service Agency, Hailar, Kwantung Army
- Harukichi Hyakutake Chief of the Special Service Agency, Kwantung Army in Harbin
- Kuniaki Koiso leader of Special Services Agency in Manchukuo
- Michitarō Komatsubara intelligence chief of Special Services Agency in Harbin for some time
- Noboyushi Obata (Shinryo) chief of Special Services Agency in Harbin
- Kanji Tsuneoka Directed the Mongol department of Kwantung Army in land and native saboteurs and secret agent units
- Hiroshi Akita Chief of German Section of Japanese Military Intelligence in this period
- Masayoshi Yamamoto Led the Matsu Kikan (Pine Tree) Secret Agency, under command of 19th Army, with HQ in Ambon (Dutch Indies)
- Jinzo Nomoto intelligence officer sent by a unit of the Imperial Japanese Army to Tibet and Sinkiang

=== Army Technical Research Institute ===
- Lieutenant-General Gondo:Director 9th Dept Army Technical Research Institute
- Yoshikazu Nishi: Head of General Affairs Bureau in Technical Research Institute

=== Third Bureau (Logistics), Army General Staff ===
- Tan Nukata: Chief, Third Bureau-Logistics, Army General Staff
- Goro Isoya: Chief, Third Bureau-Logistics, Army General Staff

=== Railways and Shipping section, Army General Staff ===
- Okitsugu Arao: Section Chief (Railways and Shipping), Army General Staff

=== Army Ordnance and Army Shipping Department ===
- Yoshio Kozuki: Commanding General, Shipping Transportation Headquarters
- Sōsaku Suzuki: Army Ordnance, Administration Department; Chief, Army Shipping Department Shipping Transportation Headquarters
- Hideo Baba: General Officer Commanding Army Maritime Transport Command
- Hakaru Gondo: Commanding Officer 13th Shipping Group

=== Chairman of the Military Affairs Bureau ===
- Tetsuzan Nagata: Military Affairs Bureau and Economic Mobilization Bureau
- Kenryo Sato: Chief of the Military Affairs Bureau, Government Planning Board
- Rikichi Andō: Chief, Military Administration Section, Military Administration Bureau
- Renya Mutaguchi: Military Affairs Bureau
- Akiho Ishii: Chief, Military Affairs Section, War Ministry
- Okitsugu Arao: Chief, Army Affairs Section, Military Affairs Bureau
- Susumu Nishiura: Chief, Army Affairs Section, War Ministry
- Tan Nukata: Chief, General Affairs Bureau
- Hitoshi Imamura: Section Chief, Military Affairs Bureau
- Yoshio Kozuki: Military Affairs Bureau and Military Administration Bureau; member Military Administration Bureau
- Kanji Nishihara: Section Member, Military Affairs Bureau; Inspector General of Chemical Warfare
- Takeo Yasuda: Chief, Defense Section, Military Affairs Bureau, War Ministry

=== Commanders Officer Army Home Stations ===
- Masao Iwasa: Commanding Officer Tokyo Home Station
- Jinzaburo Ishitani: Commanding Officer Tsu Home Station, Commanding Officer Ujiyamada Home Station, Commanding Officer Yokkaichi Home Station
- Juzo Hirata: Commanding Officer Shibata Home Station
- Seiji Ikehama: Commanding Officer Ashigawa Home Station and Commanding Officer Obihiro Home Station
- Keinosuke Iizuka: Commanding Officer Akita Home Station
- Tomejiro Hishiki: Commanding Officer Wakamatsu Home Station
- Jūrō Gotō: Commanding Officer Kofu Home Station
- Hisao Harada: Commanding Officer Matsumo Home Station, Commanding Officer Muramatsu Home Station and Commanding Officer Takeda Home Station

=== Army Aeronautical Department ===
Administrative Chief of Administrative Division, Army Aeronautical Department

- Korechika Anami: Chief, Army Aeronautical Department
- Shunroku Hata: Chief, Administrative Division, Army Aeronautical Department
- Prince Higashikuni Naruhiko: Chief, Administrative Division, Army Aeronautical Department
- Takuma Shimoyama: Chief Administrative Division, Army Aeronautical Department
- Michio Sugawara: Chief Administrative Division, Army Aeronautical Department
- Hajime Sugiyama: Chief, Administrative Division, Army Aeronautical Department
- Kumaichi Teramoto: Member, Administrative Division, Army Aeronautical Department
- Takeo Yasuda: Chief, Administrative Division, Army Aeronautical Department
- Koiso Kuniaki: Chief, Administrative Division, Army Aeronautical Department
- Tsuneori Kaya: Attached to Administration, Army Aeronautical Department, Ministry of War

Chief of the Army Aviation Headquarters

- Tomoyuki Yamashita: Chief of the Army Aviation Headquarters

Inspectorate General of Army Air Force

- Tomoyuki Yamashita: Inspector General of Army Aviation
- Prince Mikasa: Inspector General of Army Aviation
- Korechika Anami: Inspector General of Army Aviation
- Torashirō Kawabe: Deputy Chief, Inspectorate General of Air Force
- Hideki Tōjō: Inspector General of Army Aviation
- Kenji Doihara: Inspector General of Army Aviation

Air Armies General Commanders

- Masakazu Kawabe: Commanding General, Air General Army, (took charge of Army air operations in homeland, Chosen and Ryukyus)
- Takeo Yasuda: Commanding General, First Air Army
- Torashirō Kawabe: Commanding General, Second Air Army (Manchuria)
- Hideyoshi Obata: Third Air Army General Commander
- Michio Sugawara: Third Air Army Commander and Sixth Air Army Commander. Between March and May 1945, General Sugawara was engaged in the Ten-Go Air Operation, under the Commander-in-Chief, Combined Fleet
- Kumaichi Teramoto: Commanding General, Fourth Air Army
- Kyoji Tominaga: Fourth Air Army Commander
- Takuma Shimoyama: At end of World War II, he was Commanding General (LtGen), Fifth Air Army, stationed in Seoul, Chosen
- Prince Un Yi: General Officer Commanding First Air Army

Air Groups Commanders

- Michio Sugawara: First Air Group Commander
- Kumaichi Teramoto: Commanding General, Second Air Group (LtGen)
- Hideyoshi Obata: Fifth Air Group Commander and Third Air Group Commander

Air Regiment Commanders

- Michio Sugawara: LtCol (Air Force), Regimental Commander, 6th Air Regiment (Colonel)
- Rikishi Tsukada: LtCol/Colonel (Air Force) Officer attached to 7th Air Regiment; later 7th Air Regiment Commander
- Kumaichi Teramoto: Regimental Commander, 8th Air Regiment (Colonel, Air Force)
- Takuma Shimoyama: Regimental Commander, 16th Air Regiment
- Hideyoshi Obata: Regimental Commander, 16th Air Regiment
- Yoshitoshi Tokugawa: Commanding Officer 1st Air Regiment

Air Force Brigade Commanders

- Michio Sugawara: Brigade Commander, 2nd Air Brigade, Brigade Commander, 3rd Air Brigade

Air Force Staff Officers

- Prince Mikasa: Member of Staff of the Air General Army
- Rikishi Tsukada: Chief of Staff, First Air Group
- Takuma Shimoyama: Staff Officer, Air Force
- Michio Sugawara: Department (MajGen), Staff Officer, Air Force administration

Officer Attached to Second Air Group HQ

- Hideyoshi Obata: Colonel (Air Force) --attached to Second Air Group Headquarters

Commanding Officer in Air Battalion

- Yoshitoshi Tokugawa: Commanding Officer 2nd Air Battalion

Acting General Officer Commanding Army Aviation Corps

- Yoshitoshi Tokugawa: Acting General Officer Commanding Army Aviation Corps and General Officer Commanding Army Aviation Corps

Air Force Commanders, Directors and instructors in Air Schools

- Hideyoshi Obata: Commandant, Akeno Army Air School, Commanding General, same school (MajGen)
- Michio Sugawara: Commandant, Shimoshizu Army Air School and Commandant, Military Air Academy and Air Training Army Commander
- Kumaichi Teramoto: Director/Superintendent, Hamamatsu Army Air School (MajGen)
- Rikishi Tsukada: Instructor, Hamamatsu Army Air School
- Yoshitoshi Tokugawa: Commandant of Akeno Army Aviation School and Commandant of Tokorozawa Army Aviation School, Director of Training Department, Tokorozawa Army Aviation School, Commandant of Central Army Aviation School

Chief of Army Aeronautical Department (operative unit)

- Takuma Shimoyama: Chief, Army Aeronautical Department (MajGen)
- Himeji Sugiyama: Chief, Army Aeronautical Department
- Michio Sugawara: Chief, Army Aeronautical Department
- Kumaichi Teramoto: Chief, Army Aeronautical Department

Deputy Chief of Army Aeronautical Department

- Michio Sugawara: Deputy Chief of Army Aeronautical Department

Chief of Second Bureau, Army Aeronautical Department

- Takeo Yasuda: Chief, Second Bureau, Army Aeronautical Department

Chief of Army Air Technical Laboratories

- Takeo Yasuda: Chief, Army Air Technical Laboratories

Technicals and Experts in Army Aeronautical Sciences

- Michio Sugawara: Major (Air Force); Section Chief, Army Aeronautical Department
- Kumaichi Teramoto: LtCol (Air Force), Officer attached; later member of Army Aeronautical Department
- Takeo Yasuda: Officer attached to Army Air Technical Laboratories (MajGen)
- Yoshitoshi Tokugawa: Director of the Research Department, Tokorozawa Army Aviation School

Imperial Japanese Army Air Force units

64th Sentai units (Bangkok Airfield, 1941)

- Major/Lieutenant Colonel Tateo Katō: Group leader
- Captain Katsumi Anma: Group Leader
- Sergeant Shigeaku Wakayama
- Lieutenant Hiroshi Okuyama
- Lieutenant Tadashi Kataoka
- Captain Haruyasu Maruo
- Captain Yasuiko Kuroe
- Lieutenant Yohei Hinoki
- Lieutenant Takeshi Endo
- Sergeant Aikichi Misago
- Sergeant Yoshiko Yasuda
- Sergeant Chikara Goto
- Corporal Hirano

Kurai Chutai, 502nd Sentai unit (Nakatsu Airfield, 1945)

- Staff Sergeant Joten Naito

Hane Chutai, 2nd Air Army unit (Xinjing East Airfield, 1945)

- Captain Kamata

=== Kwantung Army Commanders (until 1945) ===
- Taka Hishikari: Commander in Chief Kwantung Army
- Nobuyushi Muto: Commander in Chief Kwantung Army
- Kenkichi Ueda: Commander of Kwantung Army
- Shigeru Honjō: Commander of Kwantung Army
- Yoshitake Muraoka: Commander of Kwantung Army
- Senjuro Hayashi: Commander of Kwantung Army, Prime Minister
- Yoshijirō Umezu: Commander of Kwantung Army, War Vice Minister
- Jirō Minami: Commander of Kwantung Army; concurrently Official Ambassador to Manchukuo
- Tomoyuki Yamashita: Commander of Kwantung Army
- Otozō Yamada: Commander of Kwantung Army
- Takuma Shimoyama: Kwantung Army Headquarters; Adviser, Manchukuoan Military Administration Bureau
- Shizuo Yokoyama: Commander of Railway Sector Headquarters, Kwantung Army
- Atazo Adachi: Commander, Kwantung Army Railroad Command

=== Kwantung Government-General Administration ===
- Sadao Araki: Officer (Major), Kwantung Government-General
- Koiso Kuniaki: Army Staff Officer, Kwantung Government-General
- Jun Ushiroku: Officer, assigned to Kwantung Government-General
- Saburo Ando: Commandant of Port Arthur
- H.Ukita: Commander of Ryojun Naval Guard District and Station

For a complete structure see:

- Organization of the Kwantung Army of Japan

=== Structures in other Japanese armies ===
See:

- Structure of the Taiwan Army of Japan
- Organization of the Imperial Japanese Army, Hokkai (North) region
- Organization of the China Garrison detachment of the Imperial Japanese Army (to 1937)
- Structure of the Japanese Army in Mengjiang
- Organization of Japanese Expeditionary forces in China
- Organization of Japanese forces in Southeast Asia
- Organization of the Imperial Japanese Navy Alaskan Strike Group
- Structure of the Imperial Japanese forces in the South Seas Mandate
- Organization of Japanese defensive units in Okinawa

== Police ==
=== Commander in Chief of Kempeitai units ===
- Kesago Nakajima: Since 1921–41 lead the Kempeitai operation inside Japan and Asia during wartimes
- Kenzo Kitano: Military Police (Gendarmerie) Commander, China Forces
- Hideki Tōjō: Commanding General, Military Police, Kwantung Army
- Sanji Okido: Commander, Military Police
- Takeshi Mori: Deputy Chief, Military Police Headquarters
- Shizuichi Tanaka: Chief, General Affairs Bureau; Military Police Forces Headquarters; Commander, Kwantung Army Military Police Units; Commander, Military Police Forces (LtGen)
- Keisuke Fujie: Chief, General Affairs Bureau, Military Police; Headquarters, Kwantung Army; Commander, Kwantung Army Military Police
- Moto Inkai: General Officer Commanding Kempeitai unit, Chosen
- Rokuro Iwasa: Commander in Chief Kempeitai Forces, Tokyo Hq
- Tuyoji Hirano: Commanding Officer Kempeitai Section 25th Army, Sumatra

=== Tokeitai police service units ===
- Isoge Taro:- Operative leader of Joho Kyoko (Japanese naval intelligence) and Tokeitai (naval military police)

=== Imperial Guards unit ===
- Sadao Araki: Company Commander, 1st Infantry Regiment, Imperial Guard Division, during Russo-Japanese War
- Jinsaburo Mazaki: Regimental Commander, 1st Infantry, Imperial Guard Division
- Makino Shiro: Battalion Commander, 4th Imperial Guard Infantry Regiment
- Shōjirō Iida: Regimental Commander, 4th Infantry, Imperial Guard Division, General Officer Commanding 2nd Imperial Guards Division
- Hisaichi Terauchi: Regimental Commander, 3rd Imperial Guards (Colonel); Chief of Staff, Imperial Guard Regiment; Chief of Staff, Imperial Guard Division
- Korechika Anami: Regimental Commander, 2nd Imperial Guards unit
- Fusataro Teshima: Imperial Guard Division Commander
- Kioji Tominaga: Infantry Regiment Commander, 2nd Imperial Guards
- Akira Mutō: Imperial Guard Division Commander; 2nd Imperial Guard Division Commander
- Nobuyoshi Obata: Commanding Officer, Transportation Regiment, Imperial Guard Division
- Tadasu Kataoka: Commander, Imperial Guard Cavalry Regiment; Commander, Imperial Guard Reconnaissance Regiment
- Tadamichi Kuribayashi: Commanding General, 2nd Imperial Guard Depot Division (LtGen)
- Takeshi Mori: Commanding General, 1st Imperial Guard Division, killed during abortive coup d'état launched against him at Imperial Palace
- Major-General Imaye Chief of Staff 2nd Imperial Guards Division, Malaya
- Hideo Iwakuro: Commanding Officer 5th Imperial Guards Regiment, Malaya
- Chikara Hiraoka: Chief Military Affairs Department 1st Imperial Guards Division
- Yaezo Akashiba: General Officer Commanding 1st Imperial Guards Division, Tokyo
- Prince Asaka Yasuhiko: General Officer Commanding 1st Imperial Guards Division
- Susumu Harada: Commanding Officer 3rd Imperial Guards Brigade
- Teiko Itada: General Officer Commanding Imperial Guards Division, China
- Prince Un Yi: Commanding Officer 2nd Imperial Guards Brigade
- Machijiri Kazumoto: Commanding Officer Imperial Guards Artillery Regiment
- Tsuneori Kaya: General Officer Commanding 2nd Imperial Guards Depot Division
- Prince Kan'in Kotohito: General Officer Commanding Imperial Guards Division
- Kazuo Mizutani: Chief of Staff, First Imperial Guards Division in Eastern District Army

=== Commander of Keishicho Civil Police forces ===
- Juzo Nishio: Governor of the Tokyo metropolitan area
- Kōichi Kido: Home Affairs Minister
- Hideki Tōjō: Home Affairs Minister
- Hiranuma Kiichirō: Home Affairs Minister
- Saburo Ando : Home Affairs Minister
- Tsuneo Matsudaira : Home Affairs Minister
- Akira Kazami: Justice Ministry
- Heisuke Yanagawa: Justice Ministry
- Hiranuma Kiichirō: Justice Minister

=== Operative Chief of Keishicho Civil Police units ===
- Tsukio Tomioka: Operative Keishicho Police Chief in Tokio metropolitan area
- Sergeant Kiyokawa: Keishicho Officer Police

=== Tokko police service unit ===
- Kesago Nakajima: Since 1921–41 lead the State Police (Tokko) operations inside Japan and Asia during wartimes
- Officer Maruyama: underground unit, in Censorship department in Tokko Intelligence service, in Tokyo, Japan

== Marine Ministries ==
=== War Relief Association ===
- Mitsumasa Yonai: adviser to War Relief Association

=== Marine Ministers ===
- Shigetarō Shimada: Ministry of the Navy of Japan; Commandant in Kure and Yokosuka Naval Districts; Commander, China Navy Area Fleet; Chief of Naval General Staff
- Teijirō Toyoda: Marine Minister
- Takasumi Oka: Marine minister
- Mineo Ōsumi: Marine Minister
- Koshiró Oikawa: Marine Minister
- Naokuni Nomura: Marine Minister
- Mitsumasa Yonai: Marine Minister; Commander-in-Chief, First Expeditionary Fleet (Yangtze River); Commander Yokosuka and Sasebo Naval District; Commander-in-Chief, Combined Fleet; Imperial and Supreme War Councilor; Ex-Prime Minister and political adviser

=== Vice-Marine Ministers ===
- Kantarō Suzuki: Vice-Minister of Navy
- Shigeyoshi Inoue: Vice-Minister of Navy

=== Private Secretary to the Minister of the Navy ===
- Sokichi Takagi: Private Secretary to the Minister of the Navy

=== Navy Admirals of the Fleet ===
- Prince Fushimi Hiroyasu
- Isoroku Yamamoto
- Osami Nagano
- Mineichi Koga

=== Navy Admirals ===
- Isoroku Yamamoto
- Koshiro Oikawa
- Soemu Toyoda
- Teijirō Toyoda
- Mitsumasa Yonai
- Saito Makoto
- Kantarō Suzuki
- Chuichi Nagumo
- Shigetarō Shimada
- Hiroaki Abe

=== Navy Staff College's Research Department ===
- Sokichi Takagi: Member in Navy Staff College's Research Department

=== Third Department in Marine Ministry ===
- Shigetarō Shimada: Chief of Third Department in Marine Ministry

=== Bureau of Naval Affairs ===
- Nobuzo Tohmatsu: Chief of Naval Affairs

=== Bureau of Naval Supply ===
- Nobuzo Tohmatsu: Chief of Bureau of Naval Supply

=== Bureau of Naval Accounting ===
- Nobuzo Tohmatsu: Chief of Bureau of Naval Accounting

=== Naval Aviation Bureau ===
- Eikitchi Katagiri: Chief of Naval Aviation Bureau
- Kazume Kinsei: Officer of Naval Aviation Bureau. Created some plans for bombing strikes against territory of the United States

Imperial Japanese Navy Air Force units

Fighter Unit (Carrier Akagi, 1941)

- Lieutenant Commander Shigeru Itaya

Tainan Air Corps (Denpasar Airfield, 1942)

- 1st Class Petty Officer Saburō Sakai

Yokosuka Air Corps (Yokosuka Airfield, 1943)

- Warrant Officer/Instructor Hiroyoshi Nishizawa

253rd Air Corps (Rabaul Airfield, 1944)

- Warrant Officer Tetsuzō Iwamoto

303 Squadron, 203rd Air Corps (Kagoshima Airfield, 1945)

- Captain-Petty Officer Tanimizu

=== Navy General Staff's Intelligence Division ===
- Mineichi Koga: Chief of the Navy General Staff's Intelligence Division

Japanese Navy Secret Service units

- Isoge Taro:- Operative leader of Joho Kyoko (Japanese naval intelligence) and Tokeitai (naval military police)
- Captain Onoda: Navy figure, in the Second Bureau (Intelligence Division), Japanese Army
- Kanyei Chuyo: Commander in Japanese Navy Secret services. Directed the 8th Section "Yashika". Between this unit stay the "Tokyo Gimusho" office (the "Australian Section") linked with Japanese Naval Intelligence Staff under command of Imperial Navy General Staff. The office had orders to researching any affairs of the British Empire in Southeast Asia and Pacific Area.

=== Japanese Imperial Navy's Advisory Bureau on Jewish Affairs ===
- Inuzuka Koreshige: member of Japanese Imperial Navy's Advisory Bureau on Jewish Affairs

=== Operation Section of Naval General Staff ===
- Shigeru Fukudome: Chief, of Operation Section of Naval General Staff

=== Plans Division Office of Operation Section in Naval General Staff ===
- Sadatoshi Tomioka: Chief in Plans Division Office of Operation Section in Naval General Staff;he was proposer and support plans for Australian Invasion.

=== Naval Research Section ===
- Sokichi Takagi: Chief of Naval Research Section

=== Technical Council in Navy Technical Department ===
- Mitsumasa Yonai: Member, Technical Council, Navy Technical Department, Yokosuka Naval Station

=== Naval Aviation Development Division in Munitions Ministry ===
- Takijiro Ohnishi: Chief of the Naval Aviation Development Division in the Munitions Ministry; was the Japanese Navy figure in same ministry

=== President of Japanese Naval Staff College ===
- Nobutake Kondō: President of the Japanese Naval Staff College

=== Navy Officers in Reserve list ===
- Mitsumasa Yonai: Navy officer placed on reserve list
- Shigetarō Shimada: retired to Reserve, January 1945 (at own request);

== Navy ==
=== Chief of Naval General Staff ===
- Nobutake Kondō: Chief of Naval General Staff
- Prince Fushimi Hiroyasu: Chief of Naval General Staff
- Abo Kiyokazu: Chief of Naval General Staff
- Shigetarō Shimada: Chief of Naval General Staff
- Osami Nagano: Chief of Naval General Staff
- Jisaburō Ozawa: Chief of Naval General Staff
- Kantarō Suzuki: Chief of Naval General Staff
- Mineichi Koga: Chief of Naval General Staff

=== Staff Officer of Naval General Staff ===
- Shigetarō Shimada: Staff Officer of Naval General Staff
- Prince Kuni Asaakira: Staff Officer of Naval General Staff

=== Vice-Chief of Naval General Staff ===
- Shigetarō Shimada: Vice-Chief, Naval General Staff
- Seiichi Itō: Vice-Chief of Naval Staff
- Shigeru Fukudome: Vice-Chief of Naval Staff
- Mineichi Koga: Vice-Chief of the Naval General Staff

=== Naval General Staff ===
- Tamon Yamaguchi: Member, Naval General Staff
- Shigetarō Shimada: Member, Naval General Staff
- Kantarō Suzuki: Member, Naval General Staff
- Mitsumasa Yonai: Member, Naval General Staff
- Prince Nobuhito: Officer attached to Naval General Staff

=== Commander-in-Chief of Combined Fleet ===
- Kantarō Suzuki: Commander-in-Chief of Combined Fleet,
- Mitsumasa Yonai: Commander-in-Chief, Combined Fleet and, concurrently, First Fleet
- Shigetarō Shimada: Chief of Staff 1st Fleet—Chief of Staff, Combined Fleet
- Isoroku Yamamoto: Commander-in-Chief of the Combined Fleet
- Mineichi Koga: Commander-in-Chief of the Combined Fleet
- Soemu Toyoda: Commander-in-Chief of the Combined Fleet
- Jisaburō Ozawa: Commander-in-Chief of the Combined Fleet

=== Vice-Commander of Combined Fleet ===
- Matome Ugaki: Vice-Commander of the Combined Fleet

=== Chief of Staff of Combined Fleet ===
- Shigetarō Shimada: Chief of Staff of the Combined Fleet
- Ryunosuke Kusaka: Chief of Staff of the Combined Fleet
- Nobutake Kondō: Chief of Staff of the Combined Fleet

=== Commander of First Naval Fleet ===
- Mitsumasa Yonai: Commander of First Naval Fleet
- Chuichi Nagumo: Commander of First Naval Fleet
- Isoroku Yamamoto: Commander of First Naval Fleet

=== Commander of 2nd Naval Fleet ===
- Mitsumasa Yonai: Commander of 2nd Naval Fleet
- Nobutake Kondō: Commander of 2nd Naval Fleet
- Mineichi Koga: Commander of 2nd Naval Fleet

=== Commander of 3rd Naval Fleet ===
- Mitsumasa Yonai: Commander of 3rd Naval Fleet

=== First Naval Air Fleet ===
- Chuichi Nagumo: Commander of the First Naval Air Fleet
- Kiyohide Shima: Commander of the First Naval Air Fleet
- Kinpei Teraoka: Commander of the First Naval Air Fleet
- Takijiro Ohnishi: Commander of the First Naval Air Fleet

=== Senior Staff Officer of the First Naval Air Fleet ===
- Tamotsu Oishi: Senior Staff Officer of the First Naval Air Fleet

=== Second Navy Air Fleet ===
- Shigeru Fukudome: Commander of the Second Navy Air Fleet

=== Fifth Navy Air Fleet ===
- Matome Ugaki: Commander of the Fifth Navy Air Fleet

=== 11th Navy Air Fleet ===
- Nishizō Tsukahara: Commander of the 11th Navy Air Fleet
- Jinichi Kusaka: Commander of 11th Navy Air Fleet

=== 26th Air Flotilla ===
- Masafumi Arima: Commander of the 26th Air Flotilla

=== Fourth Naval Fleet ===
- Shigeyoshi Inouye: Commander of Fourth Navy Fleet

=== Eighth Naval Fleet ===
- Gunichi Mikawa: Commander of Eighth Naval Fleet
- Sentaro Omori: Commander of Eighth Naval Fleet

=== Third Destroyer Flotilla ===
- Matsuji Ijuin: Commander of Third Destroyer Flotilla

=== China Navy Area Fleet ===
- Shigetarō Shimada: Commander, China Area Fleet

=== 1st Carrier Division ===
- Chuichi Nagumo: Commander of 1st CarDiv
- Tamotsu Oishi: Senior staff officer in the 1st Carrier Division

=== Carrier Division Three ===
- Sueo Obayashi: Commander of CarDiv Three
- Tamon Yamaguchi: Commander of 3rd CarDiv

=== 1st CarDiv ===
- Chuichi Hara: Commander of 1st CarDiv
- Tamon Yamaguchi: Commander of 1st CarDiv

=== 2nd Carrier Unit ===
- Kakuji Kakuta: Commander of 2nd Carrier Unit

=== 3rd Destroyer Flotilla ===
- Shintaro Hashimoto: Commander of 3rd Destroyer Flotilla
- Matsuji Ijuin: Commander of 3rd Destroyer Flotilla

=== 2nd Destroyer Group ===
- Tameichi Hara: Commander of 2nd Destroyer Group

=== 10th Destroyer Flotilla ===
- Susumu Kimura: Commander of 10th Destroyer Flotilla

=== 10th Destroyer Unit ===
- Susumu Kimura: Commander of 10th Destroyer Unit

=== 22nd Destroyer Division ===
- Rear Admiral Shima: Commander of 22nd Destroyer Division

=== 6th Destroyer Flotilla ===
- Sadamichi Kajioka: Commander of 6th Destroyer Flotilla

=== 2nd Destroyer Unit ===
- Raizo Tanaka: Commander of 2nd Destroyer Unit "Tokyo Express"

=== 3rd Destroyer Flotilla ===
- Shintaro Hashimoto: Commander of 3rd Destroyer Flotilla

=== 4th Destroyer Division ===
- Kosaku Aruga: Commander of 4th Destroyer Division

=== 4th Destroyer Flotilla ===
- Tamotsu Takama: Commander of 4th Destroyer Flotilla

=== 5th Cruiser Division ===
- Takeo Takagi: Commander of 5th Cruiser Division
- Aritomo Goto: Commander of 5th Cruiser Division

=== 18th Cruiser Division ===
- Rear Admiral Marumo: Commander of 18th Cruiser Division

=== 8th Cruiser Division ===
- Hiroaki Abe: Commander of 8th Cruiser Division
- Tadaichi Hara: Commander of 8th Cruiser Division

=== 6th Cruiser Division ===
- Aritomo Goto: Commander of 6th Cruiser Division

=== 4th Cruiser Division (1st section) ===
- Nobutake Kondō: Commander of 4th Cruiser Division

=== 5th Cruiser Division ===
- Takeo Takagi: Commander of 5th Cruiser Division
- Sentaro Omori: Commander of 5th Cruiser Division

=== 7th Cruiser Division ===
- Takeo Kurita: Commander of 7th Cruiser Division
- Shoji Nishimura: Commander of 7th Cruiser Division

=== 1st Battleship Division ===
- Isoroku Yamamoto: Commander of 1st Battleship Division

=== 3rd Battleship Division (1st section) ===
- Gunichi Mikawa: Commander of 3rd Battleship Division

=== 3rd Submarine Sqdn ===
- Teruhisa Komatsu: Commander of 3rd Submarine Sqdn

=== 5th Submarine Sqdn ===
- Daigo Tadashige: Commander of 5th Submarine Sqdn

=== 13th Submarine Sqdn ===
- Takeharu Miyazaki: Commander of 13th Submarine Sqdn

=== First Submarine Fleet ===
- Tatsunosuke Ariizumi: Commander of First Submarine Fleet

=== Sixth Submarine Fleet ===
- Daigo Tadashige: Commander of Sixth Submarine Fleet

=== 1st Transport Group ===
- Kunizo Kanaoka: Commander of 1st Transport Group

=== 2nd Transport Group ===
- Shigoroku Nakayama: Commander of 2nd Transport Group

=== 3rd Transport Group ===
- Raizo Tanaka: Commander of 3rd Transport Group

=== Seaplane Tender Group ===
- Riutaro Fujita: Commander of Seaplane Tender Group

=== Minesweeper Group ===
- Sadatomo Miyamoto: Commander of Minesweeper Group

=== First Naval Striking Force ===
- Takeo Kurita: Commander of First Naval Striking Force (Battle of Leyte Gulf, Philippines Campaign)

=== Officer in Japanese Vessel Raiders Force(1941–1942) ===
- Tamotsu Oishi: He assigned the lead of Aikoku Maru, unit in Japanese Vessel Raiders Force during the Navy Raiding campaign in the Indian Seas area.
- See List of Japanese Auxiliary Cruiser Commerce Raiders

=== Sasebo 7th Special Naval Landing Force ===
- Takeo Sugai: Commander of Sasebo 7th Special Naval Landing Force

=== Chief of Staff of the Maizuru Naval Base ===
- Sokichi Takagi: chief of staff of the Maizuru Naval Base
- Kiyohide Shima: chief of Staff of the Maizuru Naval District

=== First Naval District ===
- Michitaro Tozuka: Commander of the First Naval District

=== Kure and Yokosuka Naval Districts ===
- Shigetarō Shimada: Commandant, Yokosuka and Kure Naval Districts
- Mitsumasa Yonai: commanded Yokosuka Naval District

=== Sasebo Naval District ===
- Mitsumasa Yonai: commanded Sasebo Naval District

=== Sasebo Naval Yard ===
- Nobuzo Tohmatsu: commanded Sasebo Naval Yard

=== Yokosuka Naval Base ===
- Soemu Toyoda: Commander of the Yokosuka Naval Base

=== Kure Naval Base ===
- Ibō Takahashi: Commander of the Kure Naval Base

=== Chinkai Naval Station (Chosen) ===
- Mitsumasa Yonai: Vice-Admiral, commanded Chinkai Naval Station (Chosen)

=== Ryojun Naval Station (Kwantung) ===
- H.Ukita: Vice-Admiral, commanded Ryojun Naval Station (Kwantung)

== Central Government Ministries ==
=== Kodoha ideological advisers in government ===
- Sadao Araki
- Hideki Tōjō
- Koiso Kuniaki
- Jinsaburo Mazaki
- Heisuke Yanagawa
- Hideyoshi Obata
- Kazushige Ugaki
- Hajime Sugiyama
- Yoshijirō Umezu
- Tetsuzan Nagata

=== Chief of Cabinet Secretary ===
- Naoki Hoshino: Chief of Cabinet Secretary

=== Welfare Minister;) ===
- Kōichi Kido: Education, Welfare and Home Minister, as well as chief secretary to the Naidaijin and last proper Naidaijin (Lord Keeper of the Privy Seal). He is recognised as one of the principal supporters of General Tojo's policies. During his period as Home Affairs Minister, he commanded the Keishicho (Tokyo Metropolitan Police Department), and national civil police forces.

=== Minister of Education ===
- Sadao Araki: charge of Minister of Education; Company Commander, 1st Infantry Regiment, Imperial Guard Division, during the Russo-Japanese War; principal nationalist thinker and right-wing political adviser in the country; War minister; founder of Kokuhonsha (Society for the Foundation of the State) right-wing secret society
- Hideki Tōjō: Minister of Education
- Kōichi Kido: concurrently Minister of Education

=== Imperial Youth Federation/Imperial Youth Corps ===
- Kingoro Hashimoto: Imperial Youth Federation and Imperial Youth Corps Chief; in charge of young nationalist and militarists local indoctrination, following official doctrines amongst Minister of Education policies.

=== Minister of State Affairs ===
- Heisuke Yanagawa: Minister of State Affairs

=== Finance Minister ===
- Okinori Kaya: Finance Minister, also opium dealer to the Chinese and government supporter
- Kazuo Aoki: Finance Minister
- Ikeda Shigeaki Minister of Finance.
- Masatsune Ogura: Finance Minister (with Sumitomo Clan Links)
- Seihin Ikeda: Ex-Finance Minister, also political adviser (other figure of Zaibatsu groups in government)

=== Government Finances and Economics Entities ===
'National Economic policies'

- Naoki Hoshino: Political Adviser charged with composing new economic policies, and Chief of Economic Project Department and Chief of Cabinet Secretary

'Planning Bureau in Cabinet Resources Board'

- Isamu Yokoyama: Chief of Planning Bureau in Cabinet Resources Board

'Member in Cabinet Research Board'

- Teiichi Suzuki: concurrently Member, Cabinet Research Board,

'Imperial Planning Institute'

- Takazo Numata: Head of 1st Department, Planning Institute

'1st Department, Planning Institute (Cabinet Research Board Unit)'

- Takazo Numata:Chief of 1st Department, Planning Institute Unit, inside of Cabinet Research Board

'Cabinet Planning Board'

- Sumihisa Ikeda: President of Cabinet Planning Board
- Kenryo Sato: President of Central Government Cabinet Planning Board for sometimes
- Teiichi Suzuki: President of the Cabinet Planning Board, Minister of State (Without Portfolio); also providing guidance for Wang Jingwei's new regime at Nanjing, also Imperial nominee to the House of Peers

'First Bureau, Cabinet Planning Board'

- Isamu Yokoyama: Chief of First Bureau, Cabinet Planning Board

'General Affairs Bureau, Cabinet Planning Board'

- Isamu Yokoyama: Chief of General Affairs Bureau, Cabinet Planning Board

'Secretary-General of the Asia Development Board'

- Teiichi Suzuki: Secretary-General of the Asia Development Board

'Political Affairs Section of the Asia Development Board'

- Teiichi Suzuki: first Chief of the Political Affairs Section of the Asia Development Board (China Affairs Board)
- Heisuke Yanagawa: Chief of Political Affairs Section of the Asia Development Board

=== Commerce and Industry Minister ===
- Ichizō Kobayashi: Commerce and Industry Ministry (also chairman of Tokyo Gasu Denky); ardent follower of Hitler´s doctrines
- Seizo Sakonji: Commerce and Industry Minister (Army figure in government)
- Teijirō Toyoda: Commerce and Industry, Foreign Affairs Minister and Marine Minister, (with Mitsui Clan connection)
- Hideki Tōjō: Minister of Commerce and Industry
- Ikeda Shigeaki: Minister of Commerce and Industry
- Nobusuke Kishi: Minister of Commerce and Industry

=== Government Industry, Commerce and Trading Organizations ===
'Nan-yo Kyokai'

- Fujiyama Raita: Vice-president of "Nan-yo Kyokai" (South Seas Society), as government-Navy Trade Agency in South Seas Mandate

'Nanyo Sangyo Kaisha'

- Masaichi Hanaoka Directing Manager of Nanyo Sangyo Kaisha in Tokyo, Japan

'Nanyo Kohatsu Kaisha'

- Haruji Matsue Directing-Manager of Nanyo Kohatsu Kabushiki Kaisha (South Seas Developing Company)

=== Minister of Trade ===
- Hideki Tōjō: Minister of Trade

=== Minister of State (without portfolio) ===
- Teiichi Suzuki: Minister of State (Without portfolio) in central government
- Kasiburo Ando: Minister of State without Portfolio
- Hiranuma Kiichirō: Minister of State without Portfolio
- Toji Yasui: Minister of State without Portfolio

=== Minister of Agriculture ===
- Yoriyasu Arima: Leader in Imperial Farmers Association, political adviser, later Minister of Agriculture

=== Communications Minister ===
- Shōzō Murata: Communications Minister (president of Osaka Shosen Kaisha Company, insider of Sumitomo Clan)
- Nobofumi Ito: Chief of Information Department
- Koh Ishii: Ex servant in Foreign Affairs Ministry; was Official Government spokesman

'Official Journalists'

- Teiichi Muto: Official Journalist in Asahi Shimbun and Japan Times and Advertiser
- Shiro Mashida: Official journalist in Asahi Shimbun
- Masanori Ito: Official Journalist and Director in Japan Times and Mail
- Akinaru Jisawa: Official journalist in Chungai Shogyo

'Support writers and military experts'

- Yasuo Mishina: Military strategist
- Tadashi Saito: Army expert
- Otsughi Narita: Military thinker
- Kinoaki Matsuo: Navy Theoretician

'Official war correspondent'

- Eiji Suzuki: a war correspondent for Yomiuri Shimbun in wartimes

=== President of International Cultural Relations Society ===
- Aisuke Kabayama: President of International Cultural relations Society

=== Justice Minister ===
- Akira Kazami: Justice Minister, Fumimaro Konoye partner, led the Keishicho (Tokyo Metropolitan Police Department)
- Heisuke Yanagawa: Justice Minister; commander of the Keishicho (Tokyo Metropolitan Police Department), and leader in Taisei Yokusankai (Imperial Rule Assistance Association) group
- Hiranuma Kiichirō: Minister of Justice for sometimes

=== Home Affairs Minister ===
- Takejiro Tokonami: Home Affairs Minister; founder of Kokusui-kai, a yakuza organization.
- Kiichiro Hiranuma: Prime Minister, with Japanese Navy support; also Home Affairs Minister; also chief of the Keishicho (Tokyo Metropolitan Police Department), also founder and leader in the "Shintoist Rites Research Council" organization
- Saburo Ando: Home Affairs Minister
- Hideki Tōjō: Home Affairs Minister
- Kōichi Kido: Home Affairs Minister
- Tsuneo Matsudaira: Home Affairs Minister

=== Diet members ===
- Kishi Nobusuke: was a Diet member who co-signed the declaration of war against the United States
- Chikao Fujisawa: Member of Diet (Parliament), supporter of State Shinto
- Kingoro Hashimoto: Right-wing ideologist, also Imperial Youth Federation and Imperial Youth Corps leader; in charge of young nationalist and militarists local indoctrination, member of House of Representatives of Japan and vice-president of Diet; instigator of the Second Sino-Japanese War.

== Foreign Affairs ==
=== Foreign Affairs Minister ===
- Nobuyuki Abe: Foreign Affair Minister
- Kijuro Shidehara Foreign Affairs Minister
- Hideki Tōjō: concurrently Minister of Foreign Affairs
- Aoki Shūzō: Foreign Minister
- Shigemitsu Mamoru: Foreign Minister
- Teijirō Toyoda: Foreign Minister
- Kenkichi Yoshizawa: Minister of Foreign Affairs
- Yosuke Matsuoka: Foreign Affairs Minister
- Hachiro Arita: Foreign Affairs Minister, believer in the Axis powers alliance
- Shigenori Tōgō: Foreign Affairs Minister
- Kichisaburō Nomura: Foreign Affairs Minister, also Japanese Ambassador in United States

=== Foreign Affairs Officers ===
- Kanji Kato: High-ranking official in Foreign Affairs Ministry
- Kaoru Muramatsu: Official of the Research Section of Ministry of Foreign Affairs
- Kinoaki Matsuo: Foreign Affairs officer, also intelligence unit when serving as liaison between the Japanese Foreign Office and the Admiralty; a Black Dragon Society member
- Mr.Yosano: Foreign Office high-ranking official;as liaison in IGHQ-Army/Navy Intelligence section.
- Tomohiko Ushiba: Foreign Office high-ranking official
- Toshikazu Kase: Foreign Ministry high-ranking official
- Ishiguro Shiro: Foreign Ministry high-ranking official, and Civil Government expert in Jews Affairs in wartimes

=== Foreign Affairs Officers on Diplomatic Missions ===
- Ichizō Kobayashi: Industrialist and Government supporter in Diplomatic Mission to Ducht Indies (1940)
- Yatsuji Nagai: Army attaché and Diplomatic in Matsuoka's mission to Europe and Russia
- Hideo Iwakuro: Army attaché and Foreign Affairs officer, provided diplomatic support to the Washington mission
- Kaname Wakasugi: special aide to Nomura Mission to Washington
- Saburō Kurusu: special ambassador in diplomatic mission to Washington

=== Overseas ambassadors ===
- Nobuyuki Abe: Ambassador to Nanjing-China
- Kichisaburō Nomura: Foreign Affairs Minister, also Japanese Ambassador in United States
- Toshio Shiratoru: Foreign Affairs Minister; Japanese Ambassador to Italy, diplomatic advisor and firm supporter of the Axis Powers alliance
- Shigeru Yoshida: Japanese ambassador in Italy and England
- Hiroshi Ōshima: Japanese Ambassador to Germany, also right-wing follower and military attaché working for alliance between Japan and Nazi Germany (Anti-Comintern Pact, 1937; Tripartite Alliance, 1940)
- Renzo Sawada: Japanese Ambassador in France for some time
- Naotake Satō: wartime Japanese Ambassador to the Soviet Union
- Kenkichi Yoshizawa: Official Japanese Ambassador in Beiping (until 1937) and French Indochina in 1940–1941
- Yakichiro Suma: Japan's Ambassador in Spain
- Morito Morishima: Japanese Ambassador in Portugal
- Mamoru Shinozaki: Diplomat Officer, Japanese Embassy in British Malaya
- Jirō Minami: Kwantung Army - concurrently Ambassador to Manchukuo
- Taka Hishikari: Kwantung Army - Ambassador to Manchukuo
- Kumataro Honda: Japanese Ambassador in Nanjing during Wang Jingwei administration
- Ryonosuke Seita: Japanese Diplomatic Officer in Brisbane, Australia
- Gen Debuchi Special Envoy to diplomatic mission to Australia

=== Military attachés in foreign service ===
See: Japanese military attachés in foreign service

=== Japanese Overseas Consuls-General ===
- Mr.Loxton was European Honorary-Consul at Japanese service in Brisbane
- Kojiro Inoue Japanese Consul-General in Sydney
- Matatoshi Saito: Japanese Consul-General in Batavia (before 1941)
- Yutaka Ishizawa: Japanese Consul-General in Batavia
- Mr.Kita: Japanese Consul-General in Honolulu
- Chiune Sugihara: Japanese Consul-General in Kovno, Lithuania

=== Japanese Overseas Affairs Minister ===
- Koiso Kuniaki: Ministry of Greater East Asia (Japan)
- Kazuo Aoki: Ministry of Greater East Asia (Japan)
- Shigenori Tōgō: Minister for Colonization, later the Ministry of Greater East Asia (Japan)

=== Political Affairs Section of the Asia Development Board ===
- Teiichi Suzuki: Chief of the Political Affairs Section of the Asia Development Board (China Affairs Board), Secretary-General of the Asia Development Board

=== Governor-General in Exterior Provinces (1944–1945) ===
- Nobuyuki Abe: Governor-General of Chosen (Korea)
- Otozō Yamada: Governor-General of Kwantung Leased Territory
- Toshio Otsu: Governor-General of Karafuto (Sakhalin)
- Rikichi Andō: Governor-General of Taiwan (Formosa)
- Boshirō Hosogaya: Governor-General of South Seas Mandate (Micronesia)

=== Tibetan Department (1942) ===
Japanese and foreign politician and military experts related to Buddhist and Tibetan topics group inside of foreign affairs ministry during 1942, for research the possibility of any operations or incursion in Tibet:

- Aoki Bunkyo
- Lt.col Ishiwara Kanji
- Lt.Nomoto Jinzo
- Goshima Tokujiro
- Yamaji Yasujiro
- Tsarong Shape
- Regent Reting
- Anchin Hultukhu
- Dilowa Hutukhu

== Japanese experts in Jewish Affairs (1938–1942) ==
=== Military and Civil experts (Jewish & Manchurian Think Tank Groups) ===
- Captain Inuzuka Koreshige: Japanese Imperial Navy's Advisory Bureau on Jewish Affairs from March 1939 until April 1942.
- Colonel Yasue Norihiro: Army expert in Jewish topics and anti-Semitic ideology, believing strongly in the Protocols of the Elders of Zion.
- Ishiguro Shiro: Foreign Ministry high-ranking official
- Setsuzo Kotsuji:Government Officer, the only Japanese in the world at the time to speak and read Hebrew.
- Lieutenant-Colonel Ishiwara Kanji
- Colonel Seishirō Itagaki
- Industrialist Yoshisuke Aikawa
- Japanese Consul in Kovno, Lithuania, Chiune Sugihara
- General Kiichiro Higuchi: Japanese Army contact with Manchu Jew anticommunist movement and its supporter.

=== East Jew leader and Japanese supporter in Manchukuo ===
- Abraham Kaufman: Manchu Jew leader, founder of Far Eastern Jewish Council and Betarim Jew Zionists Movement.

=== 1938 Five Minister Conference ===
At the 1938 Five Ministers' Conference, five of the most powerful men in Japan gathered to discuss the ideas and plans of their 'Jewish experts'.

- Prime Minister Prince Fumimaro Konoye
- Foreign Minister Hachirō Arita
- Army Minister Seishirō Itagaki
- Naval Minister Yonai Mitsumasa
- Minister of Finance, Commerce, and Industry Ikeda Shigeaki

=== German Liaison in Jewish topics (until 1942) ===
- Colonel Josef Meisinger: chief of the Gestapo, was the Nazi liaison with Japanese military and government on the Jewish question.
- Dr. Franz Joseph Spahn: leader-designee and political adviser of the NSDAP (Nazi) party in Japan in that period.

== Government Supporters ==
=== Other close military government collaborators ===
- Hiroshi Akita
- Seizo Arisue
- Isamu Chō
- Gun Hashimoto
- Saburo Hayashi
- Masao Inaba
- Seijun Inada
- Akiho Ishii
- Susumu Nishiura
- Tokutaro Sakurai
- Kōtoku Satō
- Mitsuru Ushijima
- Masao Watanabe
- Hiromichi Yahara
- Yasuyo Yamazaki

=== Ultra-nationalist supporters close to the government ===
- Prince Kan'in Kotohito: ultra-nationalist and State Shinto supporter; later he was sent to Southeast Asia, in order to convey the Imperial message concerning the cessation of hostilities.
- Prince Asaka Yasuhiko: Right-wing partisan, also involved in the Nanjing Massacre, with Tenno direct orders to supervise operations along General Kesago Nakajima, one of Operative Commanders in area; later returned to China in order to convey the Imperial Message concerning the cessation of hostilities.
- Prince Takeda Tsuneyoshi: Nationalist follower; possibly was chief of Japanese Secret Services in Manchukuo, coordinated military and civil actions. Had a direct link with Imperial Family. Later sent to Manchukuo, with orders to convey the Imperial Message concerning the cessation of hostilities, but decided instead to take action against Soviet forces in the area.
- Prince Fushimi Hiroyasu: Right-winger, representative of the Emperor at High Command Conferences, also Chief of Naval General Staff of the Imperial Navy forces
- Yoshio Kodama: Right-wing industrialist, yakuza chief and honorary Rear Admiral, supporter of right-wing government policies
- Ryoichi Sasakawa: Another right-wing follower, and fascist thinker
- Nobuyuki Abe: Ex-Prime Minister, Governor-General of Chosen and political advisor
- Mitsuru Toyama: Founder of right-wing publishing firm Genyōsha and lator Black Dragon Society, also political advisor of Greater Japan Patriotic Society, yakuza organization.
- Tokutaro Kimura: Ex-Chief of Greater Japan Martial Virtue Society, kendo section, also ex-Chief of Imperial Japan Bar Association.

=== Nobility members, entrepreneurs and other supporters of Government and military establishment ===
==== Nobility members ====
- Count Kabayama Aisuke
- Count Hisaichi Terauchi
- Count Hiranuma Kiichirō
- Count Yoriyasu Arima
- Viscount Kazumoto Machijiri
- Viscount Kintomo Mushanokōji
- Baron Kōki Hirota
- Baron Tomoshige Samejima
- Baron Yoshitoshi Tokugawa
- Baron Mineo Ōsumi
- Baron Yoshimichi Hara
- Baron Sadao Araki
- Baron Shigeru Honjō
- Baron Takeji Nara
- Baron Nobuyoshi Mutō
- Baron Takeichi Nishi
- Marquis Kōichi Kido
- Marquis Daigo Tadashige
- Marquis Teruhisa Komatsu
- Marquis Ōkuma Shigenobu

==== Entrepreneurs ====
- Seihin Ikeda
- Ichizō Kobayashi: (President of Tokyo Gasu Denky and Hitachi group representative)
- Shōzō Murata: (President of Osaka Shosen Kaisha;as Sumitomo figure)
- Masatsune Ogura: (Sumitomo representative)
- Teijirō Toyoda: (representative of the Japanese Navy and Mitsui group)
- Yoshisuke Aikawa: (Representative of Nissan group)
- Fuji Fujisawa
- Noburu Ohtani: (President of N.Y.K. and Mitsubishi figure)
- Fujiyama Raita:Private businessman with Japanese Navy links in South Seas Mandate
- Kijirō Nambu:he was founded and led Nambu Arms Manufacturing Company during wartime

==== Other supporters ====
- Teiichi Muto: Government journalist in Asahi Shimbun and Japan Time and Advertiser Official News
- Toshio Shiratoru: Adviser in Foreign Affairs ministry, also heavy believer of Axis Powers alliance and Overseas Ambassador
- Yakichiro Suma: Spokesman in Foreign Affairs ministry; later official overseas Ambassador.
- Koh Ishii: Ex servant in Foreign Affairs Ministry and official Government spokesman
- Shūmei Ōkawa: Ultranationalist and fascist thinker, believer in government and military policies
- Akira Kazami: Konoye political partidaire and Justice Minister
- Fumio Gotō: Konoye political partner; also another fascist ideologist, supporter of Militarists
- Naoki Hoshino: Right-wing and Army follower charged to compose the economic policies of Manchukuo and Japan.

== See also ==
- Administrative structure of the Imperial Japanese Government
