= List of military instructors and trainers of the Empire of Japan =

A list of Imperial Army-Navy personnel with responsibility for military teaching and training of new recruits.

Commandants and Directors in Army War College

- Sadao Araki:- Commandant, War College
- Yaezo Akashiba:- Director War College
- Shuichi Miyazaki:- Deputy Commandant, War College
- Toshiro Obata:- Deputy Commandant, War College
- Jo Iimura:- Deputy Commandant in War College
- Tsunenori Kaya:- Commandant in War College

Commandments and Directors in the Imperial Japanese Army Academy

- Hideki Tōjō:- Commandant, Military Academy
- Kenzo Kitano:- Commandant, Military Academy
- Renya Mutaguchi:- Commandant, Military Academy
- Akira Mutō:- assigned Direction in Military Academy

Commander of the Naval War College

- Chuichi Nagumo:- Commander of Naval War College

President and Commander of the Naval War College

- Nobutake Kondō:- President of the Japanese Naval War College
- Sokichi Takagi:- Commander of the Japanese Naval War College

Commandants and Directors in Army and Navy academies and school

- Yoshikazu Nishi:- Commandant of the Field Artillery School
- Masatake Yasuoka:- Commandant of the Army Tank School
- Hitoshi Imamura:- Commandant, Narashino Army School
- Jirō Minami:- direction of Cavalry School
- Kyoji Tominaga:- Commandant, Kungchuling Army Tank School (Manchuria)
- Michio Sugawara:- Commandant, Shimoshizu Army Air School, Commandant, Military Air Academy, Air Training Army Commander
- Rikichi Tsukada:- Commanding General, Airborne Operations Training Unit
- Jisaburo Ozawa:- President of the Japanese Naval Academy
- Shigetarō Shimada:- Commandant, Imperial Navy Submarine School
- Kumaichi Teramoto:- Director, Hamamatsu Army Air School
- Heisuke Yanagawa:- Commandant of the Army Cavalry School
- Yoshitoshi Tokugawa:- Commandant of Akeno Army Aviation School and Tokorozawa Army Aviation School

Military Superintendents

- Rikichi Andō:- Superintendent, Toyama Army School
- Harukichi Hyakutake:- attached/Superintendent to Army Signal School, Superintendent, Hiroshima Military Prep School
- Korechika Anami:- Superintendent, Tokyo Military Preparatory School
- Mitsuo Nakazawa:- Superintendent, Military Preparatory Academy
- Tasuku Okada:- Superintendent, Army Tank School
- Ichiro Shichida:- Superintendent, Army School of Science, Superintendent, Toyama Army School
- Sizuichi Tanaka:- Superintendent, War College
- Kumaichi Teramoto:- Superintendent, Hamamatsu Army Air School
- Toshimichi Uemura:- Superintendent, Tokyo Army Preparatory School
- Otozō Yamada:- Superintendent, Military Academy

Military professors and instructors

- Heisuke Yanagawa:- Instructor at the War College
- Tsunenori Kaya:- Instructor at the War College
- Yasuhiko Asaka:- Instructor at the Military Academy
- Un Yi:- Instructor at Military Staff College
- Haruhito Kanin:- Instructor Attached to Chiba Army Tank School and War College
- Kenzo Kitano:- Commanding Officer, Senior-Course Cadet Unit
- Keisuke Fujie:- Instructor (Military Academy) also Director, Field Artillery School, Superintendent, War College
- Okikatsu Arao:- Instructor, Infantry School
- Masaharu Homma:- Instructor, War College
- Shōjirō Iida:- Instructor, Infantry School
- Tomitaro Horii:- attached to 3rd Infantry Regiment-Training Officer, Waseda University
- Kanji Ishiwara:- Instructor, War College
- Tadasu Kataoka:- Instructor, Army Cavalry School
- Masakazu Kawabe:- Commanding Officer, Training Regiment, infantry School
- Torashirō Kawabe:- Instructor (Tactics), War College, Hamamatsu Army Flying School
- Kiyotake Kawaguchi:- Instructor, Army Heavy Artillery School
- Heitarō Kimura:- Instructor, War College, Artillery Department, Office of Military Training
- Seiichi Kita:- Instructor, War College
- Koiso Kuniaki:- Instructor, Military Academy
- Shiro Makino:- Instructor, Military Academy also Senior Instructor/Superintendent, Military Preparatory Academy
- Jinsaburo Mazaki:- Instructor, Training Unit Military Academy
- Shuichi Miyazaki:- Instructor Cadet Unit, Military Academy Preparatory School, Military Instructor, War College, Deputy Commandant, War College
- Takeshi Mori:- Instructor, Cavalry School; Instructor, War College
- Toshizō Nishio:- Instructor, War College, Section Chief, Office of Military Training
- Fukutaro Nishiyama:- Instructor, Military Academy
- Tetsuzan Nagata:- Office of Military Training
- Masutaro Nakai:- Instructor, Military Academy (tactics)
- Mitsuo Nakazawa:- Instructor, War College, Superintendent, Military Preparatory Academy
- Kanji Nishihara:- concurrently Instructor, War College
- Kengo Noda:- Instructor, Infantry School, Commanding Officer, Training Unit, Infantry School
- Shihei Oba:- Commanding Officer, Infantry Unit, Toyohashi Reserve Officer School
- Hideyoshi Obata:- Instructor, War College, Commandant, Akeno Army Air School
- Sanji Okido:- Instructor, War College, November
- Ichiro Shichida:- Instructor, Infantry School, Superintendent, Military Preparatory Academy, Director, Military Academy, Superintendent, Army School of Science, Superintendent, Toyama Army School
- Takuma Shimoyama:- Instructor, Military Academy, Office of Military Training, Instructor, War College
- Hisakazu Tanaka:- Instructor, War College
- Rikichi Tsukada:- Attached, Training Unit, Shimoshizu Army Air School, Instructor, Hamamatsu Army Air School and Commanding General, Airborne Operations Training Unit
- Jun Ushiroku:- attached to Training Unit, Military Academy
- Otozō Yamada:- Instructor, War College, Instructor, Cavalry School Chief, Army Signal School, Superintendent, Military Academy
- Takeo Yasuda:- Instructor, Artillery and Engineering School, Member, Research Branch, Army Signal School, LtCol, May Member, Research Branch, Army Signal School
- Hitoshi Asano:- Instructor, Akeno and Narashino Air base
- Ichiki Kioyonao:- Instructor, Army Infantry School
- Sokichi Takagi:- instructor of the Naval Staff college
- Shigetarō Shimada:- Instructor, Naval War College, Commandant, Imperial Navy Submarine School
- Nobuo Fujita:- Instructor Japanese Navy Air force
- Saburō Sakai:- Instructor, Ohmura Navy Airbase
- Hiroyoshi Nishizawa:- Instructor, Yokosuka Navy Airfield
- Tetsuzō Iwamoto:- Instructor, Yokosuka and Tokushima Navy Airfield

Technicians, researchers and experts in military sciences

- Takushiro Hattori:- General Staff Headquarters-Army Tank School, Research Section, Army Engineer School, Research Section
- Ichiki Kioyonao:- Member, Research Branch, Toyama Army School, Instructor, Army Infantry School
- Jo Iimura:- Instructor and Deputy Commandant in War College, Member, Research Staff, War College; Chief, Total Warfare Research Institute, he made extensive trips throughout East Asia, to collect instructional materials and operative practices.
- Kanji Nishihara:- Director, Research Department, Infantry School Deputy Commandant, Narashino Army School, concurrently Instructor, War College
- Teiichi Suzuki:- Member, Research Division, War College
- Takeo Yasuda:- Member, Research Branch, Army Signal School
- Michio Sugawara:- Major (Air Force); Section Chief, Army Aeronautical Department
- Kumaichi Teramoto:- LtCol (Air Force), Officer attached; later Member in Army Aeronautical Department
- Takeo Yasuda:- Officer attached to Army Air Technical Laboratories (MajGen)
- Yoshitoshi Tokugawa:- Director of the Research Department and Director of Technical Training Department, Tokorozawa Army Aviation School

== See also ==
- Rikugun Shikan Gakko
