= Jōichirō =

- Gender: Male

Origin
- Origin: Japanese
- Meaning: Different meanings depending on the kanji used

Jōichirō, Joichiro, Jouichirou or Johichiroh (written: 丈一郎 or 穣一郎) is a masculine Japanese given name. Notable people with the name include:

- Joichiro Sanada (真田 穣一郎) (1897–1957), Japanese general
- Joichiro Tatsuyoshi (辰吉 丈一郎) (born 1970), Japanese boxer
