= Administrative structure of the Imperial Japanese Government =

The administrative structure of the government of the Empire of Japan on the eve of the Second World War broadly consisted of the Cabinet, the civil service, local and prefectural governments, the governments-general of Chosen (Korea) and Formosa (Taiwan) and the colonial offices. It underwent several changes during the wartime years, and was entirely reorganized when the Empire of Japan was officially dissolved in 1947.

== Central government ==
The main organ of the central government was the Cabinet (naikaku), which consisted of the Prime Minister or Premier (naikaku sōri-daijin) and, before 1947, 12 to 14 Ministers of State, each heading a ministry (department). Under each Minister of State were two Vice-Ministers, a Permanent Vice-Minister responsible for administration and a Parliamentary Vice-Minister responsible for representing the ministry in the Diet. Each Parliamentary Vice-Minister was assisted by a Parliamentary Councillor. Each ministry comprised several bureaux, each headed by a director who oversaw several bureau sections. Each section was headed by a section chief.

=== The Prime Minister's Office ===
Several bureaux and officials were directly responsible to the Prime Minister. In 1939, the Prime Minister's Office consisted of the Prime Minister, his Chief Secretary, and the Planning Board and several separate bureaux, each headed by a president or director who reported directly to the Prime Minister:

- The Planning Board (Headed by a President): Established in October 1937; responsible for submitting recommendations to the Prime Minister on matters of national importance, and coordinating their implementation.
- Bureau of Legislation (Headed by a President): Responsible for drafting legislation and ordinances.
- Bureau of Decorations (Headed by a President): Responsible for decorations and their annuities.
- Bureau for Manchurian Affairs (Headed by a President): Established in December 1934. Responsible for all matters concerning the Kwantung Leased Territory and the South Manchuria Railway Zone

There were also four separate bureaux for Information, the Tohoku (North-Eastern Districts), Information and Pensions, each headed by a director reporting to the Prime Minister.

As well, the Prime Minister headed numerous committees as necessary.

=== The Cabinet ===
Headed by the Prime Minister, until 1942 the Cabinet consisted of the following ministries (departments):

- Ministry of Foreign Affairs (Gaimu-sho): located at Kasumigaseki 1-chome, Kojimachi-ku, Tokyo
- Ministry of Home Affairs (Naimu-sho): located at Sakuradamachi, Kojimachi-ku, Tokyo
- Ministry of Finance (Okura-sho): located at Otamachi 1-chome, Kojimachi-ku, Tokyo
- Ministry of War (Army Ministry) (Rikugun-sho): located at Nagatacho, Kojimachi-ku, Tokyo
- Ministry of the Navy (Navy Ministry) (Kaigun-sho): located at Kasumigaseki 2-chome, Kojimachi-ku, Tokyo
- Ministry of Justice (Shiho-sho): located at West Hibiya-cho, Kojimachi-ku, Tokyo
- Ministry of Education (Mombu-sho): located at Sannen-cho, Kojimachi-ku, Tokyo
- Ministry of Agriculture and Forestry (Norin-sho): located at Otemachi, Kojimachi-ku, Tokyo
- Ministry of Commerce and Industry (Shoko-sho): located at Kobiki-cho, 10-chome, Kyobashi-ku, Tokyo
- Ministry of Communications (Teishin-sho): located at Otemachi 2-chome, Kojimachi-ku, Tokyo
- Ministry of Railways (Tetsudo-sho): located at Otemachi 1-chome, Kojimachi-ku, Tokyo
- Ministry of Overseas Affairs (Takamu-sho): located at West Hibiya-cho, Kojimachi-ku, Tokyo
- Ministry of Health and Social Affairs (Kosei-sho)

In November 1942, the Ministry of the Greater Co-Prosperity Sphere (Daitōa-shō) was formed by merging the earlier Ministry of Overseas Affairs with the East Asia Department and South Pacific Department of the Foreign Ministry and the East Asia Development Board, formed in 1938 as a separate cabinet-level agency. In November 1943, the Ministry of Munitions (Gunju-sho) was formed from the Board of Planning of the Ministry of Commerce and Industry

==== Ministry of Foreign Affairs ====
Responsible for administration of diplomatic affairs and diplomats and the protection of commercial interests and overseas Japanese. Until 1942, structured as follows:

- East Asiatic Bureau:
  - First Section: Diplomatic affairs related to China, Hong Kong and Macau
  - Second Section: Diplomatic affairs related to Thailand and the protection and control of overseas Japanese in Thailand, China, Hong Kong and Macau
  - Third Section: Diplomatic affairs related to Manchukuo
- European and Asiatic Bureau:
  - First Section: Diplomatic affairs related to the Soviet Union, Finland, the Baltic states, Turkey, Poland, the Empire of Iran and the Kingdom of Afghanistan
  - Second Section: Diplomatic affairs related to all European and other nations, which are not overseen by any other bureau or section.
- American Bureau:
  - First Section: Diplomatic affairs related to the Dominion of Canada and the United States of America and its territories
  - Second Section: Diplomatic affairs related to all Central and South American nations
  - Third Section: Matters related to emigration and passports
- Commercial Bureau:
  - First Section: Institutions and policies of trade and navigation
  - Second Section: Promotion and protection of trade and navigation
  - Third Section: Commercial affairs and reports
- Treaties Bureau:
  - First Section: Drafting, interpreting, sanctioning, publishing and revising treaties with foreign nations
  - Second Section: International judicial matters
  - Third Section: League of Nations
- Information Bureau:
  - First Section: Daily news and broadcasting
  - Second Section: Publications, foreign news agencies, propaganda and international meetings
  - Third Section: Distribution of diplomatic information
- Investigations Bureau:
  - First Section: General business and diplomatic facts
  - Second Section: Records and materials
  - Third Section: Diplomatic and commercial investigations in Asia and the Near East
  - Fourth Section: Diplomatic and commercial investigations in Europe and Oceania
  - Fifth Section: Investigations in North and South America
- Cultural Works Bureau: Promotion and assistance with cultural matters relating to China

==== Ministry of Home Affairs ====
Responsible for shrines, prefectural administration, elections, police, public works, town planning and publication and copyrights. Supervised the police and prefectural governors.

- Bureau of Shrines
- Bureau of Local Affairs: Elections, local public matters of financial and economic consequence, prefectural conscription and requisition, forests, reclamation and like matters in Hokkaido
- Bureau of Public Order: Police, printed matter and publications
- Bureau of Public Works: Including those for prefectural governments
- Bureau of Town and City Planning

The following were under the direct supervision of the Minister:

- Disabled Soldiers' Asylum
- National Shrines Building Office
- Police Educational Institute
- National House of Correction for the Improvement of Juvenile Criminals
- National Leprosaria

==== Ministry of Finance ====
Responsible for accounts, payments, receipts of public monies, taxation, bonds, coins, management and sale of negotiable instruments in custody of the government, banking, trusts, mutual loan associations and prefectural and local finances

- Bureau of Accounts: The national budget, accounts, treasury matters
- Bureau of Taxation: Taxes and customs and excise tariffs
- Bureau of Fund Employment: Employment of national funds, administration of national treasury monies, coinage and currency circulation, national loans, accident and relief funds, deposits and negotiable securities, annuities and public loans floated by public associations.
- Banking Bureau: Ordinary, special and savings banks, general banking affairs, cooperative societies and city credit unions

The following were under the direct supervision of the Minister:

- Deposits Bureau: Management of the deposits of ordinary subjects of the middle and lower classes
- Foreign Exchange Control Bureau
- National Property Bureau: All matters pertaining to national properties
- Bureau of the Mint (in Osaka): Minting of coins and medals, casting of national orders and decorations and research on metals
- Bureaux of Customs: Epidemic registrations, quarantines and medical examinations for persons entering the nation, customs duties, shipping controls
  - Customs Houses: Yokohama, Kobe, Osaka, Nagasaki, Moji, Nagoya and Hakodate
- Bureaux of Revenue Superintendence: Matters concerning tax collection
  - Local Offices: Tokyo, Osaka, Sapporo, Sendai, Nagoya, Hiroshima, Kumamoto, Imperial Army and Imperial Navy
- Monopolies Bureau: Administration of government monopolies on tobacco, salt, camphor and pure alcohol
- Brewing Laboratory
- Committees on Tariff Petition Examination, National Property Survey, Building Central Office and Tariff Investigation

== See also ==
- List of Japanese government and military commanders of World War II
