= First Air Army (Japan) =

The First Air Army (Japanese: 第1航空軍, romanized: Dai 1 Kōkū gun) was part of the Japanese Imperial Army during World War 2. It had its headquarters in Tokyo, basing in the Kanto Plain. The 1st was responsible for covering the Japanese home islands, Taiwan, Korea, Kuril Islands, and South Sakhalin.

== History ==
Formed under Military Ordinance Order No 31 on 13 April 1942 and initially headquartered at Gifu on 5 June 1942 before being relocated to Miyakezaka, Tokyo in response to the allied airstrikes on mainland Japan. In July July 1944, the Headquarters was moved to the main building of Seikei University, Musashino-shi.

On 8 April 1945, in accordance with Operation Ketsugō (決号作戦, ketsugō sakusen), the countermeasure plan of Operation Downfall, the 1st together with the 2nd, 5th, and 6th Air Armys were transferred to the Headquarters of the Army Air Force. It remained under their command until the end of the war.

== Commanders ==
- Lieutenant General Takeo Yasuda - Commander of the First Air Army between 1 June 1942 and April 1943 and head of the Army Aeronautical Department and Inspectorate General of Aviation. Yasuda was a strong advocate of the use of suicidal ramming tactics against American bombers. He returned to command of the 1st Air Army as part of the preparations for the final defense of the Japanese home islands against Allied invasion; however, he retired shortly before the war's end.
- Lieutenant General Teramoto Kumaichi from 1 May 1943 to 19 July 1943 when he transferred to Rabual to take command of the Fourth Air Army
- Lieutenant General Prince Yi Un (李王垠) from 20 July 1943 to 31 March 1945
- Lieutenant General Takeo Yasuda from 1 April 1945 to ? 1945

== Units ==
The Air Army (航空軍, Kōkū gun) was made up of two or more Air Corps (飛行集団, Hikō Shudan (renamed Air Divisions (飛行師団, Hikō Shidan in 1942) plus some Independent Units. Each Air Division consisted of an Air Brigade (飛行団, Hikōdan) together with base and support units and a number of Independent Squadrons. Each Air Brigade had two or more Air Combat Groups (Air Combat Group (飛行戦隊, Hikō Sentai). The Air Combat Group was a single-purpose unit consisting typically of three Squadrons (飛行隊, Hikōtai), divided into three flights (小隊, shōtai) of three aircraft each.

- 10th Division (第10飛行師団, Hikō Shidan) - responsible for the defence of Tokyo
- 5th Brigade (第5飛行団, Hikōdan)
- 12th Brigade (第15飛行団)
- 16th Brigade (第16飛行団) - established in 1944 and based in the Philippines for a time before returning to Hōfu
- 1st Air Force Education Corp (第1航空軍教育隊)
- 40th Aviation District Command (第40航空地区司令部)
- 46th Aviation District Command (第46航空地区司令部)
- 62nd Aviation District Command (第62航空地区司令部)
- 4th Aviation Communications Command (第4航空通信司令部)
- 13th Aviation Regiment (第13航空通信連隊)
