= Thirty-Eighth Army (Japan) =

Japanese Thirty-Eighth Army
- Active: November 9, 1942 - August 15, 1945
- Country: Empire of Japan
- Branch: Imperial Japanese Army
- Type: Infantry
- Role: Corps
- Garrison/HQ: Hanoi
- Nickname(s): Shin (信, Trustworthy)

The Japanese 38th Army (第38軍, Dai-sanjyūhachi gun) was an army of the Imperial Japanese Army during World War II.

== History ==
The Indochina Garrison Army (印度支那駐屯軍, Indoshina Chutongun) was formed on September 9, 1942 under the Southern Expeditionary Army Group following the Japanese invasion and occupation of French Indochina.

On November 12, 1944, with the threat of possible landings of Allied forces to retake French Indochina increasing, the organizational structure of the Southern Expeditionary Army changed, and the Indochina Garrison Army was re-designated the Japanese Thirty-Eighth Army. It remained stationed in French Indochina as a garrison force as before.

The Japanese 38th Army was involved in the Meigo Sakusen (Operation Bright Moon) of March 1945, which resulted in the proclamation of the Empire of Vietnam independent from French rule.

The Japanese 38th Army was demobilized at the surrender of Japan on August 15, 1945 at Hanoi.

== List of commanders ==
=== Commanding officer ===
	Name	From	To	
1	Lieutenant General Viscount Kazumoto Machijiri	10 November 1942	22 November 1944	Indochina Garrison Army
2	Lieutenant General Yuitsu Tsuchihashi	22 November 1944	20 December 1944	Indochina Garrison Army
3	Lieutenant General Yuitsu Tsuchihashi	20 December 1944	September 1945	Japanese 38th Army

=== Chief of Staff ===
	Name	From	To	
1	Lieutenant General Saburo Kawamura	5 December 1942	22 November 1944	Indochina Garrison Army
2	Lieutenant General Saburo Kawamura	20 December 1944	2 June 1945	Japanese 38th Army
3	Major General Teiji Koudo	2 June 1945	September 1945	Japanese 38th Army
