= Makoto Matsutani =

Japanese military officer and secretary

- 松谷 誠
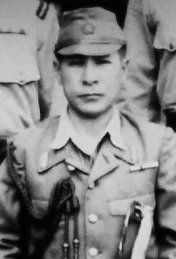
- Born: January 13, 1903
- Died: October 7, 1998 (aged 95)
- Military career
- Allegiance: Empire of Japan; Japan
- Branch: Imperial Japanese Army; Japan Ground Self-Defense Force
- Rank: Colonel; Officer
- Commands: Northern Self-Defence Force
- Conflicts: World War II

Makoto Matsutani (松谷 誠, Matsutani Makoto; January 13, 1903 – October 7, 1998) was a Japanese military officer and military secretary to the prime minister of Japan.

== Career ==
In November 1944, Colonel Matsutani became the secretary to Sugiyama Hajime, the newly appointed Army Minister. In this role he began to consult with others and a four-man team (Matsutani, Toshikazu Kase, Matsudaira, and Rear Admiral Sokichi Takagi) put together a secret report recommending practical strategies for handling the defeat of Japan.

When Matsutani retired he was commanding officer of the Northern Self-Defence Force.

== Views ==
In a textbook issued to officers at the National Defence College in May 1973, Matsutani expressed the view that in the Vietnam War the Americans had underestimated the power of nationalism, as they were fighting from a purely ideological perspective, and said that the Japanese should learn this lesson.

== Bibliography ==
- Makoto Matsutani (1980). Dai Tōa sensō shūshi no shinsō (The True Account of the Conclusion of the Greater East Asian War). Tokyo: Fuyō Shobō.
