= Yuitsu Tsuchihashi =

Japanese army officer (1891–1972)

- 土橋 勇逸
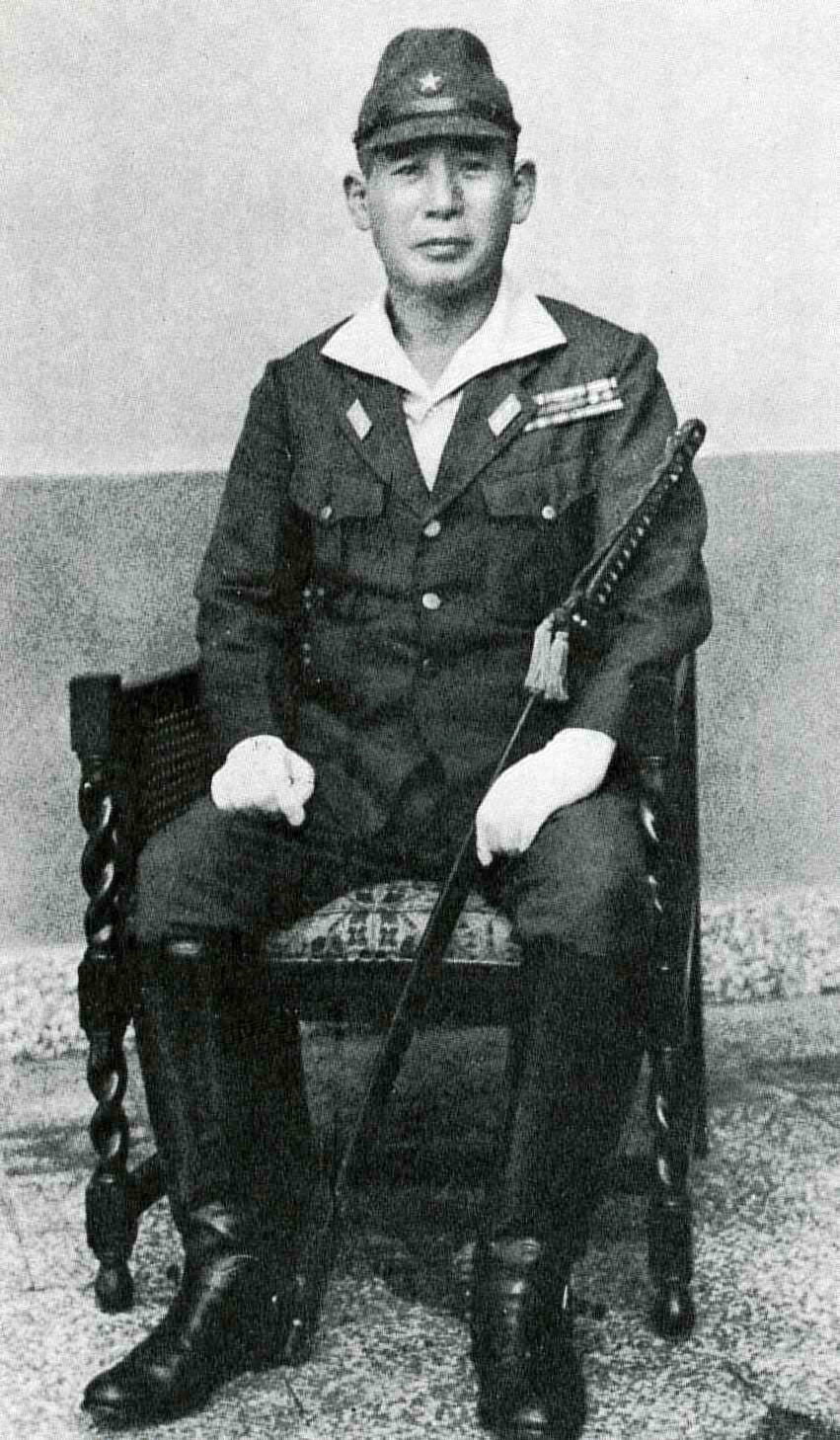

Governor-General of French Indochina under Japanese occupation
- In office 9 March 1945 – 28 August 1945
- Monarch: Shōwa
- Prime Minister: Kuniaki Koiso; Suzuki Kantarō; Naruhiko Higashikuni
- Preceded by: Jean Decoux
- Succeeded by: Takeshi Tsukamoto (Acting)

Personal details
- Born: January 1, 1891 Saga Prefecture, Japan
- Died: May 31, 1972 (aged 81)
- Education: Army War College

Military service
- Allegiance: Empire of Japan
- Branch/service: Imperial Japanese Army
- Years of service: 1912-1945
- Rank: Lieutenant General
- Commands: 48th Division; 38th Army
- Battles/wars: World War II

Yuitsu Tsuchihashi (土橋 勇逸, Tsuchihashi Yūitsu; 1 January 1891 – 31 May 1972) was a lieutenant general in the Imperial Japanese Army in World War II.

== Biography ==
=== Early career ===
Tsuchihashi was born in Saga prefecture and graduated from the 24th class of Imperial Japanese Army Academy in 1912 and the 32nd class of the Army Staff College in 1920. In 1921 he was assigned to the Imperial Japanese Army General Staff Office, and from 1923 to 1924 was assigned to learn French at the Tokyo Foreign Language School in Kanda, Tokyo.

He was stationed in Europe between 1924 and 1927 as a military attache to France and the League of Nations. After his return to Tokyo, he served as a battalion commander in the 1st Infantry Regiment, and in various administrative posts within the Imperial Japanese Army General Staff. In August 1935, following his promotion to colonel, he was immediately given command of the IJA 20th Infantry Regiment. In August 1937, he was assigned as a military liaison to France.

=== World War II ===
After his promotion to major general in July 1938, Tsuchihashi became chief of staff of the IJA 21st Army in August 1939, which was transferred to combat operations in the Second Sino-Japanese War as part of the China Expeditionary Army. The primary role of the IJA 21st Army was the Canton Operation (the invasion of Guangdong Province in southern China), together with the Imperial Japanese Navy’s 5th Fleet, which it completed by the end of the year. The IJA 21st Army was disbanded on February 9, 1940, and Tshuchihashi returned to Tokyo to become military liaison to the Chinese Embassy.

After his promotion to lieutenant general in August 1941, he was sent to Taiwan in September 1941 to command the newly-formed IJA 48th Division. After the outbreak of the Pacific War, the IJA 48th Division was among the first Japanese forces to land in the Philippines as part of the IJA 14th Army, and Tsuchihashi's forces captured Manila, but did not participate in the Battle of Bataan. Instead, in January 1942 his division was transferred to the control of the IJA 16th Army in eastern Java, where was assigned the capture of Surabaya and its strategic oil fields on 7 March 1942.

Afterwards, Tsuchihashi and the IJA 48th Division was subsequently assigned to garrison the island of Timor. Although the island had been captured by Japan in the Battle of Timor, much of the island was still in the hands of Australian and Dutch commandos. Tsuchihashi launched a major counter-offensive in an attempt to push the Australians into a corner on the south coast of the island. The Japanese also recruited significant numbers of Timorese civilians, who provided intelligence on Allied movements. The island was secured when the remaining Australian commandos were evacuated in December 1942.

In November 1944, Tsuchihashi was sent to French Indochina to reorganize and take command of the 38th Army. In March 1945, he played a crucial role in the Japanese coup d'état in French Indochina and became the provisional Governors-General of French Indochina. Tsuchihachi maintained the Japanese policy of neutrality in Indochinese internal politics, and formed a government of French-trained but nationalist ministers. Just before the Japanese surrender, Tsuchihashi met with envoys of the Viet Minh and agreed to turn over power to their movement; however, only days later, French forces arrived to reimpose colonial rule.

After the surrender of Japan, Tsuchihashi was taken prisoner by the Nationalist Chinese in Hanoi and held in a prisoner of war camp in Guangdong province, China. In January 1948, he was transferred to French control in Saigon, where he remained until he was released in July 1949. He returned to Japan in June 1950, where he lived in obscurity until his death in 1972.
