= Kazumoto Machijiri =

Imperial Japanese Army lieutenant general (1889–1950)

Viscount Kazumoto Machijiri
- 町尻 量基
- Born: 30 March 1889; Kyoto, Japan
- Died: 10 December 1950 (aged 61)
- Education: Imperial Japanese Army Academy; Army Staff College
- Spouse: Yukiko
- Family: Mibu Motonaka (biological father); Machijiri Kazuhiro (adoptive father); Prince Kaya Kuninori (father-in-law)
- Military career
- Allegiance: Empire of Japan
- Branch: Imperial Japanese Army
- Service years: 1909–1945
- Rank: Lieutenant general
- Units: Ministry of War, Northern China Area Army, Imperial Japanese Army General Staff
- Commands: Artillery Regiment (Imperial Guard), IJA 6th Division, Indochina Garrison Army
- Conflicts: Second Sino-Japanese War; World War II
- Other work: Military attaché, delegate, aide-de-camp

Viscount Kazumoto Machijiri (町尻 量基, Machijiri Kazumoto; 30 March 1889 – 10 December 1950) was a lieutenant general in the Imperial Japanese Army during World War II.

== Biography ==
Machijiri was the fourth son of the kuge Mibu Motonaka (1835–1906) from an ancient court nobility family of Kyoto. He was adopted into the kazoku peerage by Viscount Machijiri Kazuhiro and inherited the title of shishaku. His wife was the elder daughter of Prince Kaya Kuninori, Yukiko.

Machijiri graduated from the 21st class of the Imperial Japanese Army Academy in 1909, where his classmates included Kanji Ishiwara, Jo Iimura and Harukichi Hyakutake. He later graduated from the 29th class of the Army Staff College in 1917. He was a military attaché to France from 1919–1921, participated for three months in the Versailles Peace Treaty negotiations, and remained as a resident officer in Paris from 1921–1923, and again from 1925–1926.

Machijiri was aide-de-camp to the Emperor of Japan from 1930–1935. From 1935–1936, he commanded the Artillery Regiment of the Imperial Guard, and served as Chief of Army Affairs Section of Military Affairs Bureau within the Ministry of War from 1936–1938.

At the start of the Second Sino-Japanese War, Machijiri was again appointed as Aide-de-camp to Emperor Hirohito in 1937, but was soon transferred to become Vice Chief of Staff of the Northern China Area Army. He returned to Japan the same year for staff duties within the Imperial Japanese Army General Staff, but was sent into the field again from 1939–1941 as commander of the IJA 6th Division. From 1941–1942, he was Inspector-General of the Chemical Warfare Section.

In 1942, Machijiri was appointed commander of the Indochina Garrison Army. Recalled to Japan in 1944, he survived the war and went into retirement in 1945.
