= Organization of Japanese defensive units in Okinawa =

Organization of Japanese defensive units in Okinawa prior to the American invasion.

The defense of Okinawa Island was weakened when the 9th Division was transferred to Taiwan. Ground forces on the island ended up with only the 24th and 62nd Divisions and the 44th Independent Mixed Brigade as the core of the Thirty-second Army commanded by Lieutenant General Mitsuru Ushijima

== Commander of Okinawan defensive forces ==
- Mitsuru Ushijima - Commander of Japanese Army forces in Okinawa
- Isamu Cho - Sub Commander of Japanese Army forces in Okinawa

== Deployable land units ==
- Thirty-second Army - Mitsuru Ushijima
- 24th Division - Tatsumi Amamiya
- 62nd Division - Takeo Fujioka
- Keiichi Arikawa: Commanding Officer Infantry Group 62nd Division, Okinawa
- Kunisaki Detachment
- 44th Independent Mixed Brigade
- 9th Division (transferred to Taiwan)
- 27th Tank Regiment - Lieut. Colonel Murakami

== Air Squadrons in the area ==
=== Japanese Navy ===
- Tokushima Air Group
- Others Air Groups

=== Japanese Army ===
For the Okinawa campaign, the Army planned to commit a total of 970 planes:

- Homeland (Kyushu, Shikoku)
  - Sixth Air Army—220
  - Tokko units—300
- Taiwan Area:
  - 8th Air Division—200
  - Tokko units—250

== Japanese Special Forces in Okinawa ==
Later elements of the Giretsu (Heroic) Airborne Unit were dropped upon North and Central Airfields, engaged in hand-to-hand fighting, and for a time seized control of both strips.
