= Military Secretary =

Military Secretary is a post found in the military of several countries:

- Military Secretary (India)
- Military Secretary to the Prime Minister, Israel
- Military Secretary (Pakistan)
- Military Secretary (Sri Lanka)
- Military Secretary (United Kingdom)
- Military Secretary to the Commandant of the Marine Corps, United States

== See also ==
- Bureau of Military Affairs, a military bureau in several imperial Chinese and Inner Asian dynasties, sometimes translated as Military Secretariat
