= Kotani =

Notable people named Kotani include:

== A ==
- Arisa Kotani (born 2000), Japanese curler

== E ==
- Eric Kotani, pseudonym of the Japanese-born American astrophysicist Yoji Kondo (1933–2017) who also wrote science fiction

== H ==
- Henry Kotani (1887–1972), Japanese film director and cinematographer
- Hiroki Kotani (born 1971), Japanese mixed martial artist
- Hiroki Kotani (born 1993), Japanese football player

== K ==
- Kengo Kotani (born 1992), Japanese football player for Giravanz Kitakyushu
- Kenzō Kotani (1909–2003), the last Yasukuni Shrine swordsmith
- Kinya Kotani (born 1979), singer and actor from Saitama Prefecture, Japan

== M ==
- Mari Kotani (born 1958), Japanese science fiction critic and author
- Masao Kotani (1906–1993), Japanese theoretical physicist, known for molecular physics and biophysics
- Mikako Kotani (born 1966), Japanese former synchronized swimmer who competed in the 1988 Summer Olympics
- Motoko Kotani (Japanese: 小谷 元子, born 1960), Japanese mathematician

== N ==
- Naoyuki Kotani (born 1981), Japanese mixed martial artist

== O ==
- Ozzie Kotani, slack-key guitar player

== R ==
- Roland Kotani, Democratic member of the Hawaii State House of Representatives

== S ==
- Sumiyuki Kotani (1903–1991), Japanese martial artist

== T ==
- Toshiyuki Kotani, also known as styleos, is a Japanese video game illustrator and character designer

== Y ==
- Yasuko Kotani (born 1962), Japanese photographer
- Yoshikazu Kotani (born 1982), Japanese actor and singer
- Yuki Kotani (born 1991), Japanese football player
- Yuna Kotani (born 1998), Japanese curler
- Yuriko Kotani, UK-based Japanese comedian

== See also ==
- Kottani, a settlement in the municipality Myki in the Xanthi regional unit of Greece
