= Torashirō Kawabe =

Imperial Japanese Army lieutenant general (1890–1960)

- 河辺 虎四郎
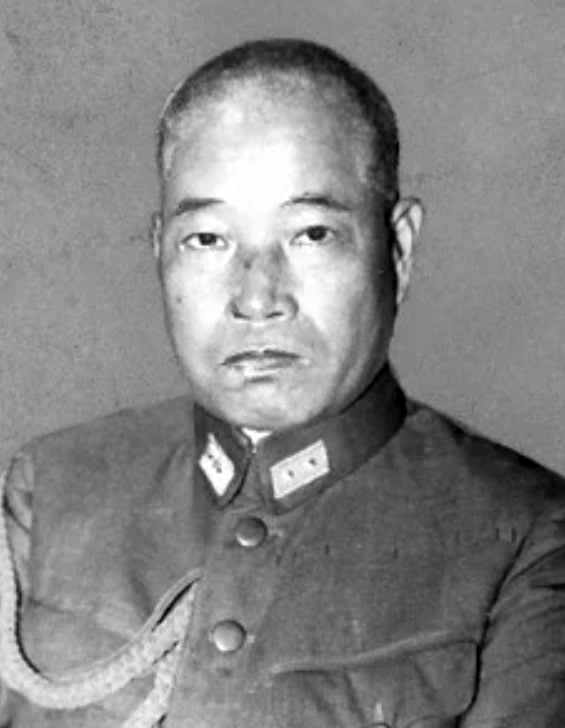
- Born: 25 September 1890; Toyama, Japan
- Died: 25 June 1960 (aged 69)
- Education: Imperial Japanese Army Academy; Artillery and Engineers School; Army War College
- Family: Masakazu Kawabe (brother)
- Military career
- Allegiance: Empire of Japan
- Branch: Imperial Japanese Army
- Service years: 1912–1945
- Rank: Lieutenant general
- Units: Imperial Japanese Army General Staff Office; Kwantung Army; General Defense Command
- Commands: IJA 2nd Air Force; Inspectorate General of Aviation
- Conflicts: Second Sino-Japanese War; World War II
- Other work: Military attaché Deputy Chief of the IJA General Staff

Torashirō Kawabe (河辺 虎四郎, Kawabe Torashirō; 25 September 1890 – 25 June 1960) was a lieutenant general in the Imperial Japanese Army and Deputy Chief of Staff of the Imperial Japanese Army General Staff Office during World War II. He was the younger brother of general Masakazu Kawabe.

== Biography ==
Born in Toyama Prefecture, Kawabe graduated from the 24th class of the Imperial Japanese Army Academy in 1912, with a specialty in field artillery. After completing his studies at the Artillery and Engineers School in 1915, and later the 33rd class of the Army War College in 1921, he eventually served in the Operations Division of the Imperial Japanese Army General Staff Office from 1922 to 1925.

Assigned as resident staff officer in Riga, Latvia in 1926, Kawabe studied Soviet affairs for two years before his return to Japan. Kawabe, then a major, became an instructor in tactics at the Army War College between 1928 and 1929, before being reassigned to the Imperial Japanese Army General Staff. After three years, Kawabe was stationed in Moscow as a military attaché until 1934, when he was sent to the Kwantung Army as a staff officer and chief of its intelligence section. He was promoted to colonel in 1935. While serving with the Kwantung Army, Kawabe became involved in the Japanese government's efforts, through local Chinese warlord Li Shouxin, to gain control of Chahar Province in northeast Inner Mongolia. After serving briefly as commander of a field artillery regiment in the Imperial Guards Division, Kawabe was appointed to the General Staff as a member of the War Leadership Council and, following the Marco Polo Bridge incident, was one of the few senior officers who supported General Kanji Ishiwara in opposing Japan's further involvement in China.

After promotion to major general in 1938, Kawabe was again posted overseas as a military attaché, this time to Berlin, Germany and to Budapest, Hungary for two years. He was recalled to Japan shortly before Japan's entry into World War II. In early 1941, he was assigned to the General Defense Command. He was promoted to lieutenant general in 1941 and head of the Inspectorate General of Aviation. In 1943, he was given command of the IJA 2nd Air Force, but returned to staff assignments in 1944.

Kawabe was appointed Deputy Chief of the Imperial Japanese Army General Staff Office in April 1945, in which capacity he headed the Japanese delegation to Manila for negotiations with General Douglas MacArthur regarding Japan's surrender.
