= Nobuzo Tohmatsu =

Japanese admiral (1896–1980)

- 等松 農夫蔵
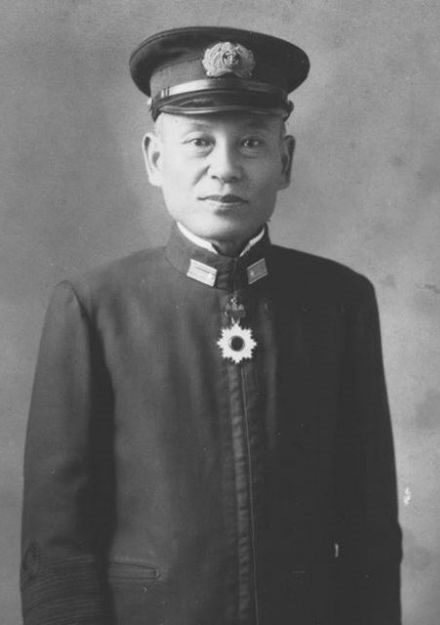
- Born: 25 April 1896; Gunma Prefecture, Japan
- Died: 28 December 1980 (aged 84)
- Military career
- Allegiance: Empire of Japan
- Branch: Imperial Japanese Navy
- Service years: 1917–1946
- Rank: Vice Admiral
- Conflicts: World War II
- Other work: Deloitte Touche Tohmatsu

Nobuzo Tohmatsu (等松 農夫蔵, Tōmatsu Nobuzō; 25 April 1896 – 28 December 1980) was an admiral in the Imperial Japanese Navy in World War II who went on to become an accountant and a namesake of the global auditing firm Deloitte Touche Tohmatsu, today the world's largest professional services company.

== Biography ==
Born in Tomioka city, Gunma Prefecture, Tohmatsu graduated from the 6th class of the Imperial Japanese Naval Paymaster Academy in 1917. He was ranked 4th out of a class of 21 cadets. As a midshipman, he served on the battleship Fusō and cruiser Asama. Once commissioned as an ensign, he was assigned to the battleship Hyūga and cruisers Izumo, and Mogami, followed by Shiretoko.

In 1922, he left maritime duty to take up a paymaster position at Sasebo Naval Arsenal; he later (as lieutenant commander) served as an ordnance accountant in both the Shipbuilding and Naval Air Commands. In 1934, he was designated naval attaché to the United Kingdom, where he served until 1936. While in London, he had the honor of being invited to King George V's silver wedding anniversary at Buckingham Palace.

During World War II, Tohmatsu achieved the rank of captain and served as chief of several bureaus in the Navy, including the Bureau of Supply and Bureau of Accounting. He was also briefly a member of the Bureau of Naval Affairs. In May 1945, he became a rear admiral: following Japan's surrender later that year, he assisted Allied occupation officials in accounting for and removing ordnance supplies throughout the country. He resigned from the Navy in August 1946.

Tohmatsu became a certified public accountant in 1952 and joined a Western-owned accounting firm in Tokyo, during an era when locally owned Japanese businesses were still small. Tōmatsu became well-known, partly due to the large number of Japanese accountants who had studied under him during the 1930s and 1940s. He became president of the Japanese CPA Association in 1967.

Around that time, the Japanese government began an initiative to establish subsidized domestic accounting firms. Tohmatsu seized the opportunity and joined accountant Iwao Tomita, one of his former students who had gone on to attend the Wharton School, to form the firm of Tohmatsu & Co. in 1968. Tohmatsu grew along with Japan's economy, and by Tohmatsu's death in 1980 it had become one of the world's largest auditors. In 1975, it merged into Touche Ross, which later became Deloitte & Touche in 1990, and Tōmatsu's name was appended in 1995 to change the name of the firm to “Deloitte Touche Tohmatsu”.

== See also ==
- Deloitte Touche Tohmatsu
