= Inspectorate General of Aviation =

Imperial Japanese Army aeronautical training department

The Inspectorate-General of Army Aviation or Inspectorate General of Aviation (陸軍航空総監部, Rikugun kōkū sōkanbu) was a section of the Imperial Japanese Army Aeronautical Department charged with planning and supervision of the training of flying and air maintenance personnel of the Imperial Japanese Army Air Service.

It was under the control and supervision of the General Affairs Unit of Inspectorate of Army Aviation and Air Training and Instruction Department.

== Composition ==
It was headed by an Inspector general who was responsible for the technical and tactical training of the Army Air service and of the other services related to the Air Service under the Ministry of War. It was composed of the following:

General Affairs (somobu)

- General Affairs (Administrative services) - personnel, finance, etc.
- Section 1. Air General Training (related with Air Training and Instruction Department)
- Section 2. Aircraft Research and Training Regulations (linked with Aircraft Research units and Tachikawa Air Arsenal)
- Section 3. Special Air Schools (related with Air Training and Instruction Department)

Secondary Bureaus

- Air Defense (AA units)
- Airfield Engineering
- Air Transport
- Air Chemical Warfare unit
- Air Intelligence and Communications

== List of Inspector Generals of Aviation ==
- 1938-1940 Hideki Tōjō
- 1940-1941 Yorimichi Suzuki
- 1941-1943 Kenji Doihara
- 1943-1944 Takeo Yasuda
- 1944-1945 Korechika Anami
