= Kumaichi Teramoto =

- 寺本 熊市
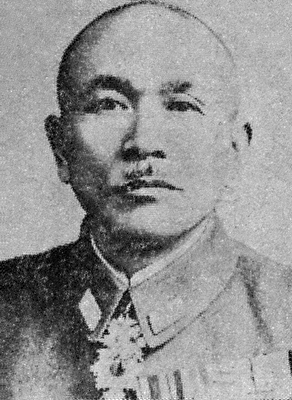
- Born: 1889; Japan
- Died: August 15, 1945 (aged 55–56); Japan
- Military career
- Allegiance: Empire of Japan
- Branch: Imperial Japanese Army
- Rank: Lieutenant General
- Commands: 2nd Air Division; 1st Air Army; 4th Air Army
- Conflicts: World War II; Bombing of Wewak

Kumaichi Teramoto (寺本 熊市, Teramoto Kumaichi; 1889 – August 15, 1945) was a Japanese lieutenant general during World War II.

== Career ==
Kumaichi Teramoto joined the Imperial Japanese Army in 1910, being commissioned into the infantry. In 1921, he graduated the Japanese War College and became a colonel in the IJA. Even though he had signed up for the ground forces, in 1933 he was given command of the 8th Air Regiment, and by 1940, he was a Major General commanding the 2nd Air Division in Manchukuo. When war broke out with the United States in December 1941, he held various air staff assignments. From May 1943 to July 1943 he commanded the 1st Air Army. In July 1943, he was assigned command of the 4th Air Army, which was virtually eliminated during the US Air Force's bombing of Wewak Island, where he was stationed. However, he was invited into the Army Aeronautical Department in the Ministry of War, and in 1944 he became the head of its Credit Bureau. The next year he became Acting Inspector-General of Army Aviation and in late 1945 he became the head of the entire organization. On August 15, when Japan surrendered to the United States after the nuclear bombing of Hiroshima and Nagasaki, Kumaichi Teramoto committed seppuku, the ritual suicide of Japan.
