= Joichiro Sanada =

Japanese general (1897–1957)

Jōichirō Sanada
- 真田 穣一郎
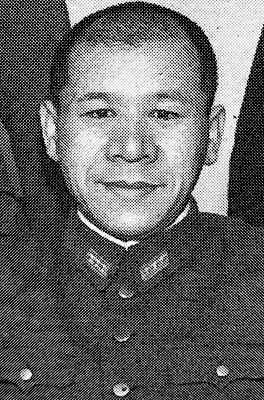
- Born: November 21, 1897; Bibai, Hokkaidō, Japan
- Died: August 3, 1957 (aged 59)
- Education: Imperial Japanese Army Academy; Army Staff College
- Military career
- Allegiance: Empire of Japan
- Branch: Imperial Japanese Army
- Service years: 1919–1945
- Rank: Major General
- Units: IJA 9th Infantry Regiment; Tokyo Defense Headquarters; Army Ministry; Japanese China Area Fleet; Imperial Japanese Army General Staff; Western District Army; IJA Second General Army
- Commands: IJA 86th Infantry Regiment
- Conflicts: Second Sino-Japanese War; World War II
- Other work: Military attaché Secretary to the Army Minister

Jōichirō Sanada (真田 穣一郎, Sanada Jōichirō; November 21, 1897 – August 3, 1957) was a major general in the Imperial Japanese Army in World War II.

== Biography ==
The son of a colonist/soldier in what is now Bibai, Hokkaidō, Sanada graduated from Sapporo South High School and the army cadet school in Sendai before being accepted into the 31st class of the Imperial Japanese Army Academy. He graduated in 1919 and served as a junior officer with the IJA 9th Infantry Regiment. He subsequently graduated from the 39th class of the Army Staff College in 1927. He was assigned to the Tokyo Defense Headquarters in 1929, and held a number of administrative posts at the Army Ministry from 1931.

Sanada was sent as a military attaché to Europe from October 1936. After his return to Japan in March 1937, he returned to the Army Ministry and was promoted to lieutenant colonel in November of the same year. From August 1938, he was Secretary to the Army Minister Seishiro Itagaki. Promoted to colonel in August 1939, he was assigned command of the IJA 86th Infantry Regiment. In January 1940, he was made Army liaison to the Japanese China Area Fleet during the Second Sino-Japanese War. His subsequent career was that of a bureaucrat within the Army Ministry. From February 1941, he was head of the Military Affairs Section of the Military Service Bureau. From December 1942, he was chief of the 2nd Bureau (Planning) within the Imperial Japanese Army General Staff. From October 1943, he was promoted to major general and head of the 1st Bureau (Operations) within the General Staff. In this role, he visited the front lines at Guadalcanal from December 17–25, 1942. Appalled at the losses suffered by the IJA 17th Army, and its lack of supplies, he reported to Imperial General Headquarters that the conditions were such that the campaign to take the island should be abandoned. He returned to Rabaul in early January armed with an Imperial decree and orders addressed to the Japanese Eighth Area Army to enforce the evacuation order.

Sanada returned to the Army Ministry in December 1944 as head of the Military Service Bureau. In March 1945, Sanada was attached to the staff of the Western District Army and became deputy chief-of-staff of the IJA Second General Army in April 1945. After the surrender of Japan, he remained on the staff of the Military Service Bureau, overseeing demobilization, until his retirement in December 1945.

A member of then Tōseiha political faction within the Army, Sanada was a strong supporter of Hideki Tōjō's rise to the position of prime minister in the Japanese government.
