= Takeo Yasuda =

- 安田 武雄
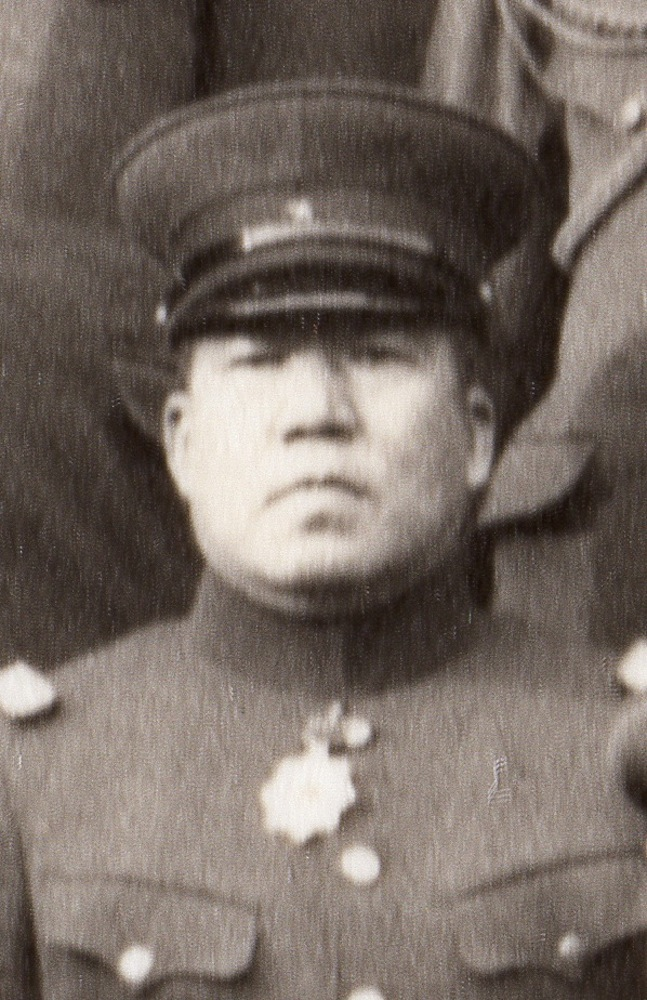
- Born: January 16, 1889; Okayama Prefecture, Japan
- Died: August 23, 1964 (aged 75)
- Military career
- Allegiance: Empire of Japan
- Branch: Imperial Japanese Army
- Service years: 1909 - 1945
- Rank: Lieutenant General
- Conflicts: World War II

Takeo Yasuda (安田 武雄, Yasuda Takeo; 16 January 1889 – 23 August 1964) was a lieutenant general in the Imperial Japanese Army. While serving as director of the Army's Aviation Technology Research Institute during World War II, he was a key figure in scientific and technological development for the Imperial Japanese Army Air Force, and also most notably for his involvement in the early development of a Japanese atom bomb during the early stages of the war.

== Early life and education ==
Yasuda was a native of Okayama prefecture. After attending military cadet schools in Osaka as a youth, he graduated from the 21st class of the Imperial Japanese Army Academy in 1909. He specialized primarily in engineering and observation balloons.

He graduated from artillery school in 1912 with honors, but was assigned to a signals (telegraph) company at his request. His technical abilities were soon recognized by his superiors, who sponsored him to attend the engineering department of Tokyo Imperial University from 1913 to 1916, where he specialized in electrical engineering.

== Career ==
On his graduation, Yasuda returned to regular military service as a chief Signals Officer in the Japanese China Garrison Army, and as an instructor at the Artillery School. He was then seconded by the Kwantung Army to the Inspectorate General of Military Training and was sent to Germany for further training. On his return to Japan, he was appointed Director of Research Department of the Army Signal School between 1932 and 1934. While assigned to the Ministry of the Army, he served as Chief of the Fortifications Section for Military Affairs in the Military Administration Bureau until 1937 when he became attached to the Army Aeronautical Technical Research Institute. Initially heading the 2nd Bureau, he was also Head of Field Aviation Ordnance before returning to the Institute as director of Army Aeronautical Technical Research, with the rank of major general by the end of the year. In 1937, he was promoted to the honorific title of Junior Fifth Court Rank.

During the late-1930s, Yasuda became interested in nuclear physics, specifically, the potential for large energy releases through nuclear fission, after reading scientific articles published in the United States and Germany. In April 1940, knowing that potential supplies of uranium were available in Korea, Lieutenant General Yasuda ordered Lieutenant Colonel Tatsusaburo Suzuki to prepare a report on the possibilities of developing an atomic weapon. The team put together by Suzuki included a number of scientists who had worked previously with Niels Bohr or Ernest Lawrence. Receiving a favorable report in December, Yasuda passed on this information to the Japan Physical and Chemical Research Institute who in turn assigned the project to nuclear physicist Yoshio Nishina. However, his proposals to produce a weapon were reduced to a search project due to the wartime constraints on Japanese resources.

== Later life and death ==
Between 1942 and 1944, Yasuda was commander of the Tokyo-based IJA 1st Air Army, head of the Army Aeronautical Department and Inspectorate General of Aviation before being relieved of duty in March 1944. Serving as a member of the Supreme War Council during the final years of the war, Yasuda also returned to command of the IJN 1st Air Army as part of the preparations for the final defense of the Japanese home islands against Allied invasion; however, he retired shortly before the war's end. He died in 1964.
