= Organization of the Kwantung Army =

Organizational structure of the Kwantung Army

Organization of the Kwantung Army which was an army group of the Imperial Japanese Army of Japan.

The following are commanders and units of the Japanese army which was stationed in the Kwantung peninsula of Manchuria from 1910 to 1945.

== Chiefs of Kwantung Army Staff ==
- Hikosaburo Hata: Chief of Staff Kwantung Army, Manchuria
- Heitarō Kimura:- Chief of Staff, Kwantung Army
- Jo Iimura:- Chief of Staff, Kwantung Army
- Kanji Ishiwara:- Chief of Staff, Kwantung Army
- Koiso Kuniaki:- General, Chief of Staff, Kwantung Army
- Toshizō Nishio:- Chief of Staff, Kwantung Army
- Rensuke Isogaya:- Chief of Staff, Kwantung Army
- Hideki Tōjō:- Chief of Staff, Kwantung Army

== Deputy Chief of Kwantung Army Staff ==
- Kitsuju Ayabe:- Deputy Chief of Staff, Kwantung Army (MajGen)
- Hitoshi Imamura:- Deputy Chief of Staff, Kwantung Army
- Seichiro Itagaki:- Deputy-Chief of Staff, same army
- Yasuji Okamura:- Deputy Chief of Staff, Kwantung Army
- Hitoshi Imamura: Deputy Chief of Staff Kwantung Army, Manchuria
- Kanji Ishiwara: Deputy Chief of Staff Kwantung Army, Manchuria

== Officers attached to Kwantung Army HQ ==
- Hatazō Adachi:- Attached to HQ, Kwantung Army
- Kenji Doihara:- Attached to HQ, Kwantung Army (MajGen)
- Kiichiro Higuchi:- Attached to HQ, Kwantung Army (MajGen)
- Harukichi Hyakutake:- Attached to HQ, Kwantung Army
- Masatane Kanda:- Attached to Kwantung Army HQ, Officer, Kwantung Army HQ
- Renya Mutaguchi:- Assigned to Kwantung Army HQ (MajGen)
- Hidemitsu Nakano:- HQ, Kwantung Army
- Takuma Shimoyama:- Attached to Kwantung Army
- Jun Ushiroku:- Attached to Kwantung Army HQ
- Isamu Yokoyama:- Attached to Kwantung Army HQ
- Shizuo Yokoyama:- (Colonel), assigned to Kwantung Army HQ
- Seishirō Itagaki:- Attached to same army (MajGen)

== Kwantung Army Railroad Service Commanders ==
- Hatazō Adachi:- Commander, Kwantung Army Railroad Command
- Shizuo Yokoyama:- Member, Railway Sector HQ, Kwantung Army, Commander, same Sector HQ

== Officers attached to Kwantung Government-General Service ==
- Sadao Araki:- Officer, Kwantung Government-General
- Koiso Kuniaki:- Army Staff Officer, Kwantung Government
- Jun Ushiroku:- Assigned to Kwantung Government-General

== Members of Kwantung Army Staff ==
- Kitsuju Ayabe:- Staff Officer, Kwantung Army, engaged in Chahar area operation
- Takushiro Hattori:- Staff Officer (Operations), Kwantung Army Headquarters (LtCol)
- Kanji Ishiwara:- Staff Officer, Kwantung Army
- Seishirō Itagaki:- Staff Officer, Kwantung Army
- Torashirō Kawabe:- Staff Officer (Operations; Intelligence), Kwantung Army
- Seiichi Kita:- Staff Officer, Kwantung Army
- Takeshi Mori:- Staff Officer, Kwantung Army
- Akira Mutō:- staff officer, Kwantung Army
- Sōsaku Suzuki:- Staff Officer, Kwantung Army
- Sinichi Tanaka:- Staff Officer, Kwantung Army
- Kioji Tominaga:- Staff Officer, Kwantung Army
- Masanobu Tsuji:- Staff Officer (Operations), Kwantung Army (Major), during Nomonhan Incident
- Rikichi Tsukada:- Staff Officer, Kwantung Army

== Kwantung Army Commanders (regular Army) ==
- Kōtoku Satō:- during Nomonhan Incident in 1939 he led the 2nd Sector Unit, 8th Border Garrison Unit (Hailar). Then a Major General, he replaced the wounded commanding general of the 23rd Infantry' Group on the Nomonhan battle front
- Michitarō Komatsubara:- Chief of 23d Division, and Japanese Commander in Nomonhan Incident
- Kitsuju Ayabe:- Chief of Staff, First Area Army (Manchuria), Kwantung Army, North China Detachment, Staff Officer, Third Army (Manchuria)
- Jo Iimura:- Commanding General, Fifth Army (Manchuria)
- Kenzo Kitano:- Hunchun Garrison Commander (Manchuria)
- Seiichi Kita:- Commanding General, First Area Army (Manchuria)
- Masutaro Nakai:- Commander assigned to Manchuria Independent Garrison Unit
- Korechika Anami:- Second Area Army Commander (Qiqihar, Manchuria)
- Nobuyoshi Obata:- Chief of Staff, Forty-fourth Army (Manchuria)
- Jun Ushiroku:- Third Area Army Commander, Manchuria
- Otozō Yamada:- 12th Division Commander (Dongning, Manchuria), Commanding General, Third Army (Mudanjiang, Manchuria)
- Isamu Chō: Commanding Officer 74th Regiment, Manchuria
- Noritsune Shimizu:- Lieutenant General, commander of Fifth Army (Mudanjiang)
- Keisaku Murakami:- Commander in Third Army (Yanji)
- Mikio Uemura:- Chief in Fourth Army (Qiqihar)
- Shōjirō Iida:- Commander of Thirtieth Army (Changchun)
- Yoshio Hongo:- Forty-Four Army (Liaoyuan)
- Kioji Tominaga:- 139th Division Commander (organized in Manchuria)
- Tomoyuki Yamashita:- Led First Area Army (with HQ in Mudanjiang)
- Yoshio Kozuki:- Commanded Second Army (Yanji)
- Jo Iimura: General Officer Commanding 5th Army, Manchuria
- Shin Yoshida:- Led Mechanized Army with HQ in Sipingjie
- Kitsuju Ayabe: Deputy Chief of Staff 3rd Army, Manchuria, Chief of Staff Kwantung Army and Chief of Staff 1st Area Army, Manchuria
- Shōjirō Iida: General Officer Commanding 30th Army, Manchuria and General Officer Commanding 20th Army, Manchuria
- Masaki Honda: General Officer Commanding 8th Division, Manchuria
- Tamio Iwasaki: General Officer Commanding 111th Division, Manchuria
- Torajiro Iwai: General Officer Commanding 108th Division, Manchuria
- Sadao Inoue: General Officer Commanding 14th Division, Manchuria
- Shunkichi Ikeda: General Officer Commanding 35th Division, Manchuria
- Yoshio Hongo: General Officer Commanding 62nd Division, Manchuria and General Officer Commanding 44th Army, Manchuria
- Hidezo Hitomi: General Officer Commanding 12th Division, Manchuria
- Mamoru Hara: General Officer Commanding 9th Division, Manchuria
- Koichi Abe: General Officer Commanding 107th Division, Manchuria
- Shojikiro Amaya: General Officer Commanding 40th Division, Manchuria
- Tatsumi Amamiya: General Officer Commanding 24th Division, Manchuria
- Keiichi Arikawa: Commanding Officer Infantry Group 62nd Division, Manchuria

== Kwantung Army Commander of Engineer Unit ==
- Shozo Hirano: Commanding Officer 2nd Engineer Unit, Manchuria

== Commander of 1st Special Tank Company in Harbin (1932) and Rehe (1933) ==
- Captain Hyakutake:- Commander of 1st Special Tank Company during Harbin fight (Manchurian Incident) in 1932 and Rehe battle in 1933.

== Commander of Yasuoka Task Force (armored group) in Nomonhan Incident (1939) ==
- Yasuoka Masaomi:- Commander of Yasuoka Task Force. Between your units stayed the 3rd Tank Regiment, led by Colonel Yoshimaru and 4th Tank Regiment led for Colonel Tamada

== Commander of 2nd Tank Group (Division) (Manchukuo) ==
- Tasuku Okada:- Commander, 2nd Tank Group (Division) "Geki", Manchukuo

== Commander of 1st Tank Brigade and 1st Armored Division ==
- Koreo Hosomi: Commanding Officer 1st Tank Brigade, Manchuria
- Toshimoto Hoshinato: General Officer Commanding 1st Armored Division, Manchuria

== Commander of 1st Garrison Unit of Kwantung Army ==
- Yoshio Ishino: Commanding Officer 1st Garrison Unit, Manchuria

== Chief of Staff, Kwantung Defense Army ==
- Nobuyoshi Obata:- Kwantung Army, Chief of Staff, Kwantung Defense Army
- Tomoyuki Yamashita:- Commanding General, Kwantung Army Defense Army
- Nobuyushi Muto: Commander in Chief Kwantung Army Defense Army

== Kwantung Army Commander-in-Chief ==
- Yoshinori Shirakawa: Commander in Chief Kwantung Army
- Kenachi Ueda: Commander in Chief Kwantung Army
- Taka Hishikari: Commander in Chief Kwantung Army
- Shigeru Honjō:- Commander of Kwantung Army
- Yoshitake Muraoka:- Commander of Kwantung Army
- Nobuyushi Muto: Commander in Chief Kwantung Army
- Senjuro Hayashi:- Commander of Kwantung Army
- Jirō Minami:- Commanding General, Kwantung Army
- Koiso Kuniaki:- Commander of Kwantung Army
- Kenkichi Ueda:- Commander of Kwantung Army
- Yoshijirō Umezu:- Commanding General, Kwantung Army, Commander-in-Chief, same army
- Otozō Yamada:- Commander-in-Chief, Kwantung Army

== Kwantung Army Commander of Port Arthur ==
- Saburo Ando: Commandant of Port Arthur

== Quartermaster-General Kwantung Army ==
- Lieutenant-General Furuno: Quartermaster-General Kwantung Army, Manchuria

== Commander of Kempeitai units, Kwantung Army ==
- Keisuke Fujie:- Chief, General Affairs Bureau, Military Police, HQ, Kwantung Army, Commander, Kwantung Army Military Police
- Shizuichi Tanaka:- Commander, Kwantung Army Military Police Units
- Hideki Tōjō:- Commanding General, Military Police, Kwantung Army
- Saburo Shimomura:- General of Japanese Gendarmerie section, Kempeitai detachment in Xinjing

== Kwantung Army Chief of Manchu Secret Police ==
- Toranosuke Hashimoto: Commanding Officer Manchu Secret Police, Xinjing, Manchuria (as branch of Kempeitain Intelligence in Manchukuo)

== Kwantung Army experts in Strike South planning ==
- Yoshihide Hayashi, Chief of Staff Unit 82 (Strike South planning), Manchuria
- Isamu Chō, Vice Chief of Staff Unit 82 (Strike South planning), Manchuria

== Commander in Kwantung Special Intelligence Service ==
- Prince Tsuneyoshi Takeda:- Occult Commander-in-Chief of Japanese Secret Services in Manchukuo; also Imperial Family Liaison with Kwantung Army and Kempeitai Intelligence Services in land
- Torashirō Kawabe:- Staff Officer (Operations; Intelligence), Kwantung Army
- Kingoro Hashimoto:- Chief, Special Service Agency, Hailar, Kwantung Army
- Michitarō Komatsubara:- Chief of the Special Service Agency at Harbin, Kwantung Army
- Koiso Kuniaki:- concurrently Chief, Special Service Department, Kwantung Army
- Nobuyoshi Obata:- Chief, Harbin Special Intelligence Agency, Kwantung Army
- Tadashi Hanaya: Head of Special Services Agency Kwantung Army
- Seikichi Hyakatuke: Head Harbin Special Services Agency, Manchuria
- Kenji Doihara: Head Special Service Agency Kwantung Army
- Shun Akifusa Chief of military Mission in Harbin and political adviser to the white Russian political groups in same city
- Genzo Yanagita head of the Japanese military mission in Harbin
- Kenji Ishikawa head of a sabotage group of that mission
- Yutaka Takeoka intelligence officer and head of the Dairen military mission
- Saburo Asada head of the 2nd (Intelligence) department of the staff of the Kwantung Army
- Tamaki Kumazaki deputy chief of intelligence of Kwantung Army
- Hiroki Nohara deputy chief of Kwantung Army Intelligence
- Yoshio Itagaki deputy chief of Kwantung Army Intelligence and son of Seishiro Itagaki, war minister from 1938–1939
- Norihiro Yasue, Army officer, author of the Fugu Plan
- Koreshige Inuzuka, Navy officer, co-author of the Fugu Plan
- Konstantin Vladimirovich Rodzaevsky, White Russian anticommunist leader
- General Kislitsin, another White Russian anticommunist chief
- Genrikh Lyushkov, ex-Soviet Far East NKVD defector, adviser to Kwantung Army

== Commanders of the Imperial Japanese Army Air Service forces in the Kwantung Army ==
- Torashirō Kawabe:- Commanding General, 7th Air Brigade (Manchuria), Commanding General, Second Air Army (Manchuria)
- Captain Kamata:- commander of Kwantung Army Hane Air Unit

== Air Squadrons of Kwantung Army and Manchukuoan Air Force ==
=== Kwantung Army Air units ===
- 2nd Air Division
- 2nd Air Brigade
- 8th Air Brigade
- 9th Air Brigade
- 13th Air Brigade
- 29th Air Brigade
- 28th Independent Regiment

=== Combat Units ===
- 15th Sentai
- 104th Sentai
- 25th Sentai
- 81st Sentai
- Hane Air Unit
- 5th Sentai (with base in Hebei, fighting against Soviets probably in Chahar, Mengjiang area)

=== Training Units (also was operative used in combat) ===
- 101st Sentai
- 4th Sentai
- 13th Sentai
- 22nd Sentai
- 23rd Sentai
- 26th Sentai
- 42nd Sentai
- 24th Sentai
- 5th Sentai

=== Manchoukouan Air Units ===
- 1st Air Group
- 2nd Air Group
- 3rd Air Group
- Training Air Group

== Chief and Instructors in Kwantung Army Training Schools ==
- Kenzo Kitano:- Commandant, Kungchuling Army School (Manchuria)
- Kioji Tominaga:- Commandant, Kungchuling Army Tank School (Manchuria)

== Operative units in Kwantung Army Training Schools ==
- 1st Tank Army (Main Tank instruction unit)
- 23rd Tank Regiment (Practice Tank unit)
- 24th Tank Regiment (Practice Tank unit)

== Japanese Official Ambassador to Manchukuo ==
- Jirō Minami:- Kwantung Army - concurrently Ambassador to Manchukuo
- Taka Hishikari:- Kwantung Army - Ambassador to Manchukuo
- Tadashi Hanaya:- Head, Japanese Military Mission Manchukuo
- Shun Akifusa:- Head, Harbin Military Mission

== Adviser in Manchukuoan Military Administration Bureau ==
- Takuma Shimoyama:-Headquarters-Adviser, Manchukuoan Military Administration Bureau

== Officers in Kwantung Frontier Guards detachment ==
- Shun Akifusa: Commanding Officer 4th Border Garrison Unit Manchuria
- N.Imoto:- Kwantung Army Frontier Guard officer in service in Hiriyahari detachment HQ, no far less of frontier point N°25 in upper lands of Usachi River, in front at Komissarsky, in Soviet Side, Manchu-Russian frontier
- Captain Ohki:- Commander, Artillery Unit/15th Border Guard Unit in Kotou Fortress located near Ussuri River in the Soviet-Manchurian border
- Kōtoku Satō:- During Nomonhan Incident in 1939 he led the 2nd Sector Unit, 8th Border Garrison Unit (Hailar, Hsingan)
- Ilasebe Riei:- Commander, 8th Border Guards unit

== Participants in Changkufeng Incident (1938) ==
- Kōtoku Satō COL - During the Zhanggufeng Incident in 1938, commanded the 75th Infantry Regiment

== Participants in Nomonhan Incident (1939) ==
- Aoyagi Kinichiro CPT - Commander, 5th Company, 2/28th Battalion
- Azuma Shoji LTC - Acting Commander, 71st Infantry Regiment
- Azuma Yaozo LTC - Commander, Reconnaissance Element, 23d Division
- Ilasebe Riei COL - Commander, 8th Border Guards
- Hattori Takushiro LTC - Staff Officer, Kwantung Army
- Kajikawa Romiji MAJ - Commander, 2/28th Battalion
- Komatsubara Michitaro LTG - Commander, 23rd Infantry Division
- Morita Tetsuji COL - Commander, 71st Infantry Regiment
- Muranaka Shoichi 1LT - Aide-de-camp, Commander, 2/28th Battalion
- Nagano Eizo COL - Commander, 71st Infantry Regiment
- Nakano Tomizo 2LT - Commander, 1st Platoon, 6th Company, 2/28th Bn
- Nishinome Shogoro 2LT - Commander, 2nd Platoon, 6th Company, 2/28th Bn
- Ogisu Rippei LTG - Commander, 6th Army
- Sadakaji Tetsuo 1LT - Commander, Machine Can Company, 2/28th Btn
- Saito Kiyokichi 1LT - Commander, 7th Company, 2/28th Btn
- Sano Shoji 2LT - Commander, id Platoon, 5th Company, 2/28th Btn
- Sawada Tetsuro 1LT - Commander, Weapons Platoon, 5th Company, 2/ 28th
- Sumi Shinichiro COL - Commander, 26th Infantry Regiment Relieved
- Suzuki Katsushi 2LT - Commander, 3rd Platoon, 7th Company, 2/28th Ed
- Tahara Tamotsu 2LT - Commander, 1st Platoon, 5th Company, 2/28th Bn
- Tokushima Masao 2LT - Commander, 2nd Platoon, 7th Company, 2/28th Bn
- Tsuji Kiichi CPT - Commander, 6th Company, 2/28th Bn
- Tsuji Masanobu MAJ - Staff Officer, Kwantung Army
- Ueda Kenachi GEN - Commander, Kwantung Army
- Yamagata Takemitsu COL - Commander, 64th Infantry Regiment
- Yasuoka Masaomi LTG - Commander, Yasuoka Task Force
- Colonel Yoshimaru - Commander of 3rd Tank Regiment, in the Yasuoka Task Force
- Colonel Tamada - Commander of 4th Tank Regiment in the Yasuoka Task Force
- Col. Ise - Commander of 13th Field Artillery Regiment
- Major Gen. Hata - Commander of 3rd Field Heavy Artillery Brigade HQ
- Col. Mishima - Commander of 1st Field Heavy Artillery Regiment
- Col. Takatsukasa - Commander of 7th Independent Field Heavy Artillery Regiment
- Lt. Col. Someya - Commander of Muling Heavy Artillery Regiment
- Col. Miyao - Commander of 1st Independent Field Artillery Regiment
- 1st Lt. Hitoshi Asano - twenty-two-victory IJAAF air ace against the Russians in Nomonhan

== Organization of Manchukuoan Fortresses ==
Referring to defensive fortifications on the Russian-Manchu frontier line, this organization was led from Xinjing Fortress Command in the Manchoukoan capital, under the command of the Kwantung Army Commander.

The Kwantung Army laid plans for a border defense system in 1934, but construction work did not begin until 1935. During the early period (to 1938), four zones were fortified in East Manchuria, plus three in the north and one in the west.

- Manzhouli fortified district
- Kotou fortified district
- Fuyuan fortified district
- Sungari fortified district and Japanese Army Sungari Flotilla
- Xinjing fortified district/defense center
- Tuntsiang defense center
- Fuqing fortified district with five permanent emplacements, a munitions depot and six mortar batteries
- Sun’u fortified district with 20,000 Japanese officers and soldiers
- Sanjiang fortified district

== Kwantung Fortifications ==
These fortresses were in direct command of the Kwantung Army in the territory; also included Japanese Navy detachments in Dairen and Ryojun naval bases.

- Port Arthur fortified district (now Liaoshun)
- Dairen fortified district (now Dalian)
- Ryojun fortified district (now Lushun)

== Ryojun Naval Station (Kwantung) ==
- H.Ukita Commander of Ryojun Naval Guard District and Station; also the Japanese Navy's highest authority in Kwantung area, responsible for these units:
  - Ryojun Naval Base HQ
  - Ryojun Signal Unit
  - Ryojun Base Defense Unit
  - Ryojun Base Military Police
  - Ryojun Naval Barracks Service
  - Ryojun Port Duty Unit

== 50th Minesweeper Division (Ryojun) ==
- R.Kurosaki Commander of 50th Minesweeper Division (Ryojun); under his leadership were these units:
  - Shanan Maru N 16
  - ? Maru

== Commanders and members of Unit 731 ==
- Shirō Ishii:-was founder of Unit 731 in Manchukuo
- Ryōichi Naitō
- Masaji Kitano
- Yoshio Shinozuka
- Barone Ottavio

== Commander and members of Unit 100 ==
- Yujiro Wakamatsu:-commander of Unit 100 in Changchung
- Kazuo Mitomo
- Officer Matsui
- Officer Hirazakura
- Officer Kuwabara

== Others similar units under Japanese Army Command ==
- Unit 516
- Unit 1855
- Unit 2646
- Unit 8604
- Unit 9420
- Unit Ei 1644

== Operative units in Kwantung Theatre Army ==
January 1937 to July 1937:

- 1st, 2nd, 4th, 12th Divisions
- 1st, 11th Independent Mixed Brigades
- 1st, 2nd, 3rd, 4th, 5th Independent Garrisons
- the Cavalry Group
- IJA 3rd Cavalry Brigade
- Kwantung Army Flight Group
  - 10th, 11th, 12th, 15th, 16th Air Regiments

=== Direct Reporting Units ===
- 10th Infantry Division
- 28th Infantry Division
- 29th Infantry Division
- 23rd Tank Regiment
- Botanko Artillery Regiment
- 3rd Signal Regiment
- Kwantung Air Brigade

=== 3rd Army ===
- 9th Infantry Division
- 12th Infantry Division
- 57th Infantry Division
- 1st Tank Brigade
- 7th Artillery Command
- 5th Separate Engineer Regiment
- 9th Separate Engineer Regiment
- 27th Separate Engineer Regiment
- 33rd Truck Brigade
- 49th Truck Brigade
- 66th Truck Brigade
- 67th Truck Brigade

=== 4th Army ===
- 1st Infantry Division
- 44th Truck Brigade
- 68th Truck Brigade
- 5th Army
- 11th Infantry Division
- 24th Infantry Division
- 2nd Armored Brigade
- 8th Artillery Brigade
- 7th Separate Engineer Regiment
- 22nd Separate Engineer Regiment
- 23rd Separate Engineer Regiment
- 69th Truck Regiment
- 70th Truck Regiment

=== 6th Army ===
- 14th Infantry Division
- 23rd Infantry Division
- 4th Signal Regiment
- 47th Truck Brigade
- 20th Army
- 8th Infantry Division
- 25th Infantry Division
- 5th Artillery Brigade
- 34th Truck Brigade
- 64th Truck Brigade

=== 1st Armored Group (Division) ===
- Nickname: "Taku" (Development)

Formed in December 1941 in Poli, Manchuria. Renamed a Division in June 1942.

- 1st Tank Regiment
- 3rd Tank Regiment
- 5th Tank Regiment
- 9th Tank Regiment

=== 2nd Armored Group (Division) ===
- Nickname: "Geki" (Hit)

Formed in December 1941 in Mutangchiang, Manchuria. Renamed a Division in June 1942.

- 6th Tank Regiment
- 7th Tank Regiment
- 10th Tank Regiment
- 11th Tank Regiment
