= Kwantung Army =

Imperial Japanese Army unit and de facto rulers of Manchukuo

- Japanese: 関東軍; Kantō-gun
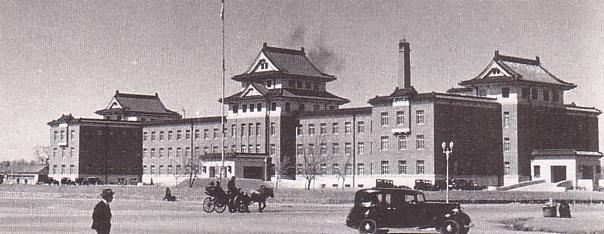
- Kwantung Army headquarters in Xinjing, Manchukuo
- Active: April 1919 – August 1945
- Country: Empire of Japan
- Allegiance: Emperor of Japan
- Branch: Imperial Japanese Army
- Type: General Army
- Size: 300,000 (1940); 763,000 (1941); 713,000 (1945)
- Garrison/HQ: Ryojun, Kwantung Leased Territory (1906–1932); Xinjing, Manchukuo (1932–1945)
- Nicknames: Toku (德兵團, Toku heidan), "Virtue"
- Engagements: Huanggutun Incident; Invasion of Manchuria; First Battle of Hopei; Pacification of Manchukuo; Soviet–Japanese border conflicts; Battle of Lake Khasan; Battle of Khalkhin Gol; Second Sino-Japanese War; Battle of Beiping-Tianjin; Operation Chahar; Second World War; Soviet invasion of Manchuria

Kwantung Army headquarters, Xinjing, Manchukuo
- Location within China
- Coordinates: 43.894°N 125.316°E

Kwantung Army

Chinese name
- Traditional Chinese: 關東軍
- Simplified Chinese: 关东军
- Literal meaning: Army East of the (Shanhai) Pass
Transcriptions
Standard Mandarin
- Hanyu Pinyin: Guāndōngjūn
- Wade–Giles: Kuan^{1}-tung^{1} Chün^{1}
Yue: Cantonese
- Yale Romanization: Gwāan dūng gwān
- Jyutping: Gwaan^{1} dung^{1} gwan^{1}

Korean name
- Hangul: 관동군
- Hanja: 關東軍
Transcriptions
- Revised Romanization: Gwandonggun
- McCune–Reischauer: Kwandonggun

Japanese name
- Kanji: 関東軍
- Kana: かんとうぐん
Transcriptions
- Revised Hepburn: Kantō-gun

The Kwantung Army (Japanese: 関東軍, Hepburn: Kantō-gun) was a general army of the Imperial Japanese Army from 1919 to 1945.

The Kwantung Army was formed in 1906 as a security force for the Kwantung Leased Territory and South Manchurian Railway Zone after the Russo-Japanese War of 1904–1905 and expanded into an army group during the interwar period to support Japanese interests in China, Manchuria, and Mongolia. The Kwantung Army became the most prestigious command in the Imperial Japanese Army, and many of its personnel won promotions to high positions in the Japanese military and civil government, including Hideki Tojo and Seishirō Itagaki. The Kwantung Army was largely responsible for the establishment and proxy control of the Japanese puppet-state of Manchukuo in Manchuria and functioned as one of the main Japanese fighting forces during the 1937–1945 Second Sino-Japanese War.

In August 1945 Soviet troops engaged the Kwantung Army during the Manchurian Strategic Offensive Operation. The Kwantung Army surrendered to the Soviets on 16 August 1945, the day after the surrender of Japan, and was subsequently dissolved.

The Kwantung Army perpetrated several war crimes during World War II, sponsoring Unit 731, which both carried out acts of biological warfare and performed unethical human experimentation on civilians and Allied prisoners of war.

== History ==
=== Formation ===
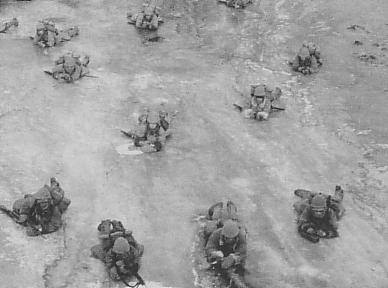
Kwantung Army on manoeuvres in 1941.

In 1895, Qing China granted the Kwantung Leased Territory, a valuable concession territory on the Liaodong Peninsula, to the Empire of Japan in the Treaty of Shimonoseki after their victory in the First Sino-Japanese War. The term "Kwantung" (traditional Chinese: 關東; simplified Chinese: 关东; pinyin: Guāndōng; Wade–Giles: Kwan^{1}-tung^{1}) means "east of Shanhaiguan", a guarded pass west of Manchuria, which was rendered in Japanese as "Kantō". The Russian Empire had a particular interest in Kwantung, being one of the few areas in the region with the potential to develop ice-free ports for its expansion in the Far East, and Qing authorities withdrew the lease from the Japanese following the Triple Intervention, only weeks after it had been granted. Kwantung was leased to Russia in 1898, becoming Russian Dalian (Дальний) and developing the territory into a thriving trade port. The Russo-Japanese War was fought between Russia and Japan from 1904 to 1905 over their rival imperial ambitions in Manchuria and Korea. Japanese victory led to the Qing returning the lease of Russian Dalian (re-establishing the Kwantung Leased Territory) and Japan gaining influence in the areas adjacent to the South Manchurian Railway.

The Kwantung Garrison was established in 1906 to defend this territory and originally was composed of an infantry division and a heavy siege artillery battalion, supplemented with six independent garrison battalions as railway guards deployed along the South Manchurian Railway Zone, for a total troop strength of 14,000 men. It was headquartered in Port Arthur (known as Ryojun in Japanese) and was administered as a department by the Kwantung Government-general, and the governor-general served concurrently as its commander. In 1919 the Kwantung Government general was replaced by separate civilian and military administration, the Kwantung Agency for Civilian Operations, and the Kwantung Army command. In the highly politicized Imperial Japanese Army of the 1920s and 1930s, the Kwantung Army was a stronghold of the radical "Imperial Way Faction" (Kōdōha), and many of its senior leaders overtly advocated political change in Japan through the violent overthrow of the civilian government to bring about a Shōwa Restoration, with a reorganization of society and the economy under Kokkashugi. They also advocated a more aggressive, expansionist foreign policy regarding the Asian mainland. Members or former members of the Kwantung Army were active in numerous coup attempts against the civilian government, culminating with the February 26 Incident of 1936, where the Kōdōha faction was dissolved.

=== Independent actions ===
Although the Kwantung Army was nominally subordinate to the Imperial General Headquarters and the senior staff at the Army General Staff located in Tokyo, its leadership often acted in direct violation of the orders from mainland Japan without suffering any consequences. Conspirators within the junior officer corps of the Kwantung Army plotted and carried out the assassination of Manchurian warlord Zhang Zuolin in the Huanggutun Incident of 1928. Afterward, the Kwantung Army leadership engineered the Mukden Incident and the subsequent invasion of Manchuria in 1931, in a massive act of insubordination (gekokujō) against the express orders of the political and military leadership based in Tokyo.

Presented with the fait accompli, Imperial General Headquarters had little choice but to follow up on the actions of the Kwantung Army with reinforcements in the subsequent Pacification of Manchukuo. The success of the campaign meant that the insubordination of the Kwantung Army was rewarded rather than punished. In 1932, the Kwantung Army was the main force responsible for the foundation of Manchukuo, the puppet state of Japan located in Northeast China and Inner Mongolia. The Kwantung Army played a controlling role in the political administration of the new state as well as in its defense. With the Kwantung Army administering all aspects of the politics and economic development of the new state, this made the Kwantung Army's commanding officer equivalent to a governor-general, with the authority to approve or countermand any command from Puyi, the nominal Emperor of Manchukuo. As a testament to the Kwantung Army's control over the government of Manchukuo, the Commander-in-Chief of the Kwantung Army also served as the Japanese Ambassador of Manchukuo.

=== Second World War ===
After the campaign to secure Manchukuo, the Kwantung Army continued to fight in numerous border skirmishes with China as part of its efforts to create a Japanese-dominated buffer zone in Northern China. The Kwantung Army also fought in Operation Nekka during the preceding phase of the Second Sino-Japanese War, and various actions in Inner Mongolia to extend Japanese domination over portions of northern China and Inner Mongolia. When full-scale war broke out in the Marco Polo Bridge Incident in July 1937, its forces participated in the Battle of Beiping-Tianjin and Operation Chahar. Later, Kwantung forces supported the war in China from time to time.

However, by the late 1930s, the Kwantung Army's vaunted reputation was severely challenged during the Soviet–Japanese border conflicts that Japan had fought against the Soviet Union in northern Manchukuo since 1932. The Japanese force stalemated with the Soviet Union's Red Army in the Battle of Lake Khasan in 1938, and lost the decisive Battle of Nomonhan in 1939, during which time it sustained heavy casualties. After the "Nomonhan incident", the Kwantung Army was purged of its more insubordinate elements, as well as proponents of the Hokushin-ron ("Northward Advance") doctrine who urged that Japan concentrate its expansionist efforts on Siberia rather southward towards China and Southeast Asia.

The Kwantung Army was heavily augmented over the next few years, up to a strength of 700,000 troops by 1941, and its headquarters was transferred to the new Manchukuo capital of Xinjing. The Kwantung Army also oversaw the creation, training, and equipping of an auxiliary force, the Manchukuo Imperial Army. During this time, Prince Tsuneyoshi Takeda worked as a liaison officer between the Imperial House and the Kwantung Army. Although a source of constant unrest during the 1930s, the Kwantung Army remained remarkably obedient during the 1940s. As combat spread south into Central China and Southern China in the Second Sino-Japanese War, and with the outbreak of the Pacific War, Manchukuo was largely a backwater to the conflict. However, as the war situation began to deteriorate for the Imperial Japanese Army on all fronts, the large, well-trained, and well-equipped Kwantung Army could no longer be held in strategic reserve. Many of its front-line units were systematically stripped of their best units and equipment, which were sent south to fight in the Pacific War against the forces of the United States in the Pacific Islands or the Philippines. Other units were sent south into China for Operation Ichi-Go.

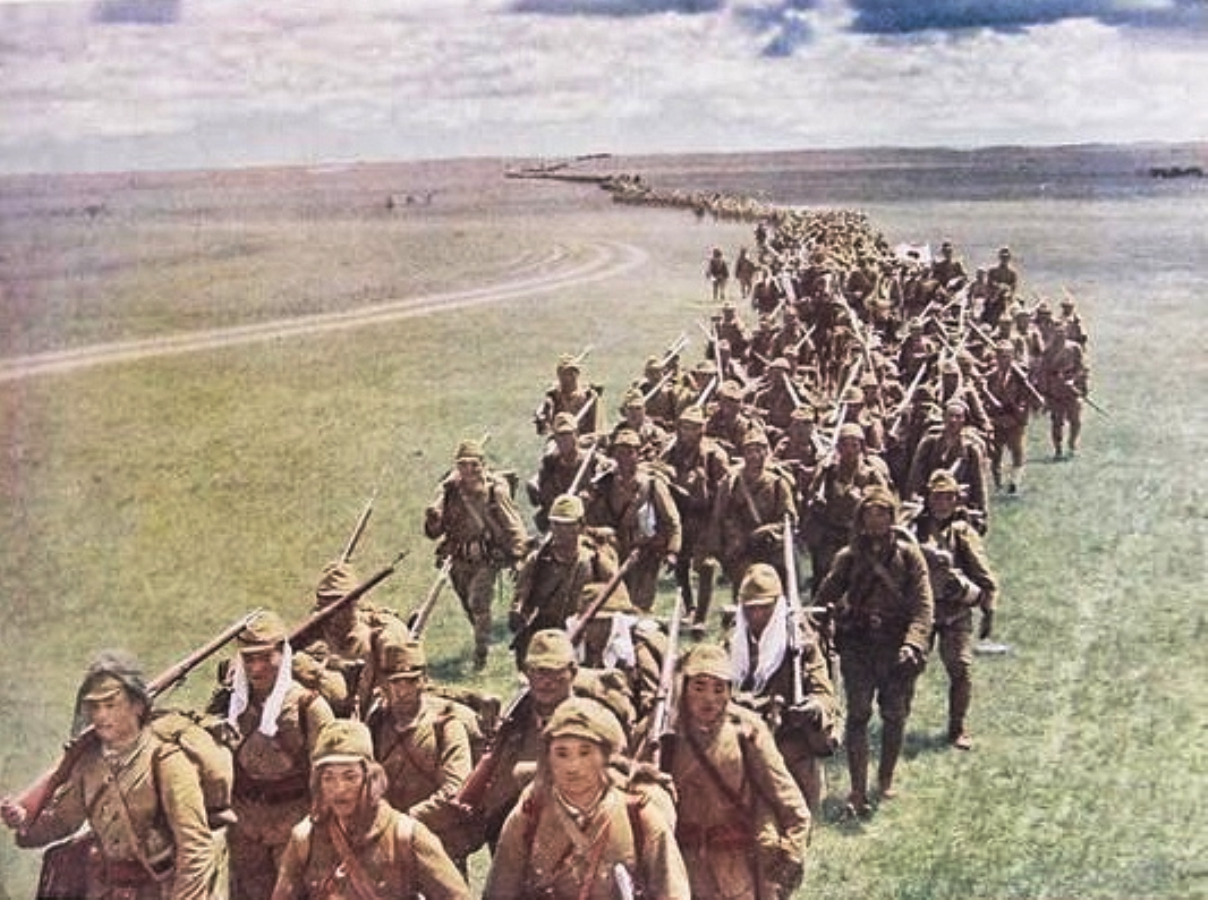
Kwantung Army in Mongolia during the Battle of Khalkhyn Gol, July 1939

Map of Japanese Hokushin-ron plans for a potential attack on the Soviet Union. Dates indicate the year that Japan gained control of the territory.

=== Surrender of the Kwantung Army ===
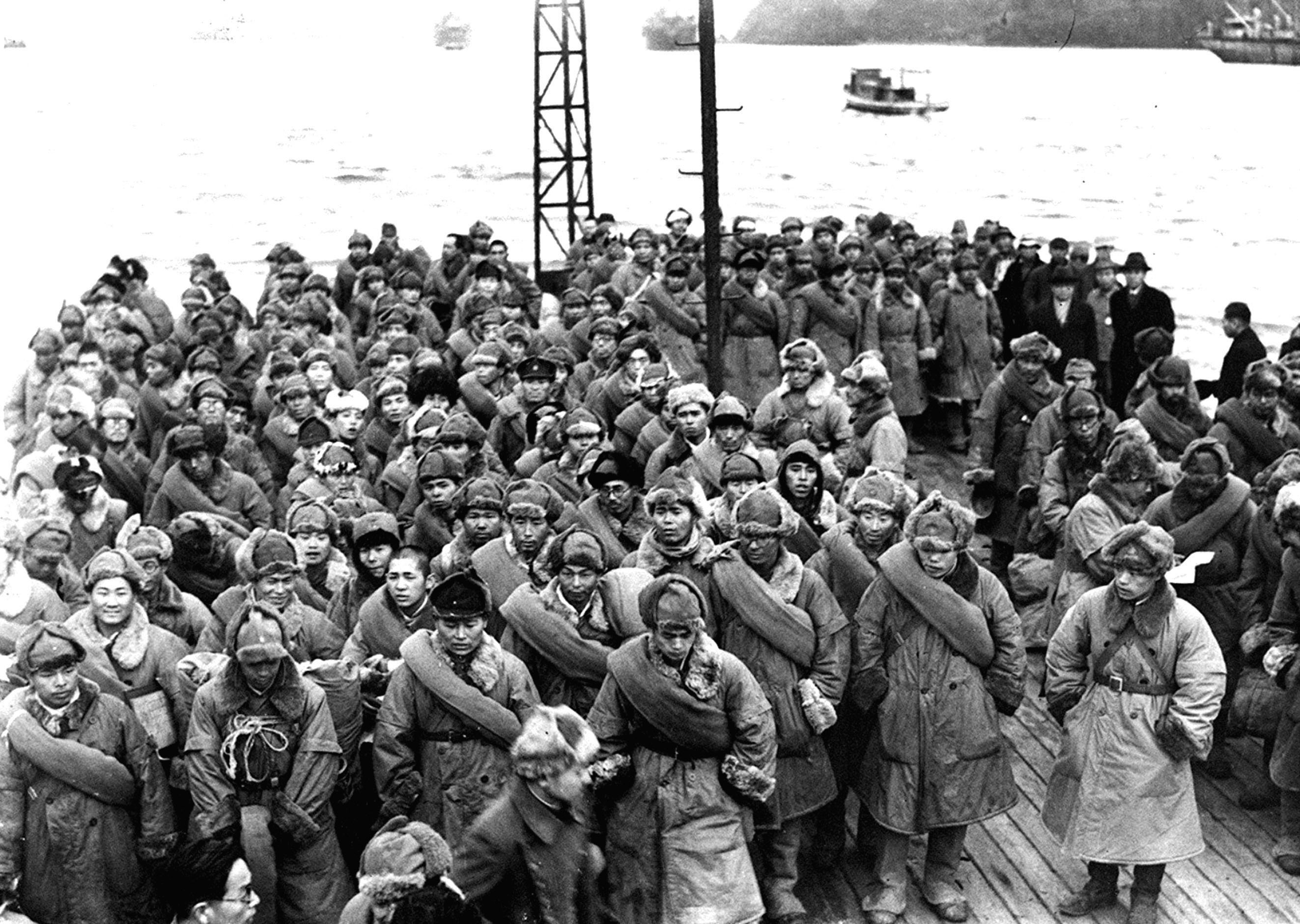
Repatriated Japanese soldiers returning from Siberia in 1946

By 1945, the Kwantung Army consisted of 713,000 personnel, divided into 31 infantry divisions, nine infantry brigades, two tank brigades, and one special purpose brigade. It possessed 1,155 light tanks, 5,360 guns, and 1,800 aircraft. The quality of troops had fallen drastically, as all the best men and materiel were siphoned off for use in other theaters. These forces were replaced by militia, draft levies, reservists, and cannibalized smaller units, all equipped with woefully outdated equipment. The Kwantung Army was also equipped with bacteriological weapons, prepared for use against Soviet troops (see Unit 731). The bulk of military equipment (artillery, tanks, aircraft) was developed in the 1930s, and very few of the soldiers had sufficient training or any real experience.

The Kwantung Army was outclassed and swiftly defeated in the Soviet invasion of Manchuria which began on 9 August 1945.

The final commanding officer of the Kwantung Army, General Otozō Yamada, ordered a surrender on August 16, 1945, one day after Emperor Hirohito announced the surrender of Japan in a radio announcement. Some Japanese divisions refused to surrender, and combat continued for the next few days. Marshal Hata received the "ultimatum to surrender" from Soviet General Georgii Shelakhov in Harbin on August 18, 1945. He was one of the senior generals who agreed with the decision to surrender, and on August 19, 1945, Hata met with Marshal Aleksandr Vasilevsky, but asked that he be stripped of his rank of Field Marshal in atonement for the Army's failures in the war.

The remnants of the Kwantung Army were either dead or on their way to Soviet prisoner-of-war camps. Over 500,000 Japanese prisoners of war were sent to work in Soviet labor camps in Siberia, Russian Far East, and Mongolia. They were largely repatriated, in stages, over the next five years, though some continued to be held well into the 1950s.

=== War crimes and trials ===
After the surrender of Japan, the Soviet Red Army discovered secret installations for experimenting with and producing chemical weapons and biological weapons of mass destruction centered around Secret Army Unit 731 and its subsidiaries. At these locations, the Kwantung Army was also responsible for some of the most infamous Japanese war crimes, including the operation of several human experimentation programs using live Chinese, American, and Russian civilians, and POWs, directed by Dr. Shirō Ishii.

Arrested by the American occupation authorities, Ishii and the 20,000 members of Unit 731 received immunity from prosecution of war crimes before the Tokyo tribunal of 1948, in exchange for germ warfare data based on human experimentation. On May 6, 1947, General Douglas MacArthur wrote to Washington that "additional data, possibly some statements from Ishii probably can be obtained by informing Japanese involved that information will be retained in intelligence channels and will not be employed as 'War Crimes' evidence". The deal was concluded in 1948. However, twelve members of Unit 731 and some members of the World War II leadership of the Kwantung Army were sentenced as war criminals by the Khabarovsk War Crime Trials, while others were taken into custody by the United States, and sentenced at the 1948 International Military Tribunal for the Far East in Tokyo. Among those sentenced to death were former generals Seishirō Itagaki, Iwane Matsui, Kenji Doihara, Hideki Tōjō, and Akira Mutō.

== List of commanders ==
=== Kwantung Army ===
==== Commanding officer ====
	Name	From	To
1	General Tachibana Kōichirō	1919	6 January 1921
2	General Misao Kawai	6 January 1921	10 May 1922
3	General Shinobu Ono	10 May 1922	10 October 1923
4	General Yoshinori Shirakawa	10 October 1923	28 July 1926
5	Field Marshal Baron Nobuyoshi Mutō	28 July 1926	26 August 1927
6	General Chotaro Muraoka	26 August 1927	1 July 1929
7	General Eitaro Hata	1 July 1929	31 May 1930
8	General Takashi Hishikari	3 June 1930	1 August 1931
9	General Shigeru Honjō	1 August 1931	8 August 1932
10	Field Marshal Baron Nobuyoshi Mutō	8 August 1932	27 July 1933
11	General Takashi Hishikari	29 July 1933	10 December 1934
12	General Jirō Minami	10 December 1934	6 March 1936
13	General Kenkichi Ueda	6 March 1936	7 September 1939
14	General Yoshijirō Umezu	7 September 1939	18 July 1944
14	General Otozō Yamada	18 July 1944	11 August 1945

==== Chief of Staff ====
	Name	From	To
1	Major General Matasuke Hamamo	12 April 1919	11 March 1921
2	Major General Kaya Fukuhara	11 March 1921	6 August 1923
3	Major General Akiharu Kawada	6 August 1923	2 December 1925
4	Major General Tsune Saito	2 December 1925	10 August 1928
5	Major General Koji Miyake	10 August 1928	8 August 1932
6	Lieutenant General Kuniaki Koiso	8 August 1932	5 March 1934
7	Lieutenant General Toshizo Nishio	5 March 1934	23 March 1936
8	Major General Seishirō Itagaki	23 March 1936	1 March 1937
9	Lieutenant General Hideki Tōjō	1 March 1937	30 May 1938
10	Lieutenant General Rensuke Isogai	18 June 1938	7 September 1939
11	Lieutenant General Jo Iimura	7 September 1939	22 October 1940
12	Lieutenant General Heitarō Kimura	22 October 1940	10 April 1941
13	Lieutenant General Teiichi Yoshimoto	10 April 1941	1 August 1942
14	Lieutenant General Yukio Kasahara	1 August 1942	7 April 1945
15	Lieutenant General Hikosaburo Hata	7 April 1945	11 August 1945

== See also ==
- Armies of the Imperial Japanese Army
- Japanese settlers in Manchuria
- Kantokuen – Planned World War II Japanese military campaign
- Yoshiko Kawashima – Qing dynasty royal and Japanese spy (1907–1948)
- Military history of Japan
- Organization of the Kwantung Army
- Zhongma Fortress – Japanese army prison camp
- Senbu
