= Russian Manchuria =

Russian Manchuria may refer to:

- Russian Dalian, territories in Manchuria (specifically in Northeast China) controlled by Russia in 1898–1905
- Outer Manchuria, territories now part of the Russia Far East, ceded by China to Russia in 1858-1860
