= Kwantung Leased Territory =

Japanese concession in northern China in 1895 and from 1905 to 1945

Coordinates: 39°10′N 121°45′E

Kwantung Leased Territory 關東州
- Leased territory of Japan
- 1905–1945
- Flag Crest

- Kwantung Leased Territory in dark green Neutral zone in striped light green

Anthem
- "Kimigayo"
- Capital: Dairen
- Government
- Governor
  - 1905–1912: Ōshima Yoshimasa (first)
  - 1944–1945: Otozō Yamada (last)
- Historical era: Century of humiliation
  - Triple Intervention: 23 April 1895
  - Treaty of Portsmouth: 5 September 1905
  - Surrender of Japan: 2 September 1945
Preceded by	Succeeded by
Russian Dalian	Soviet occupation of Manchuria

Kwantung Leased Territory

Chinese name
- Traditional Chinese: 關東州
- Simplified Chinese: 关东州
Transcriptions
Standard Mandarin
- Hanyu Pinyin: Guāndōng Zhōu
- Wade–Giles: Kuan^{1}-tung^{1} Chou^{1}

Japanese name
- Kanji: 關東州
- Kana: かんとうしゅう
- Shinjitai: 関東州
Transcriptions
- Romanization: Kantōshū

The Kwantung Leased Territory (traditional Chinese and Japanese: 關東州; ; pinyin: Guāndōng zhōu; Wade–Giles: Kuan^{1}-tung^{1}-chou^{1}; rōmaji: Kantō-shū) was a leased territory of the Empire of Japan in the Liaodong Peninsula from 1905 to 1945.

Japan first acquired Kwantung from the Qing Empire in perpetuity in 1895 in the Treaty of Shimonoseki after victory in the First Sino-Japanese War. Kwantung was located at the militarily and economically significant southern tip of the Liaodong Peninsula at the entrance of the Bohai Sea, and included the port city of Ryojun (Port Arthur/Lüshunkou). Japan lost Kwantung weeks later in the Triple Intervention and the Qing transferred the lease to the Russian Empire in 1898, who governed the territory as Russian Dalian and rapidly developed infrastructure and the city of Dairen (Dalniy/Dalian). Japan re-acquired the Kwantung lease from Russia in 1905 in the Treaty of Portsmouth after victory in the Russo-Japanese War, continued to rapidly develop the territory, and obtained extraterritorial rights known as the South Manchuria Railway Zone. Japan extended the lease with the Republic of China in the Twenty-One Demands and used Kwantung as a base to launch the Second Sino-Japanese War. The Kwantung Leased Territory ceased to exist following the Surrender of Japan in World War II in September 1945 when the Soviet Red Army began to administer the region until Kwantung and the Lüshun base was handed over to the People's Republic of China on 16 April 1955.

== Etymology ==
The name "Kwantung" (traditional Chinese: 關東; simplified Chinese: 关东; pinyin: Guāndōng; Wade–Giles: Kuan^{1}-tung^{1}) is a historical name for Manchuria that literally translates to "east of (Shanhai) Pass" (Manchuria was separated from the rest of China by the Great Wall, and Shanhai Pass was the main pass used to travel between the two). The peninsula extending from southern Manchuria (now called the Liaodong Peninsula) was therefore often called the "Guandong (Kwantung) Peninsula". The leased territory was located on this peninsula, so took its name from it.

In Japanese, Kwantung is pronounced Kantō and it is often referred to as Kantō-shū to avoid confusion with the Kantō region surrounding the capital Tokyo.

== History ==
In Qing dynasty China, the Liaodong Peninsula (simplified Chinese: 辽东半岛; traditional Chinese: 遼東半島; pinyin: Liáodōng Bàndǎo) was administratively part of Liaoning Province. In 1882, the Beiyang Fleet established a naval base and coaling station at Lüshunkou near the southern end of the peninsula.

The Empire of Japan occupied the region during the First Sino-Japanese War (1894–1895), and under the terms of the Treaty of Shimonoseki signed by Japan and China ending the war in April 1895, Japan gained full sovereignty of the area. However, within weeks, Germany, France and Russia pressured Japan to cede the territory back to China, in what was called the Triple Intervention.

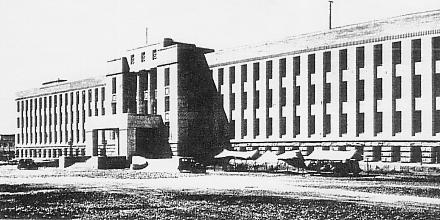
Kwantung Prefectural Office

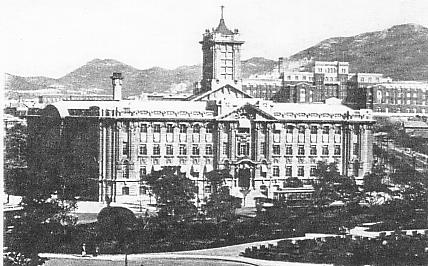
Dairen City Hall

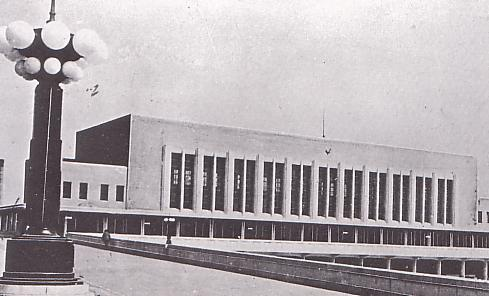
Dairen Station

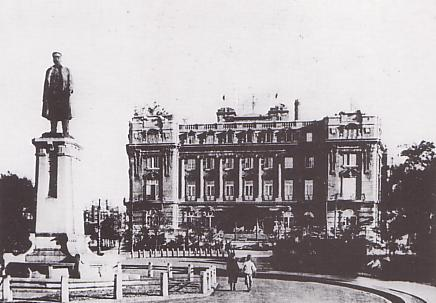
Dairen Yamato Hotel

In December 1897, Russian naval vessels entered Lüshunkou harbor, which they began to use as a forward base of operations for patrols off of northern China, Korea and in the Sea of Japan. The Russian Empire renamed the harbor Port Arthur. In March 1898 Russia formally leased the region for 25 years from China. The leased area extended to the northern shore of Yadang Bay on the western side of the peninsula; on the eastern side it reached Pikou; Yevgeni Ivanovich Alekseyev, chief of Russian Pacific Fleet, became the head of this territory. The peninsula north of the lease was made a neutral territory in which China agreed not to offer concessions to other countries. In 1899, Russia founded the town of Dalniy (meaning "distant" or "remote"), just north of the naval base at Port Arthur. This would later become the city of Dalian (Dairen).

In 1898 Russia began building a railroad north from Port Arthur to link Dalniy with the Chinese Eastern Railway at Harbin; this spur line was the South Manchurian Railway.

Under the Portsmouth Treaty (1905) resulting from the Russo-Japanese War, Japan replaced Russia as leaseholder. Port Arthur was renamed Ryojun (旅順), and Dalniy was renamed Dairen (大連). Japan also obtained extraterritorial rights in the region north of the territory adjacent to the 885 kilometers (550 mi) South Manchurian Railway in 1905 (i.e. the South Manchuria Railway Zone), which was extended north of Mukden to Changchun. These rights, along with the railway and several spur lines were passed to the corporation known as the South Manchurian Railway Company.

Japan established the Kwantung Governor-general (關東都督府, Kantō Totokufu) to administer the new territory, and based the Kwantung Garrison to defend it and the railway. The Kwantung Garrison later became the Kwantung Army, which played an instrumental role in the founding of Manchukuo. In negotiations with the Republic of China under the Twenty-One Demands, the terms of the lease of the Kwantung Leased Territory were extended to 99 years.

After the foundation of Japanese-controlled Manchukuo in 1932, Japan regarded the sovereignty of the leased territory as transferred from China to Manchukuo. A new lease agreement was contracted between Japan and the government of Manchukuo, and Japan transferred the South Manchurian Railway Zone to Manchukuo. However, Japan retained the Kwantung Leased Territory as a territory apart from the nominally-independent Manchukuo until its surrender at the end of World War II in 1945.

After World War II, the Soviet Union occupied the territory and the Soviet Navy made use of the Ryojun Naval Base. The Soviet Union turned it over to the People's Republic of China in 1955.

== Administration ==
In a reorganization of 1919, the Kwantung Garrison was renamed the Kwantung Army and separated from the civilian administration of the territory, which was designated the Kwantung Bureau (關東廳, Kantō-cho). The Kantō-cho initially directly reported to the office of the Prime Minister of Japan; later it was subordinated to the Ministry of Colonial Affairs. Internally, the Kwantung Leased Area was divided into two districts, with two cities and nine towns. The city assemblies were in part elected, and in part appointed by the governor.

== Economy ==
Massive capital investment was concentrated in Dairen (now the capital of the territory), wherein Japanese firms developed a significant industrial infrastructure, as well as creating a first class port out of the mediocre natural harbor. The facilities of the port at Dairen and its free trade port status made it the principal trade gateway to northeast China. The South Manchurian Railway Company was headquartered in Dairen, and some of the profits from its operation were channelled into transforming Dairen into a showcase city of modern city planning and modern architecture, with hospitals, universities and a large industrial zone.

== Demographics ==
In the Japanese national census of 1935, the population of the Kwantung Leased Territory was 1,034,074, of whom 168,185 were Japanese nationals. The numbers excluded military personnel. The area of the territory was 3,500 square kilometres (1,350 sq mi).

== Governors ==
No.	Picture	Name	Took office	Left office
1		General Baron Yoshimasa Ōshima (大島義昌)	10 October 1905	26 April 1912
2		Lieutenant General Yasumasa Fukushima (福島安正)	26 April 1912	15 September 1914
3		Lieutenant General Nakamura Satoru (中村覚)	15 September 1914	31 July 1917
4		Lieutenant General Yujiro Nakamura (中村雄次郎)	31 July 1917	12 April 1919
5		Gonsuke Hayashi (林權助)	12 April 1919	24 May 1920
6		Isaburō Yamagata (山縣伊三郎)	24 May 1920	8 September 1922
7		Ijūin Hikokichi (伊集院彦吉)	8 September 1922	19 September 1923
8		Hideo Kodama (兒玉秀雄)	26 September 1923	17 December 1927
9		Kenjiro Kinoshita (木下謙次郎)	17 December 1927	17 August 1929
10		Masahiro Ōta (太田政弘)	17 August 1929	16 January 1931
11		Seiji Tsukamoto (塚本淸治)	16 January 1931	11 January 1932
12		Mannosuke Yamaoka (山岡萬之助)	11 January 1932	8 August 1932
13		General Nobuyoshi Mutō (武藤信義)	8 August 1932	28 July 1933
14		General Takashi Hishikari (菱刈隆)	28 July 1933	10 December 1934
15		General Jirō Minami (南次郎)	10 December 1934	6 March 1936
16		General Kenkichi Ueda (植田謙吉)	6 March 1936	7 September 1939
17		General Yoshijirō Umezu (梅津美治郎)	7 September 1939	18 July 1944
18		General Otozō Yamada (山田乙三)	18 July 1944	28 August 1945

== See also ==
- China–Japan relations
- Japanese colonial empire
- Chinese people in Japan
- South Manchuria Railway
- Manchukuo
- Russian Dalian
- Russo-Japanese War
- Ryojun Guard District
