= Takashi Hishikari =

Japanese general (1871-1952)

- 菱刈 隆
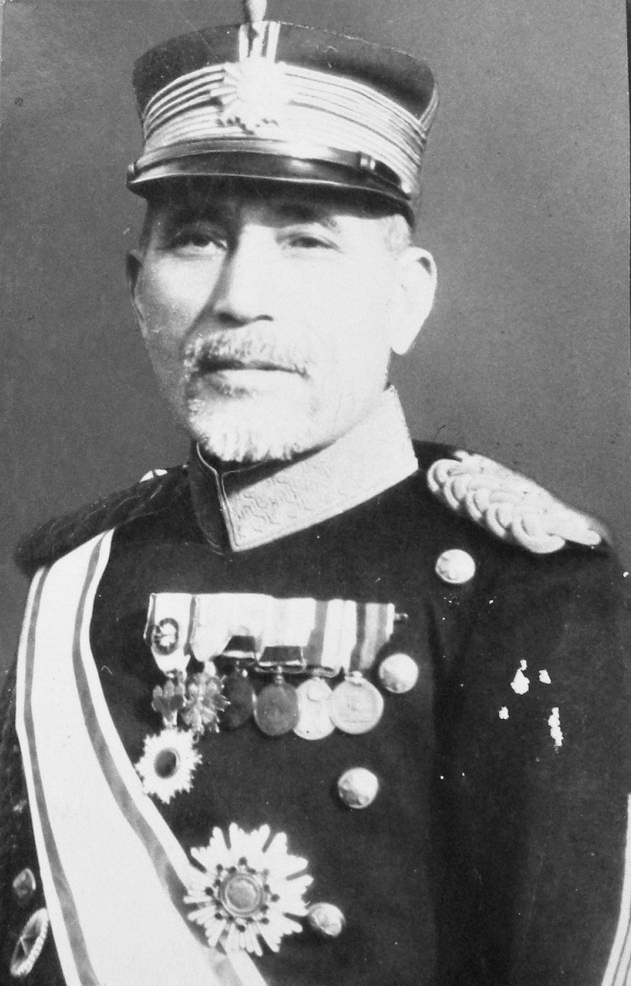

14th Governor-General of the Kwantung Leased Territory
- In office 28 July 1933 – 10 December 1934
- Monarch: Hirohito
- Preceded by: Nobuyoshi Mutō
- Succeeded by: Jirō Minami
Additional positions
Japanese Ambassador to Manchukuo
In office 28 July 1933 – 10 December 1934
Monarch	Hirohito
Prime Minister	Saitō Makoto; Okada Keisuke
Preceded by	Nobuyoshi Mutō
Succeeded by	Jirō Minami
Member of the Supreme War Council
In office 13 December 1931 – 10 December 1934
Monarch	Hirohito
In office 22 December 1930 – 14 April 1931
Monarch	Hirohito

Personal details
- Born: 27 December 1871 Kagoshima, Japan
- Died: 31 July 1952 (aged 80) Hatsudai, Tokyo, Japan
- Resting place: Aoyama Cemetery
- Education: Imperial Japanese Army Academy; Army War College

Military service
- Allegiance: Empire of Japan
- Branch/service: Imperial Japanese Army
- Years of service: 1894–1941
- Rank: General
- Commands: Taiwan Army; Kwantung Army
- Battles/wars: First Sino-Japanese War; Russo-Japanese War; Siberian Intervention; Second Sino-Japanese War

Takashi Hishikari (菱刈 隆, Hishikari Takashi; 27 December 1871 – 31 July 1952) was a general in the Imperial Japanese Army.

== Biography ==
A native of Kagoshima, Hishikari graduated from the 5th class of the Imperial Japanese Army Academy in 1894.

During the First Sino-Japanese War, Hishikari was an officer in the IJA 3rd Infantry Regiment. After the end of the war, he returned to the Army Staff College, graduating from the 16th class in 1902. After graduation, he was appointed commander of the IJA 26th Infantry Regiment.

After serving briefly as Chief of Staff to the Japanese Governor-General of Taiwan, Hishikari became Chief of Staff to the Japanese First Army in the Russo-Japanese War. He later also served during the Siberian Intervention against Bolshevik partisans alongside the White Russian forces in the Russian Maritime Province.

In the interwar period, Hishikari held a number of positions, including Commandant of the Army Academy, commander of the IJA 4th Infantry Regiment, chief of staff of the IJA 2nd Division, and commander of the IJA 23rd Division. He was promoted to major general in July 1918, and lieutenant general in August 1928. He subsequently commanded the IJA 8th Division, IJA 4th Division and the Taiwan Army. He was promoted to full general in August 1929.

In 1930, Hishikari was assigned to be Commander in Chief of Kwantung Army in Manchuria. He was replaced on 1 August 1931, less than a month before the Mukden Incident.

Following Operation Nekka (the invasion of Northern China), Hishikari was promoted in 1933 to be Commander in Chief of the Kwantung Army for the second time. During his period of command, he administered the agreement reached between Japan and China on 7 August 1933 whereby Japan withdrew China to the north of the Great Wall. He also commanded the continuing operations against the remaining Chinese guerilla forces in the newly established state of Manchukuo, to which Hishikari also held the position of Japanese ambassador.

On 25 September 1933, the Soviet Union protested an alleged plot for Manchukuoan seizure of Chinese Eastern Railway accusing that it was a carefully worked out plan adopted in Harbin at a series of meetings of the Japanese military mission and the responsible Japanese administrators of Manchukuo. The Japanese had been offered the railway for sale by the Russians a few months earlier. On 10 December 1934 Hishikari was replaced by General Jirō Minami.

Hishikari served as a member of the Supreme War Council from 1934 to 1935, and went into the reserves. He retired completely from military service in April 1941. From 1943 until his death he was the chairman of the All Japan Kendo Association.

== Notes ==
Government offices
Preceded by Eitaro Hata	Governor-General of Kwantung Leased Territory; 1930–1931	Succeeded by Shigeru Honjō
Preceded by Nobuyoshi Mutō	Governor-General of Kwantung Leased Territory; 1933–1934	Succeeded by Jirō Minami
