= Kenkichi Ueda =

Japanese general (1875–1962)

- 植田 謙吉
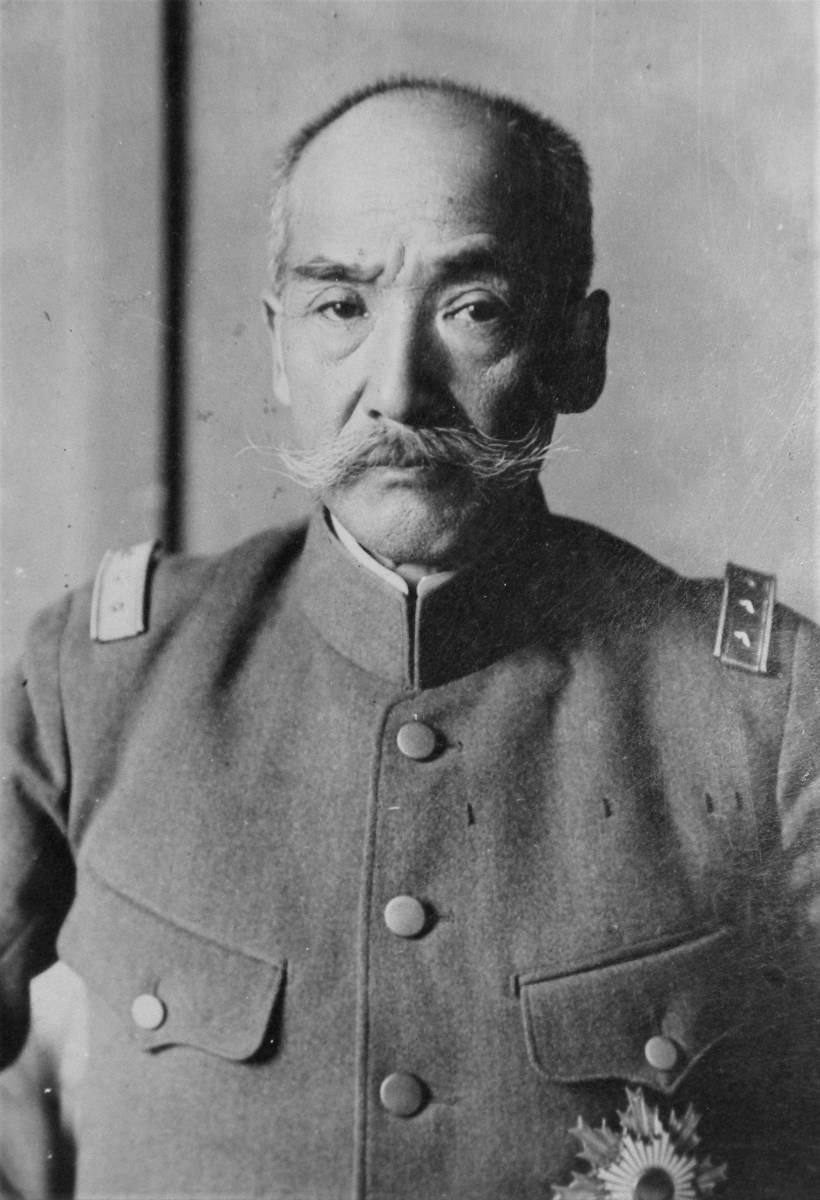

16th Governor-General of the Kwantung Leased Territory
- In office 6 March 1936 – 7 September 1939
- Monarch: Hirohito
- Preceded by: Jiro Minami
- Succeeded by: Yoshijirō Umezu
Additional positions
Japanese Ambassador to Manchukuo
In office 6 March 1936 – 7 September 1939
| Monarch | Hirohito |
| Prime Minister | Okada Keisuke; Kōki Hirota; Senjūrō Hayashi; Fumimaro Konoe; Hiranuma Kiichirō; Nobuyuki Abe |
| Preceded by | Jiro Minami |
| Succeeded by | Yoshijirō Umezu |
Member of the Supreme War Council
In office 2 December 1935 – 6 March 1936
| Monarch | Hirohito |

Personal details
- Born: 8 March 1875 Minamikawachi, Osaka, Japan
- Died: 11 September 1962 (aged 87) Ōiso, Kanagawa, Japan
- Education: Army War College
- Military career
- Allegiance: Empire of Japan
- Branch: Imperial Japanese Army
- Service years: 1898–1939
- Rank: General
- Commands: 9th Division; Japanese Korean Army; Kwantung Army
- Conflicts: Siberian Intervention; Soviet-Japanese Border Wars; Second Sino-Japanese War

Kenkichi Ueda (植田 謙吉, Ueda Kenkichi; 8 March 1875 – 11 September 1962) was a general in the Imperial Japanese Army during the Second Sino-Japanese War. He played an active role in the Soviet-Japanese Border Wars of the late 1930s.

== Biography ==
Born in Osaka Prefecture, Ueda attended the predecessor of Hitotsubashi University and subsequently graduated from the 10th class Imperial Japanese Army Academy in 1898, and the 21st class of the Army Staff College in 1908. Although his specialization was infantry, he was assigned to the 9th Cavalry Brigade under the IJA 18th Division, and was later transferred to the IJA 16th Division. He remained in cavalry for the remainder of his career. Serving as a staff officer in the Siberian Expeditionary Army from 1918 to 1919, Ueda was promoted to colonel in July 1919.

Assigned command of the IJA 1st Cavalry Regiment in 1923, Ueda was promoted to major general in 1924 and was assigned as commanding officer of the IJA 3rd Cavalry Brigade.

Promoted to lieutenant general in 1928, Ueda became commander-in-chief of the Japanese China Garrison Army from March 1929 to the end of December 1930. As commander of the IJA 9th Division from 1930 to 1932, his division was sent into combat during the First Shanghai incident; however, it failed to break the Chinese defenses and Ueda was withdrawn in disgrace and replaced by General Yoshinori Shirakawa's IJA 11th Division. Ueda was subsequently involved in much of the fighting against Chinese forces during the Japanese occupation of Manchuria. He was promoted to the honorific title of Junior Fourth Court Rank.

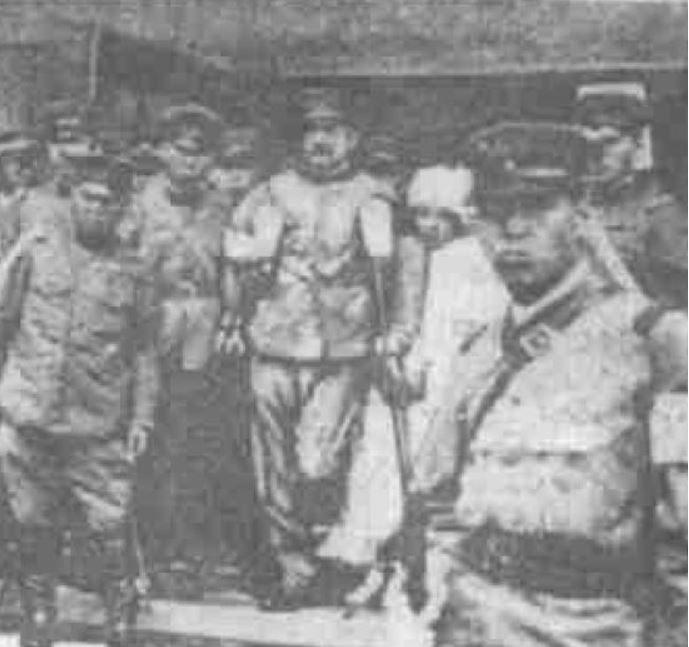
Kenkichi Ueda after Hongkew Park Bombing

Ueda lost a leg in the 29 April 1932 attack by Korean independence activist Yoon Bong-Gil which killed his superior, General Yoshinori Shirakawa in Shanghai's Hongkou Park.

Despite his injury, Ueda remained on active service and returned to Japan to staff postings with the Imperial Japanese Army General Staff, rising to the post of Vice Chief from 1933 to 1934. In 1934, Ueda became the commander-in-chief of the Chosen Army in Korea. Promoted to full general on November 28, 1934, Ueda returned to Manchukuo as commander-in-chief of the Kwantung Army from 1936 to 1939. As commander, Ueda supported measures to suppress the illicit narcotics trade in Manchukuo and northern China.

In 1939, he also held the post of ambassador of Japan to Manchukuo and was a member of the Supreme War Council.

A strong believer in the “Strike North” or Hokushin-ron policy that Japan's main enemy was communism and that Japan's destiny laid in conquest of the natural resources of the sparsely populated north Asian mainland, Ueda supported the unauthorized aggressive actions initiated by staff and field officers on the Soviet border with Manchukuo and Mongolia which led to the Soviet–Japanese border conflicts with heavy fighting and high casualties against Soviet forces around Nomonhan between May and August 1939. Despite the disastrous results of the battles against Soviet forces, Ueda remained adamant in his support of the hokushin-ron policy and refused to discourage his officers from taking similar actions. He was recalled back to Japan in late-1939 and forced into retirement.

Retiring from public life, Ueda lived quietly through World War II. In the postwar era, he served as honorary chairman of various veterans associations and died in 1962.

== Decorations ==
- 1931 – Grand Cordon of the Order of the Sacred Treasure
- 1934 – Grand Cordon of the Order of the Rising Sun
- 1934 – Order of the Golden Kite, 3rd class
