= Convention for the Lease of the Liaotung Peninsula =

1898 treaty leasing Port Arthur to the Russians

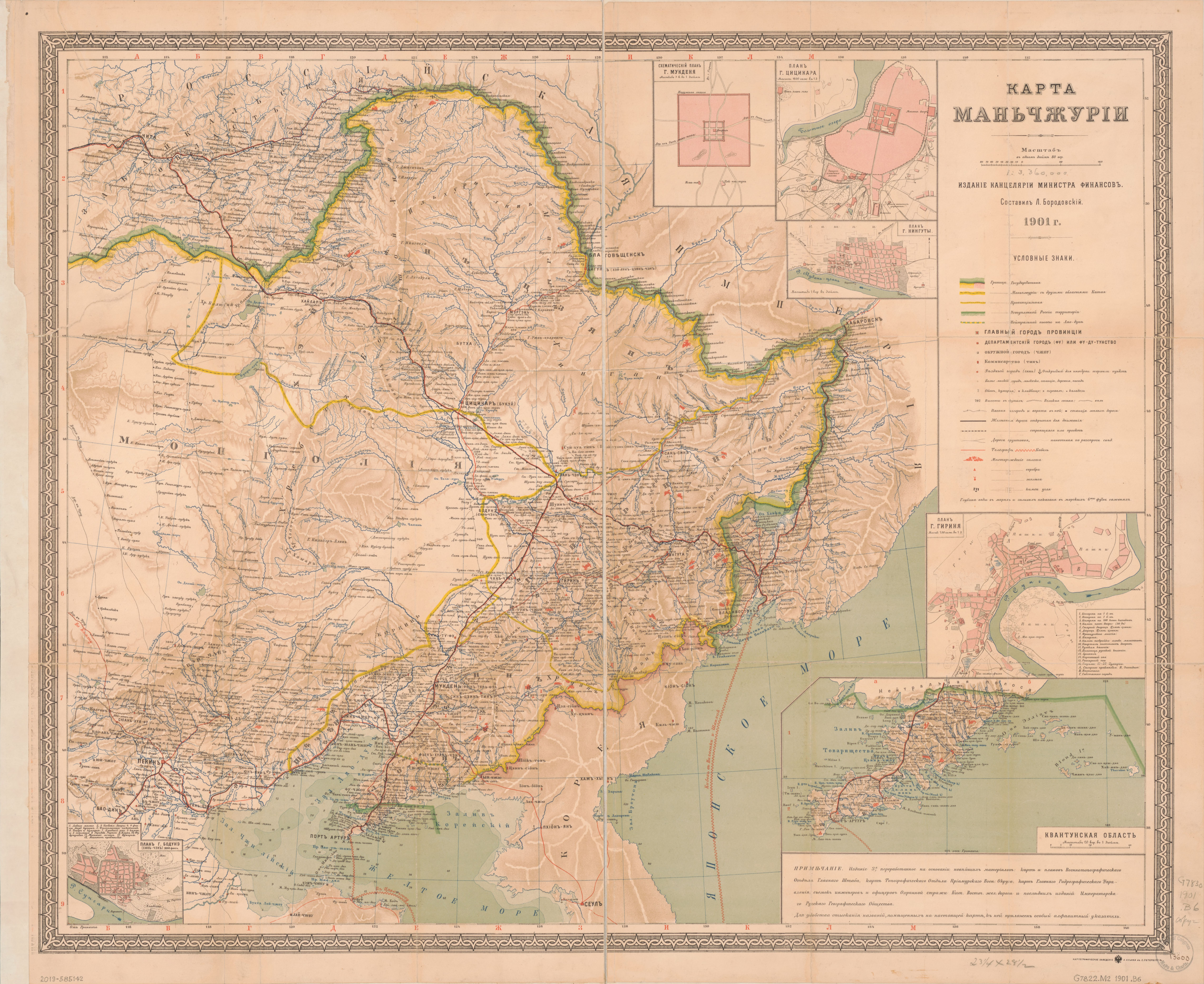
- Map of Manchuria, 1901
- Signed: 27 March 1898; 128 years ago
- Location: Beijing, Qing dynasty
- Signatories: Alexander Pavlov; Li Hongzhang
- Parties: Russian Empire; Qing dynasty
- Languages: Russian; Chinese

Full text
- Convention for the Lease of the Liaotung Peninsula at Wikisource

The Convention for the Lease of the Liaotung Peninsula (Chinese: 旅大租地條約; Russian: Русско-китайская конвенция), also known as the Pavlov Agreement, is an unequal treaty signed between Alexander Pavlov of the Russian Empire and Li Hongzhang of the Qing dynasty of China on 27 March 1898. The treaty granted Russia the lease of Port Arthur (Lüshun) and permitted its railway to extend to the port (later South Manchuria Railway) from one of the points of the Chinese Eastern Railway (CER).

== See also ==
- Russian Dalian
