= Jirō Minami =

Japanese general (1874–1955)

- 南 次郎
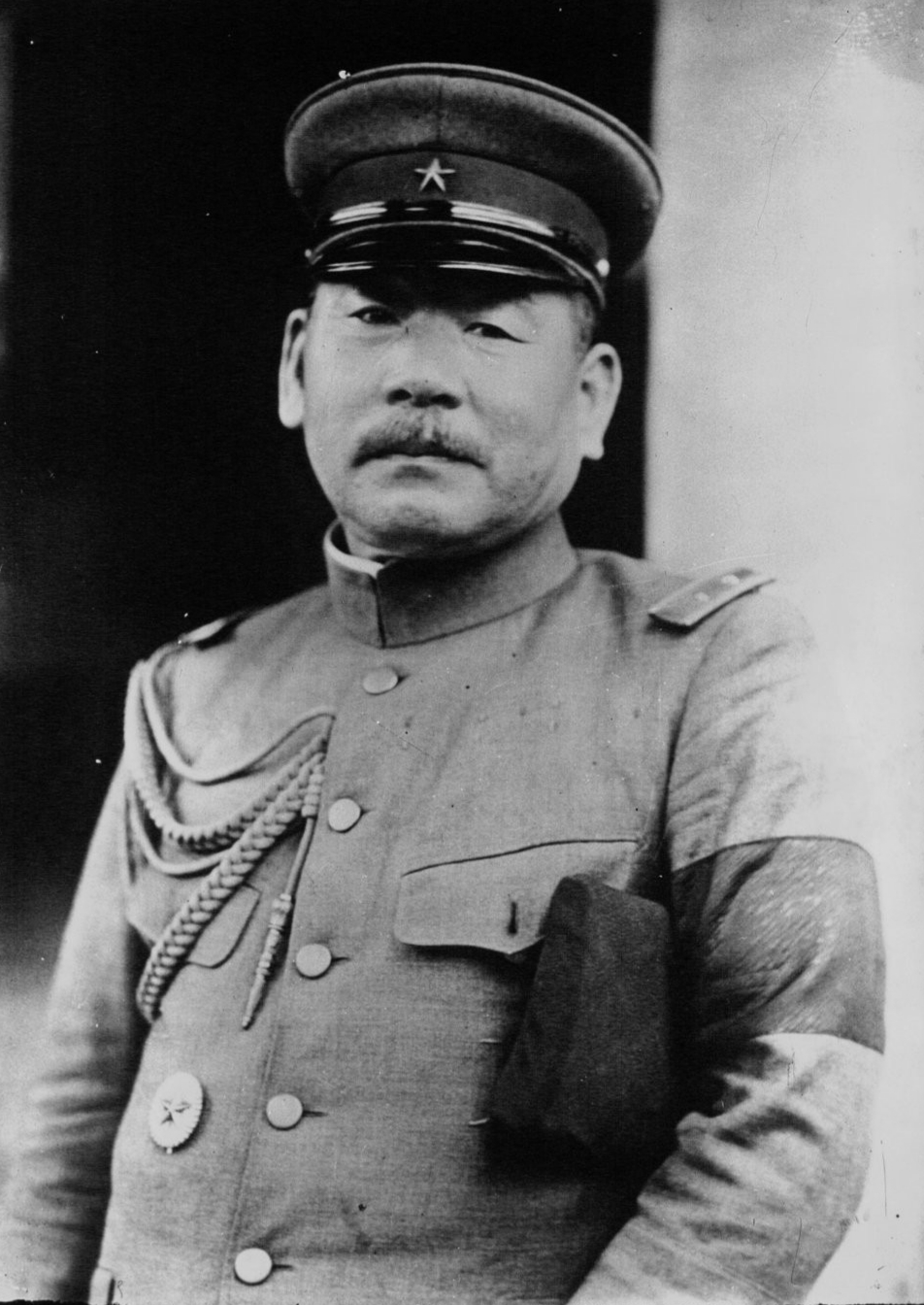
- Minami in 1931

Governor-General of Korea
- In office 5 August 1936 – 15 June 1942
- Monarch: Hirohito
- Preceded by: Kazushige Ugaki
- Succeeded by: Kuniaki Koiso

15th Governor-General of the Kwantung Leased Territory
- In office 10 December 1934 – 6 March 1936
- Monarch: Hirohito
- Preceded by: Takashi Hishikari
- Succeeded by: Kenkichi Ueda

Japanese Ambassador to Manchukuo
- In office 10 December 1934 – 6 March 1936
- Monarch: Hirohito
- Prime Minister: Okada Keisuke
- Preceded by: Takashi Hishikari
- Succeeded by: Kenkichi Ueda

Minister of the Army
- In office 14 April 1931 – 13 December 1931
- Prime Minister: Reijiro Wakatsuki
- Preceded by: Kazushige Ugaki
- Succeeded by: Sadao Araki

Member of the House of Peers
- In office 31 March 1945 – 7 December 1945 Nominated by the Emperor

Member of the Privy Council
- In office 29 May 1942 – 29 March 1945
- Monarchs: Hirohito
Military positions
Commander of the Kwantung Army
In office 10 December 1934 – 6 March 1936
Monarch	Hirohito
Preceded by	Takashi Hishikari
Succeeded by	Kenkichi Ueda
Commander of the Japanese Korean Army
In office 1 August 1929 – 22 November 1930
Monarch	Hirohito
Preceded by	Hanzo Kanaya
Succeeded by	Senjūrō Hayashi
Member of the Supreme War Council
In office 13 December 1931 – 10 December 1934
Monarch	Hirohito
In office 22 December 1930 – 14 April 1931
Monarch	Hirohito

Personal details
- Born: 10 August 1874 Hiji, Ōita, Japan
- Died: 5 December 1955 (aged 81) Kamakura, Kanagawa, Japan

Military service
- Allegiance: Empire of Japan
- Branch/service: Imperial Japanese Army
- Years of service: 1895–1936
- Rank: General
- Commands: 16th Division; Japanese Korean Army; Kwantung Army
- Battles/wars: Russo-Japanese War; Second Sino-Japanese War

Jirō Minami (南 次郎, Minami Jirō; 10 August 1874 – 5 December 1955) was a general in the Imperial Japanese Army and Governor-General of Korea between 1936 and 1942. He was convicted of war crimes and sentenced to life imprisonment.

== Early life ==
Born to an ex-samurai family in Hiji, Ōita Prefecture, Minami came to Tokyo as a boarding student, and was eventually accepted into the Imperial Japanese Army Academy. After graduating from the academy in February 1895, he was commissioned as a second lieutenant in the cavalry in May. He was promoted to lieutenant in October 1897 and to captain in November 1900.

== Career ==
Minami served in the Russo-Japanese War as a member of the headquarters staff and as a company commander in the 1st Cavalry Regiment, where he participated in the Siege of Port Arthur. He was promoted to major in March 1905 and to lieutenant colonel in February 1910. Promoted to colonel in August 1915, he commanded the IJA 13th Cavalry Regiment from 1914 to 1917, during World War I. He was Chief of the Cavalry Section of the Ministry of War from 1917 to 1919.

Attaining the rank of major general in July 1919, Minami served as commander of the IJA 3rd Cavalry Brigade in 1921–1923, then as Commandant of the Cavalry School in 1922–1923, and returned to the Imperial Japanese Army Academy as its commandant in 1923-1924.

Minami was promoted to lieutenant general in February 1924 and commanded the IJA 16th Division from 1926 to 1927. After serving as Vice Chief of the General Staff from 1927 to 1929, he became Commander-in-Chief of the Chosen Army from 1929 to 1930. He was promoted to full general in March 1930.

Returning to Japan, Minami was appointed Minister of War in the Wakatsuki Cabinet in 1931. As War Minister, his role dispatched Major General Yoshitsugu Tatekawa to Manchuria specifically to curb the militarist behaviors of the Kwantung Army, but the Mukden Incident took place to worsen Sino-Japanese relations before Tatekawa could act. Minami was War Minister during the Imperial Colors Incident.

Minami served as a member of the Supreme War Council from 1931 to 1934. He then received a posting as Commander of the Kwantung Army from 1934 to 1936 during which he was concurrently Japanese ambassador to Manchukuo.

Minami was placed on the reserve list in 1936, after the February 26 Incident, and forced into retirement from active service.

However, in 1936, Minami was appointed Governor-General of Korea, a position he then held until 1942. His tenure in Korea was marked by a more hardline approach than his predecessors, with a rolling back of various liberal reforms of the 1920s. In addition, Minami outlawed all but one of the Korean-language newspapers and strongly pushed for the soshi-kamei policy.

After his term in Korea, Minami served as a member of the Privy Council from 1942 to 1945. In March, when the Imperial Rule Assistance Political Association in the Diet reorganised into the Dai Nippon Seijikai, Minami was chosen as president of the new organisation. He immediately resigned from the Privy Council and was appointed to the House of Peers.

== Arrest and conviction ==
After World War II, Minami was arrested by the American Occupation authorities and brought before the International Military Tribunal for the Far East. He was convicted only of Counts 1 and 27, of being a leader in the plan to wage an unprovoked war of aggression against China, largely since he was Minister of War at the time of the Manchurian Incident. However, he was acquitted of waging a war of aggression against the United States, the British Commonwealth, and the Netherlands and was also acquitted of two charges related to prisoner abuse. He was sentenced to life in prison but was paroled in 1954 on the grounds of his health. He died a year later.

Political offices
Preceded by Kazushige Ugaki	Minister of War; 14 April 1931 – 13 December 1931	Succeeded by Sadao Araki
Government offices
Preceded by Takashi Hishikari	Governor of Kwantung Leased Territory; Dec 1934 – Mar 1936	Succeeded by Kenkichi Ueda
Preceded by Kazushige Ugaki	Governor-General of Korea; Aug 1936 – May 1942	Succeeded by Kuniaki Koiso
Military offices
Preceded by Hanzo Kanaya	Commander, IJA Chosen Army; Aug 1929 – Nov 1930	Succeeded by Senjuro Hayashi
Preceded by Takashi Hishikari	Commander, Kwantung Army; Dec 1934 – Mar 1936	Succeeded by Kenkichi Ueda
