= Nobuyoshi Mutō =

Imperial Japanese Army field marshal (1868–1933)

Gensui Baron Nobuyoshi Mutō
- 武藤 信義
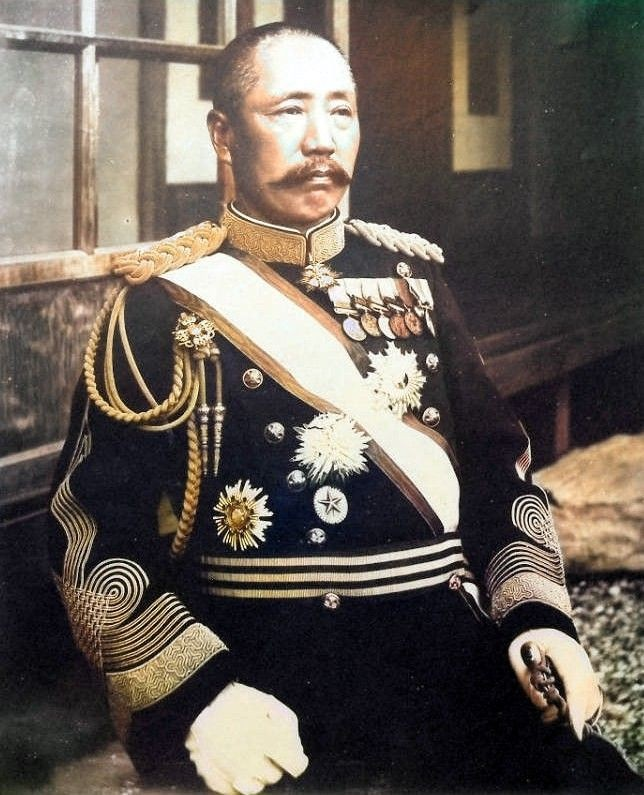

13th Governor-General of the Kwantung Leased Territory
- In office 8 August 1932 – 27 July 1933
- Monarch: Hirohito
- Preceded by: Mannosuke Yamaoka
- Succeeded by: Takashi Hishikari
Additional positions
Japanese Ambassador to Manchukuo
In office 30 November 1932 – 27 July 1933
Monarch	Hirohito
Prime Minister	Saitō Makoto
Preceded by	Position established
Succeeded by	Takashi Hishikari
Member of the Supreme War Council
In office 26 May 1932 – 8 August 1932
Monarch	Hirohito
In office 1 May 1925 – 28 July 1926
Monarch	Taishō

Personal details
- Born: 15 July 1868 Shiroishi, Hizen, Japan
- Died: 27 July 1933 (aged 65) Xinjing, Manchukuo
- Resting place: Gokoku-ji
- Education: Imperial Japanese Army Academy
- Occupation: Military attaché, ambassador
- Awards: Order of the Golden Kite (1st class, 2nd class, 3rd class); Order of the Rising Sun (1st class)

Military service
- Allegiance: Empire of Japan
- Branch/service: Imperial Japanese Army
- Years of service: 1894–1933
- Rank: Field Marshal
- Unit: Imperial Guards; Imperial Japanese Army General Staff Office
- Commands: Harbin Special Agency; IJA 3rd Division; Tokyo Defense Command; Kwantung Army
- Battles/wars: First Sino-Japanese War; Russo-Japanese War; Siberian intervention; Inner Mongolian Campaign; Defense of the Great Wall; Battle of Rehe

Gensui Baron Nobuyoshi Mutō (武藤 信義, Mutō Nobuyoshi; 15 July 1868 – 27 July 1933) was a field marshal in the Imperial Japanese Army who served as Commander of the Kwantung Army, ambassador to Manchukuo and Governor-General of the Kwantung Leased Territory.

== Biography ==
Mutō was born into a samurai family from Saga Domain. After graduating from the Imperial Japanese Army Academy, he served in the First Sino-Japanese War as a lieutenant in the infantry. After the war and his promotion to captain, he was sent twice to Russia as a military attaché, spending time in Vladivostok and in Odessa. He was fluent in the Russian language, which proved invaluable during the Russo-Japanese War. After his promotion to major, then colonel, he returned to Japan in a posting with the Imperial Guards.

From 1915 to 1916, Mutō was Chief of 2nd Section (Maneuvers), 1st Bureau, Imperial Japanese Army General Staff Office. From 1917, he was assigned to military intelligence and headed the Harbin Special Agency and operational offices in Irkutsk and Omsk. He returned to administrative positions in Japan from 1919 to 1921, before being appointed commander of the IJA 3rd Division in 1921 and being dispatched to Russia during the Siberian intervention against the Bolshevik Red Army.

With the death of General Taro Utsunomiya in 1922, Muto became the leader of the Saga clique within the army. This had been formed by officers descended from the Saga Domain to protect their interests against the dominant Chōshū clique, but had also attracted officers outside the domain. Participants included Sadao Araki, Jinzaburō Masaki and Heisuke Yanagawa, who later formed the core of the Kōdōha. During the 1920s, the group joined forces with Marshal Yūsaku Uehara to oppose the mainstream Ugaki faction.

Mutō returned to Japan in 1922 as Vice Chief of the General Staff under Uehara. He left the position in 1925, and was member of the Supreme War Council from 1925 to 1926. He was briefly appointed commander of Tokyo Defense Command before assuming the role of Commander in Chief of the Kwantung Army, from 28 July 1926 to 26 August 1927. He was then appointed Inspector-General of Military Training.

Upon the retirement of General Sōroku Suzuki in 1930, Uehara attempted to promote Mutō to Chief of General Staff. Mutō was widely admired and a strong campaign arose for his appointment within the army, but Ugaki regarded this as an interference in his prerogatives in personnel matters, and forced the appointment of his protégé Hanzō Kanaya.

He was reappointed commander of the Kwantung Army in 1932. The political and military importance of this position had increased after the Japanese invasion of Manchuria and the foundation of Manchukuo. Mutō concurrently served as ambassador to Manchukuo and Governor of the Kwantung Leased Territory. As ambassador, Mutō signed the Japan-Manchukuo Protocol of September 1932. In 1933, he supervised Operation Nekka, the invasion of Jehol. In early 1933, he was promoted to Gensui.

Diagnosed with jaundice, Mutō died in a hospital in Xinjing, Manchukuo. His elevation to the title of danshaku (baron) was posthumous, as were his awards of the Order of the Golden Kite (1st class) and Order of the Rising Sun (1st class). His grave is at the Buddhist temple of Gokoku-ji in Tokyo, and the sword he received on his promotion to gensui is on display at the Yūshūkan Museum at Yasukuni Shrine in Tokyo.

=== Alternative theory of death ===
Amleto Vespa, a spy and former mercenary active in Manchukuo, and the journalist Edgar Snow claimed that Mutō did not die of jaundice; that he had, rather, committed seppuku to protest against the corruption and abuses he found in Manchukuo.

Military offices
Preceded by Yoshinori Shirakawa	Commander of the Kwangtung Army; 1926–1927	Succeeded by Chōtarō Muraoka
Preceded by Shinnosuke Kikuchi	Inspector-General of Military Training; 1927–1932	Succeeded by Senjūrō Hayashi
Preceded by Shigeru Honjō	Commander of the Kwangtung Army; 1932–1933	Succeeded by Takashi Hishikari
Government offices
Preceded by Mannosuke Yamaoka	Governor of the Kwantung Leased Territory; 1932–1933	Succeeded by Takashi Hishikari
Diplomatic posts
New post	Ambassador to Manchukuo; 1932–1933	Succeeded by Takashi Hishikari
