= Jo Iimura =

Imperial Japanese Army lieutenant general (1888–1976)

- 飯村 穣
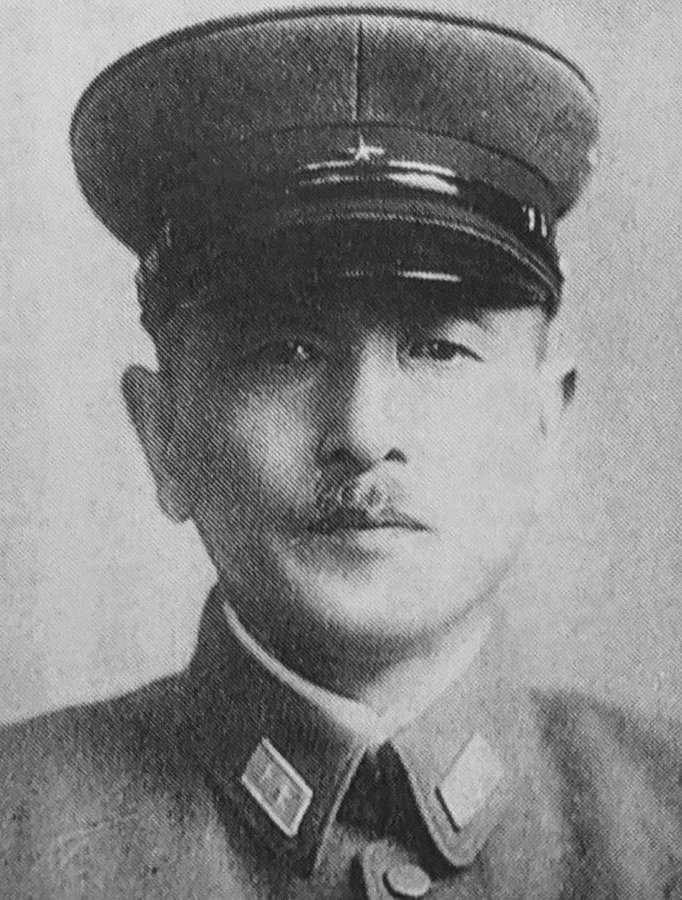
- Born: 20 May 1888; Tsukuba, Ibaraki, Japan
- Died: 21 February 1976 (aged 87); Bunkyō, Tokyo, Japan
- Education: Imperial Japanese Army Academy; Tokyo University of Foreign Studies; Army War College
- Military career
- Allegiance: Empire of Japan
- Branch: Imperial Japanese Army
- Service years: 1909–1945
- Rank: Lieutenant general
- Units: Imperial Guards 3rd Regiment, Chosen Army, Imperial Japanese Army General Staff, Kwantung Army, Southern Army
- Commands: 61st Infantry Regiment, Army Staff College, 5th Army, Southern Army, 2nd Area Army, Tokyo Defense Army, Tokyo Divisional District
- Conflicts: Second Sino-Japanese War; World War II
- Other work: Military attaché, provost marshal

Jo Iimura (飯村 穣, Iimura Jō; 20 May 1888 – 21 February 1976) was a lieutenant general in the Imperial Japanese Army during World War II.

== Biography ==
A native of Ibaraki Prefecture, Iimura graduated from the 21st class of the Imperial Japanese Army Academy in 1909, and was assigned to the Imperial Guards 3rd Regiment. Simultaneously, he also attended class work at the Tokyo University of Foreign Studies, graduating in March 1917 with a degree in French. He then entered the 33rd class of the Army Staff College, emerging in 1919 as a captain in the infantry. After a short assignment with the Chosen Army in Korea and as an instructor at the Army Staff College, he was promoted to lieutenant colonel and assigned as military attaché to Turkey. during his time as military attache in Turkey he criticized Turkish General staff's lectures on the Russo-Japanese War and sent a memo about inaccuracies in their published works. In return Turkish General Staff requested him to hold lectures about the war in Ankara.

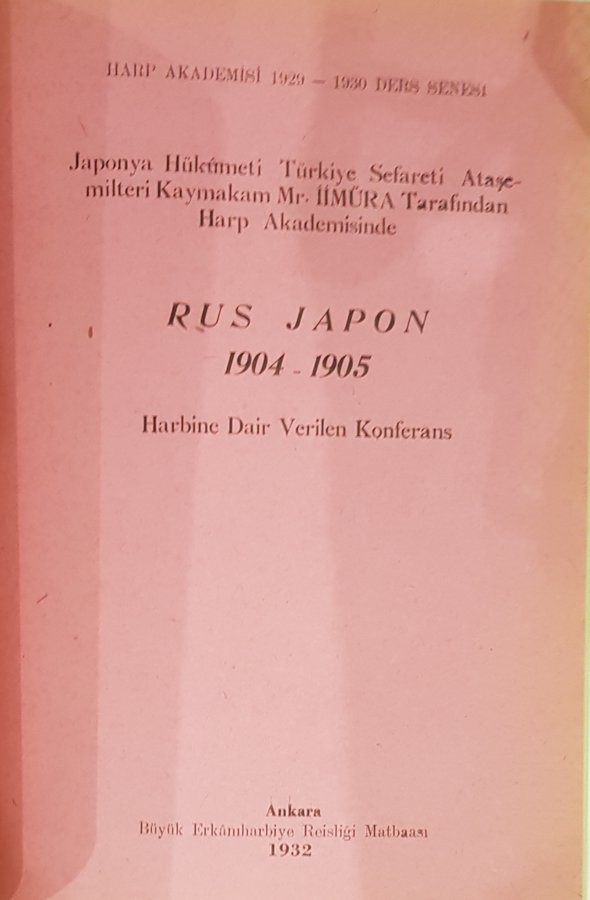
Conferance in Turkish Militiary academy about Russo-Japanese War by Lieutenant Colonel Iimura

After Iimura returned to Japan, he was promoted to colonel in August 1932 and served in various staff positions within the Imperial Japanese Army General Staff. He was given a field position as commander of the IJA 61st Infantry Regiment in March 1935.

With the start of the Second Sino-Japanese War, Iimura was promoted in March 1937 to major general. He was Commandant of the Army Staff College from 1938–1939, and transferred to Manchukuo to become Chief of Staff of the Kwantung Army from 1939-1940. He subsequently became commander in chief of the IJA 5th Army in Manchukuo from 1941-1943. Iijuma was recalled to Japan in 1943 to resume his position as Commandant of the Army Staff College, but with the situation continuing to deteriorate for the Japanese in the southern front of the Pacific War, he was reassigned to a combat command as Chief of Staff of the Southern Army in 1944, and Commander in Chief of the depleted 2nd Area Army, based in Manchukuo from 1944-1945. He returned to Japan shortly before the end of the war to assume command of the Tokyo Defense Army and Tokyo Divisional District in anticipation of the American invasion of the Japanese home islands. He was appointed Provost Marshal immediately before the end of the war in 1945.
