= Russian Dalian =

Territory of Imperial Russia from 1898 to 1905

Russian Dalian Kvantunskaya Oblast Дальний Квантунская Область
- Leased territory (colony) of the Russian Empire
- 1898–1905
- Flag

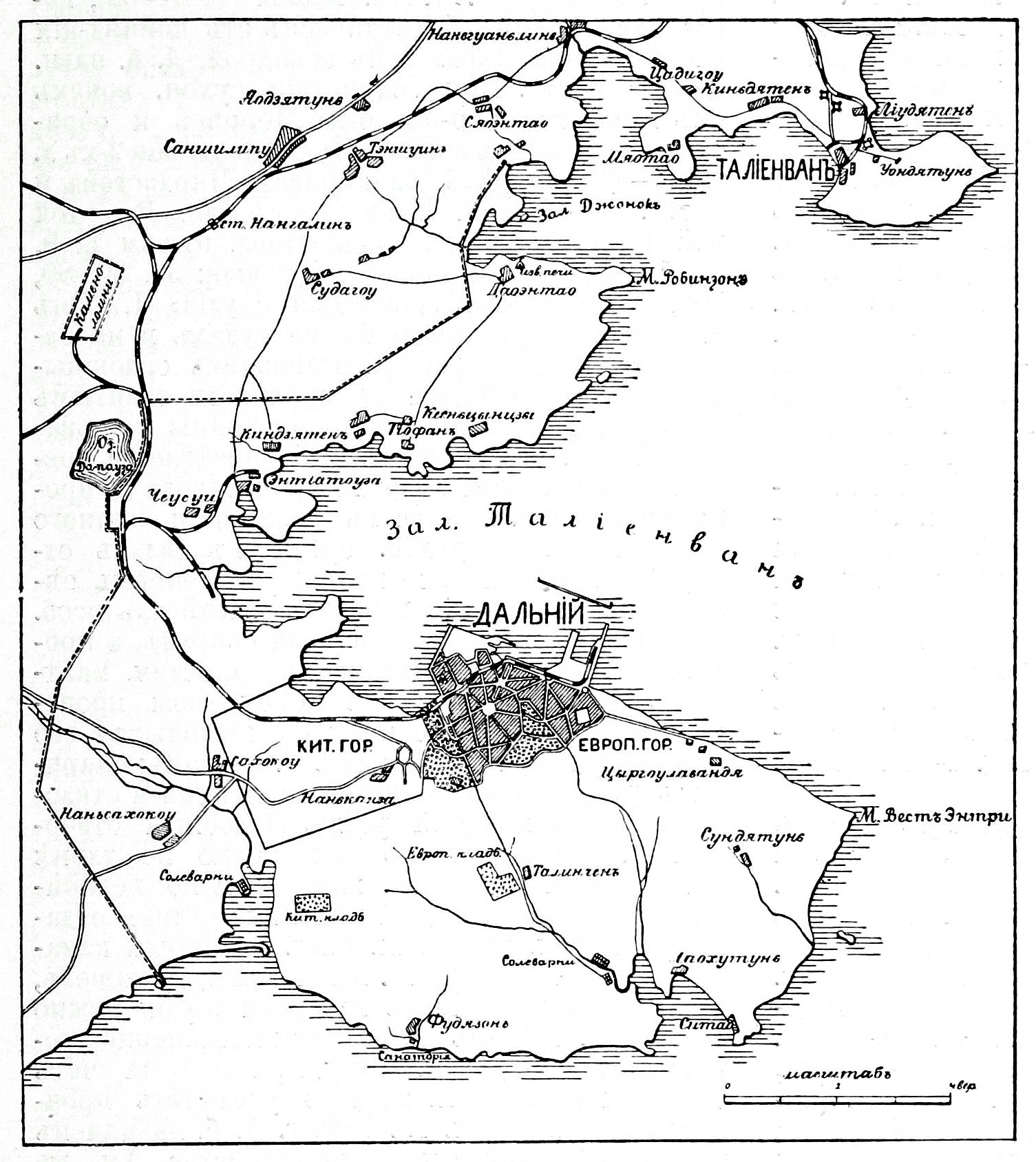
- Russian Dalian

Anthem
- "Боже, Царя храни!" Bozhe Tsarya khrani! (1898–1905) ("God Save the Tsar!")
- Capital: Dalniy
- Government
  - Type: Absolute monarchy
- Emperor
  - 1898–1905: Nicholas II
- Historical era: New Imperialism
  - Pavlov Agreement: 1898
  - Ceded to Japan: 1905
Preceded by	Succeeded by
Qing dynasty	Kwantung Leased Territory
- Today part of: China

Russian Dalian, also known as Kvantunskaya Oblast, was a leased territory ruled by the Russian Empire that existed between its establishment after the Pavlov Agreement in 1898 and its annexation by the Empire of Japan after the Russo-Japanese War in 1905.

Located near the southernmost point of the Liaodong Peninsula, the city of Dalian came under the territorial control of the Russian Empire from 1898 until their defeat in the Russo-Japanese War in 1905. The Russians called the city Dalniy (Russian: Дальний), which means "distant" or "remote", describing the city's location relative to the Russian heartland. The modern Chinese name, Dalian, comes from a Chinese reading of the Japanese colonial name Dairen, which itself was a loose transliteration of the Russian name Dalniy. Under Russian control, Dalniy grew into a vibrant port city; before its loss in 1905 it was one terminus of the Russian-controlled Chinese Eastern Railway.

== Background ==
The 1890s saw the intensification of rivalries among Qing China, Japan, and Russia—with the lesser interests of Great Britain, Germany, and the United States—over paramount influence in Manchuria. For Russia, the region of the Liaodong Peninsula was of particular interest as one of the few areas in the region that had the potential to develop ice-free ports. These rivalries came to their first armed conflict during the Sino-Japanese War of 1894–1895, which resulted in Japan's resounding victory over the Qing Dynasty, a contest that involved a battle over the port of Lushun (later called Port Arthur) near what would become Dalian or Dalniy. The engagements on the Liaodong Peninsula between Japanese and Chinese troops confirmed to the Japanese the strategic importance of the region, and in particular the strategic positioning of the region around Dalian. Though Japan seized control over the peninsula and was awarded it in the subsequent Treaty of Shimonoseki (1895), it was forced to retrocede it to Qing China following the diplomatic pressure of Russia, Germany, and France, the so-called Triple Intervention of 1895. This would contribute to the growing and bitter rivalry between Japan and Russia while also paving the way for the Russian seizure of the region three years later.

In 1897 Russia signed with Qing China a secret agreement for the establishment under Russian guidance of the Chinese Eastern Railway. On December 15, 1897, Russia, fearing that without decisive action it might lose its chance to seize the port of Dalian to another imperial power such as Germany, which earlier that year had taken control of Qingdao, had its fleet steam into Dalian harbor. On March 27, 1898, Russia signed the Pavlov Agreement with China, which granted Russia a 25-year lease on Dalian and Lushun and exclusive right to lay a branch of the Chinese Eastern Railway to them—what would become the South Manchurian Railway. At first, the flags of both China and Russia were raised over the city, something that assuaged the anger of some local Chinese. Within a few weeks, however, the Chinese ensign was no longer flying.

== Development ==
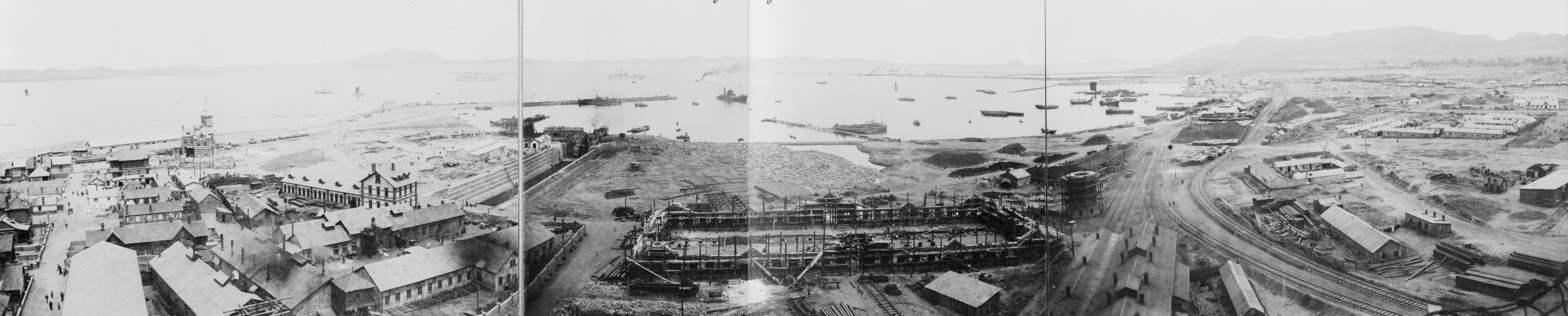
A panorama of Dalniy around 1898.

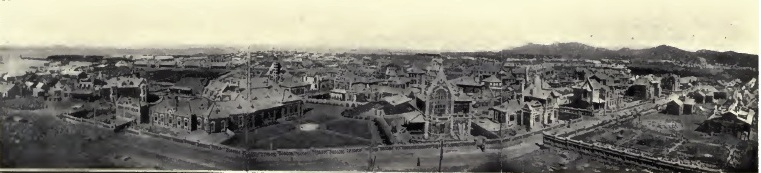
Dalniy panorama around 1903.

Dalniy soon became a center of Russian military power in the Far East. In 1897 there were already 12,500 Russian troops in Lushun and the surrounding area, a number that would grow to 35,000 by 1904. However, the powerful Russian Finance Minister Sergei Witte had larger visions for the region than just a military garrison. Witte was overseeing the development of the Chinese Eastern Railway and soon pushed through plans to extend the railway from Harbin to the port at Dalny. In such a vision the city would become a powerful open trading port in the Far East while nearby Port Arthur would be an exclusive Russian military city. On 8 November 1899, Nicholas II ordered the start of construction of this port city, and—at Witte's suggestion—christened the city Dal'nii (or Dalniy: Dalian), meaning "far away" in Russian. Between 1899 and 1903 the Chinese Eastern Railway, which had obtained the concession to build the South Manchurian Railway terminating in Dalny, pumped nearly 20 million rubles into the city's development.

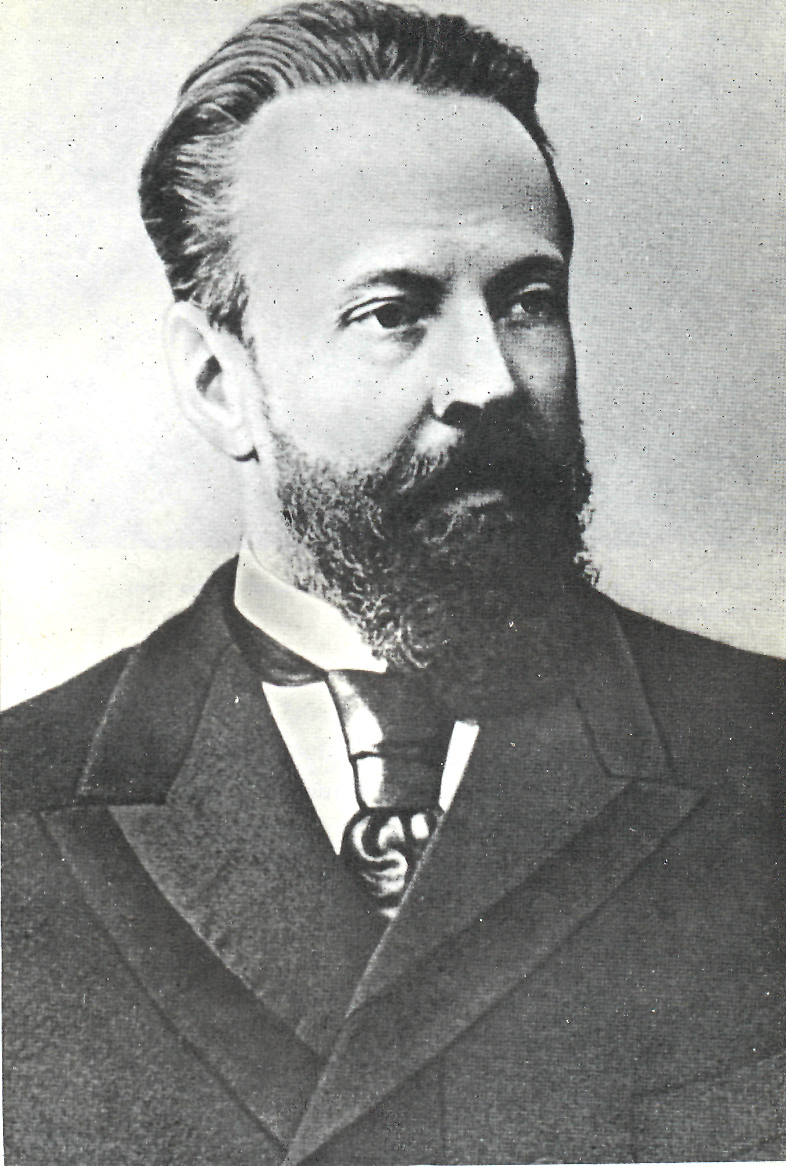
Sergei Witte, whose vision was a key catalyst in the development of Dalniy (1905).

In 1899 V.V. Sakharov (Владимир Васильевич Сахаров, 1860–1904, died of typhoid fever in besieged Port Arthur), a Russian engineer who had been tasked earlier with the design of Vladivostok, was selected to implement plans for the development of Russian Dalniy. He approached the monumental task of transforming what was a scattering of sleepy Chinese fishing villages into a port city to rival Shanghai or Tianjin by dividing construction into two phases. Overall Sakharov's plans were inspired by the "Garden City" or "City Beautiful" movements that were influencing and transforming the urban centers of Europe and America. It called for the city to be divided into five connected districts—one commercial, two administrative, one residential, and one Chinese, and all supplied with electricity and a modern water system.

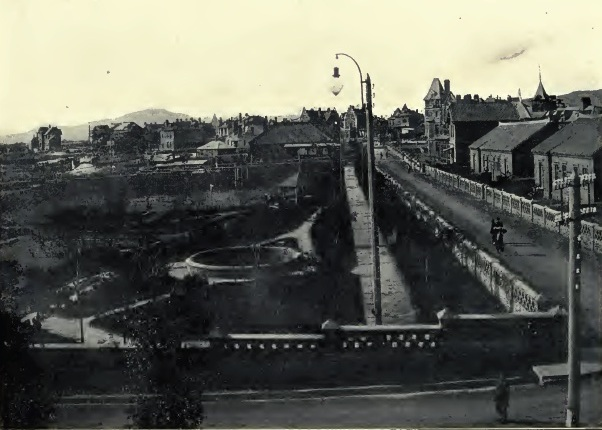
The official quarter of Russian Dalniy (1904).

In the first phase from 1899 to 1902 two main wharves were built capable of berthing twenty-five ships of 1000 tons. The wharves were never completed by the time the Japanese seized control of the city in 1905 in the wake of the Russo-Japanese War. But by 1902 much of the wharf construction had been completed and that year over 900 ships from eight countries docked in the new facilities. Nevertheless, considering the existence of a large Russian port at Vladivostok, as well as a better developed Chinese port at nearby Yingkou (Newchwang), Dalniy had its detractors, who dubbed it Lishny ("superfluous"). In any case, from a maritime standpoint, the major attraction of the location for the Russians was as a naval—rather than a commercial—port.

The Russian development of the city by necessity involved the uprooting of the location's original Chinese inhabitants. In the summer of 1899, this sparked an angry riot in which Chinese attacked the railway office with stones, dragging away the Chinese clerks and interpreters working for the Russians. Nevertheless, the city's development also brought opportunities, and during the years of Russian tenureship tens of thousands of Chinese migrated into the area.

In terms of the railroad, construction linking Dalniy with Harbin was begun apace and by January 1903 the rail link between the two cities was complete. In February 1903, the first express train arrived in Dalniy from Harbin and by that August Dalniy was successfully linked by rail to the Russian homeland.

By 1904, enough progress had been made on the development of the city to embolden the Comte Cassini, Russian minister to the United States, to declare that "Harbin and Dalniy are monuments to Russian progressiveness and civilization."

== Legacy ==
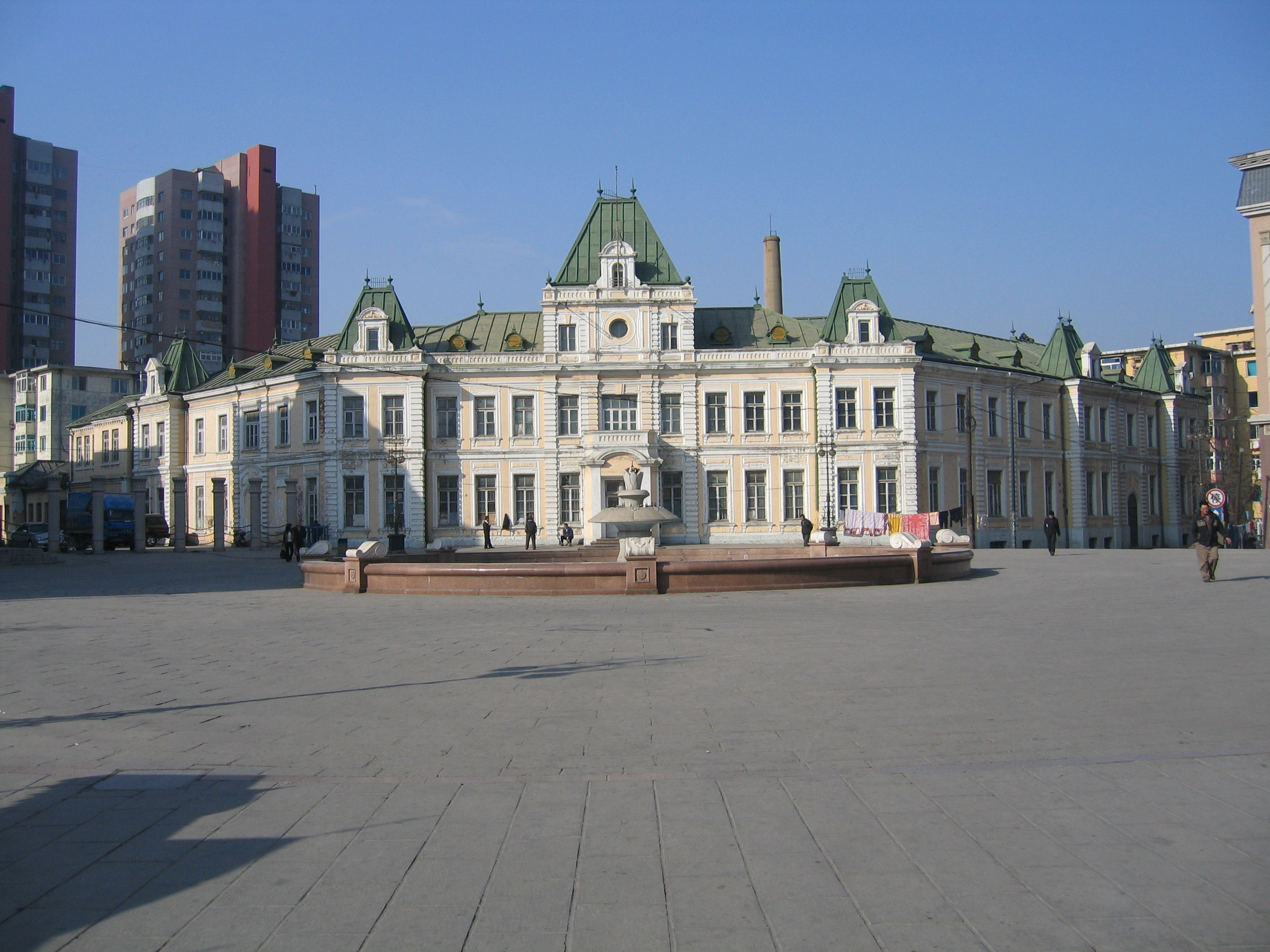
The former Russian City Hall of Dalniy (built c. 1900)

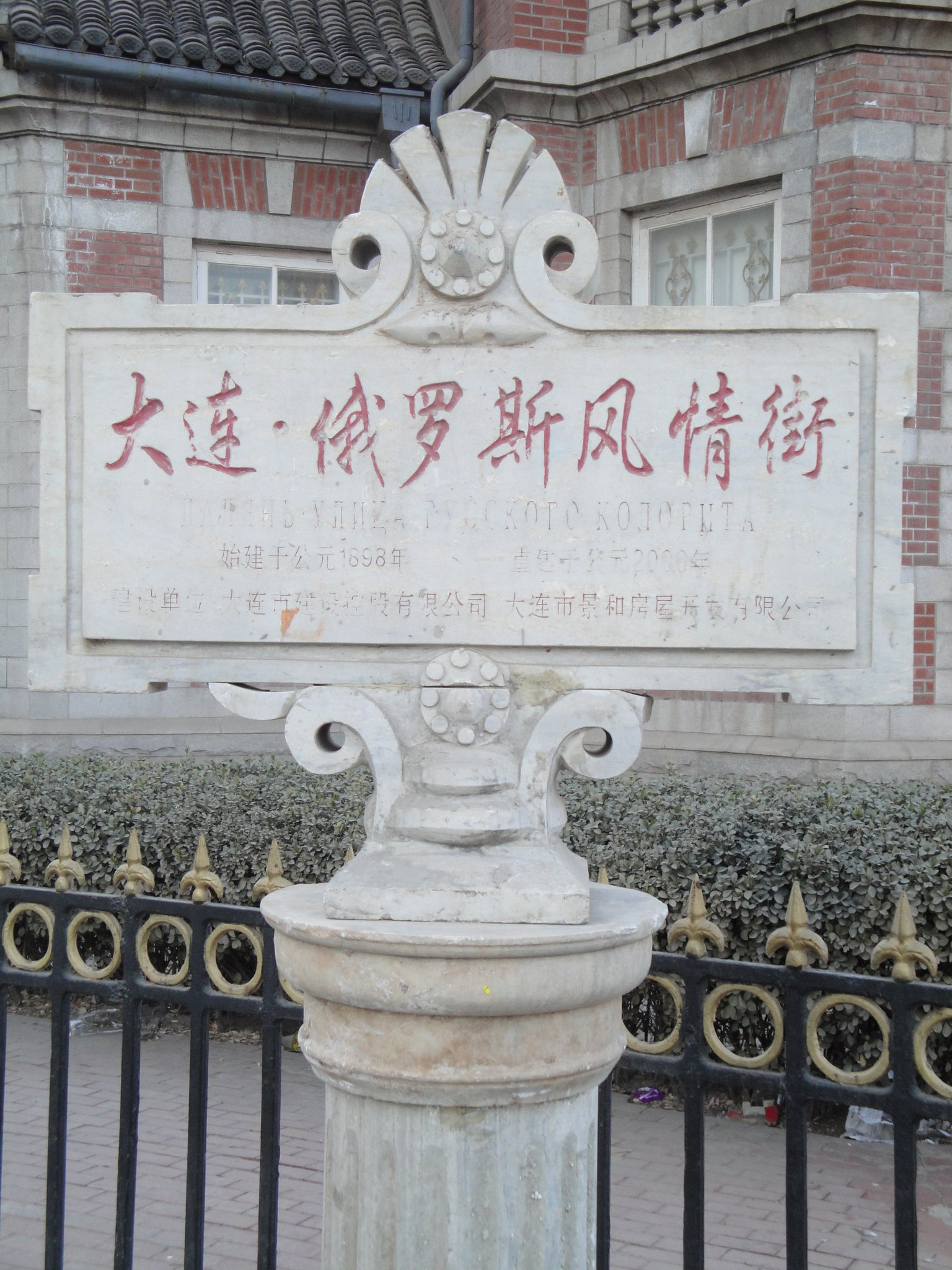
Commemorative sign at Russian Culture Street

Most remnants of Russia's seven-year tenure in Dalian are located along what is today called Russian Street (Русская улица Russkaia ulitsa), originally Engineer Street (улица Инженерная ulitsa Inzhenernaia), the oldest street in Dalian.

=== Soviet occupation ===
During World War II, Dalian was occupied by Japan. After the war, with the unconditional surrender of Japan in September 1945, the city passed to the Soviets, following the Soviet invasion of Manchuria. Described in 1949 as "New China's model metropolis" by the Chinese Communist Party, the former colonial city was occupied by the Soviet military from 1945 to 1950. Soviet-inspired policies were enacted in the city and contributed to ideas of socialist urbanization.

=== Modern ===
In the mid-1990s, the mayor of Dalian, Bo Xilai, conceived the idea of renovating the remaining Russian-era structures on the street, adding new ones built in a Russian style, and renaming the street Russian Street. Work on the project began in 1999 and brought in Russian architects and other experts. Eight Russian era buildings were renovated, including the former Russian Dalniy City Hall, six new buildings were built, and six other existing structures were given "Russian façades" to match the street's theme. The newly renovated street was inaugurated on 1 October 2000.

== Administrators ==
No.	Portrait	Name (Birth–Death)	Term of office		
No.	Portrait	Name (Birth–Death)	Took office	Left office	Time in office
Командир (Commander)
1		Fyodor Vasilyevich Dubasov (1845–1912)	27 December 1897	13 May 1898	137 days
2		Oskar Ludwig Starck (1846–1928)	13 May 1898	18 September 1898	128 days
Администратор (Administrator)
3		Dejan (Ivanovich) Subotić (1852–1920)	18 September 1898	July 1899	9 months
Главный администратор (Chief Administrator)
4		Yevgeni Ivanovich Alekseyev (1843–1917) (Note: From 12 August 1903, also Viceroy (Namestnik) of the Russian Far East.)	29 August 1899	1 January 1905	5 years, 125 days
–		Anatoly Mikhaylovich Stessel (1848–1915); Acting for absent Alekseyev	12 March 1904	1 January 1905	295 days

== See also ==
- Kwantung Leased Territory
- Kiautschou Bay Leased Territory
