= Imoto =

Imoto (written 井本) is a Japanese surname. Notable people with the surname include:

- Ayako Imoto (イモト アヤコ, born 1986), Japanese comedian
- Isamu Imoto (井本 勇, 1925–2018), Japanese politician
- Kumao Imoto (井本 熊男, 1903–2000), Japanese military officer
- Naoko Imoto (井本 直歩子, born 1976), Japanese swimmer
