= Japanese cruiser Atago =

Takao-class heavy cruiser

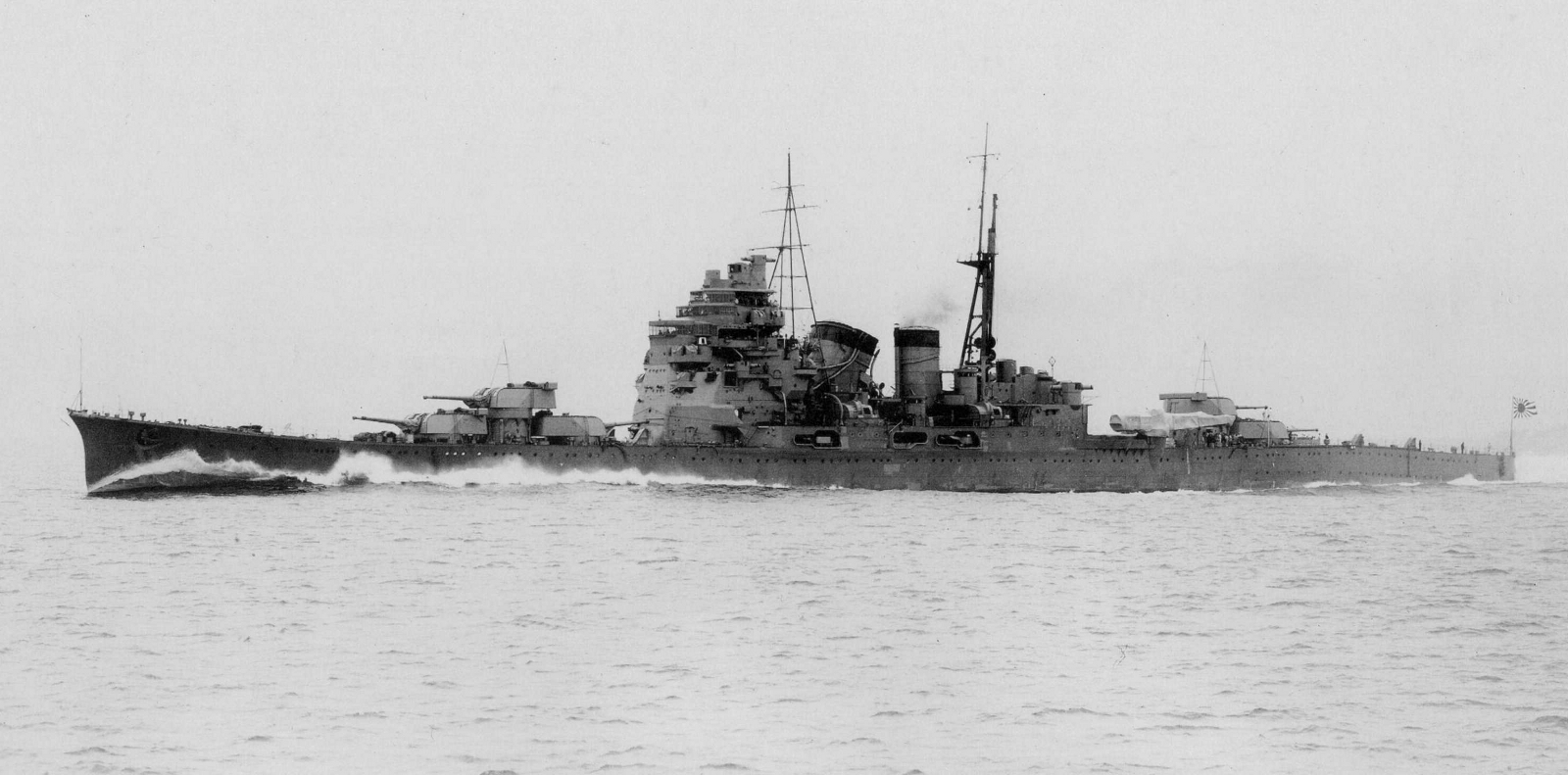
- Atago on sea trials in 1932

History

Empire of Japan
- Name: Atago
- Namesake: Mount Atago
- Ordered: 1927 fiscal year
- Builder: Kure Naval Arsenal
- Laid down: 28 April 1927
- Launched: 16 June 1930
- Commissioned: 30 March 1932
- Fate: Torpedoed and sunk, 23 October 1944

General characteristics
- Class & type: Takao-class cruiser
- Displacement: 9,850 long tons (10,008 t) (standard); 14,616 long tons (14,851 t) (full load)
- Length: 203.76 m (668.5 ft)
- Beam: 19–20.4 m (62–67 ft)
- Draft: 6.11 m (20.0 ft) (standard); 6.32 m (20.7 ft) (full load)
- Installed power: 133,100 shp (99,300 kW)
- Propulsion: 4 × geared steam turbines; 12 × Kampon boilers; 4 × shafts
- Speed: 34.2–35.5 kn (63.3–65.7 km/h; 39.4–40.9 mph)
- Range: 8,500 nmi (15,700 km; 9,800 mi) at 14 kn (26 km/h; 16 mph)
- Complement: 773
- Armament: Original Layout: 10 × 20 cm/50 3rd Year Type naval guns (5x2); 4 × 12 cm/45 10th Year Type naval guns (4x1); 2 × 40 mm (1.6 in) anti-aircraft guns (2x1); Type 90 torpedoes (4x2 + 8 reloads); Final Layout (June 24, 1944): 10 × 20 cm/50 3rd Year Type naval guns (5x2); 8 × Type 89 12.7 cm (5 in) dual purpose guns, (4x2); 60 × Type 96 25 mm (1.0 in) AA guns (4x3, 8x2, 32x1); 4 × Type 93 13.2 mm (0.5 in) AA machine guns; Type 93 torpedoes (4x4 + 8 reloads); depth charges
- Armor: Belt: 38–127 mm (1.5–5.0 in); Deck: 37 mm (1.5 in) (main, max); 127–25 mm (5.00–0.98 in) (upper); Bulkheads: 76–100 mm (3.0–3.9 in); Turrets: 25 mm (1 in)
- Aircraft carried: 3 × floatplanes (1 × Aichi E13A1 "Jake" and 2 × Mitsubishi F1M2 "Pete"s)
- Aviation facilities: 2 × catapults

Atago (愛宕) was the second vessel in the Takao-class heavy cruisers, active in World War II with the Imperial Japanese Navy (IJN). These were among the largest and most modern cruisers in the Japanese fleet, designed with the intention to form the backbone of a multipurpose long-range strike force. Her sister ships were Takao, Maya, and Chōkai.

== Background ==
The Takao-class ships were approved under the 1927 to 1931 supplementary fiscal year budget, and Atago, like her sister ships, was named after a mountain. In this case, she was named after Mount Atago, located outside Kyoto. Even though Takao was the name ship of the class, Atago was actually finished before Takao.

== Design ==
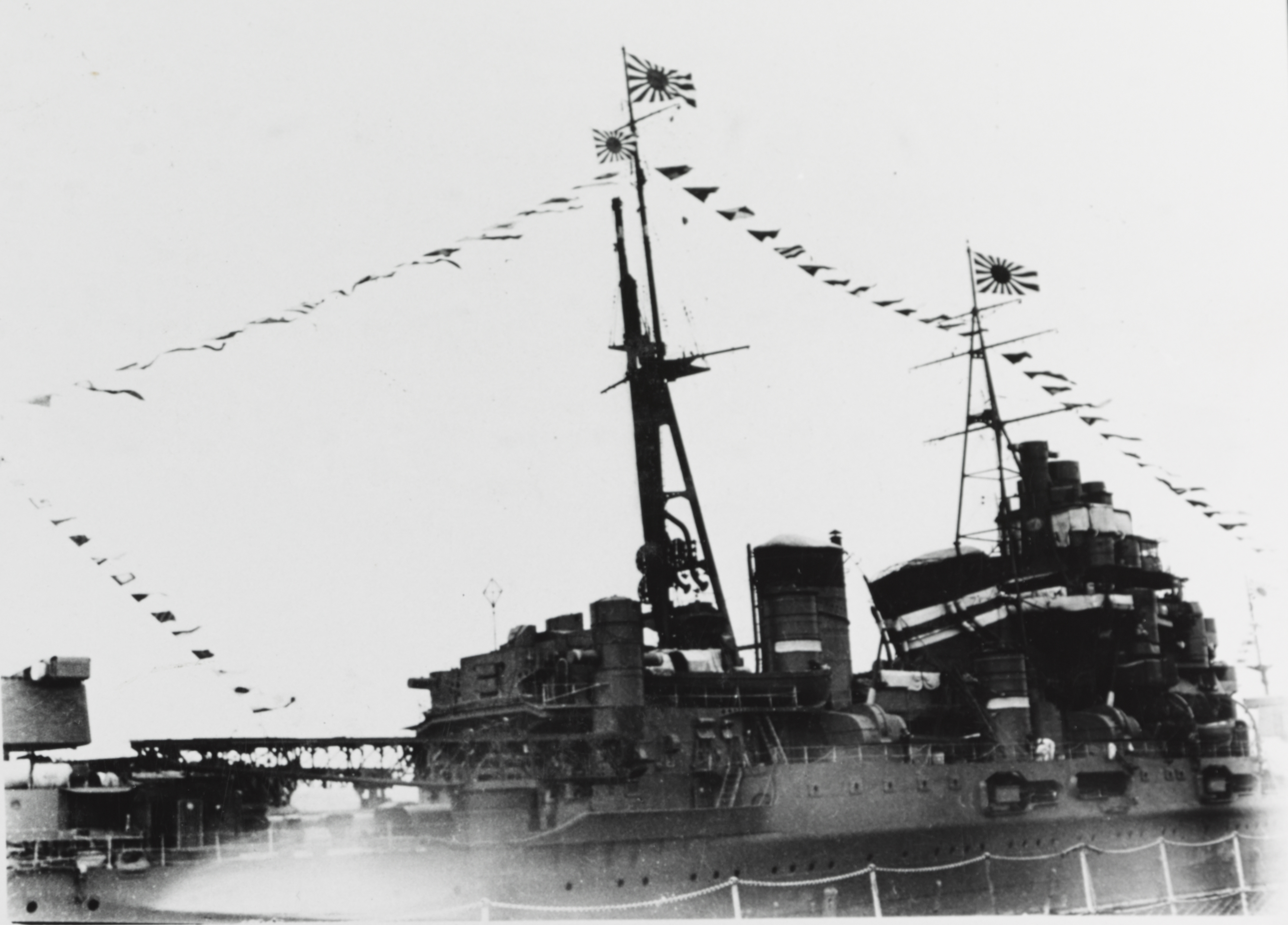
Atago's midship, November 1934

The Takao-class cruisers were an improved version of the previous Myōkō-class cruiser design, incorporating technical elements learned with the development of the experimental light cruiser Yūbari. They had a distinctive profile with a large, raked main smokestack, and a smaller, straight, second smokestack. Intended to address issues with the Myōkō class, the Takao class had thicker armor, dual-purpose main guns which could be used against aircraft, and torpedo launchers moved to the upper deck for greater safety. However, as with its predecessors, the Takao class was also top-heavy.

The Takao class displaced 16,875 t (16,608 long tons). Atago was 203.8 metres (668 ft 8 in) long, with a beam of 20.4 metres (66 ft 11 in), draft of 6.32 metres (20 ft 9 in) and was capable of 35.25 knots (65.28 km/h; 40.56 mph).

Propulsion was by 12 Kampon boilers driving four sets of single-impulse geared turbine engines, with four shafts turning three-bladed propellers. The ship was armored with a 127 mm (5.0 in) side belt, and 35 mm (1.4 in) armored deck, and the bridge was armored with 10 to 16 mm (0.39 to 0.63 in) armored plates.

Atago's main battery was ten Type 3 20 cm naval guns, the heaviest armament of any heavy cruiser in the world at the time, mounted in five twin turrets. Her secondary armament included eight Type 10 12 cm dual purpose guns in four twin mounts on each side, and 16 Type 90 torpedoes in four quadruple launchers. She was very deficient in anti-aircraft capability, with only two 40 mm (1.57 in) anti-aircraft guns. Atago was repeatedly modernized and upgraded throughout her career in order to counter the growing threat of air strikes, and in her final configuration was armed with ten 20 cm/50 3rd Year Type naval guns (5x2), eight Type 89 12.7 cm (5 in) dual purpose guns, (4x2), and 16 Type 93 "Long Lance" torpedoes in four quadruple launchers (plus 8 reloads). Anti-aircraft protection included 24 triple-mount and 12 single-mount Type 96 25 mm AT/AA Guns and four 13.2 mm AA machine guns. Atago was also equipped with an aircraft catapult and carried up to three floatplanes for scouting purposes.

== Service history ==
=== Early operations ===
Atago was laid down at Kure Naval Arsenal on 28 April 1927, launched on 16 June 1930, and commissioned into the Imperial Japanese Navy on 30 March 1932. Although Takao was the lead ship in the class, Atago was actually completed two months earlier.

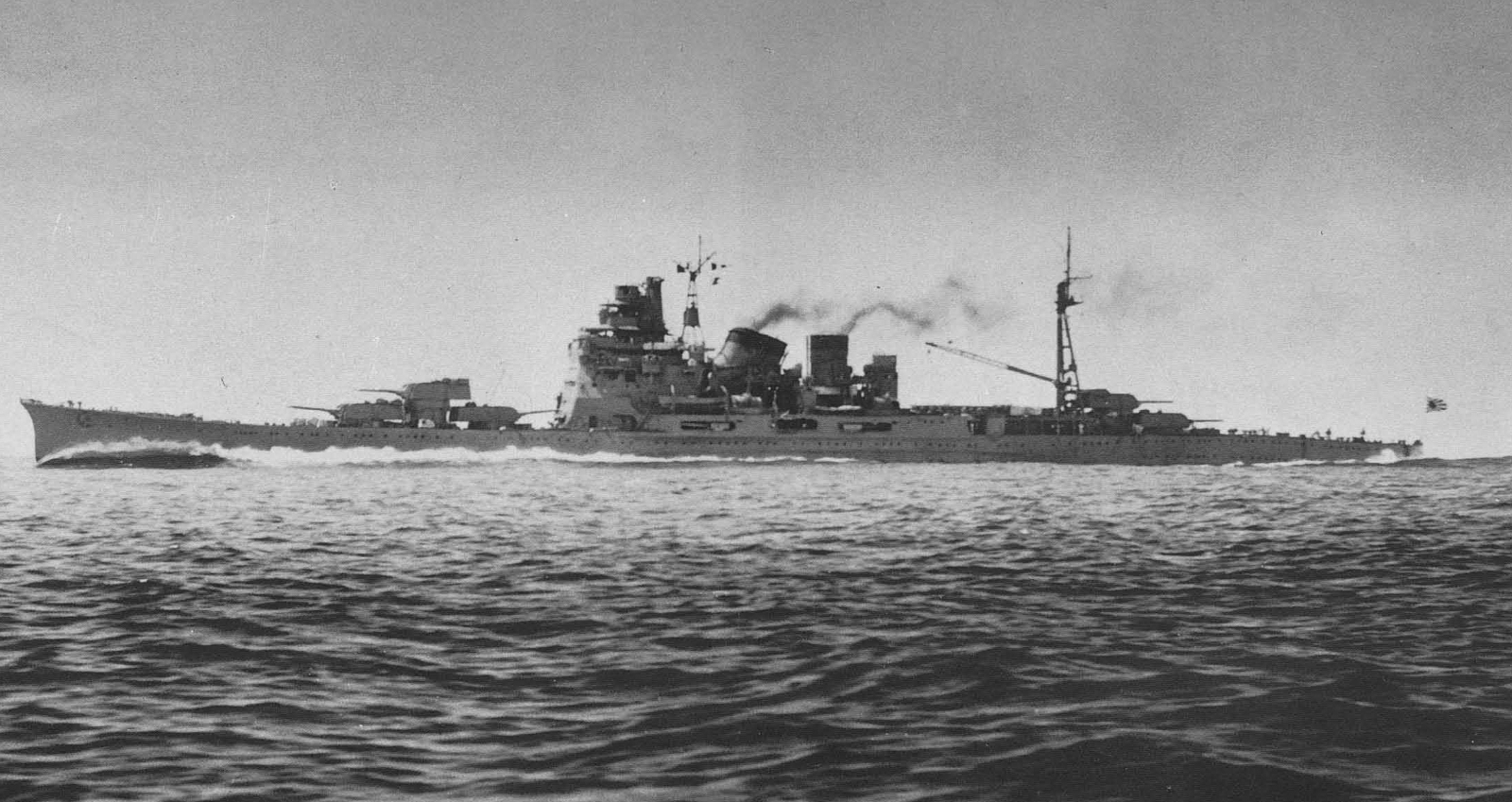
Atago undergoing trials after her first reconstruction, 1939

All of the Takao class were assigned to the Yokosuka Naval District, forming Sentai-4 of the IJN 2nd Fleet, and trained as a unit during the 1930s. On 14 May 1932, the day before he was assassinated, Prime Minister Inukai Tsuyoshi made a tour of inspection of the new cruiser. From 26 to 28 May, Atago hosted Emperor Hirohito on a cruise from Kobe to Etajima and back on the Inland Sea, and the emperor presided over a naval review at Kobe on his return. Atago was commanded by Captain Ibō Takahashi from December 1932 to November 1933, and by Captain Seiichi Itō from April 1936 until he was relieved from 1 December 1936 to 12 July 1937 by Captain Aritomo Gotō.

During this time, issues with their stability and seaworthiness due to the top-heavy design became evident. Takao and Atago were rebuilt, resulting in an improved design: the size of the bridge was reduced, the main mast was relocated aft, and hull bulges were added to improve stability. After rebuilding was completed, Takao and Atago patrolled off the coast of China in 1940 and early 1941. She was commanded by Captain Tomiji Koyanagi from October 1940 to July 1941.

From 11 August 1941, Atago was commanded by Captain Matsuji Ijuin, and on 29 November was made flagship of Vice Admiral Nobutake Kondō's Sentai-4, along with sister ships Maya, Chōkai, and Takao.

=== Pacific War ===
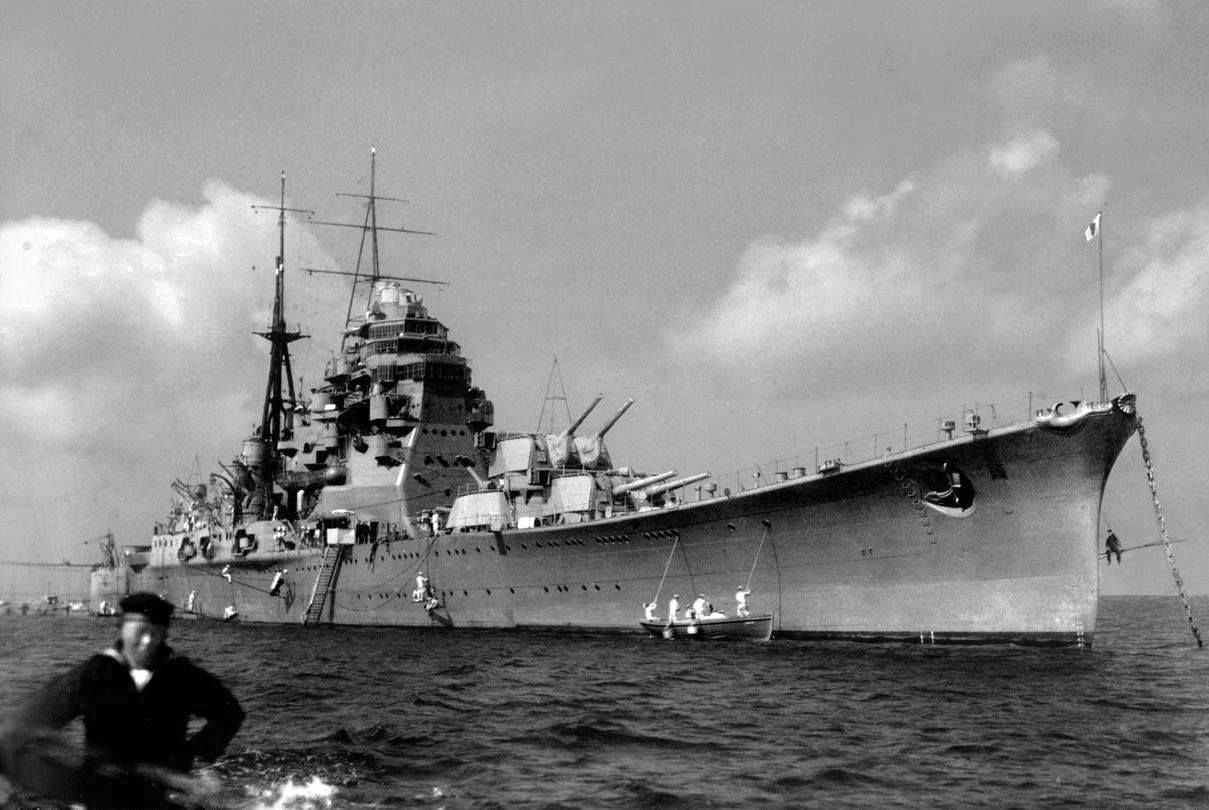
Atago at anchor

At the time of the attack on Pearl Harbor, Atago had sortied from Mako Guard District in the Pescadores Islands to provide support for Japanese landings in the invasion of Malaya and in the invasion of the Philippines.

From January to March 1942, Atago was based out of Palau, and was involved in operations to seize the oil-rich Netherlands East Indies, participating in numerous combat operations, including the Battle of the Java Sea. On 2 March, south of Bali, Atago and Takao sank the old destroyer USS Pillsbury. On 4 March, Atago, Takao and Maya, together with the destroyers Arashi and Nowaki, attacked a convoy which had departed Tjilatjap for Fremantle, Australia, and sank the Royal Australian Navy sloop HMAS Yarra after a 90-minute battle, along with the British tanker Francol, depot ship Anking, and British minesweeper 51. In the same battle, Atago captured the 1030 ton Dutch freighter Duymaer van Twist and 7089 ton freighter Tjisaroea, both of which were later placed into Japanese service. After taking Vice Admiral Kondō on an inspection tour of Japan’s new possessions in the former Netherlands East Indies, Atago returned to Yokosuka Naval District on 17 April 1942, where she was assigned to the unsuccessful pursuit of Admiral William F. Halsey's Task Group 16.2 (TG 16.2) after the Doolittle Raid on Tokyo.

Atago underwent a second modernization program at Yokosuka from 22 April to 21 May 1942 in which her single 12 cm/45 10th Year Type naval guns were replaced with new dual Type 89 12.7 cm (5 in) dual purpose guns, Atago departed for the Battle of Midway, where she was used to escort the transports ferrying the invasion force. She returned from the battle unscathed.

=== Guadalcanal campaign ===
On 11 August 1942, Atago departed Hashirajima together with Sentai-4 with the IJN 2nd Fleet for Truk, from which she was tasked with "Operation Ka", the reinforcement of Guadalcanal from 20 August. During the Battle of the Eastern Solomons (24–25 August), aircraft from the American aircraft carrier USS Wasp shot down two of Aichi E13A1 "Jake" floatplanes from Atago that were engaged in reconnaissance missions, killing all four aircrew members in the two aircraft. Atago also played a very minor role in Battle of Santa Cruz Islands (26–27 October)

In the Second Naval Battle of Guadalcanal (15 November), during a night gun duel with the American battleships USS South Dakota and Washington, Atago and Takao hit South Dakota with seventeen 20 cm (8 in) rounds and one 12.7 cm (5.0 in). The battleship Kirishima also hit South Dakota with a single 14 in (360 mm) round that exploded on her aft No. 3 turret's barbette. South Dakota was damaged, but not sunk. Early in the battle, Atago and Takao each launched eight Type 93 "Long Lance" torpedoes at Washington but they all missed. Atago was damaged slightly as a result of the action, and returned to Kure for repairs on 17 December.

On 25 January 1943, Atago returned to Truk to continue Japanese efforts to hold the Solomon Islands, and eventually to support the evacuation of Guadalcanal. The force consisted of the carriers Zuikaku, Zuihō and Jun'yō, the battleships Kongō and Haruna, heavy cruisers Atago, Takao, Myōkō and Haguro, the light cruisers Nagara and Agano, and 11 destroyers. The Japanese transports were successful in evacuating 11,700 troops from the island.

Atago remained based out of Truk through July 1943, when she returned to Yokosuka Naval Arsenal for her third modernization and refit, which added two triple-mount Type 96 25 mm (0.98 in) anti-aircraft guns.

=== Later battles ===
On 23 August 1943, Atago returned to Truk with Army reinforcements for Rabaul, and continued making sorties supporting Japanese forces in the Solomon Islands through November. In response to American carrier aircraft raiding in the Gilbert Islands, Atago sortied with Vice Admiral Jisaburō Ozawa's fleet to engage the American carriers. The fleet consisted of the aircraft carriers Shōkaku, Zuikaku and Zuihō, the battleships Yamato and Nagato, heavy cruisers Myōkō, Haguro, Tone, Chikuma, Mogami, Atago, Takao, Chōkai and Maya, the light cruiser Agano and fifteen destroyers. Despite extensive searches, this force failed to make contact with the American striking force and returned to Truk.

In response to the Allied landings on Bougainville on 1 November 1943, Atago and several other Japanese cruisers were sent to Rabaul to prepare to attack the Allied landing forces. On 5 November, while refueling at Rabaul, the task force was attacked by 97 planes from the carriers USS Saratoga and Princeton. Atago sustained three near-misses by 500 lb (230 kg) bombs that killed 22 crewmen, including her skipper Captain Nakaoka who was hit by a bomb splinter while on the bridge. On 15 November, Atago returned to Yokosuka for repairs, during which time a Type 22 surface-search radar set, along with additional Type 96 25 mm anti-aircraft guns were installed.

In January 1944, Atago returned to Truk. On 10 February, the cruiser force was attacked by the American submarine USS Permit in a night surface attack, but she missed with four torpedoes. Atago was then reassigned to Sentai-4 based in Palau under Vice Admiral Jisaburō Ozawa's First Mobile Fleet at Palau from 1 March, and was stationed at Davao in the southern Philippines from 1 April. The cruiser force was unsuccessfully attacked by the submarine USS Dace on 6 April.

On 13 June, during the Battle of the Philippine Sea, Atago was part of Vice Admiral Takeo Kurita's Mobile Force Vanguard, deployed from Tawi Tawi in an attempt to force the American 5th Fleet into a "decisive battle" off of Saipan. In what came to be called the "Great Marianas Turkey Shoot", Japanese aircraft attacking US Task Force 58 off of Saipan suffered overwhelming losses. Atago was undamaged from this battle and arrived at Hashirajima on 24 June for a final refit, at which time a Type 13 air-search radar set was installed, along with further four triple- and 32 single-mount Type 96 AA guns (which brought her total to 60) .

=== Sinking in the Battle of Leyte Gulf ===
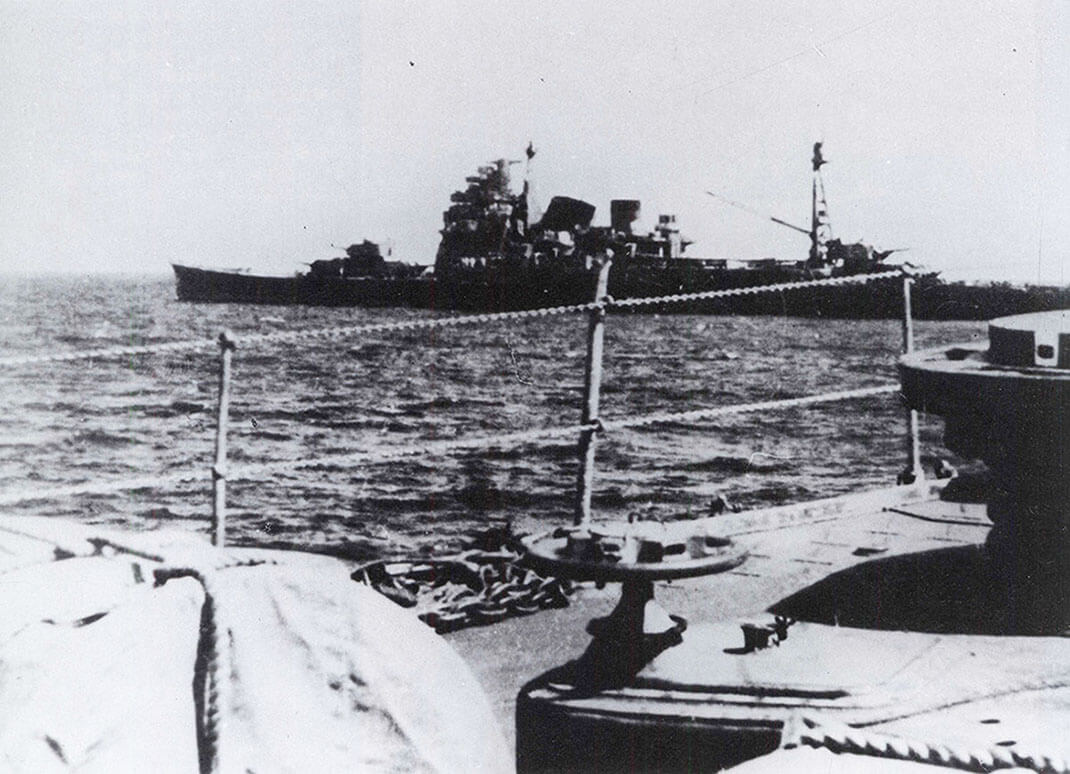
Atago at the Lingga Roads near Singapore, May 1944

From July to October 1944, Atago was flagship of Vice Admiral Takeo Kurita's First Mobile Striking Force, which comprised the major remaining surface force of the Imperial Japanese Navy. The force consisted of five battleships, ten heavy cruisers, two light cruisers, and 19 destroyers, and was based at Lingga Roads near Singapore. The force sortied on 22 October in what would be the last major naval engagement of the war, the Battle of Leyte Gulf. Atago served as flagship for what the Allies termed the "Center Force", and was a part of Sentai-4, along with Chōkai, Takao and Maya. The next day two submarines that had been shadowing the force attacked in the Palawan Passage, near an area known as Dangerous Ground. Atago was one of the ships hit. Four torpedoes fired from the submarine USS Darter, struck Atago, setting her ablaze. She capsized at 05:53, in just 18 minutes, in about 1,800 m (5,900 ft) of water at 09°28′N 117°17′E.

Of Atago's crewmen, there were 529 survivors, including Vice Admiral Kurita, but 360 were killed. 347 crewmen were rescued by the destroyer Kishinami; 171 others were rescued by the destroyer Asashimo. She was removed from the navy list on 20 December.
