= Kumao Imoto =

Japanese military officer

- 井本 熊男
- Born: 1903; Yamaguchi, Japan
- Died: 2000 (aged 96–97)
- Military career
- Allegiance: Japan
- Branch: Imperial Japanese Army; Japan Ground Self-Defense Force
- Rank: Lieutenant general
- Conflicts: World War II; Operation Ke

Kumao Imoto (井本 熊男, Imoto Kumao; 1903 – 2000) was a Japanese military officer and a lieutenant general of the Japan Ground Self-Defense Force.

== Life ==
Imoto was born in Yamaguchi Prefecture in 1903. In 1942, he logged fatal experiments with cyanide gas as a weapon. He delivered the evacuation orders to the Japanese Seventeenth Army in Guadalcanal in the Pacific theatre of the Second World War (Operation Ke). The withdrawal was largely successful.

Imoto was the senior surviving staff officer in Hiroshima after the dropping of the atom bomb, and acted as chief of staff to Field Marshal Shunroku Hata during the immediate aftermath, though wounded.

After World War II, Imoto joined a group headed by Takushiro Hattori that aspired to become the new general staff of the fledging Japan Self-Defense Force. Imoto later reached the rank of Lieutenant General in the Ground Self-Defense Force.

Imoto's book The Great East Asian War, written as an Operations Diary (Dai Toa Senso Sakusen Nisshi) was published in 1979.
