= Tomiji Koyanagi =

Imperial Japanese Navy admiral (1893–1978)

- 小柳 富次
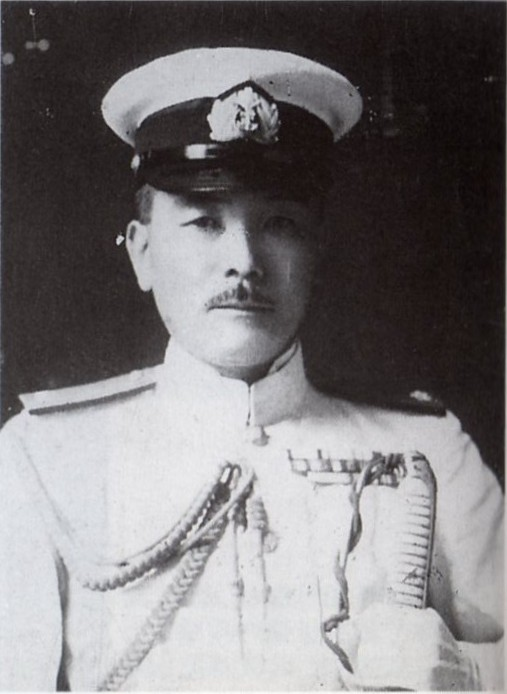
- Born: 16 July 1893; Niigata, Japan
- Died: 6 August 1978 (aged 85)
- Education: Imperial Japanese Naval Academy; Navy Staff College
- Military career
- Allegiance: Empire of Japan
- Branch: Imperial Japanese Navy
- Service years: 1914–1945
- Rank: Vice Admiral
- Units: Aso, Kawachi, Nisshin, Iwate, Kisaragi, Maki, Kuretake, Yamato
- Commands: Wakatake, 1st Destroyer Division, Iwate, 8th Destroyer Division, Atago, Kongō, 2nd Destroyer Squadron, 10th Squadron, Naval Torpedo School, Taura Guard Unit
- Conflicts: World War II; Guadalcanal campaign; Battle of Leyte Gulf

Tomiji Koyanagi (小柳 富次, Koyanagi Tomiji; 16 July 1893 – 6 August 1978) was a vice admiral in the Imperial Japanese Navy during World War II.

== Biography ==
A native of Niigata Prefecture, Koyanagi was a graduate of the 42nd class of the Imperial Japanese Navy Academy in 1914. He served his midshipman duty on the cruiser Aso and battleship Kawachi. Commissioned a sub-lieutenant in 1915, he was assigned to the cruiser Nisshin. After completing torpedo and gunnery schools, he served on the crew of the cruiser Iwate and destroyers Kisaragi, Maki and Kuretake. After graduation from the Navy Staff College in 1926 and his promotion to lieutenant commander, he was assigned his first command: the destroyer Wakatake. He served as an instructor from 1929–1938, specializing in destroyer operations and torpedo warfare, before returning to sea again as the commander of Iwate. In October 1940, he became commander of the cruiser Atago.

At the time of the attack on Pearl Harbor in December 1941, Koyanagi was captain of the battleship Kongō, and he commanded her during the Battle of Midway in June 1942. He was promoted to rear admiral in December 1942.

Later, Koyanagi commanded Destroyer Squadron 10 (DesRon 10) during the Guadalcanal campaign. He was appointed Chief of Staff of the IJN 2nd Fleet under Admiral Takeo Kurita in July 1943.

A strong believer in the Kantai kessen naval doctrine of a decisive battle, Koyanagi criticized the battle plans for the Battle of Leyte Gulf in October 1944, as the plan called for concentrating Japanese attacks on enemy transports rather than warships.

During the Leyte campaign, he was aboard the flagship Atago with Kurita when the fleet was ambushed by the American submarines USS Darter and Dace. Atago was hit by four torpedoes from Darter and capsized at 05:53 on 23 October 1944. Koyanagi survived and transferred to the battleship Yamato with Kurita. He was later severely injured by fragments from a near miss on 26 October and hospitalized until August 1945. Surviving the war, Koyanagi was promoted to vice admiral on 1 November 1945, and retired 10 days later.

After the war, Koyagani was interrogated by Lieutenant Commander James A. Field Jr. of the United States Navy Reserve in Tokyo on 24 October 1945. Field noted that Koyanagi clarified questions that the U.S. Navy strategists had on the Japanese decision to go north rather than enter Leyte Gulf on the morning of 25 October.

Koyanagi died on 6 August 1978.
