= Takushiro Hattori =

Imperial Japanese Army officer

- 服部 卓四郎
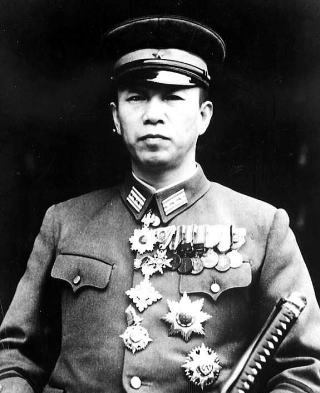
- Born: January 2, 1901; Tsuruoka, Yamagata, Empire of Japan
- Died: April 30, 1960 (aged 59); Japan
- Military career
- Allegiance: Empire of Japan
- Branch: Imperial Japanese Army
- Service years: 1922–1945
- Rank: Colonel
- Conflicts: World War II; Pacific War

Takushiro Hattori (服部 卓四郎, Hattori Takushirō; January 2, 1901 – April 30, 1960) was an Imperial Japanese Army officer and government official. During World War II, he alternately served as the chief of the Army General Staff's Operations Section and Secretary to Prime Minister Hideki Tojo. After the war ended, he served as an adviser on military matters to the postwar Japanese government.

== Early life ==
Takushiro Hattori was born on January 2, 1901, in Tsuruoka, a city in the Japanese prefecture of Yamagata. Upon completing his education at the Imperial Military Academy in 1922, he enrolled in the Japanese Army War College from which he graduated in 1930. In 1935, he traveled to Africa, where he acted as the Japanese military's observer during the Italian invasion of Ethiopia. After returning to Japan, he joined the Army General Staff Office and was placed in charge of mobilization.

By the late 1930s, Hattori was promoted to lieutenant-colonel and became head of the Kwantung Army's Operations Section. In that capacity, he served as one of the driving forces behind the events that triggered the unsuccessful Battle of Khalkhin Gol against the Soviet Union.

== World War II ==
Upon his promotion to colonel and chief of the operations section of the Army General Staff in 1941, Hattori played a key role in planning the Japanese conquest of Western territories during the early years of the Pacific War. In December 1942, he briefly resigned from that position and became Secretary to the Minister of the Army, Tojo, who was at the same time the Prime Minister. In October 1943, Hattori returned to the Army General Staff to reassume his prior position as chief of operations and planned Operation Ichigo. He subsequently remained in this position until a conflict with the Army's Military Affairs Bureau resulted in his transfer to a regimental command in China.

== Later life ==
In occupied Japan after the war, Hattori was associated with the G2 Division, which was responsible for demobilization and for writing the war history of Douglas MacArthur under Major General Charles A. Willoughby.

After the foundation of the National Police Reserve, the first postwar military institution in Japan, Hattori became the leading former officer of the so-called "Hattori Group," which attempted to become the general staff of the new force. Hattori was never commissioned into the force or its successor, the Japan Self-Defense Force, but some of his associates, such as Colonel Kumao Imoto, served in it.

In 1953, he wrote Dai Toa Senso Zenshi (大東亜戦争全史, The Complete History of the Great East Asia War), a large-scale military history of the Pacific War.

== Alleged coup attempt ==
In the years after the war, his name was mentioned in CIA documents as a plotter in a 1952 plan to kill Japanese Prime Minister Shigeru Yoshida. His planned assassination attempt was to precede a National Safety Agency coup in which former military officers, many of whom had been removed in the postwar purge, would seize control of the government. The group, which included Masanobu Tsuji, would then install Ichiro Hatoyama or Taketora Ogata as prime minister. The coup allegedly had support from Charles Willoughby, who was the head of the G-2. Tsuji convinced Hattori to abort the alleged coup attempt because Yoshida belonged to the conservative Liberal Party, which was then definitively disavowed as the result of a withdrawal of US financial support.
