= Kazuo Aoki =

Japanese politician (1889–1982)

- 青木 一男
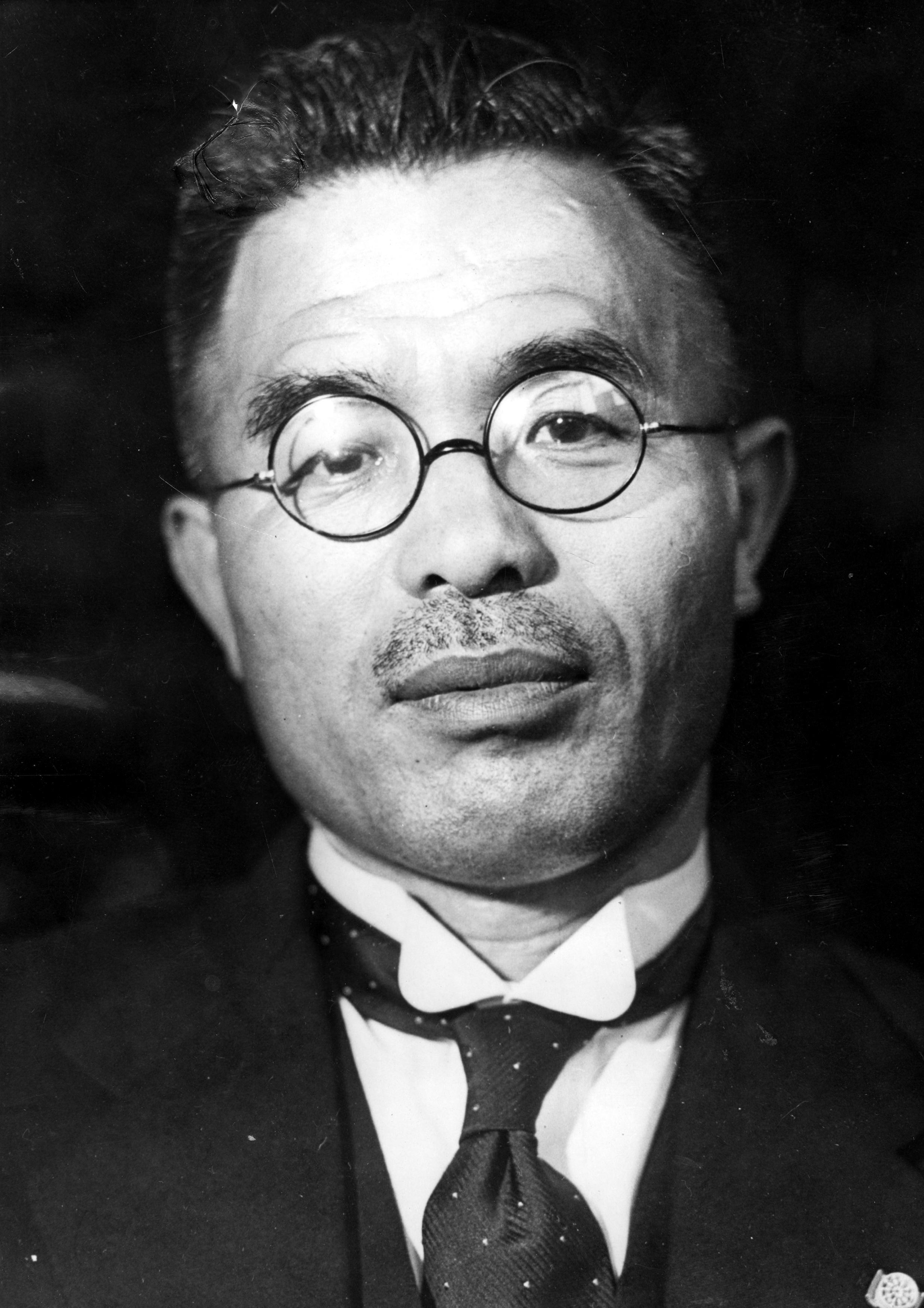

Minister of Greater East Asia
- In office 1 November 1942 – 22 July 1944
- Prime Minister: Hideki Tojo
- Preceded by: Office established
- Succeeded by: Mamoru Shigemitsu

Minister of Finance
- In office 30 July 1939 – 16 January 1940
- Prime Minister: Nobuyuki Abe
- Preceded by: Sōtarō Ishiwata
- Succeeded by: Yukio Sakurauchi

Member of the House of Councillors
- In office 3 May 1953 – 3 July 1977
- Constituency: National district

Member of the House of Peers
- In office 28 August 1939 – 11 January 1946 Nominated by the Emperor

Personal details
- Born: 28 November 1889 Sarashina, Nagano, Japan
- Died: 25 June 1982 (aged 92)
- Party: Liberal Democratic
- Other political affiliations: Independent (1939–1950); Liberal (1950–1955)
- Education: Tokyo Imperial University

Kazuo Aoki (青木 一男, Aoki Kazuo; 28 November 1889 – 25 June 1982) was a bureaucrat and cabinet minister in the Empire of Japan, serving as Minister of Finance, and Minister of Greater East Asia.

== Early life and education ==
Aoki was born to a farming family in Sarashina District, Nagano prefecture (now part of the city of Nagano), and was trained as a lawyer, graduating from the Law School of Tokyo Imperial University in 1916. On graduation, he entered the Ministry of Finance.

== Bureaucratic career ==
Rising rapidly through the ranks, Aoki became chief of the Financial Bureau under Takahashi Korekiyo, who made use of his legal background to have Aoki draft a Foreign Exchange Management Act, which was passed by the Diet of Japan in 1933. Up until that time, Japan had not attempted to implement comprehensive state control over foreign exchange. Aoki followed up on this law with the Rice Control Act (1933) and the Petroleum Control Act (1934), which set the stage for increasing state control over strategic sectors of the economy. He was also on the committee which drafted the National Service Draft Ordinance, which placed the Japanese economy on a war economy footing after the start of the Second Sino-Japanese War. Prime Minister Fumimaro Konoe asked Aoki to become deputy director of the Cabinet Planning Board in 1937, and he became its chairman in 1939. The same year, Aoki was nominated to a seat in the Upper House in the Diet.

== Political career ==
Under Prime Minister Abe, Aoki was Minister of Finance in 1939, while retaining his post as chairman of the Cabinet Planning Board. After the fall of the Abe administration, Aoki was assigned as a special envoy to the Reorganized National Government of China to guide economic policy. He was recalled to Japan under the Tōjō administration to the newly created cabinet post of Minister of Greater East Asia In November 1942, in which position he oversaw the Greater East Asia Conference.

Aoki visited Japanese-occupied Batavia in May 1943, meeting with Mohammad Hatta, who as representative for the Indonesian nationalists, advised him that unless there was a shift in Japanese policy towards granting independence for Indonesia (as it had for Burma and the Philippines), it would be increasingly difficult to maintain popular support for Japan. Aoki promised to raise the issue with Tōjō, who mentioned his intent to grant independence to Malaya, Sumatra, Java, Borneo and Sulawesi within a year in his June 1943 parliamentary speech.

After the surrender of Japan, Aoki was arrested (as were all former government members) by the Supreme Commander of the Allied Powers and held in Sugamo Prison on charges of war crimes. However, he was released in 1948 without coming to trial. Afterwards, Aoki established a private legal practice. In 1953, he ran for a seat in the House of Councilors with the support of the Liberal Party on a nationwide ticket. He was subsequently reelected to the same seat three more times as a member of the Liberal Democratic Party (LDP). He joined a right-wing faction within the LDP in 1960 which was adamantly opposed to Japan’s normalization of relations with the People’s Republic of China and supported Japan’s continued recognition of the Republic of China on Taiwan. He was also a strong supporter of building a nationwide network of highways in Japan, especially the Chūō Expressway.

== Later life ==
After his retirement from politics, Aoki joined the Board of Directors of Shin-etsu Broadcasting, and in 1968 was one of the founders of the Nagano Broadcasting Systems. In 1971, he was awarded the Order of the Rising Sun, 1st class. He published his memoirs in 1981, shortly before his death in 1982.

House of Councillors
Preceded by Tadayasu Iwasawa	Chair of Budget Committee of House of Councillors of Japan; 1953–1954	Succeeded by Eizō Kobayashi
Preceded by Kichinosuke Saigō	Chair of Finance Committee of House of Councillors of Japan; 1955	Succeeded by Shinichi Okazaki
Preceded by Masae Koyanagi	Chair of Cabinet Affairs Committee of House of Councillors of Japan; 1956	Succeeded by Tokuji Kameda
Political offices
Preceded by Sōtarō Ishiwata	Minister of Finance; 1939–1940	Succeeded by Yukio Sakurauchi
New title	Minister of Greater East Asia; 1942–1944	Succeeded by Mamoru Shigemitsu
Party political offices
Preceded by Kamejirō Hayashiya	Chair, Liberal Democratic Party House of Councillors' Committee; 1965–1966	Succeeded by Tarō Hirai
Honorary titles
Preceded by Yoshio Kijima	Oldest member of the House of Councillors of Japan; 1974–1977	Succeeded by Fusae Ichikawa
