= Ministry of Greater East Asia =

Government ministry of Japan from 1942 to 1945

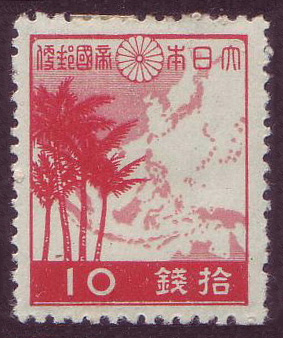
Japanese 10 sen postage stamp depicting a map of the Greater East Asia Co-Prosperity Sphere

The Ministry of Greater East Asia (大東亜省, Daitōashō) was a cabinet-level ministry in the government of the Empire of Japan from 1942 to 1945, established to replace the Ministry of Colonial Affairs. Its purpose was to administer overseas territories obtained by Japan in the Pacific War and to coordinate the establishment and development of the Greater East Asia Co-Prosperity Sphere.

== History and development ==
The Ministry of Greater East Asia was established on 1 November 1942 under the administration of Prime Minister Hideki Tōjō, by absorbing the earlier Ministry of Colonial Affairs (拓務省, Takumushō) and merging it with the East Asia Department and South Pacific Department of the Foreign Ministry and the East Asia Development Board (興亜院, Kōain), which looked after affairs in Japanese-occupied China.

Theoretically, the ministry had political and administrative responsibilities in a vast 4.4-million-square-kilometer (1.7-million-square-mile) area under Japanese influence (extending south 7,200 kilometers (4,500 miles) from the Aleutians to the Solomon Islands, and west 8,000 km (5,000 mi) from Wake Island to Burma and the Andamans), with perhaps a population of over 300 million inhabitants. In reality, wartime conditions meant that the ministry was little more than a paper creation. Aside from the first Minister of Greater East Asia, Kazuo Aoki, all succeeding ministers simultaneously held the portfolio of the Foreign Minister.

The Ministry of Greater East Asia was abolished on 26 August 1945 by order of the Supreme Commander for the Allied Powers after the surrender of Japan brought an end to Japan's overseas holdings.

== List of ministers of Greater East Asia ==
	Portrait	Name	Term of office		Cabinet
1		Kazuo Aoki 青木 一男	1 November 1942	22 July 1944	Tōjō
2		Mamoru Shigemitsu 重光 葵	22 July 1944	7 April 1945	Koiso
3		Kantarō Suzuki 鈴木 貫太郎	7 April 1945	9 April 1945	Suzuki
4		Shigenori Tōgō 東郷茂徳	9 April 1945	17 August 1945	Suzuki
5		Mamoru Shigemitsu 重光 葵	17 August 1945	25 August 1945	Higashikuni

== See also ==
- Greater East Asia Conference
- Greater East Asia Co-Prosperity Sphere
- Japanese colonial empire
- List of territories occupied by Imperial Japan
