= Greater East Asia Conference =

International conference held in 1943

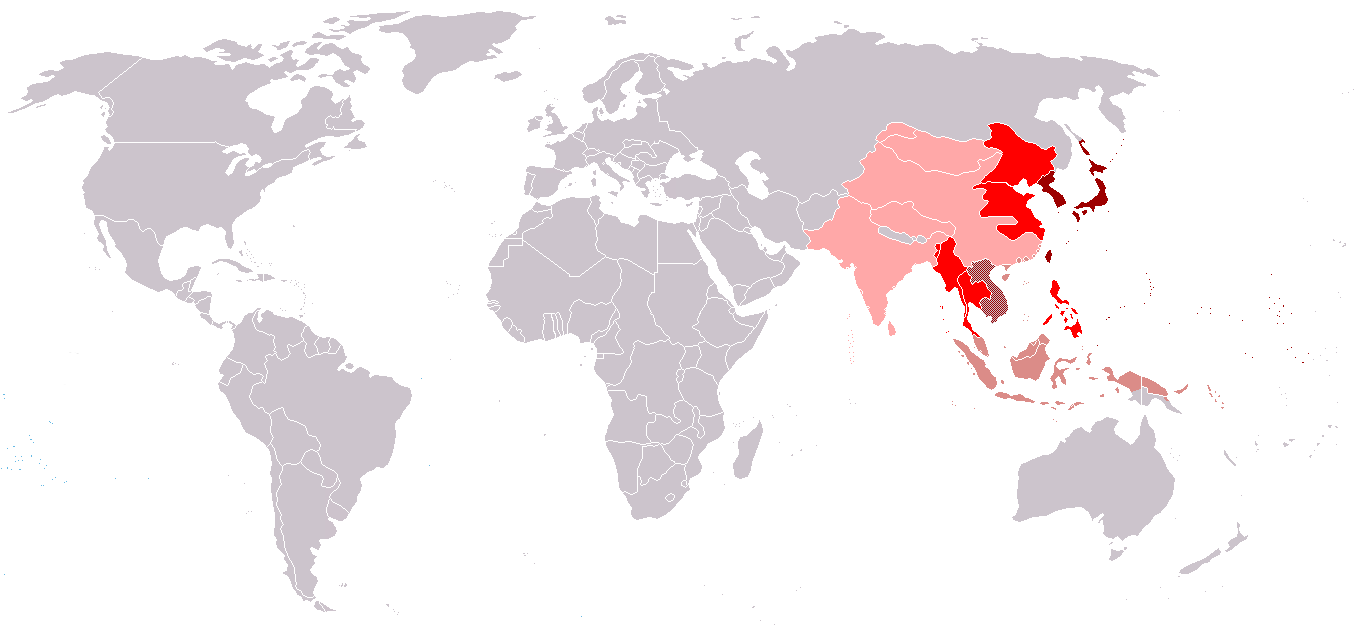
Member states of the Greater East Asia Conference : Japan and colonies : Other territories occupied by Japan : Territories disputed and claimed by Japan

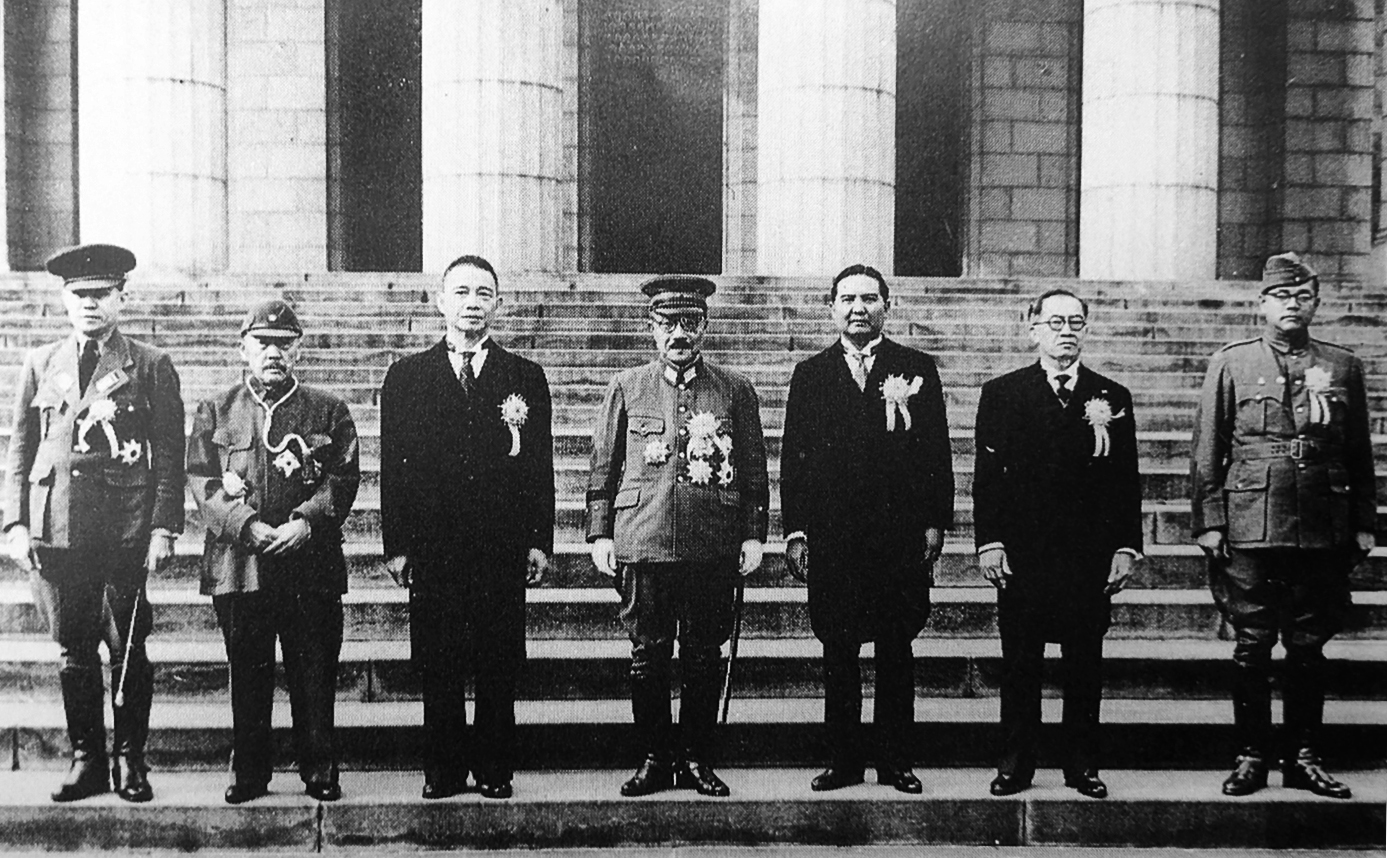
Participants of the Greater East Asia Conference from left to right: Ba Maw, Zhang Jinghui, Wang Jingwei, Hideki Tōjō, Wan Waithayakon, Jose P. Laurel, and Subhas Chandra Bose

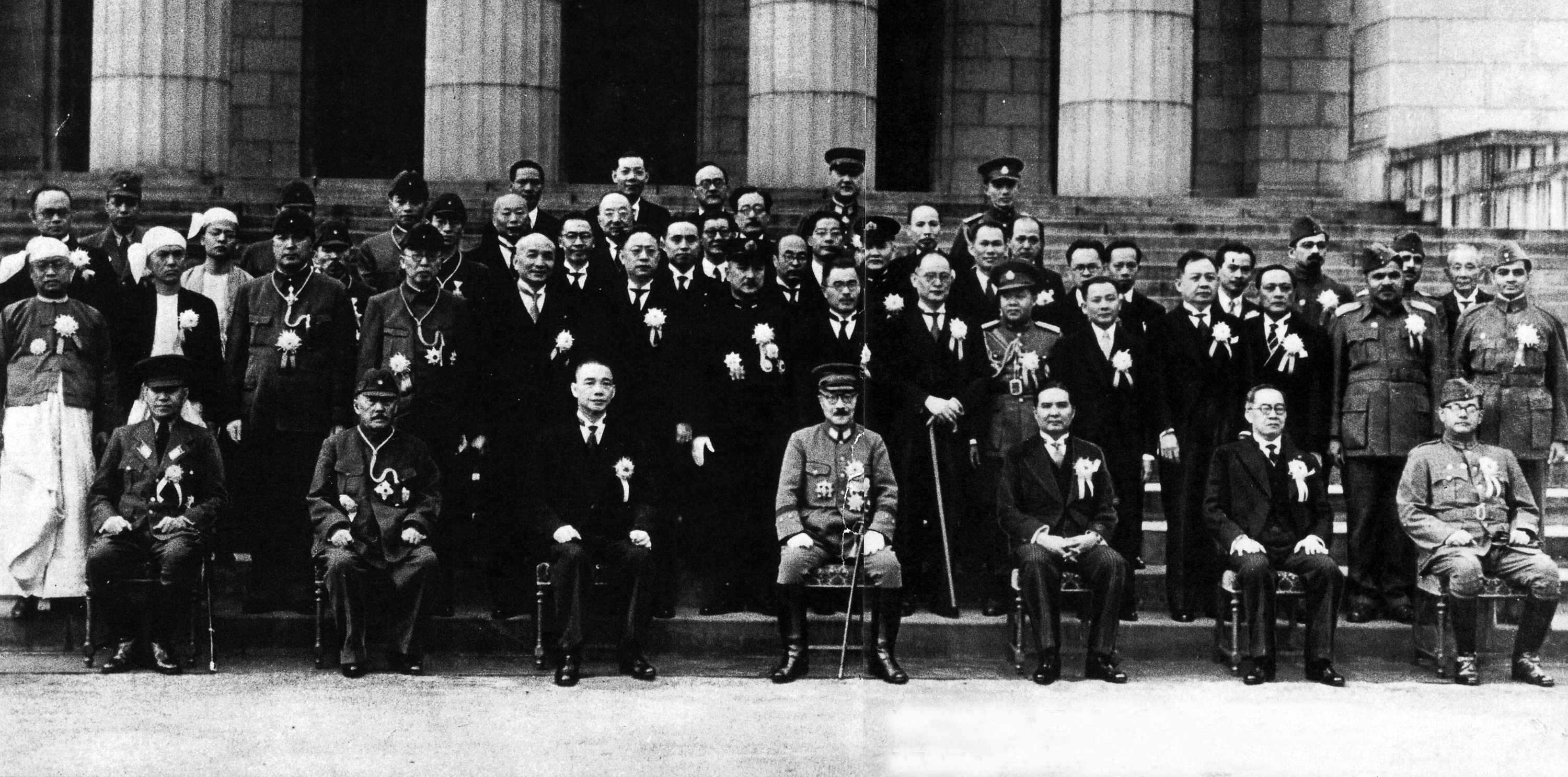
Leaders and delegations from the Greater East Asia Conference (photo taken in front of the Imperial House)

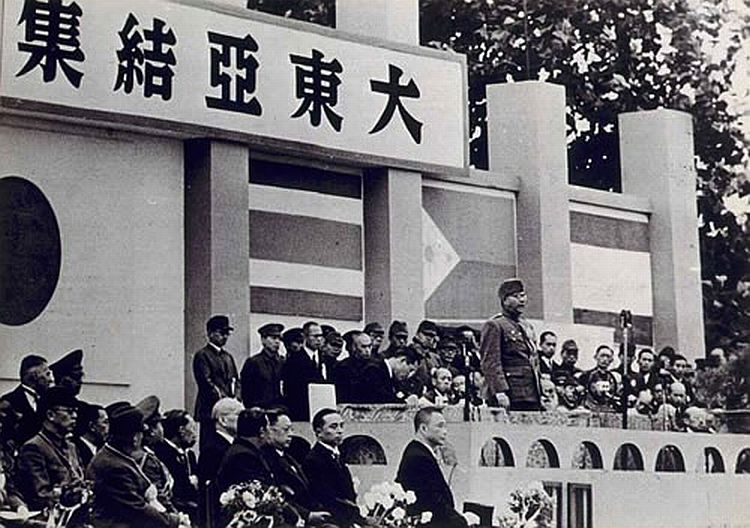
Subhas Chandra Bose giving a speech

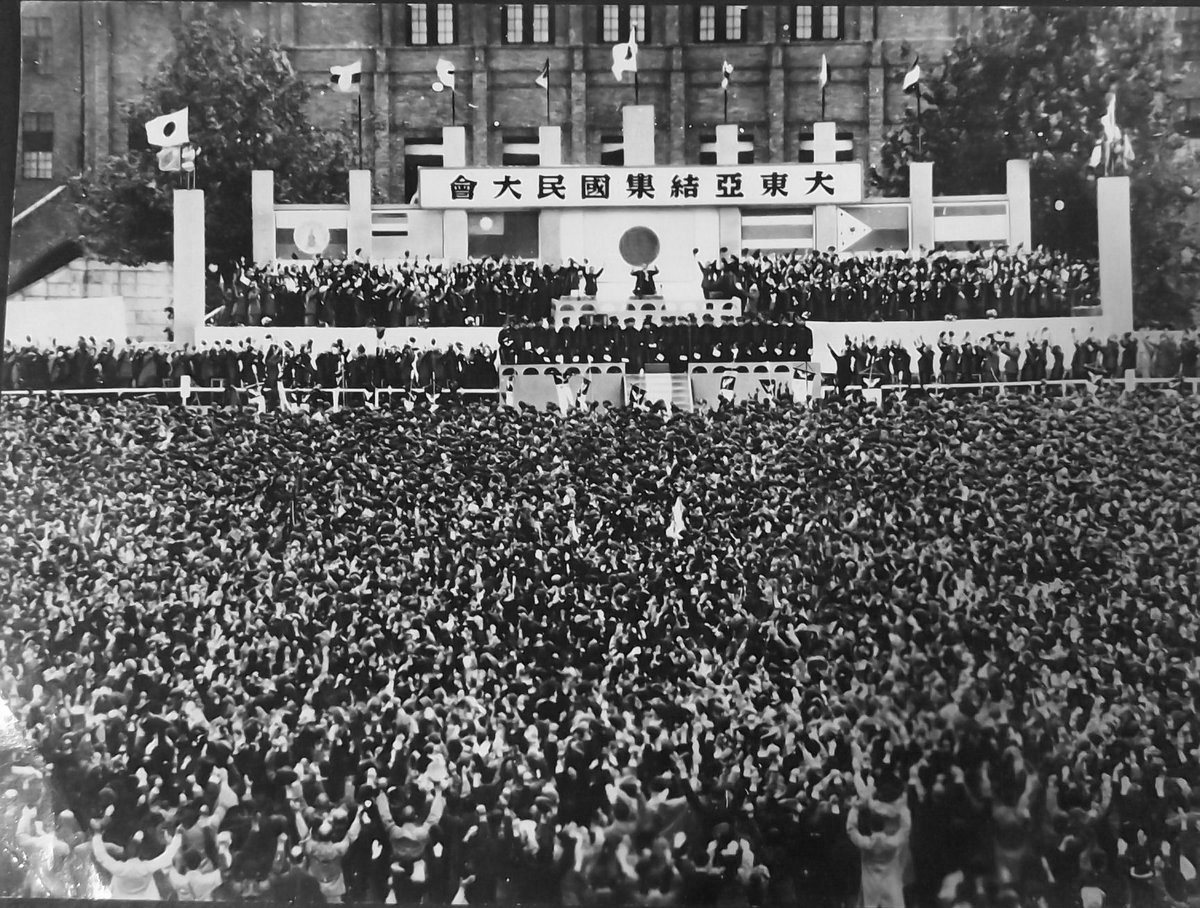
View of the Parliament of the facade of the building and the podium decorated with flags of the participating countries of the conference, from the crowd

The Greater East Asia Conference (大東亞會議, Dai Tōa Kaigi) was an international summit held in Tokyo from 5 to 6 November 1943, in which the Empire of Japan hosted leading politicians of various component parts of the Greater East Asia Co-Prosperity Sphere. The event was also referred to as the Tokyo Conference.

The conference addressed few issues of substance, but was intended from the start as a propaganda show piece, to convince members of Japan's commitments to the Pan-Asianism ideal, with an emphasis on their role as the "liberator" of Asia from Western imperialism.

== Background ==
Since the Russo-Japanese War of 1904–05, people in the Asian nations ruled by the "white powers" such as India, Vietnam, etc. and those that had "unequal treaties" forced upon them like China and Korea had always looked to Japan as a role model, the first Asian nation that had modernised and defeated a European nation, Russia, in modern times. Throughout the 1920s-30s, Japanese newspapers had always given extensive coverage to the racist laws meant to exclude Asian immigrants such as the "White Australia" policy; the anti-Asian immigrant laws by the U.S. Congress in 1882, 1917, and 1924; and the "White Canada" policy together with reports about how Asians suffered from prejudice in the United States, Canada, Australia, and European colonies in Asia. Most Japanese at the time seemed to have sincerely believed that Japan was a uniquely virtuous nation ruled over by an emperor who was a living god, and thus the font of all goodness in the world. Because the emperor was worshiped as a living god who was morally "pure" and "just", the self-perception in Japan was that the Japanese state could never do anything wrong as under the leadership of the divine Emperor, everything the Japanese state did was "just". For this reason, Japanese people were predisposed to view any war as "just" and "moral" as the divine Emperor could never wage an "unjust" war. Within this context, many Japanese believed it was the "mission" of Japan to end the domination of "white" nations in Asia, and free the other Asians suffering under the rule of the "white powers". A pamphlet titled Read this Alone-and the War Can Be Won issued to all Japanese troops and sailors in December 1941 read: "These white people may expect, from the moment they issue from their mothers' wombs, to be allotted a score or so of natives as their personal slaves. Is this really God's will?". Japanese propaganda stressed the theme of the mistreatment of Asians by whites to motivate their troops and sailors.

Starting in 1931, Japan had always sought to justify its imperialism under the grounds of Pan-Asianism. The war with China, which began in 1937, was portrayed as an effort to unite the Chinese and Japanese peoples together in Pan-Asian friendship, to bring the "imperial way" to China, which justified "compassionate killing" as the Japanese sought to kill the "few trouble-makers" in China who were alleged to be causing all the problems in Sino-Japanese relations. As such, Japanese propaganda had proclaimed that the Imperial Army, guided by the "emperor's benevolence" had come to China to engage in "compassionate killing" for the good of the Chinese people. In 1941, when Japan declared war on the United States and several European nations which possessed colonies in Asia, the Japanese portrayed themselves as engaging in a war of liberation on behalf of all the peoples of Asia. In particular, there was a marked racism to Japanese propaganda with the Japanese government issuing cartoons depicting the Western powers as "white devils" or "white demons", complete with claws, fangs, horns, and tails. The Japanese government depicted the war as a race war between the benevolent Asians led by Japan, the most powerful Asian country against the Americans and Europeans, who were portrayed as sub-human "white devils". At times, Japanese leaders spoke like they believed their own propaganda about whites being in a process of racial degeneration and were actually turning into the drooling, snarling demonical creatures depicted in their cartoons. Thus, Japanese Foreign Minister Yōsuke Matsuoka had stated in a 1940 press conference that "the mission of the Yamato race is to prevent the human race from becoming devilish, to rescue it from destruction and lead it to the light of the world". At least some people within the Asian colonies of the European powers had welcomed the Japanese as liberators from the Europeans. In the Dutch East Indies, the nationalist leader Sukarno in 1942 had created the formula of the "Three A's": Japan the Light of Asia, Japan the Protector of Asia, and Japan the Leader of Asia.

But for all their talk about creating a Greater East Asia Co-Prosperity Sphere where all the Asian peoples would live together as brothers and sisters, in reality as shown by a July 1943 planning document titled An Investigation of Global Policy with the Yamato Race as Nucleus, the Japanese saw themselves as the racially superior "Great Yamato race", which was naturally destined to forever dominate the other racially inferior Asian peoples. Prior to the Greater East Asia Conference, Japan had made vague promises of independence to various anti-colonial pro-independence organisations in the territories it had overrun, but aside from a number of obvious puppet states set up in China, these promises had not been fulfilled. Now, with the tide of the Pacific War turning against Japan, bureaucrats in the Ministry of Foreign Affairs and supporters of the Pan-Asian philosophy within the government and military pushed forward a program to grant rapid "independence" to various parts of Asia in an effort to increase local resistance to the Allies and trigger the latter's return and to boost local support for the Japanese war effort. The Japanese military leadership agreed in principle, understanding the propaganda value of such a move, but the level of "independence" the military had in mind for the various territories was even less than that enjoyed by Manchukuo. Several components of the Greater East Asia Co-Prosperity Sphere were not represented. In early 1943, the Japanese established the Ministry of Greater East Asia to conduct relations with the supposedly independent states of the "Greater East Asia Co-Prosperity Sphere".

American historian Gerhard Weinberg writes about the establishment of the Greater East Asia Ministry: "This step itself showed that the periodic announcements from Tokyo that the peoples of Asia were to be liberated and allowed to determine their own fate were a sham and were so intended. If any of the territories nominally declared to be independent were in fact to be so, they could obviously be dealt with by the Foreign Ministry, which existed precisely for the purpose of handling relations with independent states". Korea and Taiwan had long been annexed as external territories of the Empire of Japan, and there were no plans to extend any form of political autonomy or even nominal independence. Vietnamese and Cambodian delegates were not invited for fear of offending the Vichy French regime, which maintained a legal claim to French Indochina and to which Japan was still formally allied. The issue of Malaya and the Dutch East Indies was complex. Large portions were under occupation by the Imperial Japanese Army or Imperial Japanese Navy, and the organisers of the Greater East Asia Conference were dismayed by the unilateral decision of the Imperial General Headquarters to annex these territories to the Japanese Empire on May 31, 1943, rather than to grant nominal independence. This action considerably undermined efforts to portray Japan as the "liberator" of the Asian peoples. Indonesian independence leaders Sukarno and Mohammad Hatta were invited to Tokyo shortly after the close of the conference for informal meetings, but were not allowed to participate in the conference itself. In the end, seven countries (including Japan) participated.

== Participants ==
There were six "independent" participants and one observer that attended the Greater East Asia Conference. These were:

- Hideki Tōjō, Prime Minister of the Empire of Japan
- Zhang Jinghui, Prime Minister of Manchukuo
- Wang Jingwei, President of the Republic of China
- Ba Maw, Head of State and Prime Minister of the State of Burma
- Subhas Chandra Bose, Head of State of the Provisional Government of Free India
- Jose P. Laurel, President of the Republic of the Philippines
- Wan Waithayakon, envoy from the Kingdom of Thailand

Strictly speaking, Subhas Chandra Bose was present only as an "observer", since India was a British colony. Furthermore, Thailand sent Prince Wan Waithayakon in place of Prime Minister Plaek Phibunsongkhram to emphasise that Thailand was not a country under Japanese domination. He was also worried that he might be ousted should he leave Bangkok. Tōjō greeted them with a speech praising the "spiritual essence" of Asia, as opposed to the "materialistic civilisation" of the West. Their meeting was characterised by praise of solidarity and condemnation of Western imperialism, but without practical plans for either economic development or integration. As Korea had been annexed by Japan in 1910, there was no official Korean delegation to the conference, but a number of leading Korean intellectuals such as historian Choe Nam-seon, novelist Yi Gwangsu, and children's writer Ma Haesong attended the conference as part of the Japanese delegation to deliver speeches praising Japan and to express their thanks to the Japanese for colonising Korea. The purpose of these speeches was to reassure other Asian peoples about their future in a Japanese-dominated Greater East Asia Co-Prosperity Sphere. The fact that Choe and Yi had once been Korean independence activists who had been bitterly opposed to Japanese rule made their presence at the conference a propaganda coup for the Japanese government, as it seemed to show that Japanese imperialism was so beneficial to the peoples subjected to Japan that even those who once been opposed to the Japanese had now seen the errors of their ways. The Korean delegates also spoke passionately against the "Western devils", describing them as the "most deadly enemies of Asian civilisation that had ever existed", and praising Japan for its role in standing up to them.

== Themes ==
The major theme of the conference was for the need for all the Asian peoples to rally behind Japan and offer an inspiring example of Pan-Asian idealism against the evil "white devils". American historian John W. Dower writes that the various delegates "...placed the war in the East-versus-the West, Oriental-versus-the Occidental, and ultimately a blood-versus-blood context." Ba Maw of Burma stated: "My Asian blood has always called out to other Asians... This is not the time to think with other minds, this is the time to think with our blood, and this thinking has brought me from Burma to Japan." Ba Maw later remembered: "We were Asians rediscovering Asia". Hideki Tōjō of Japan stated in his speech: "It is an incontrovertible fact that the nations of Greater East Asia are bound in every respect by ties of an inseparable relationship". Jose Laurel of the Philippines in his speech claimed that no-one in the world could "stop or delay the acquisition of one billion Asians of the free and untrammelled right and opportunity to shape their own destiny". Subhas Chandra Bose of India declared: "If our Allies were to go down, there will be no hope for India to be free for at least 100 years". A major irony of the conference was that despite all of the vehement talk condemning the "Anglo-Saxons", English was the language of the conference as it was the only common language of the various delegates from all over Asia. Bose recalled that the atmosphere at the conference was like a "family gathering" as everybody was Asian, and he felt like they belonged together. Many Indians supported Japan, and throughout the conference Indian university students studying in Japan mobbed Bose like an idol. The Filipino ambassador, representing the Laurel government stated "the time has come for the Filipinos to disregard Anglo-Saxon civilisation and its enervating influence... and to recapture their charm and original virtues as an Oriental people."

As Japan had about two million soldiers fighting in China, making it by far the largest theatre of operations for Japan, by 1943 the Tōjō cabinet had decided to make peace with China to focus on fighting the Americans. The idea of peace with China had first been raised in early 1943, but Tōjō had encountered fierce resistance with the Japanese elite to giving up any of the Japanese "rights and interests" in China, which were the only conceivable basis for making peace with China. To square this circle about how to make peace with China without surrendering any of the Japanese "rights and interests" in China, it was believed in Tokyo that a major demonstration of Pan-Asianism would lead the Chinese to make peace with Japan, and join the Japanese against their common enemies, the "white devils". Thus, a major theme of the conference was by being allied to the United States and the United Kingdom, Chiang Kai-shek was not a proper Asian as no Asian would ally himself with the "white devils" against other Asians. Weinberg noted that in regards to Japanese propaganda in China, "the Japanese had in effect written off any prospects for propaganda in China by their atrocious conduct in the country", but in the rest of Asia the slogan "Asia for Asians" had much "resonance" as many people in Southeast Asia had no love for the various Western powers who ruled over them.

Ba Maw maintained later on the Pan-Asian spirit of the 1943 conference lived after the war, becoming the basis of the 1955 Bandung Conference. Indian historian Pankaj Mishra praised the Greater East Asia Conference as the part of the coming together process of the Asian peoples against the whites as "...the Japanese had revealed how deep the roots of anti-Westernism went and how quickly Asians could seize power from their European tormentors". Mishra argued that the behaviour of the "white powers" towards their Asian colonies, which according to him had been led by marked amount of racism, meant that it was natural for Asians to look to Japan as a liberator from their colonial rulers.

== Joint Declaration ==
The Joint Declaration of the Greater East Asia Conference was published as follows:

It is the basic principle for the establishment of world peace that the nations of the world have each its proper place, and enjoy prosperity in common through mutual aid and assistance.

The United States of America and the British Empire have in seeking their own prosperity oppressed other nations and peoples. Especially in East Asia, they indulged in insatiable aggression and exploitation, and sought to satisfy their inordinate ambition of enslaving the entire region, and finally they came to menace seriously the stability of East Asia. Herein lies the cause of the recent war. The countries of Greater East Asia, with a view to contributing to the cause of world peace, undertake to cooperate toward prosecuting the War of Greater East Asia to a successful conclusion, liberating their region from the yoke of British-American domination, and ensuring their self-existence and self-defence, and in constructing a Greater East Asia in accordance with the following principles:

- The countries of Greater East Asia through mutual cooperation will ensure the stability of their region and construct an order of common prosperity and well-being based upon justice.
- The countries of Greater East Asia will ensure the fraternity of nations in their region, by respecting one another's sovereignty and independence and practicing mutual assistance and amity.
- The countries of Greater East Asia by respecting one another's traditions and developing the creative faculties of each race, will enhance the culture and civilisation of Greater East Asia.
- The countries of Greater East Asia will endeavour to accelerate their economic development through close cooperation upon a basis of reciprocity and to promote thereby the general prosperity of their region.
- The countries of Greater East Asia will cultivate friendly relations with all the countries of the world, and work for the abolition of racial discrimination, the promotion of cultural intercourse and the opening of resources throughout the world, and contribute thereby to the progress of mankind.

== Assessment ==
The conference and the formal declaration adhered to on November 6 was little more than a propaganda gesture designed to rally regional support for the next stage of the war, outlining the ideals of which it was fought. However, the conference marked a turning point in Japanese foreign policy and relations with other Asian nations. The defeat of Japanese forces on Guadalcanal and an increasing awareness of the limitations to Japanese military strength led the Japanese civilian leadership to realise that a framework based on cooperation, rather than one of colonial domination, would enable a greater mobilisation of manpower and resources against the resurgent Allied forces. It was also the start of efforts to create a framework that would allow for some form of diplomatic compromise should the military solution fail altogether. However these moves came too late to save the empire, which surrendered to the Allies less than two years after the conference.

Embarrassed by the fact in October 1943, the United Kingdom and the United States had signed treaties giving up their extraterritorial concessions and rights in China, on 9 January 1944 Japan signed a treaty with the regime of Wang Jingwei giving up its extraterritorial rights in China. Emperor Hirohito thought this treaty was so significant that he had his younger brother Prince Mikasa sign the treaty in Nanjing on his behalf. Chinese public opinion was unimpressed with this attempt to put Sino-Japanese relations on a new footing, not the least because the treaty did not change the relationship between Wang and his Japanese masters. Hirohito did not accept the idea of national self-determination, and never called for any changes to Japanese policies in Korea and Taiwan, where the Japanese state had a policy of imposing the Japanese language and culture on the Koreans and Taiwanese, which somewhat undercut the Pan-Asian rhetoric. The emperor viewed Asia through the notion of "place", meaning that all of the Asian peoples were different races that had a proper "place" within a Japanese-dominated "co-prosperity sphere" in Asia, with the Japanese as the leading race. The change to a more co-operative relationship between Japan and the other Asian peoples in 1943-45 were largely cosmetic and were made in response to a losing war as the Allied forces inflicted defeat after defeat on the Japanese on land, sea, and in the air.

Dower writes that Japan's Pan-Asian claims were just a "myth", and that the Japanese were as every bit as racist and exploitive towards other Asians as the "white powers" that they were fighting against, and even more brutal as the Japanese treated their supposed Asian brothers and sisters with an appalling ruthlessness. In 1944–45, the Burmese welcomed Allied forces reentering Japanese-occupied Burma as liberators from the Japanese. Moreover, the reality of Japanese rule belied the idealistic statements made at the Greater East Asia Conference. Whenever they went, Japanese soldiers and sailors had a routine habit of publicly slapping the faces of other Asians as a way of showing who were the "Great Yamato race" and who were not. During the war, 670,000 Koreans and 41,862 Chinese were taken to work as slave labour under the most degrading conditions in Japan; the majority did not survive the experience. About 60,000 people from Burma, China, Thailand, Malaya, and the Dutch East Indies together with some 15,000 British, Australian, American, Indian, and Dutch prisoners of war died while building the "Burma Death Railway". The Japanese treatment of slaves was based upon an old Japanese proverb for the proper treatment of slaves: ikasazu korasazu (do not let them live, do not let them die). In China between 1937 and 1945, the Japanese were responsible for the deaths of between 8 and 9 million Chinese.

== See also ==
- Afro–Asian Conference
- East Asia Development Board
- Greater East Asia Railroad
- List of East Asian leaders in the Japanese sphere of influence (1931–1945)
- Ministry of Greater East Asia
