= Japan–Korea Undersea Tunnel =

Proposed tunnel connecting Japan and Korea

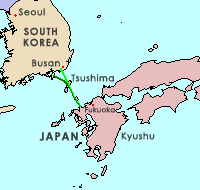
- The proposed routes for the Japan–Korea undersea tunnel.

Japanese name
- Kanji: 日韓トンネル
Transcriptions
- Romanization: Nikkan Tonneru

Korean name
- Hangul: 한일 해저 터널
- Hanja: 韓日 海底 터널
Transcriptions
- Revised Romanization: Hanil Haejeo Teoneol
- McCune–Reischauer: Hanil Haejŏ T'ŏnŏl

The Japan–Korea Undersea Tunnel, also known as the Korea–Japan Undersea Tunnel, is a proposed tunnel project to connect Japan with South Korea via an undersea tunnel crossing the Korea Strait that would use the strait islands of Iki and Tsushima, a straight-line distance of approximately 128 kilometers (80 mi) at its shortest.

The proposed tunnel would be more than 200 km (120 mi) long and serve a portion of freight traffic, as well as some of the approximately 20,000 people who travel daily between the countries.

The proposal, which had been under discussion intermittently since 1917, was followed by more concrete planning during the early 1940s. It was not pursued, however, until after World War II.

In early 2008, the proposal was a subject of renewed discussions by 10 senior Japanese lawmakers, who established a new committee to pursue it. This was followed by a study group from both countries in early 2009, which agreed to form a committee for the creation of specific construction plans. Its head, Huh Moon-do, a former director of South Korea's National Unification Board and a key member of the former Chun Doo-hwan government, said that the tunnel would help regional economics and would "play a key role in pursuing bilateral free trade talks," which are currently stalled.

In 2009, joint studies estimated high construction costs for a Japan-South Korea tunnel and concluded it would not be economically feasible supported by another South Korean study, which in 2011 found proposed tunnels to Japan and China financially unfeasible. The Korea Transport Institute estimated combined construction costs at ₩100 trillion (US$90 billion), with a very low benefit-to-cost ratio.

In 2022, the assassination of Shinzo Abe and subsequent investigation of the Unification Church, which collected donations for the tunnel, led politicians to distance themselves from the project. The Unification Church are strong proponents of the tunnel.

== Proposal history ==
=== Early origins ===
A tunnel between Japan and Korea has been discussed since the early 20th century, when Korea was a colony of the Japanese Empire having been annexed in 1910.

A very early discussion on such a tunnel was conducted in 1917 by the Imperial Japanese Army General Staff officer Kuniaki Koiso. Another early proposal for the project originated in the late 1930s, as part of the Greater East Asia Railroad. In 1938, Imperial Japan's Ministry of Communications reportedly decided on a preliminary survey of the sea bottom between Japan and Korea. During World War II, the Imperial Japanese government actively pursued the project to connect it with the Korean Peninsula and, ultimately, the rest of the Asian continent.

In 1939, a Japanese Railway official, Yumoto Noboru, wrote of a trans-Eurasian railway to link Japan to its Axis partner, Germany, and proposed the construction of an undersea tunnel to connect Japan with Korea via the island of Tsushima. It was argued a combined undersea tunnel and land link would help safeguard Japanese communications and shipments to and from Europe, which would be imperiled by the Pacific War. (Note: Yumoto's concerns for the dangers posed to Axis transport and communication links were valid. With the increasing Allied control of the Indian and Pacific Oceans, surface shipping was severely restricted. Blair, Clay. Silent Victory (Lippincott, 1975), passim.)

Noboru's writing was joined in the same year by a recommendation from Mr. Kuwabara, who would later assist in the creation of the undersea Seikan Tunnel, spanning the strait between Honshu and Hokkaido in northern Japan. In 1939, Kuwabara made the same recommendation of tunneling across the strait and connecting to a "Cross Asian Railway." Studies were soon conducted by the Japanese government on a possible Kampu (Shimonoseki-Busan) tunnel between the Japanese home islands and South Korea. The plan came under serious consideration starting in 1941.

In September 1940, the Japanese Cabinet issued its overview "Outline of National Spatial Planning" study, which outlined its long-term goals for the development of its occupied conquests and spheres of influence in Asia, which it termed the "Greater East Asia Co-Prosperity." It further refined its plans with the outbreak of hostilities with the United States and was bent on increasing its geopolitical and ethnic ties with mainland Asia through a vastly expanded rail and marine network, with special emphasis on the Korean Peninsula land bridge to connect it with its colonies. To achieve its objectives, Japan had plans that called for "a giant leap forward" in its transportation and communications infrastructures, including Shinkansen bullet trains, so that it could integrate all of its colonial economies and ensure the transport of war materials and other necessary supplies to and from the home islands. That coincided with the planning and the development of the dangan ressha ("bullet train") system by a Japanese chief rail engineer, Shima Yasujiro, who concurred on the links between Tokyo, Korea, and China.

In 1941, geological surveys were conducted on Tsushima Island, and test bores were sunk to 600 metres (2,000 ft) close to Kyūshū. By August 1942, Japan's South Manchurian Railway Company had created plans for an 8,000 km (5,000 mi) rail network, stretching from Manchukuo to Singapore. Against that backdrop, Japan took its first concrete step for a fixed link to and through Korea to connect it with its planned vast rail network in Asia, with the construction of several bridges as well as the completion of its 3.6 km (2.2 mi) Kanmon undersea railway tunnel joining the Japanese islands of Kyushu and Honshu.

Although preliminary work on rail lines, bridges, and tunnels in southern Japan was started, work on the project stopped in a few years as the nation's economy and infrastructure deteriorated because of World War II. After 1943, with increasing shortages of materials, manpower, and even transportation, Japan canceled its raumordnung (spatial plan) for its vast new Asian rail infrastructure, as it turned its full-time attention to defending its home islands from invasion. The land planning organization was discontinued in 1943, and its staff was transferred to the Japanese Home Ministry.

=== Activities since World War II ===
The proposal for a fixed link between the two countries has been raised in public discussions numerous times since the end of World War II. Leaders of both countries have called for the tunnel's construction on a number of occasions.

Since the 1980s, a Japanese research group has been engaged in detailed research and exploration of prospective routes for the tunnel. In 1988, the Japanese researchers contracted a Korean company to explore the sea of Koje to document the region's geological features.

In September 2000, South Korean President Kim Dae-jung stated that a review should be performed of the project, which could enable all of Japan to be linked to Europe as "a dream of the future." Kim's comments came during a summit meeting with Japanese Prime Minister Yoshiro Mori. The following month, Mori proposed moving ahead with the project at the Seoul summit of the Asia-Europe Meeting (ASEM), but South Korea and Japan stopped short of committing it as an official bilateral project.

By early 2002, the South Korean Ministry of Construction and Transportation had commissioned three research institutes to study the project's feasibility. Also in 2002, Japanese experts had estimated that the tunnel would take 15 years and cost US$77 billion to complete. Around that time (mid-2002), an easing of relations between North and South Korea gave impetus to the Japan–Korea tunnel project. The North and the South Korean governments had agreed on an inter-Korean rail line to run from Seoul to Pyongyang and then on to Sinuiju, a border city in the north on the Yalu River, as well as a road running parallel to the railway. From Sinuiju, trains could then cross the border and access the Trans-Chinese Railway (TCR) and then Russia's Trans-Siberian Railway (TSR), which would lead to all of Europe's rail networks.

In September 2002, a five-member Japanese delegation visited South Gyeongsang Governor Kim Hyuk-kyu of Korea's southeastern provincial government to discuss the proposal of an undersea tunnel. The legislative group from Japan was headed by Daizō Nozawa, a future Japanese Cabinet Minister of Justice who was then a Liberal Democratic Party (LDP) legislator in Japan's House of Councilors. Nozawa, who was then a key figure involved in Japanese civil engineering projects, toured Korea's Geoje region. The visit marked a starting point on the contemplated tunnel on the South Korean side, officials at the regional government stated. The same month saw comments by Alexander Losyukov, Russia's vice foreign minister for Asia-Pacific affairs, raising discussion on the tunnel project and saying that it was "something for the distant future, but feasible."

The tunnel proposal was again brought forward in the recent era by Japan's 91st prime minister, Yasuo Fukuda. At an August 2009 meeting of the International Highway Foundation in Japan, which was addressed by Huh Moon-doh of South Korea, a video was shown of a half-kilometer-long test tunnel excavated from Karatsu toward Korea. The foundation also conducted geophysical research on the seafloor in the Tsushima and Iki Islands areas. Addressing the congregation, Huh stated a serious interest in the project, which was made more attractive by the economic activity that it would generate for both countries in the midst of 2009's deepening economic recession. However, Huh interjected that "there are still deep and lingering anxieties among Korean citizens over closer connections with Japan" in reference to centuries of warfare between the nations dating back to Japan's invasions of the peninsula in the 16th century, which almost mirrored that of Britain and France. Huh also commented on the growing possibility of Chinese economic hegemony in the region, which could be blunted by greater South Korean and Japanese cooperation. "The tunnel connecting the two nations would be the very symbol of such cooperation," Huh reiterated.

In October 2009, Japanese Prime Minister Yukio Hatoyama visited Seoul and had discussions that led to two proposals, an undersea tunnel between Japan and South Korea being one of them. It was announced at the conclusion of his meetings that a research group from the two countries would convene in January 2010 to establish a tunnel-building committee. Speaking at the UN General Assembly, Hatoyama had indicated that the recent changes in Japan would help his nation be a "bridge" to the world. To build a unity of nations, Hatoyama wanted to establish an East Asian Community, similar to the European Union. An undersea tunnel between the two countries would help establish that unity.

=== Notable supporters ===
Former South Korean President Lee Myung-bak, who was inaugurated as president in February 2008, expressed a willingness to consider the project, unlike his immediate predecessor, Roh Moo-hyun. Former Japanese Defence Minister and long-term Diet member Seishiro Etō was quoted after a meeting with other interested lawmakers from various parties: "This is a dream-inspiring project" and "We'd like to promote it as a symbol of peace-building." Japanese legislators stated that the tunnel could "one day allow passengers to travel by rail from Tokyo to London."

Other South Korean presidents who have publicly supported the fixed-link include Roh Tae-woo and Kim Dae-jung. Japan's former finance minister, Masajuro Shiokawa, discussed the economic stimulus benefits of large infrastructure programs such as the Channel Tunnel in light of the grave economic crisis that his country and the region were experiencing in 2009.

Former Ministers of Justice Daizo Nozawa, the president of the Japan–Korea Tunnel Research Institute, and Kim Ki-Chun, a former executive member of the Korea-Japan Parliamentarians Union, have been significant supporters of the project: "any engineering challenges [to building the tunnel] can be met with present technology." They cautioned, however, "Far more daunting is the historic psychological barrier between the two countries. There is no better way to bring people together than to engage them in a project requiring all their efforts."

Similarly, Professor Shin Jang-cheol of Soongsil University in Korea has promoted the project by stating that "the tunnel will stimulate business, ease tension, and promote political stability in East Asia. It will also have a positive impact on the reunification of the Korean Peninsula." Shin further commented on the project's positive aspects by noting that it would encourage a joint free-trade zone by improving the region's general transportation infrastructure.

A noted longtime proponent of the tunnel project was South Korea's Sun Myung Moon, the late Korean founder who led the worldwide Unification Church. Moon proposed a "Great Asian Highway" which would start from the Asian continent and eventually become an "international highway" that connects the whole world. He made the proposal as early as November 1981 at the 10th International Conference of the Unity of the Sciences and helped establish several related committees over the next three years. Moon helped create the International Highway Construction Corporation (IHCC) in April 1982 to build the tunnel project and other transportation infrastructures and was motivated by the project's potential for promoting international harmony and world peace.

Moon was the inspiration of the late highly respected Japanese scientist Eizaburo Nishibori, who was a major proponent for the current impetus of the tunnel project. He became motivated upon hearing Reverend Moon's proposal for this tunnel in 1981 at the International Conference on the Unity of the Sciences in Seoul, South Korea. Nishibori subsequently helped to organize the Japan–Korea Tunnel Research Institute, which has performed major research and assisted in the selection of the three new proposed tunnel routes. Around 1986, Moon's organization began construction of two pilot tunnels at Tsushima and Karatsu for research purposes with engineers previously involved in the construction of the Seikan Tunnel coordinating the excavation.

In 2019, American investor and financial commentator Jim Rogers extolled the virtues of Sun Myung Moon's proposal for the tunnel, saying that it will open up Japan and Korea and bring the two countries together.

"... once it's open it brings new opportunities for travel, tourism, commerce -- for everything. A project like this… These things don't come along very often in history. We've had them before -- in England with the tunnel between Dover and France. But these things don't happen very often. This is a huge project. It will change geography and it will change history."

In October 2010, a group of 26 Korean and Japanese scholars of the Joint Research Committee for a New Korea-Japan Era, led by Ha Young-sun of Seoul National University and Masao Okonogi of Keio University, released the findings of their study: "A Joint Study Project for the New Korea-Japan Era." The research study made specific policy proposals in order to improve both countries' bilateral relations, and among the study's suggestions was a call to build the undersea tunnel to link the two countries together.

Additionally, in August 2014, business organizations representing South Korea's and Japan's largest companies announced a "need to raise public interest for the undersea tunnel plan that could link South Korea to Japan by rail" and increase tourism between both countries. Representatives of the Federation of Korean Industries and Nippon Keidanren stated that increased tourism between their two lands could "help overcome past differences and help fuel domestic spending in both countries," and the proposed undersea tunnel could create ₩54 trillion won (54T원, or US$53 billion) in economic benefits. It could provide about 45,000 jobs, according to the Busan Development Institute. While that announcement was made at a meeting held in the South Korean capital, Seoul, the Keidanren portion of the Japan Federation of Economic Organizations in Tokyo announced its support for efforts to increase "more civilian exchanges and foster better relations" between both cultures by increasing tourism and trade.

The opposition party leader Kim Chong-in expressed his support for the tunnel in February 2021.

=== Proposed routes ===
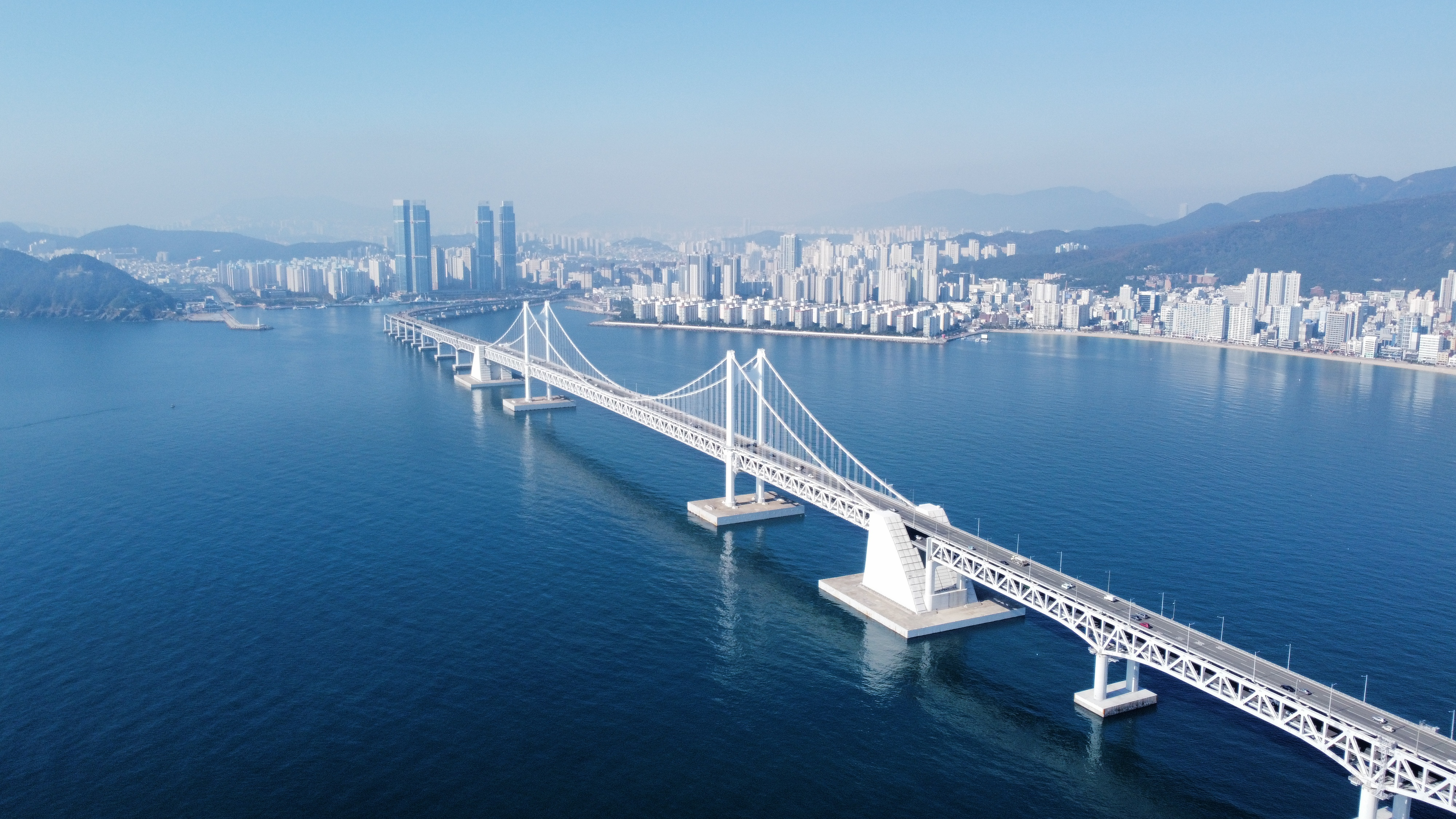
Gwangan Bridge, Busan, South Korea, the second-longest bridge in South Korea, spanning a small part of the Sea of Japan

An early proposal after World War II, the Korea-Japan Friendship Tunnel System, had tunnels running between Korea and Japan and extending from the Korean port city of Busan (connecting with Korail) to the Japanese city of Fukuoka on Kyūshū (connecting with Sanyo Shinkansen) via four islands in the Strait.

Since approximately 1988, three newer routes have been proposed for the project by the Japan–Korea Tunnel Research Institute Society (founded by the Korean Unification Church), with all three having the most eastern point terminating at Karatsu, Saga Prefecture, on the Japanese island of Kyūshū. The proposed western termination points are in the Korean port city of Busan (부산광역시) for one of the routes and the city of Geoje (거제시) for the two other routes, with all three routes running across the strait islands of Tsushima and Iki. Combined tunnel-island traverses for the three routes range from 209 to 231 km (130 to 144 mi) to cross the Korea Strait (both the eastern Tsushima Kaikyō and the western Busan Strait). Those distances would be far longer than the 50.5-kilometre (31.4 mi) undersea Channel Tunnel that connects Britain to France.

In early 2009, the joint study group stated that the route would almost certainly begin at Karatsu, in Japan's Saga Prefecture, and would likely travel to Geoje Island, on the Korean shore. If the tunnel travels between Karatsu and Geoje, it would span a length of 209 km (130 mi), with an undersea distance of 145 kilometres (90 mi), the longest such tunnel in the world.

One new proposal call for a combined road-and-rail link from Karatsu on Kyushu Island terminating at Busan, the second largest city in South Korea. Of the three tunnel routes under consideration, the favored design was a combination bridge from Karatsu to Iki Island, followed by a 60 km (37 mi) tunnel to the central portion of Tsushima. Last was a 68 km (42 mi) tunnel roughly westward to Busan, at an estimated cost of approximately 10 to 15 trillion yen ($111 billion to $157 billion).

Other options would see the final tunnel portion constructed from Tsushima to Geojedo Island, off the Korean coast, and then to Masan, on the peninsula, with two tunnel designs under consideration. One version would be similar to the Channel Tunnel, which employs a service and emergency tunnel between its two train tunnels. The other design would have a single large-diameter tunnel for both road and train traffic. Long highway tunnels have been criticized for their inherent safety issues involving serious auto accidents, as have been experienced in European tunnels. Japan uses left-hand traffic rules while Korea and China drive on the right.

== Potential benefits, costs, and possible issues ==
In the mid-1980s, the tunnel's approximate cost was estimated at US$70 billion, with the Japan–Korea Tunnel Research Institute placing it between approximately ¥10 and ¥15 trillion (Japanese yen). The proposed tunnel project would provide a savings of about 30% in costs of transporting goods between the countries.

The tunnel would benefit passenger travel, with travel times around 5 hours Seoul–Osaka (1040 km) and 7 hours Seoul–Tokyo (1550 km). That would offer South Korea a chance to redefine and expand its tourism industry to include other cities and destinations besides Seoul, as the tunnel would serve as a gateway for tourists to travel with ease to and from the peninsula. The tunnel would assist in the creation of the proposed BESETO (Beijing–Seoul–Tokyo) Highway Plan, which would connect six megacities (Shanghai, Tianjin, Beijing, Seoul, Osaka, and Tokyo), each having a population of greater than 10 million.

By 2002, a preliminary Japanese study had reported that the costs of freight transported through the tunnel would be a fourth of those related to traditional maritime shipping and that shipments from Japan to Europe, via the Eurasian Land Bridge, would arrive faster than the 20 days for seaborne transport.

Others have debated the tunnel project. The Korean news media outlet Chosunilbo reported in 2007 that construction would cost between ₩60 and ₩100 trillion and take 15 to 20 years to construct. That is more than five times the cost and three times the construction time of the tunnel between Britain and France. Opponents of the project say that Korea would gain little from such a tunnel, which would principally help Japan expand its economic and political influence into the Asian continent.

According to Professor Park Jin-hee of the Korea Maritime University, in the period before 2007, it cost $665 to ship a 6-metre (20 ft) container from Osaka to Busan. With an undersea tunnel, the estimated price would drop to $472, a saving of almost 30%. Further economic benefits would be gained if North Korea permitted trains to cross through it into China from where trains could access the Trans-Chinese Railway to the Trans-Siberian Railway to Europe. An additional proposal, raised in 2009, suggested the construction of a second tunnel from Pyeongtaek, at the north end of South Korea, tunneling westward to Weihai in China's Shandong Province and completely bypassing North Korea, whose government has been seen as volatile and temperamental. Such a Yellow Sea tunnel would cover a distance of 370 km (230 mi).

However, negative views of the tunnel's profitability emerged the same year. Japanese Studies Professor Shin Jang-cheol, of Seoul's Soongsil University, stated that the countries' political proposals were "nothing but [empty] diplomatic rhetoric." Key issues for the tunnel would be its enormous construction cost combined with possible low profitability, similar to the Eurotunnel's financial situation since it opened in 1994.

In early 2009, the new joint study group identified that the construction costs alone would be ¥10 trillion by a Japanese estimate and almost ₩200 trillion by a Korean estimate. A Japanese report showed the tunnel would not be economically feasible, with similar results to another study, which was conducted by the Koreans.

However, the group pointed out that the tunnel is economically feasible if decision-makers included the effects of job creation and the project's ability to revive the construction industry. Korea would see a ₩13 trillion addition to its construction industry, and Japan's increase would be ₩18 trillion. With industrial effects, the group forecast that Korea would see economic benefits worth ₩54 trillion and ₩88 trillion for Japan.

In 2011, a new study, released by South Korea's Land, Transport and Maritime Affairs Ministry, referring to studies by the government's Korea Transport Institute (KOTI), reported that the proposed tunnel project, as well as another proposed tunnel project from the northwest of South Korea to neighboring China, which would bypass North Korea, was economically non-feasible. The KOTI studies cited the estimated combined construction costs for both projects at about ₩100 trillion (US$90 billion), which would produce an extremely low benefit-to-cost result.

In 2014, the South Korean Busan Development Institute estimated the undersea tunnel could create 54 trillion won (US$53 billion) in economic benefits and provide about 45,000 jobs.

== Comparison to Anglo-French Channel Tunnel ==
In an April 2009 editorial, former Justice Ministers Daizō Nozawa of Japan and Kim Ki Chun of South Korea remarked on some of the similarities of the proposed Japan–Korea tunnel to the Anglo-French tunnel. The Channel Tunnel runs for 50.4 km (31.3 mi) linking the United Kingdom and France, and opened in May 1994: At 37.9 km (23.5 mi), the tunnel has the longest undersea portion of any tunnel in the world. The Japan–Korea tunnel faces technical issues and similarly the mistrust of two former adversaries created by centuries of conflict. However, the UK and France were able to overlook their historical divide and link themselves, which set the stage for a major change in their relationship.

The addition of the fixed link to Europe once believed to be "impossible to build and financially impractical", resulted in numerous positive changes to both the United Kingdom and Continental Europe. Among the most significant was the loss of a key psychological barrier (akin to an "island mentality") that had held back many Britons and other Europeans from traveling to each other's nations, according to Kim and Nozawa.

A veritable new industry subsequently sprang up to serve Britons wanting to buy properties in European countries. Fifteen years after opening the Channel Tunnel, it was estimated that 300,000 French citizens were living in London, helped in part by reasonably priced Eurostar fares and service that is almost completely immune to bad weather and heavy seas. The Channel Tunnel is seen as an important asset to the entire European Union's infrastructure, placing Brussels less than two hours from central London, with central Paris taking only 15 minutes longer to reach. It has "greatly facilitated the integration of the region." The Japan-Korea Cooperation Committee, composed of business organizations and academics, similarly concluded in August 2009 that "the undersea tunnel may contribute to the integration process of Northeast Asia."

That fixed link allows hundreds of thousands of citizens to move and work more freely in each other's countries and has allowed for greater economic growth. In contrast, northeast Asia, also one of the world's fastest-growing economies, experiences a lower degree of internal political cohesion partly due to its poorer intraregional transportation links. This observation was similarly noted after a two-day meeting in late 2008 by the Japan–Korea Cooperation Committee of business leaders and academics that reported "the undersea tunnel may contribute to the integration process of Northeast Asia", helping to establish an Asian economic sphere of several hundred million-plus people.

Politically and economically, both tunnels could be viewed as symbols of regional integration, with former French President François Mitterrand once stating: "The Channel Tunnel... is nothing less than a revolution...."

Nozawa and Kim further claimed that the Channel Tunnel was instrumental in redirecting how the peoples of different cultures and nationalities viewed each other, something they hoped that the Japan–Korea fixed link would accomplish to reverse centuries of conflict and mistrust between their countries. As with the Channel Tunnel, the Japan–Korea tunnel would be regarded as a prime political symbol and proof of intraregional cooperation.

For the Japan–Korea fixed link project to proceed, it must, after decades of informal talks and private research, similarly move into formal bilateral discussions and agreements.

== Associated difficulties ==
=== Societal ===
The public in Japan and South Korea have reservations toward closer links with each other. Some South Koreans have strong memories of the Japanese occupation of Korea from 1910 to 1945. Urban Planning Professor Hur Jae-wan of Seoul's Chung-Ang University argued that for the tunnel to become politically viable it would be essential for the project to gain significant support from both countries' citizenry:

The Japanese hold a xenophobic nationalism that they are different from other Asian countries. The South Koreans, in contrast, believe they were victimized by the Japanese and harbor suspicion about Japan's expansionism and think the tunnel might lead the South Korean economy and culture to be absorbed into Japan's.

In the mid-2000s, disputes over history, territory, and policies aimed at North Korea had brought both countries' relations to a low point and deepened their mistrust of each other. Professor Shin Jang-churl of Soongsil University in Seoul advised that it was essential for consensus to be reached by nationals of both Japan and South Korea on the relevant issues that divided them.

=== Political ===
Japan and South Korea tend to favor large infrastructure projects, so the project might seem to be advantageous politically, but it has been the target of far-right and nationalist political groups in both countries. Many South Koreans have advised caution in proceeding with the project because of worries of firms in the much larger Japanese economy becoming more dominant in South Korea from the lower logistical expenses that the tunnel would provide. The increased economic power would further expand Japanese political power in the region. Similarly, many Japanese firms worry that the tunnel may expand the increasing dominance of South Korean firms in sectors such as consumer electronics. China's increasing dominance in the region may eventually minimize those concerns and make the project politically viable, but that has not yet been the case.

In the early 2000s, Japan's relationship with South Korea worsened when Japanese Prime Minister Junichiro Koizumi visited his country's Yasukuni Shrine several times, an action that was deemed offensive to many Koreans. Another contentious issue may be the territorial dispute over the Liancourt Rocks islets (Dokdo/Takeshima) to the northeast of the strait, which have long been claimed by both parties but are under South Korean control since 1952 in what the Japanese government regards as an illegal occupation. Japan has at least three times proposed the dispute be referred to the International Court of Justice, but Korea has rejected those proposals.

Aside from the power politics that exist between Tokyo, Seoul, Pyongyang, and Beijing, other policy issues that could restrict a tunnel between Japan and Korea include regulatory barriers such as different rail transport regulations, border controls, and trade policies.

After the assassination of former prime minister Shinzo Abe on 8 July 2022, the Unification Church, which was a strong proponent of the tunnel, became the headline of Japanese news for more than a month, because the suspected gunman accused the church of bankrupting his mother and ruining his entire family, as well as the strong ties of the church with Shinzo Abe, which in turn helped spread the church's influence in Japan. Not only Abe and his ancestors but over a hundred lawmakers of Abe's Liberal Democratic Party were also exposed of having ties with the church to various degrees. The scandal was so severe that Prime Minister Fumio Kishida reshuffled his cabinet on 10 August 2022 in an attempt to cope with a sharp decline of his approval rating after the assassination. Japanese media also revealed a publication by the former director of the Japan branch of the church, Gentaro Kajikuri, in which he mentioned that the 10 billion yen for constructing the pilot tunnels at Tsushima and Karatsu were entirely funded by the donations of their Japanese believers, further fueling the public opposition against the church and the tunnel in Japan.

=== Segments ===
The minimum distances (including islands linked by a bridge or an existing tunnel) (Google Earth Maps as source)

- Busan/Taejongdae Park to North Tsushima 49.2 km (30.6 mi) across the relatively deep Tsushima Trough (maximum 200 m (656 ft) deep)
- Geoje to North Tsushima 55.5 km (34.5 mi) across the relatively deep Tsushima Trough (maximum 190 m (623 ft) deep)
- Cutting through the scenic, rugged, and heavily forested Tsushima from the Busan landing site, 58 km (36 mi) (subtotal 107.2 km (66.6 mi))
- Cutting through the scenic, rugged, and heavily forested Tsushima from the Geoje landing site, 52.4 km (32.6 mi) (subtotal 107.9 km (67.0 mi))
- Southern Tsushima to Iki Island (maximum 125 m (410 ft) deep, 47.2 km (29.3 mi))
- Across Iki Island (similarly scenic, less rugged, and more mixed with valleys, hills, and forest) 15 km (9.3 mi)
- From Iki Island to Kyushu's closest headland offshore island (15.5 km (9.6 mi), maximum 55 m (180 ft) deep)
- From there to railhead across Karatsu Bay, some 24 km (15 mi), or alternatively but more circuitous, Nishi-Karatsu Station, 19.5 km (12.1 mi), heading towards major cities such as Fukuoka. Bridges or tunnels would be required over relatively shallow waters.
- Any shipping ports in those areas to interconnect with systems.

It is possible that parts, especially less complicated portions of the whole project, may be completed in isolation without the entire project being realized, which would reduce the need for longer sea travel for passengers or cargo.

=== Competing projects ===
- A joint China-Russia project to connect Hunchun, already connected to the high-speed rail network, with Zarubino port in Primorski Krai, Russia, would allow Chinese imports and exports to find an alternative all-season port that shaves a seaborne 1,000 km (620 mi) on a trans-Pacific route. Rason, North Korea, is similarly only 60 km (37 mi) away from Hunchun.

== See also ==
- Jeju Undersea Tunnel
- KTX
- Sakhalin–Hokkaido Tunnel, a proposed Russia–Japan undersea tunnel and possible competitor to the Japan–Korea tunnel project
- Palk Strait Bridge
- Helsinki–Tallinn Tunnel
- Trans-Asian Railway
- Trans Global Highway/Japan–Korea Tunnel
- Transloading
- Tunnel boring machine
