= Greater East Asia Railroad =

Proposal in 1941 to build a railroad linking Japan and mainland Asia

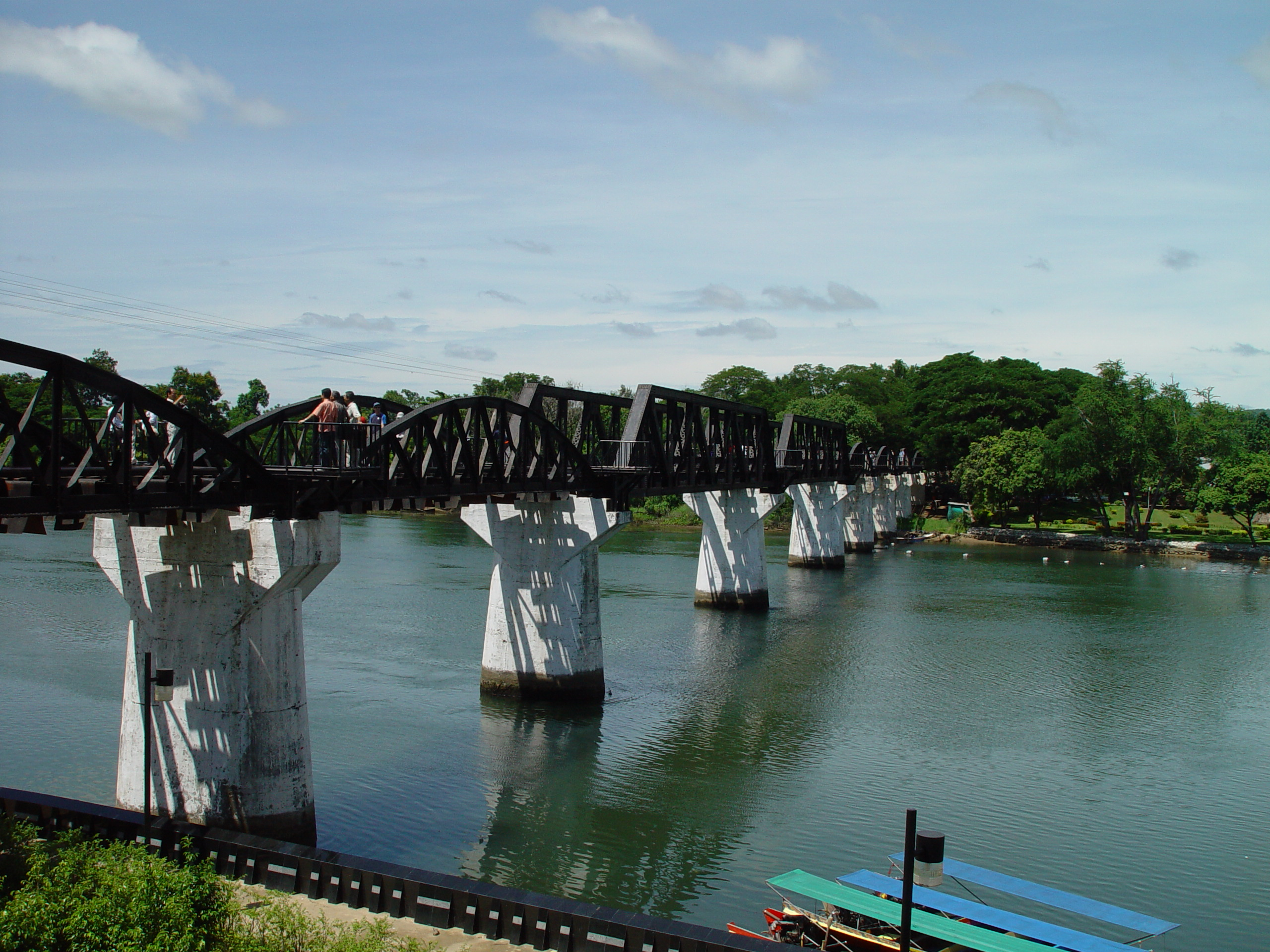
Burma Railway, one of the lines constructed as a part of this idea

Greater East Asia Railroad (大東亜縦貫鉄道, Daitōa Jūkan Tetsudō) was an idea for a railroad linking Japan with mainland Asia and Europe, formulated around 1941 during the Second Sino-Japanese War leading to World War II. Part of the plan included a tunnel or bridge somewhat similar to the more recent Japan–Korea Undersea Tunnel proposal.

== Description ==
The idea of a unified railway operation in Greater East Asia Co-Prosperity Sphere is said to have come from the South Manchuria Railway around 1941. On August 21, 1942, the idea was proposed to the Japanese government along with ideas of bullet trains, which also included the construction of an undersea tunnel connecting Japan and Korea, similar to the more recent Japan–Korea Undersea Tunnel proposal. It is unknown how serious and realistic the government took the plan as, but the plan was later openly spread as a part of a propaganda. While the government insisted the percentage of the route needing additional construction was small, those already built lines had varying track gauge, which forced changing trains several times in areas. The government also argued that changing trains several times in such a large route shouldn't be taken as a large problem. At the time the idea first originated, some of the sections were not under Japanese occupation as well.

== Studied routes ==
A report published in 1942 titled 大東亜縦貫鉄道に就て (About the Greater East Asia Through Railway) presents the following routes as proposals:

- Daiichi through rail corridor (第1縦貫鉄道群), Connecting Tokyo and Syonan-to
1. Tokyo – Shimonoseki – Pusan – Fengtian (present day Shenyang) – Tianjin – Beijing – Hankou – Hengyang – Guilin – Liuzhou – Nanning – Trấn Nam Quan – Xóm Cục – Thakhek – Kumphawapi – Bangkok – Padang Besar – Syonan-to (present day Singapore)
2. A separate line to 1. that splits from Tianjin for Nanjing
3. Sea route linking Nagasaki to Shanghai that merges to 1.
- Daini through rail corridor (第2縦貫鉄道群), Branch line of Daiichi through railway
1. Bangkok – Ban Pong – Thanbyuzayat – Rangoon (present day Yangon) – Kyangin – Chittagong (Partially completed as the military use Thai-Burma Railway)
2. Changsha – Changde – Kunming – Lashio – Mandalay – Chittagong
- Daisan through rail corridor (第3縦貫鉄道群), Connection between Japan and its ally Germany
1. Tokyo – Shimonoseki – Pusan – Fengtian – Harbin – Manzhouli – Irkutsk – Moscow – Berlin (utilizes the Siberian Railway)
2. Tokyo – (Kobe or Moji) – Tianjin – Zhangjiakou – Baotou – Suzhou – Anxi – Hami – Kashgar – Kabul – Baghdad – Istanbul – Berlin (Trans-Central Asia Railway Project)
3. Tokyo – (Nagasaki) – Shanghai – Kunming – Rangoon – Calcutta (present day Kolkata) – Peshawar – Kabul – Baghdad – Istanbul – Berlin

== See also ==
- South Manchuria Railway
- Trans-Asian Railway
- Greater East Asia Co-Prosperity Sphere
