= Armies of the Imperial Japanese Army =

Army (軍, gun) was a term in the Imperial Japanese Army used in different ways to designate a variety of large military formations that corresponded to the army group, field army, and corps in the militaries of Western nations.

== General Armies ==
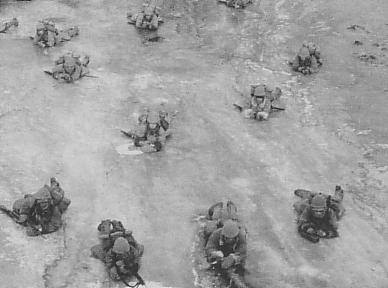
Kwantung Army on maneuvers

The General Army (総軍, Sō-gun) was the highest level in the organizational structure of the Imperial Japanese Army. It corresponded to the army group in western military terminology. Intended to be self-sufficient for indefinite periods, the general armies were commanded by either a field marshal or a full general.

The initial General Army was the Japanese Manchurian Army, formed from 1904 to 1905 during the Russo-Japanese War as a temporary command structure to coordinate the efforts of several Japanese armies in the campaign against Imperial Russia.

In terms of a permanent standing organization, the Japanese Army created the Kantōgun, usually known in English as the Kwantung Army, to manage its overseas deployment in the Kwantung Territory and Manchukuo from 1906.

Subsequent general armies were created in response to the needs of the Second Sino-Japanese War and World War II, in which increased overseas deployment called for an organizational structure that could respond quickly and autonomously from the Imperial Japanese Army General Staff in Tokyo. As a result, Japanese forces were re-organized into three separate overseas operational commands: (Manchuria, China and Southeast Asia), with the Japanese home islands forming a fourth.

Towards the end of World War II, the home island command (i.e. the General Defense Command) was restructured geographically into the First General Army in the east, Second General Army in the west, and the Air General Army in charge of military aviation.

With the official Japanese surrender in September 1945, all of the general armies were dissolved, except for the First General Army, which continued to exist until November 30, 1945, as the 1st Demobilization Headquarters.

Name	Active	Operational Area
Kwantung Army (関東軍, Kantōgun)	1906–1945	Manchukuo
China Expeditionary Army (支那派遣軍, Shina hakengun)	1939–1945	China
Central China Expeditionary Army (中支那派遣軍, Nakashina hakengun)	1938–1939	China
Southern Expeditionary Army Group (南方軍, Nampōgun)	1941–1945	Southeast Asia, Southwest Pacific
General Defense Command (防衛総司令部, Bōei Sōshireibu)	1941–1945	Japanese home islands
First General Army (第1総軍, Dai-ichi Sōgun)	1945	Eastern and northern Honshū (including Tokyo)
Second General Army (第2総軍, Dai-ni Sōgun)	1945	Kyūshū, western Honshū and Shikoku
Air General Army (航空総軍, Kōkū Sōgun)	1945	Army aviation units across the home islands

== Area Armies ==
Area Armies (方面軍, Hōmen-gun) in Japanese military terminology were equivalent to field armies in western militaries. Area Armies were normally commanded by a general or lieutenant general. There is much confusion between the similarly numbered Area Armies and Armies in historical records, as many writers often did not make a clear distinction when describing the units involved.

Name	Active	Main areas of operations
First Area Army (第1方面軍, Dai ichi hōmen gun)	1942–1945	Manchukuo
Second Area Army (第2方面軍, Dai ni hōmen gun)	1942–1945	Manchukuo
Third Area Army (第3方面軍, Dai san hōmen gun)	1943–1945	Manchukuo
Fifth Area Army (第5方面軍, Dai go hōmen gun)	1944–1945	Japanese home islands
Sixth Area Army (第6方面軍, Dai roku hōmen gun)	1944–1945	China
Seventh Area Army (第7方面軍, Dai nana hōmen gun)	1944–1945	Indonesia, Malaya, Singapore
Eighth Area Army (第8方面軍, Dai hachi hōmen gun)	1942–1945	Solomon Islands, New Guinea
Tenth Area Army (第10方面軍, Dai jyū hōmen gun)	1944–1945	Taiwan
Eleventh Area Army (第11方面軍, Dai jyū ichi hōmen gun)	1945-1945	Japanese home islands
Twelfth Area Army (第12方面軍, Dai jyū ni hōmen gun)	1945-1945	Japanese home islands
Thirteenth Area Army (第13方面軍, Dai jyū san hōmen gun)	1945-1945	Japanese home islands
Fourteenth Area Army (第14方面軍, Dai jyū yon hōmen gun)	1942–1945	Philippines
Fifteenth Area Army (第15方面軍, Dai jyū go hōmen gun)	1945-1945	Japanese home islands
Sixteenth Area Army (第16方面軍, Dai jyū roku hōmen gun)	1945-1945	Japanese home islands
Seventeenth Area Army (第17方面軍, Dai jyū nana hōmen gun)	1945-1945	Korea
Eighteenth Area Army (第18方面軍, Dai jyū hachi hōmen gun)	1943–1945	Thailand
Burma Area Army (緬甸方面軍, Biruma hōmen gun)	1943–1945	Burma
Central China Area Army (中支那方面軍, Naka-Shina hōmen gun)	1937–1938	China
Northern China Area Army (北支那方面軍, Kita-Shina hōmen gun)	1937–1945	China
Southern China Area Army (南支那方面軍, Minami-Shina hōmen gun)	1940–1941	China
Northern District Army (北部軍, Hokubu gun)	1940–1945	Japanese home islands
Eastern District Army (東部軍, Tobu gun)	1923–1945	Japanese home islands
Western District Army (西部軍, Seibu gun)	1937–1945	Japanese home islands
Central District Army (中部軍, Chubu gun)	1945-1945	Japanese home islands
Shanghai Expeditionary Army (上海派遣軍, Shanhai Haken gun)	1932, 1937–1938	China

== Armies ==
The Japanese Army (軍, gun) corresponded to an army corps in American or British military terminology. It was usually commanded by a lieutenant general.

  - First Army – China
  - Second Army – China
  - Third Army – Manchukuo
  - Fourth Army – Manchukuo
  - Fifth Army – Manchukuo
  - Sixth Army – Manchukuo
  - Tenth Army – China
  - Eleventh Army – China
  - Twelfth Army – China
  - Thirteenth Army – China
  - Fourteenth Army – Philippines
  - Fifteenth Army – Burma
  - Sixteenth Army – Java
  - Seventeenth Army – Solomon Islands
  - Eighteenth Army – New Guinea
  - Nineteenth Army – eastern Netherlands East Indies
  - Twentieth Army – China
  - Twenty-First Army – China
  - Twenty-Second Army – China
  - Twenty-Third Army – China
  - Twenty-Fifth Army – Malaya, Singapore, Sumatra
  - Twenty-Seventh Army – Chishima Islands
  - Twenty-Eighth Army – Burma
  - Twenty-Ninth Army – British Malaya
  - Thirtieth Army – Manchukuo
  - Thirty-First Army – Truk
  - Thirty-Second Army – Okinawa
  - Thirty-Third Army – Burma
  - Thirty-Fourth Army – Manchukuo
  - Thirty-Fifth Army – Philippines
  - Thirty-Sixth Army – Japanese home islands
  - Thirty-Seventh Army – Borneo
  - Thirty-Eighth Army -Indochina
  - Thirty-Ninth Army -Thailand
  - Fortieth Army – Japanese home islands
  - Forty-First Army – Philippines
  - Forty-Third Army – China
  - Forty-Fourth Army – Manchukuo
  - Fiftieth Army – Japanese home islands
  - Fifty-First Army – Japanese home islands
  - Fifty-Second Army – Japanese home islands
  - Fifty-Third Army – Japanese home islands
  - Fifty-Fourth Army – Japanese home islands
  - Fifty-Fifth Army – Japanese home islands
  - Fifty-Sixth Army – Japanese home islands
  - Fifty-Seventh Army – Japanese home islands
  - Fifty-Eighth Army – Korea
  - Fifty-Ninth Army – Japanese home islands
  - China Garrison Army – China
  - Mongolia Garrison Army- Inner Mongolia
  - Army of Tokyo Bay
  - Tokyo defense Army
- Imperial Japanese Army Air Force
  - First Air Army – HQ Tokyo, basing in the Kanto Plain covering the Japanese home islands, Taiwan, Korea and Karafuto.
  - Second Air Army – HQ Xinjing, covering Manchukuo
  - Third Air Army – HQ Singapore, covering Southeast Asia
  - Fourth Air Army – HQ Rabaul, covering the Solomon Islands and New Guinea
  - Fifth Air Army – HQ Nanjing, covering Japanese-occupied portions of southern and eastern China.
  - Sixth Air Army – HQ Kyūshū covering Taiwan and Okinawa

=== Auxiliaries ===
- Peacebuilding National Army
- Manchukuo Imperial Army
- Mengjiang National Army
- Indian National Army
- Burmese National Army
- Kempeitai
- Japanese Korean Army
