= List of graduates of the Japanese Imperial Military Academies =

List (1891-1934)

This is a select list of graduates from the Japanese Imperial Military Academies (1891–1934). It is not complete.

== Graduates from the Imperial Japanese Army Academy (Military Academy) ==
=== 1891 Class ===
- Kazushige Ugaki: 1891

=== 1897 Class ===
- Sadao Araki: November
- Jinsaburo Mazaki: November

=== 1904 Class ===
- Tetsuzan Nagata: October

=== 1905 Class ===
- Michitarō Komatsubara

=== 1906 Class ===
- Hiroshi Ōshima

=== 1908 Class ===
- Naruhiko Higashikuni

=== 1912 Class ===
- Torashirō Kawabe: May

=== 1915 Class ===
- Kitsuju Ayabe: May

=== 1921 Class ===
- Akira Mutō: assigned to Military Academy, April

=== 1922 Class ===
- Takushiro Hattori: July

=== 1923 class ===
- Hiromichi Yahara

== Graduates from the Japanese Army War College ==
The following were notable graduates of the Army War College:

=== 1903 Class ===
- Hisaichi Terauchi: December

=== 1909 Class ===
- Otozō Yamada: December

=== 1910 Class ===
- Toshizō Nishio: graduated from War College, assigned to Military Affairs Bureau, November
- Koiso Kuniaki: November
- Gen Sugiyama: November
- Shunroku Hata: graduated with top scholarly rank, November

=== 1911 Class ===
- Yoshijirō Umezu: November
- Tetsuzan Nagata: November

=== 1912 Class ===
- Kenji Doihara: November

=== 1913 Class ===
- Yasuji Okamura: November

=== 1914 Class ===
- Rikichi Andō: December
- Keisuke Fujie: November
- Naruhiko Higashikuni

=== 1915 Class ===
- Hiroshi Ōshima
- Hideki Tōjō: December
- Masaharu Homma: December
- Shōjirō Iida: December
- Hitoshi Imamura: December
- Masakazu Kawabe

=== 1916 Class ===
- Seishirō Itagaki: November
- Tomoyuki Yamashita: November
- Shizuichi Tanaka
- Shigenori Kuroda: November
- Heitarō Kimura: November

=== 1917 Class ===
- Renya Mutaguchi: November
- Jun Ushiroku: November
- Teiichi Suzuki: November
- Kenryo Sato (Chief, Military Affairs Section, War Ministry; Chief, Military Affairs Bureau, same Ministry)
- Seizo Arisue (Chief, Second Bureau-Intelligence, Army General Staff)
- Tan Nukata (Chief, Third Bureau—Logistics, Army General Staff; Chief, General Affairs Bureau, do; Chief, Personnel Bureau, War Ministry)
- Goro Isoya (Chief, Third Bureau-Logistics, Army General Staff)

=== 1918 Class ===
- Korechika Anami: November
- Kiichiro Higuchi: November
- Kanji Ishiwara: November

=== 1919 Class ===
- Hideyoshi Obata: December
- Sōsaku Suzuki: November

=== 1920 Class ===
- Hidemitsu Nakano: November
- Kingoro Hashimoto
- Akira Mutō

=== 1921 Class ===
- Torashirō Kawabe: November
- Harukichi Hyakutake: December

=== 1922 Class ===
- Kiyotake Kawaguchi: November
- Hatazō Adachi: November
- Takushiro Hattori (Chief, Second Section operations, Army General Staff)
- Susumu Nishiura (Chief, Army Affairs Section, War Ministry)
- Akiho Ishii (Chief, Military Affairs Section, War Ministry)

=== 1923 Class ===
- Tadamichi Kuribayashi: November
- Hong Sa-ik
- Okikatsu Arao (Koko) (Chief, Shipping Section, Army General Staff; senior Staff Officer, Army Affairs Section, War Ministry; Chief, Third Section—Organization and Mobilization, Army General Staff)
- Hiroo Sato (Chief, War Materiel Section, War Ministry; and an officer who, like Col Arao, had the confidence of War Minister Anami)
- Yozo Miyama (Chief, Third Section-Organization and Mobilization, Army General Staffs post which he held before the author assumed it; and Senior Adjutant, War Ministry)
- Makoto Matsutani (Chief, 20th Group-War Coordination, Army General Staff; Military Secretary to Prime Minister Suzuki)

=== 1925 Class ===
- Shizuo Yokoyama: November

=== 1927 Class ===
- Takeshi Mori: December

=== 1929 ===
- Hiromichi Yahara: returned as an instructor 1937-1940

=== 1930 Class ===
- Takushiro Hattori: November
- Masutaro Nakai: December

=== 1931 Class ===
- Masanobu Tsuji

=== 1937 Class ===
- José Laurel III

=== 1944 Class ===
- Takagi Masao (3rd President of South Korea, also known as Park Chung-hee)

== Graduates in Military Overseas Studies ==
- Shunroku Hata: Military Student, Germany, March 1912
- Hisaichi Terauchi: Military Student, Germany, February 1913
- Yoshijirō Umezu: Military Student, Germany, April 1913
- Masaharu Homma: Military Student, England, August 1918 (and served as observer with British forces in France)
- Hitoshi Imamura: Military Student, England, April 1918; Assistant Military Attaché, England, October 1918
- Naruhiko Higashikuni: Resident Officer, France, studying military tactics, April 1920
- Tomoyuki Yamashita: Military Student. Germany, July 1921
- Hideyoshi Obata: Military Student, England, April 1923; Major, March 1926
- Minoru Sasaki: Military Student, U.S.S.R., September 1927; same for Poland and U.S.S.R., August 1928
- Torashirō Kawabe: Resident Officer, Riga, Latvia (studying Soviet military affairs), January 1926-September 1928

== Students in Army Cavalry School ==
- Kitsuju Ayabe: Equitation Student, October 1917

== Graduates from Artillery and Engineering School ==
- Takeo Yasuda: July 1916

== Graduates from the Imperial Japanese Naval Academy ==
- Kantarō Suzuki: 1887
- Mitsumasa Yonai: 1901
- Shigetarō Shimada: November 1904

== Graduates from the Naval War College ==
- Kantarō Suzuki: 1898
- Shigetarō Shimada: Class "A" Student, December 1913
- Mitsumasa Yonai: 1913
