= Sixteenth Area Army =

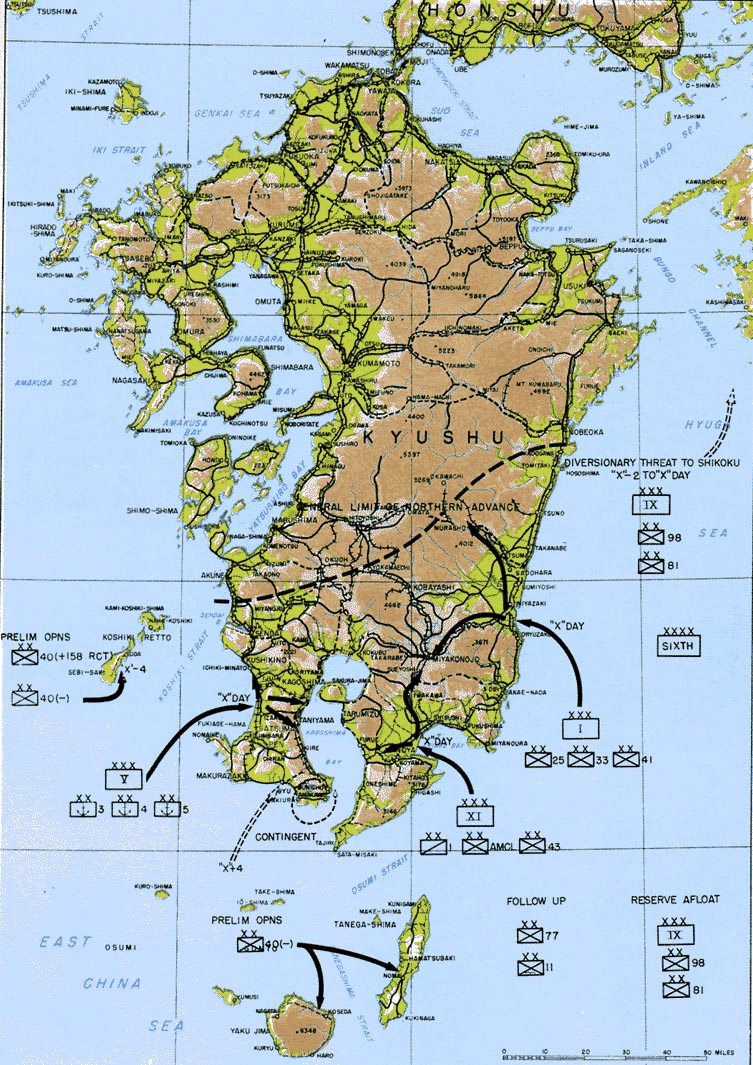
- Invasion Map for Operation Downfall
- Active: February 1, 1945 - August 15, 1945
- Country: Empire of Japan
- Branch: Imperial Japanese Army
- Type: Infantry
- Role: Field Army
- Garrison/HQ: Chikushino city, Fukuoka Prefecture
- Nickname: 睦 (Boku = “harmonious”)
- Engagements: Operation Downfall

The Sixteenth Area Army (第16方面軍, Dai jyūroku hōmen gun) was a field army of the Imperial Japanese Army during the closing stages of World War II.

== History ==
The Japanese 16th Area Army was formed on February 1, 1945, under the General Defense Command as part of the last desperate defense effort by the Empire of Japan to deter possible landings of Allied forces in Kyūshū during Operation Downfall (or Operation Ketsugō (決号作戦, Ketsugō sakusen) in Japanese terminology). It was transferred to the newly formed Japanese Second General Army on April 8, 1945. The Japanese 16th Area Army was headquartered in what is now part of Chikushino city, Fukuoka Prefecture. The 16th Area Army leadership also held equivalent posts in the Western District Army, and had the honor of receiving their appointments personally from Emperor Hirohito rather than the Imperial General Headquarters. By the time of the Japanese surrender, the 16th Area Army had 916,828 personnel on Kyushu either in position or in various stages of deployment.

Although the Japanese were able to raise large numbers of new soldiers, equipping them was more difficult. By August, the Japanese Army had the equivalent of 65 divisions in the homeland but only enough equipment for 40 and only enough ammunition for 30. The Japanese did not formally decide to stake everything on the outcome of the Battle of Kyūshū, but they concentrated their assets to such a degree that there would be little left in reserve. By one estimate, the forces in Kyūshū had 40% of all the ammunition in the Home Islands.

In addition, the Japanese had organized the Patriotic Citizens Fighting Corps — which included all healthy men aged 15–60 and women 17–40 — to perform combat support, and ultimately combat jobs. Weapons, training, and uniforms were generally lacking: some men were armed with nothing better than muzzle-loading muskets, longbows, or bamboo spears; nevertheless, they were expected to make do with what they had.

One mobilized high school girl, Yukiko Kasai, found herself issued an awl and told, "Even killing one American soldier will do. … You must aim for the abdomen."

The 16th Area Army was demobilized at the surrender of Japan on August 15, 1945, without having seen combat.

== List of Commanders ==
=== Commanding officer ===
	Name	From	To
1	Lieutenant General Isamu Yokoyama	1 February 1945	15 August 1945

=== Chief of Staff ===
	Name	From	To
1	Lieutenant General Wataro Yoshinaka	1 February 1945	3 May 1945
2	Lieutenant General Masazumi Inada	3 May 1945	15 August 1945
