= Mongolia Garrison Army =

Japanese Mongolia Garrison Army
- Active: December 27, 1937 - July 27, 1946
- Country: Empire of Japan
- Branch: Imperial Japanese Army
- Type: Infantry
- Role: Corps
- Garrison/HQ: Kalgan
- Nickname(s): Bō (戊)
- Engagements: Soviet invasion of Manchuria

The Mongolia Garrison Army (駐蒙軍, Chūmōgun) was an army of the Imperial Japanese Army during World War II.

== History ==
The Japanese Mongolia Garrison Army was raised on December 27, 1937, as a garrison force in Japanese-dominated Inner Mongolia and adjacent areas of north China. From July 4, 1938, the Mongolia Garrison Army came under the administrative jurisdiction of the North China Area Army. In January 1939 the Cavalry Group was added, consisting of the 1st Cavalry Brigade and 4th Cavalry Brigade. In December 1942, the 4th Cavalry Brigade was sent to the Twelfth Army and the remainder of the Cavalry Group was converted into the 3rd Tank Division.

During most of the Second Sino-Japanese War and due to the Soviet–Japanese Neutrality Pact, Inner Mongolia was largely a backwater region, and the Mongolia Garrison Army, with its antiquated horse cavalry functioned largely to assist and train the Mengjiang National Army and Mongolian Cavalry Corps. It was thus unprepared for the massive Soviet Red Army armored assault at the end of World War II. The Mongolia Garrison Army was officially disbanded on July 27, 1946. Many of its survivors became Japanese prisoners of war in the Soviet Union.

== List of commanders ==
=== Commanding Officer ===
	Name	From	To
1	General Shigeru Hasunuma	28 December 1937	31 August 1939
2	Field Marshal Hajime Sugiyama	31 August 1939	12 September 1939
3	General Naosaburo Okabe	12 September 1939	29 September 1940
4	General Masataka Yamawaki	29 September 1940	20 January 1941
5	General Shigetaro Amakasu	20 January 1941	2 March 1942
6	Lieutenant General Ichiro Shichida	2 March 1942	28 May 1943
7	Lieutenant General Yoshio Kozuki	28 May 1943	22 November 1944
8	Lieutenant General Hiroshi Nemoto	22 November 1944	19 August 1945

=== Chief of Staff ===
	Name	From	To
1	Colonel Tora Ishimoto	28 December 1937	13 January 1939
2	General Shinichi Tanaka	12 February 1939	1 August 1940
3	Lieutenant General Shigeru Takahashi	1 August 1940	21 October 1941
4	Lieutenant General Toyojiro Inamura	21 October 1941	1 December 1942
5	Lieutenant General Masao Yano	1 December 1942	26 October 1944
6	Major General Ryozu Nakagawa	26 October 1944	19 August 1945

== See also ==
- List of Armies of the Japanese Army
