= Kōtarō Nakamura =

Imperial Japanese Army general (1881–1947)

- 中村 孝太郎
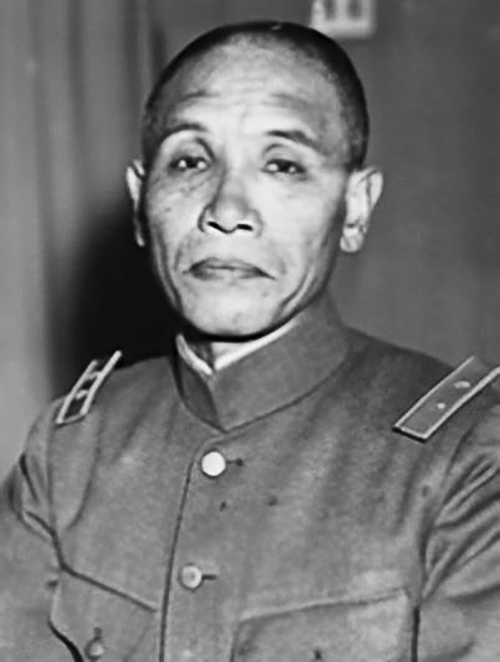

Minister of the Army
- In office 2 February 1937 – 9 February 1937
- Prime Minister: Senjūrō Hayashi
- Preceded by: Hisaichi Terauchi
- Succeeded by: Hajime Sugiyama

Member of the Supreme War Council
- In office 7 July 1941 – 24 December 1941
- Monarch: Hirohito
- In office 1 March 1937 – 15 July 1938
- Monarch: Hirohito

Personal details
- Born: 28 August 1881 Ishikawa, Japan
- Died: 29 August 1947 (aged 66)
- Education: Imperial Japanese Army Academy; Army Staff College

Military service
- Allegiance: Empire of Japan
- Branch/service: Imperial Japanese Army
- Years of service: 1901–1943
- Rank: General
- Unit: Imperial Japanese Army General Staff; Inspector-General of Military Training
- Commands: IJA 67th Infantry Regiment; IJA 39th Infantry Brigade; China Garrison Army; Eastern District Army; Japanese Korean Army

Kōtarō Nakamura (中村 孝太郎, Nakamura Kōtarō; 28 August 1881 – 29 August 1947) was a general in the Imperial Japanese Army and very briefly Army Minister in the 1930s.

== Biography ==
Nakamura was a native of Ishikawa Prefecture. He was educated in military preparatory schools from early youth, and graduated from the 13th class of the Imperial Japanese Army Academy in 1901, and from the 21st class of the Army Staff College in 1909, where his classmates included Hisaichi Terauchi and Yoshijirō Umezu.

Nakamura served in various administrative and staff positions within the Imperial Japanese Army General Staff for almost his entire career. He was sent as a military attaché to Sweden from 1920 to 1921.

After his promotion to lieutenant colonel, Nakamura was assigned command of the IJA 67th Infantry Regiment from 1922 to 1923. He returned to the General Staff from 1923 to 1927. In 1927, Nakamura was promoted to major general and commanded the IJA 39th Infantry Brigade. From 1929 to 1930, he was the Chief of Staff of the Chosen Army in Korea.

Nakamura served as Chief of the Personnel Bureau in the General Staff from 1930 to 1932. He returned to the field as the commander of the Japanese China Garrison Army in 1932, and was shortly thereafter promoted to lieutenant general. In 1934, Nakamura became commander of the 8th Army. He was recalled to Tokyo in December 1935 to serve as Deputy Inspector-General of Military Training.

From 2 to 7 February 1937, Nakamura became Army Minister for a brief seven-day stint under Prime Minister Senjūrō Hayashi.

Afterwards, Nakamura was appointed commander of the Eastern District Army, and was promoted to full general in 1938. Nakamura then became commander of the Chosen Army from 1938 to 1941.

From 1941 until his retirement due to poor health in 1943, Nakamura served as a member of the Supreme War Council. Nakamura died shortly after the end of World War II on 29 August 1947.

== Notes ==
Political offices
| Preceded by Hisaichi Terauchi | Army Minister; 2 February 1937 – 9 February 1937 | Succeeded by Hajime Sugiyama |
Military offices
| Preceded by Shizuichi Tanaka | Commander Eastern District Army; December 1941 – May 1943 | Succeeded by Kenji Doihara |
| Preceded by Kuniaki Koiso | Commander IJA Chosen Army; July 1938 – July 1941 | Succeeded by Seishirō Itagaki |
| Preceded by Kohei Kashii | Commander IJA China Garrison Army; February 1932 – March 1934 | Succeeded by Yoshijirō Umezu |
