= Otozō Yamada =

Japanese general and war criminal (1881–1965)

- 山田 乙三
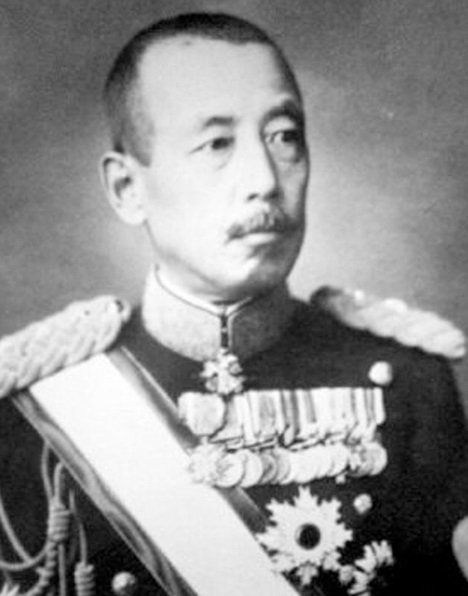

18th Governor-General of the Kwantung Leased Territory
- In office 18 July 1944 – 28 August 1945
- Monarch: Hirohito
- Preceded by: Yoshijirō Umezu
- Succeeded by: Office abolished
Additional positions
Japanese Ambassador to Manchukuo
In office 18 July 1944 – 15 August 1945
Monarch	Hirohito
Prime Minister	Hideki Tojo; Kuniaki Koiso; Kantarō Suzuki
Preceded by	Yoshijirō Umezu
Succeeded by	Position abolished
Member of the Supreme War Council
In office 14 October 1939 – 18 July 1944
Monarch	Hirohito

Personal details
- Born: 6 November 1881 Nagano Prefecture, Japan
- Died: 18 July 1965 (aged 83) Tokyo, Japan
- Education: Imperial Japanese Army Academy; Army War College

Military service
- Allegiance: Empire of Japan
- Branch/service: Imperial Japanese Army
- Years of service: 1903–1945
- Rank: General
- Commands: 12th Division; Third Army; Central China Expeditionary Army; General Defense Command; Kwantung Army
- Battles/wars: Russo-Japanese War; World War I; World War II; Second Sino-Japanese War; Soviet–Japanese War
- Criminal information
- Status: Deceased
- Conviction: War crimes
- Trial: Khabarovsk war crimes trials
- Penalty: 25 years imprisonment with hard labor

Otozō Yamada (山田 乙三, Yamada Otozō; 6 November 1881 – 18 July 1965) was a career officer, convicted war criminal and general in the Imperial Japanese Army, serving from the Russo-Japanese War to the end of World War II.

== Biography ==
=== Early career ===
Yamada was born in Nagano Prefecture as the third son of Ichikawa Katashi, an accountant in the Imperial Japanese Army, and was adopted by the Yamada family as a child. He graduated from the 14th class of the Imperial Japanese Army Academy in 1903, and his classmates included future generals Motoo Furushō and Toshizō Nishio. He was promoted to lieutenant in February 1905 and taught as an instructor at the Army Academy, and was promoted to captain in September 1912. He graduated from the 24th class of the Army Staff College in November, where his classmates included Kenji Doihara, Kiyoshi Katsuki, Hisao Tani, and Yanagawa Heisuke.

As a cavalry officer, his rise through the ranks was steady. He was promoted to major in June 1918 and appointed an instructor at the Army Cavalry School, receiving a promotion to lieutenant-colonel in August 1922. In August 1925, he was promoted to colonel and appointed commander of the IJA 26th Cavalry Regiment. In 1926, he was Chief of Staff of the Chosen Army. He served in the communications section of the 3rd Bureau of the Imperial Japanese Army General Staff from 1927 to 1930.

Yamada was promoted to major general in August 1930 and appointed commandant of the Army Cavalry School. From 1931 to 1932, he returned to the field as commander of the IJA 4th Cavalry Brigade, before resuming a number of administrative positions (including that of commandant of the Imperial Japanese Army Academy) to 1937. He was awarded the Order of the Sacred Treasure, 2nd class in February 1934 and promoted to lieutenant general in August 1934.

=== World War II ===
With the start of the Second Sino-Japanese War in 1937, Yamada was named commander of the IJA 12th Division, based in Manchukuo. During that period, the 12th Division was an elite unit, with a disproportionately large amount of firepower and heavy equipment. He became commander of the IJA 3rd Army in 1938, and that of the Central China Expeditionary Army from 1938 to 1939.

Yamada was promoted to full general in August 1940, and was recalled to Japan to assume the post of Inspector-General of Military Training from 1940 to 1944. He also served as a member of the Supreme War Council during this period. In May 1943 he was promoted to the honorific title of Third Court Rank.

In 1944, with the resignation of Prime Minister Hideki Tojo, Yamada fell from political favor, and was reassigned in July back to Manchukuo as the final commander of the Kwantung Army, and he concurrently held the positions of Japanese ambassador to Manchukuo and Governor-General of the Kwantung Leased Territory. He quickly advised Imperial General Headquarters that it would be impossible to hold the border with the Soviet Union with the forces allocated, as the Kwantung Army had largely been hollowed out with redeployment of experienced troops (with most of their equipment) to the Pacific theater of the war. With no aid forthcoming from Japan, Yamada attempted to organize large numbers of poorly trained conscripts and volunteers into eight new infantry divisions and seven new infantry brigades, and to withdraw from border areas to protect the strategic core of the nation. However, when the Soviet Army invaded Manchuria on 9 August 1945, many of Yamada's makeshift forces were no more than 15% combat ready and were quickly overrun.

At the surrender of Japan, Yamada was taken as a prisoner of war to Khabarovsk in the Soviet Union. He was a defendant in the Khabarovsk War Crime Trials and was sentenced to 25 years in a Gulag labor camp for war crimes. During his trial, he admitted to authorizing the use of "Ishii bombs", fragile porcelain grenades containing typhus and bubonic plague bacteria, which had been developed by Unit 731 for use in bacteriological warfare. Yamada was also found to have presided over and encouraged biochemical weapon experimentation on involuntary human subjects, resulting in the torture and murder of thousands of people. In 1950 he was transferred to NKVD special camp No. 48 where a secret Soviet biological weapons facility was established.

In December 1956, Yamada was released with the Soviet–Japanese Joint Declaration of 1956 normalization diplomatic relations between Japan and the Soviet Union, and was repatriated to Japan, where he died in 1965.

== Decorations ==
- 1934 – Order of the Sacred Treasure, 2nd class

Government offices
Preceded by Yoshijirō Umezu	Governor-General of Kwantung; 1944–1945	Succeeded by none
Military offices
Preceded by Yoshishige Shimizu	Commander of 12th Division; March 1937 – Jan 1938	Succeeded by Uemura Seitaro
Preceded by Nogi Maresuke	Commander of 3rd Army; Jan 1938-Dec 1938	Succeeded by Hayao Tada
Preceded by Shunroku Hata	Commander, Central China Expeditionary Army; Dec 1938 – September 1939	Succeeded by none
Preceded by Toshizō Nishio	Inspector-General of Military Training; October 1940 – July 1944	Succeeded by Hajime Sugiyama
Preceded by none	Commander, General Defense Command; July 1941 –Dec 1941	Succeeded by Prince Naruhiko Higashikuni
Preceded by Yoshijirō Umezu	Commander, Kwantung Army; July 1944 – September 1945	Succeeded by none
