= First General Army =

- Japanese: 第1総軍 (日本軍); Dai-ichi Sōgun
- Active: April 8, 1945 – November 30, 1945
- Country: Empire of Japan
- Allegiance: Emperor of Japan
- Branch: Imperial Japanese Army
- Type: General Army
- Garrison/HQ: Tokyo
- Nicknames: Toho (東方, Eastern)
- Engagements: None (Operation Downfall)

The First General Army (第1総軍 (日本軍), Dai-ichi Sōgun) was a general army (army group equivalent) of the Imperial Japanese Army, established for the defense of eastern and northern Honshū (including the Tōkai and Kantō regions) during the final stage of the Pacific War.

== History ==
The First General Army was established on April 8, 1945, with the dissolution of the General Defense Command into the First and Second General Army. It was essentially a home guard and garrison, responsible for civil defense, anti-aircraft defenses, and for organizing guerilla warfare cells in anticipation of the projected Allied invasion of the Japanese home islands in Operation Downfall (or Operation Ketsugō (決号作戦, Ketsugō sakusen) in Japanese terminology). Although its territory encompassed all of northern Japan, its primary mission was to ensure the security of the heavily populated Kantō region, which included Tokyo. Its forces consisted mostly of poorly trained and poorly armed reservists, conscripted students and home guard militia.

The First General Army remained active for several months after the surrender of Japan to help maintain public order until the arrival of the American occupation forces, and to oversee the final demobilization and dissolution of the Imperial Japanese Army.

== Commanders ==
=== Commanding officer ===
	Name	From	To
1	Field Marshal Hajime Sugiyama	7 April 1945	12 September 1945
2	General Kenji Doihara	14 September 1945	23 September 1945
3	General Yoshijirō Umezu	23 September 1945	1 October 1945
4	General Masakazu Kawabe	1 October 1945	30 November 1945

=== Chief of Staff ===
	Name	From	To
1	Lieutenant General Einosuke Sudo	6 April 1945	30 October 1945

== See also ==
- Armies of the Imperial Japanese Army
- Japanese holdout
