= Central China Expeditionary Army =

- Japanese: 中支那派遣軍; Nakashina hakengun
- Active: November 7, 1937 - September 23, 1939
- Country: Empire of Japan
- Branch: Imperial Japanese Army
- Type: Infantry
- Role: Army Corps
- Engagements: Battle of Xuzhou; Battle of Wuhan

Central China Expeditionary Army (中支那派遣軍, Nakashina Hakengun) was a field army of the Imperial Japanese Army during the Second Sino-Japanese War.

On November 7, 1937 Japanese Central China Area Army (CCAA) was organized as a reinforcement expeditionary army by combining the Shanghai Expeditionary Army (SEF) and the IJA Tenth Army. General Iwane Matsui was appointed as its commander-in-chief, concurrent with his assignment as commander-in-chief of the SEF. Matsui reported directly to Imperial General Headquarters. After the Battle of Nanjing, the CCAA was disbanded on February 14, 1938 and its component units were reassigned to the Central China Expeditionary Army.

On September 12, 1939 by Army Order 362, the China Expeditionary Army was formed with the merger of the Central China Expeditionary Army with the Northern China Area Army.

== List of Commanders ==
=== Commanding officer ===
	Name	From	To
1	General Shunroku Hata	14 February 1938	14 December 1938
2	Lieutenant General Otozō Yamada	15 December 1938	23 September 1939

=== Chief of Staff ===
	Name	From	To
1	General Masakazu Kawabe	15 February 1938	30 January 1939
2	Lieutenant General Teiichi Yoshimoto	31 January 1939	23 September 1939
