= Taiwanese Army (disambiguation) =

The Republic of China Army is commonly referred to as the Taiwanese Army.

Taiwanese Army may also refer to:

- Military of the Qing dynasty, which Taiwan was controlled from 1683 to 1895
- Taiwan Army of Japan, an Imperial Japanese Army garrison in Taiwan from 1919 to 1944
- Republic of China Armed Forces, the current military forces since 1945, of which the army is a component
  - Taiwan Garrison Command
