= Hisaichi Terauchi =

Japanese officer, war criminal (1879–1946)

Count Terauchi Hisaichi
- 寺内 寿一

Inspector-General of Military Training
- In office 9 February 1937 – 26 August 1937
- Monarch: Hirohito
- Preceded by: Hajime Sugiyama
- Succeeded by: Shunroku Hata

Minister of the Army
- In office 9 March 1936 – 2 February 1937
- Prime Minister: Kōki Hirota
- Preceded by: Yoshiyuki Kawashima
- Succeeded by: Kotaro Nakamura

Member of the Supreme War Council
- In office 9 December 1938 – 6 November 1941
- Monarch: Hirohito
- In office 2 February 1937 – 26 August 1937
- Monarch: Hirohito
- In office 2 December 1935 – 9 March 1936
- Monarch: Hirohito

Personal details
- Born: 8 August 1879 Tokyo, Japan
- Died: 12 June 1946 (aged 66) Renggam, Johor Bahru, Malayan Union
- Resting place: Japanese Cemetery Park, Singapore
- Parent: Terauchi Masatake (father)
- Education: Imperial Japanese Army Academy; Army War College
- Military career
- Allegiance: Japan
- Branch: Imperial Japanese Army
- Service years: 1899–1945
- Rank: Field Marshal
- Commands: 5th Division; 4th Division; Taiwan Army of Japan; Northern China Area Army; Southern Expeditionary Army Group
- Conflicts: Russo-Japanese War; Second Sino-Japanese War; Beiping–Hankou Railway Operation; Battle of Xuzhou; Battle of Lanfeng; Battle of Mount Song; World War II; South West Pacific theatre; Kokoda Track campaign; South East Asian theatre
- Awards: Order of the Rising Sun (1st class); Order of the Golden Kite (1st Class)

Count Hisaichi Terauchi (寺内 寿一, Terauchi Hisaichi; 8 August 1879 – 12 June 1946) (Note: Former spelling 寺內 壽一; his name has also been transcribed Juichi Terauchi, by reading the kanji 寿 (formerly 壽) as go-on jū (じゅ) rather than nanori hisa (ひさ).) was a Gensui (or field marshal) in the Imperial Japanese Army, commander of the Southern Expeditionary Army Group during World War II.

== Biography ==
=== Early military career ===
Terauchi was born in Tokyo Prefecture, and was the eldest son of Gensui Count Terauchi Masatake, the first Governor-General of Korea and the 9th Prime Minister of Japan. When he was four, his father was transferred to France, and he was sent to live with his maternal aunt in Yamaguchi. Due to his family's close connections with former Chōshū Domain, he was officially registered as a resident of Yamaguchi Prefecture around that time. After his father returned from an overseas assignment, the family moved back to Tokyo. He graduated from the 11th class of the Imperial Japanese Army Academy in 1899, and served as a junior officer in the Russo-Japanese War with the Guards 2nd Infantry Battalion.

After the war, Terauchi returned to the Army Staff College and graduated from the 21st class in 1909. In July 1912, he was sent as a military attaché to Austria-Hungary and in July 1914 to Germany. He was promoted to lieutenant colonel in November 1916 and attached to the IJA 2nd Infantry Regiment in September 1917. He worked as several administrative posts within the Imperial Japanese Army General Staff from September 1918.

In early November 1919, he succeeded in the hereditary title of hakushaku (count) under the kazoku peerage system upon the death of his father, and was raised in military rank to colonel. In September 1920, he became commander of the 3rd Guards Infantry Battalion, and chief-of-staff of the Imperial Guard from September 1923.

=== As general ===
Terauchi was promoted to major general in February 1924 and was assigned to the staff of the IJA 1st Division in March 1926. In September 1926, the San'yō Main Line train he was riding on derailed in an accident that killed 34 people, but Terauchi was not injured.

In August 1927, Terauchi became Chief of Staff of the Chosen Army in Korea. He was promoted to lieutenant general in August 1929 and was assigned command of the Hiroshima-based IJA 5th Division. In January 1932, he was transferred to the Osaka-based IJA 4th Division. He was the leading military commander in Osaka during the notorious "Go-Stop Incident", in which the verbal altercation between two young men—an off-duty soldier in uniform who had ignored a traffic light and a policeman, which developed into fistfights, and finally into a ministerial-level conflict between the Home Ministry and the Army. Terauchi demanded an official apology from the Osaka police, insisting that the policeman had unfairly injured the Army's prestige.The Osaka police refused to apologize, stating that military personnel should also observe the law. However, the Home Ministry and the Army concluded later an agreement that precluded the civilian police from handling crimes committed by military personnel, which effectively placed military personnel above the law.

In August 1934, Terauchi was transferred to command the Taiwan Army of Japan. He was promoted to full general in October 1935.

=== Military-political career ===
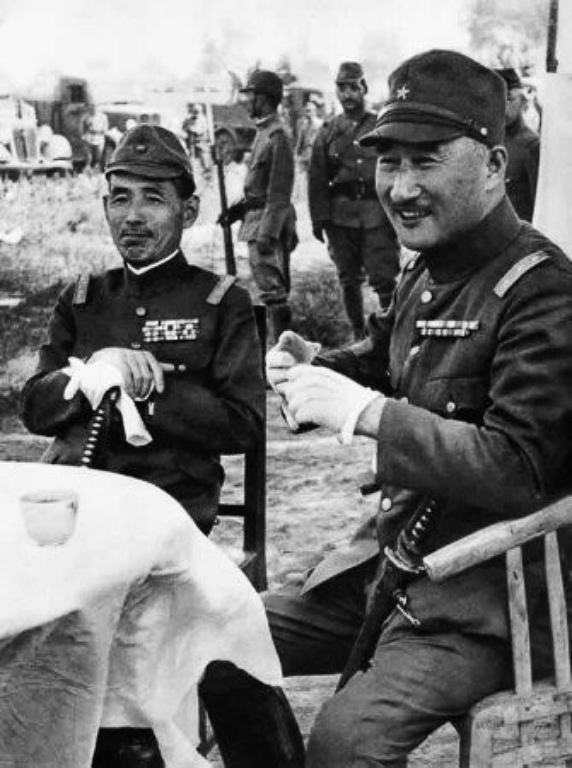
Count Terauchi (right) with General Shunroku Hata celebrating the Japanese victory in Xuzhou, 1938

After the February 26th Incident, Terauchi briefly served as interim Army Minister in March 1936 in the cabinet of Prime Minister Kōki Hirota. During his term, he began an extensive purge against the Imperial Way Faction members within the military and supported the Control Faction. His inflammatory rhetoric brought about the collapse of the Hirota administration in January 1937 when he engaged in a verbal shouting match against Speaker of the House Kunimatsu Hamada, accusing him of defaming the Army. Hamada retorted that he did not insult the Army, and would commit seppuku if it could be proven otherwise. On the other hand, Hamada said that Terauchi should commit seppuku himself if his accusation should be proven false. This clash further intensified the conflict between the military and the civilian political parties in the Japanese Diet.

=== World War II ===
In February 1937, Terauchi was appointed head of the Inspectorate General of Military Training, the third-most prestigious post in the military. With the outbreak of the Second Sino-Japanese War, Terauchi was assigned combat duty and was given command of the North China Area Army in August 1937. He was awarded the Grand Cordon of the Order of the Rising Sun in 1938.

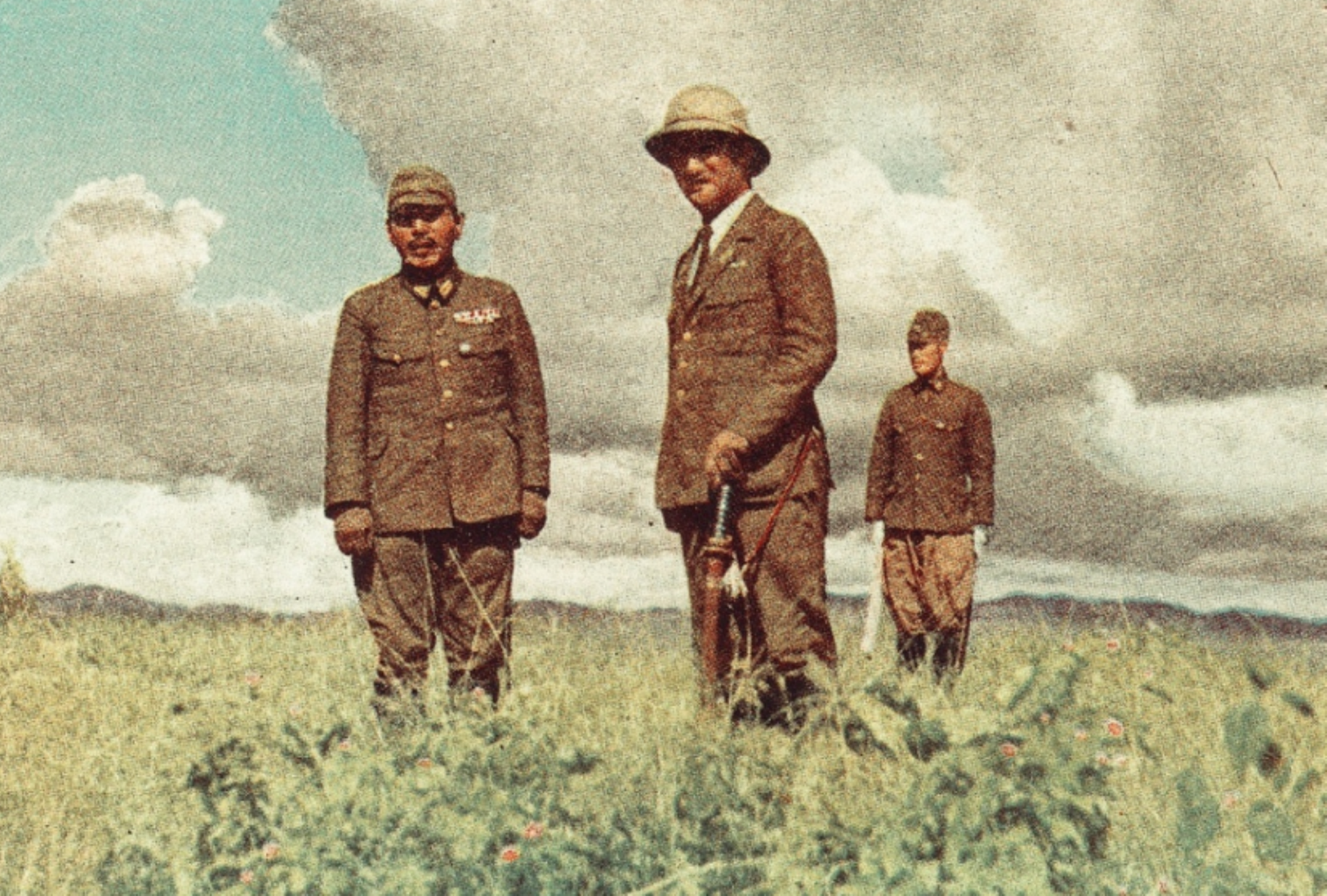
Terauchi Hisaichi in Singapore, 1942

In November 1941, Terauchi was transferred to command of the Southern Expeditionary Army Group and soon afterward began coordinating war plans with Admiral Yamamoto Isoroku for the Pacific War. After leading the conquest of Southeast Asia, Terauchi established his headquarters in Singapore. He received the Order of the Golden Kite, 1st class, in March 1942. Promoted to Gensui (Field Marshal) on 6 June 1943, he relocated to the Philippines in May 1944. When this area came under threat from the Allied attack, he retreated to Saigon in French Indochina. Soon after receiving word of the loss of Burma by Japan, he suffered a stroke on 10 May 1945.

As the war in the Pacific drew to a close, a British Intelligence Liaison Officer, Major Richard Holbrook McGregor, was sent by Admiral Mountbatten to Saigon to verify that Count Terauchi was indeed in a hospital and unable to make the flight to RAF Mingaladon Airfield to personally discuss terms of a cease-fire. Instead, the remaining 680,000 Japanese soldiers in Southeast Asia were surrendered on his behalf in Singapore on 12 September 1945 by General Seishirō Itagaki. Terauchi personally surrendered to Mountbatten on 30 November 1945 in Saigon. On 12 June 1946, he suffered from another stroke at Renggam, Johor Bahru, Malaya while being transferred to a prisoner of war camp and died. He was buried at the Japanese cemetery in Singapore.

The 2nd Count Terauchi surrendered his family heirloom wakizashi short sword to Mountbatten in Saigon in 1945. The sword dates from 1413, and is now kept at Windsor Castle. It was almost the subject of a diplomatic incident in the mid-1980s, when Queen Elizabeth The Queen Mother wanted to place it on prominent display during a dinner held for Crown Prince Akihito of Japan. However, her daughter, Queen Elizabeth II, vetoed the idea.

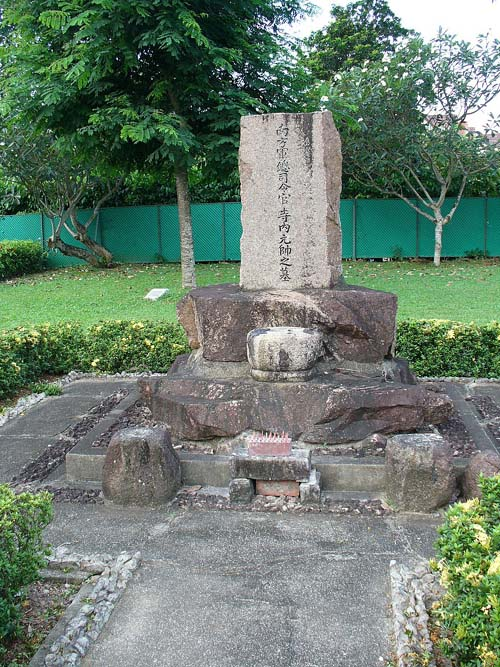
Memorial to Terauchi in the Japanese Cemetery Park, Singapore

== War crimes ==
Count Terauchi was given command of Southern Expeditionary Army, responsible for the opening Japanese offensive of the Pacific War. He was critical of Masaharu Homma for being too "soft" on Filipinos and of Hitoshi Imamura for being too lenient to the Indonesian independence movement. Terauchi's attitude likely played a role in Homma's subsequent relief and retirement.

Terauchi thought the army should stay out of politics, by which he probably meant that the politicians should keep their hands off the army. In other respects, he was a typically ruthless Imperial Japanese Army officer. Neither the Americans nor his own peers thought much of him, but his staff were impressed by the fact that such a wealthy man chose to live so frugally. Yamashita felt otherwise, writing in his diary that "... that damn Terauchi lives in luxury in Saigon, sleeps in a comfortable bed, eats good food and plays shogi". Yamashita added that:

If there are two ways of doing something, trust Southern Army to pick the wrong one.

When told that Terauchi was in too poor health to attend the surrender ceremony at Singapore, Mountbatten sent his own doctor to examine Terauchi. The doctor confirmed his fragile health, and Mountbatten had him transferred to a bungalow in Malaya in March 1946. On 11 June 1946, Terauchi became angered by a report of a Kempeitai lieutenant colonel who had threatened to disclose Japanese war crimes to the Allies, and he suffered a second massive stroke and died early the next morning. As a consequence, he never stood trial for war crimes, such as his responsibility for mistreatment of laborers on the Burma-Siam Railroad and his order that all Allied prisoners of war in his command area were to be massacred if Japan was invaded.

== Sources ==
- Aldous, Christopher (1997), Police in Occupation Japan, CRC Press, p. 41, ISBN 978-0-203-44014-8
- Ammenthorp, Steen (2000). "Terauchi, Hisaichi". The Generals of World War II.
- Boatner, Mark Mayo (1996). Biographical dictionary of World War II. Novato, CA. ISBN 0-89141-548-3.
- Budge, Kent (2015). "Terauchi, Hisaichi". Pacific War Online Encyclopedia.
- Drea, Edward J. (2009). Japan's Imperial Army : its rise and fall, 1853-1945. Lawrence, Kan.: University Press of Kansas. ISBN 978-0-7006-1663-3.
- Fuller, Richard (1992). Shokan: Hirohito's Samurai. London: Arms and Armor. ISBN 1-85409-151-4.
- Harries, Meirion (1991). Soldiers of the sun : the rise and fall of the Imperial Japanese Army, 1868-1945. London: Heinemann. ISBN 9780434313525.
- Hayashi, Saburo (1959). Kogun: The Japanese Army in the Pacific War. Translated by Cox, Alvin D. Quantico, VA: The Marine Corps Association. ASIN B000ID3YRK.
- Hollingworth, Will (24 January 2006). "Queen nixed mum's surrender sword slight: book". The Japan Times.
- Tobe, Ryōichi (1998), 日本の近代 (in Japanese), vol. 9, Tokyo: Chūōkōron-sha, ISBN 978-4-12-490109-2
- Toland, John (1970). The Rising sun : the decline and fall of the Japanese Empire, 1936-1945. Toronto: Bantam. ISBN 0-553-20462-9.
- Large, Stephen (22 October 1992). Emperor Hirohito and Showa Japan: A Political Biography. London: Routledge. ISBN 0-415-03203-2.

== See also ==
- Dupuy, Trevor N. (1992). Harper Encyclopedia of Military Biography. New York: HarperCollins Publishers Inc. ISBN 0-7858-0437-4.
- Fukagawa, Hideki (1981). (陸海軍将官人事総覧 (陸軍篇)) Army and Navy General Personnel Directory (Army). Tokyo: Fuyo Shobo. ISBN 4829500026.
- Hata, Ikuhiko (2005). (日本陸海軍総合事典) Japanese Army and Navy General Encyclopedia. Tokyo: St. Martin's Press. ISBN 4130301357.

Political offices
Preceded by Yoshiyuki Kawashima	Army Minister; 9 March 1936 – 2 February 1937	Succeeded by Kotaro Nakamura
Military offices
Preceded by none	Commander-in-Chief, IJA Southern Expeditionary Army Group; Nov 1941 – Aug 1945	Succeeded by none
Preceded by none	Commander, IJA North China Area Army; Aug 1937 – Dec 1938	Succeeded by Hajime Sugiyama
Preceded by Iwane Matsui	Commander, IJA Taiwan Army; Aug 1934 – Dec 1935	Succeeded by Heisuke Yanagawa
