= Second General Army =

- Japanese: 第2総軍 (日本軍); Dai-ni Sōgun
- Active: April 8, 1945 – November 30, 1945
- Country: Empire of Japan
- Allegiance: Emperor of Japan
- Branch: Imperial Japanese Army
- Type: General Army
- Garrison/HQ: Hiroshima
- Nicknames: Saiho (西方, Western)
- Engagements: None (Operation Downfall)

The Second General Army (第2総軍 (日本軍), Dai-ni Sōgun) was a general army (army group equivalent) of the Imperial Japanese Army responsible for the defense of western Honshū, Kyūshū and Shikoku during the final stage of the Pacific War. It was commanded by Field Marshal Shunroku Hata.

== History ==
The Second General Army was established on April 8, 1945 with the dissolution of the General Defense Command into the First and Second General Army. It was essentially a home guard and garrison, responsible for civil defense, anti-aircraft defenses, and for organizing guerrilla warfare cells in anticipation of the projected Allied invasion of the Japanese home islands in Operation Downfall (or Operation Ketsugō (決号作戦, Ketsugō sakusen) in Japanese terminology). Although its territory encompassed all of western Japan, its primary mission was to ensure the security of southern Kyūshū, which was regarded as the most probable target for invasion. Its forces consisted mostly of poorly trained reservists, conscripted students and home guard militia.

After the fall of Okinawa, the command of the Second General Army was relocated to Hiroshima. When the atomic bomb was dropped on Hiroshima, most of the military units, logistical arms, and command staff of the Second General Army were killed, although Field Marshal Hata himself was only slightly wounded. Together with the Fifth Division, Fifty-Ninth Army, and other combat divisions in the city who were also hit, an estimated 20,000 Japanese combatants were killed.

Survivors regrouped at Ujina Air Base at the outskirts of Hiroshima, where they organized relief efforts and maintained public order in Hiroshima once martial law was proclaimed. However, the atomic bombing ended the Second General Army as an effective military organization for Imperial Japanese Army units in western Japan. Elements remained in place under the American occupation authorities until November 1945 to assist with the demobilization of Japanese troops.

== Commanders ==
=== Commanding officer ===
| | Name | From | To |
|---|---|---|---|
| 1 | Field Marshal Shunroku Hata | 5 April 1945 | 15 October 1945 |

=== Chief of Staff ===
| | Name | From | To |
|---|---|---|---|
| 1 | Lieutenant General Tadakazu Wakamatsu | 6 April 1945 | 18 July 1945 |
| 2 | Lieutenant General Seisaburo Okazaki | 18 July 1945 | 15 October 1945 |

== See also ==
- Armies of the Imperial Japanese Army
