= Western District Army =

- Active: August 1, 1937 – November 30, 1945
- Country: Empire of Japan
- Branch: Imperial Japanese Army
- Type: Infantry
- Role: Field Army
- Engagements: Operation Downfall

The Western District Army (西部方面軍, Seibu-hōmen gun) was a regional command of the Imperial Japanese Army (equivalent to a field army) responsible for the defense of the Kantō region and western Honshū, Shikoku and Kyūshū during the Pacific War. It was one of the regional commands in the Japanese home islands reporting to the General Defense Command.

== History ==
The Western District Army was established on 2 August 1937 as part of the regional realignment of the Imperial Japanese Army as the Western Defense Command (西部防衛司令部, Seibu Boei Shireibu). It was essentially a home guard and garrison responsible for recruitment and civil defense.

On 1 August 1940, it was renamed again as the Western Army (西部軍, Seibu-gun), which became the Western District Army on 1 February 1945.

The Western District Army existed concurrently with the Japanese 16th Area Army and the Japanese 15th Area Army, which were tasked with organizing the final defenses of Kyūshū and Shikoku against the expected American invasion of the Japanese home islands. The Western District Army assumed all administrative functions, whereas the individual area armies were operational combat commands.

The Western District Army remained active for several months after the surrender of Japan to help maintain public order until the arrival of the American occupation forces, and to oversee the final demobilization and dissolution of the Imperial Japanese Army.

== Commanders ==
=== Commanding officer ===
	Name	From	To
1	Lieutenant General Tomou Kodama	2 August 1937	15 July 1938
2	Lieutenant General Takuro Matsui	15 July 1938	9 March 1940
3	Lieutenant General Heitaro Kamimura	9 March 1940	10 April 1941
4	General Keisuke Fujie	10 April 1941	22 March 1944
5	General Sadamu Shimomura	22 March 1944	22 November 1944
6	Lieutenant General Isamu Yokoyama	22 November 1944	13 October 1945
7	Lieutenant General Kanji Nishihara	13 October 1945	30 November 1945

=== Chief of Staff ===
	Name	From	To
1	Major General Shuntoku Nagami	2 August 1937	15 July 1938
2	Major General Rion NIshimura	15 July 1938	9 March 1940
3	Lieutenant General Kazuo Isa	9 March 1940	1 March 1941
4	Lieutenant General Shinnosuke Sasa	1 March 1941	22 December 1942
5	Lieutenant General Wataro Yoshinaka	22 December 1942	3 May 1945
6	Lieutenant General Masazumi Ineda	3 May 1945	13 October 1945

== See also ==
- Armies of the Imperial Japanese Army
