= Takuro Matsui =

Japanese military personnel (1887–1969)

Takurō Matsui
- 松井 太久郎
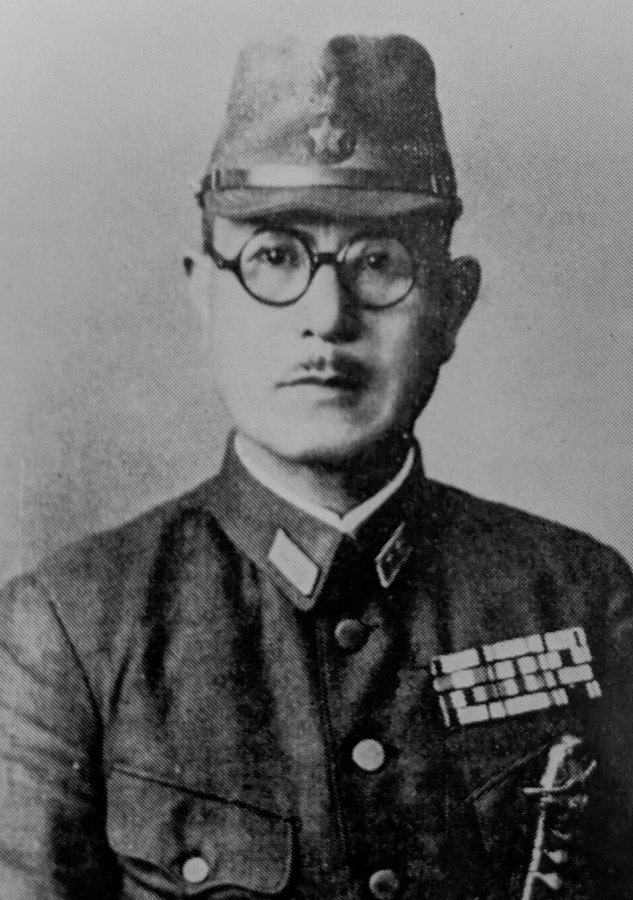
- Born: December 3, 1887; Fukuoka Prefecture, Japan
- Died: June 10, 1969 (aged 81)
- Military career
- Allegiance: Empire of Japan
- Branch: Imperial Japanese Army
- Rank: Lieutenant General
- Commands: Western District Army; 5th Division; China Expeditionary Army; Thirteenth Army
- Conflicts: Second Sino-Japanese War; World War II; Malayan campaign; Battle of Singapore

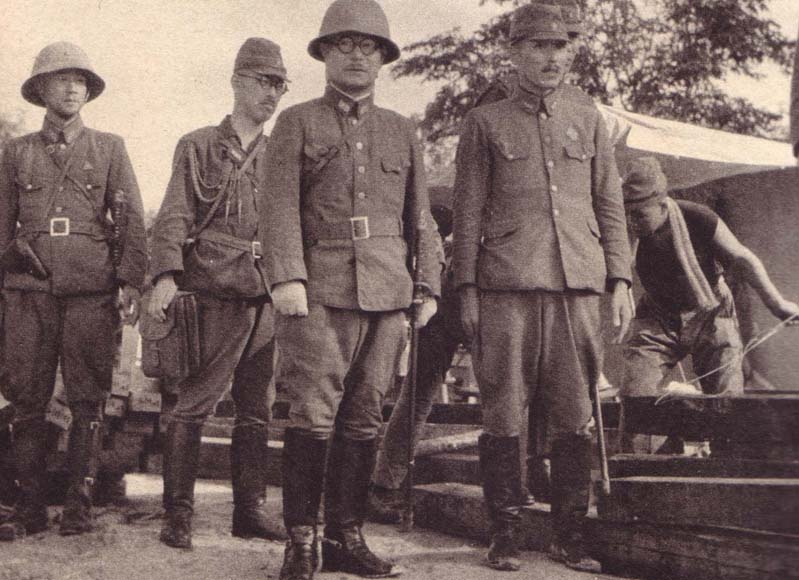
General lieutenant Takuro Matsui, Commander of the 5th Division, at the Battle of Singapore

Takurō Matsui (松井 太久郎; December 3, 1887 – June 10, 1969) was a lieutenant general in the Imperial Japanese Army during World War II.

Matsui commanded the Western District Army between July 15, 1938, and March 9, 1940.

He received command of the 5th Japanese Division on October 15, 1940, which fought at that time in China in the Second Sino-Japanese War. On December 8, 1941, his division landed on the beaches of Southern Thailand and fought with success in the Malayan campaign and the following Battle of Singapore.

On May 11, 1942, he was replaced at the head of the division by Lieutenant General Yamamoto Tsutomi.

On March 18, 1943, he became Chief of Staff of the China Expeditionary Army, a post he would hold until February 1, 1945, when he became commander of the Thirteenth Army, posted in the lower Yangtze River, until the end of the war.

== Sources ==
- Rottman, Gordon L. (2005). Japanese Army in World War II 1941–42. Osprey Publishing. ISBN 978-1-84176-789-5.
- Yenne, Bill (2014). The Imperial Japanese Army: The Invincible Years 1941–4. Osprey Publishing. ISBN 978-1-7820-0932-0.
