= Forty-Third Army (Japan) =

Japanese Forty-Third Army
- Active: March 10, 1945 – August 15, 1945
- Country: Empire of Japan
- Branch: Imperial Japanese Army
- Type: Infantry
- Role: Corps
- Garrison/HQ: Jinan, Shandong, China
- Nickname(s): 秀嶺
- Engagements: Operation Downfall

The Japanese 43rd Army (第43軍, Dai-yonjyūsan gun) was an army of the Imperial Japanese Army during the final stages of World War II.

== History ==
The Japanese 43rd Army was formed on March 10, 1945 under the Northern China Area Army as part of the last desperate defense effort by the Empire of Japan to deter possible landings of Allied forces in Shandong province during Operation Downfall. The Japanese 43rd Army consisted mostly of poorly trained and poorly equipped reservists from other units.

It was demobilized at the surrender of Japan on August 15, 1945 at Jinan without having seen combat.

== List of Commanders ==
	Name	From	To
Commanding officer	Lieutenant General Tadayasu Hosokawa	31 March 1945	September 1945
Chief of Staff	Major General Mitsuo Kubo	31 March 1945	1 June 1945
Chief of Staff	Major General Mitsuru Samukawa	1 June 1945	September 1945
