= Imperial General Headquarters =

Part of the Supreme War Council of Japan (1893–1945)

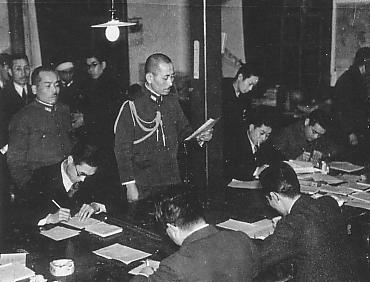
Imperial General Headquarters announcement, January 1942.

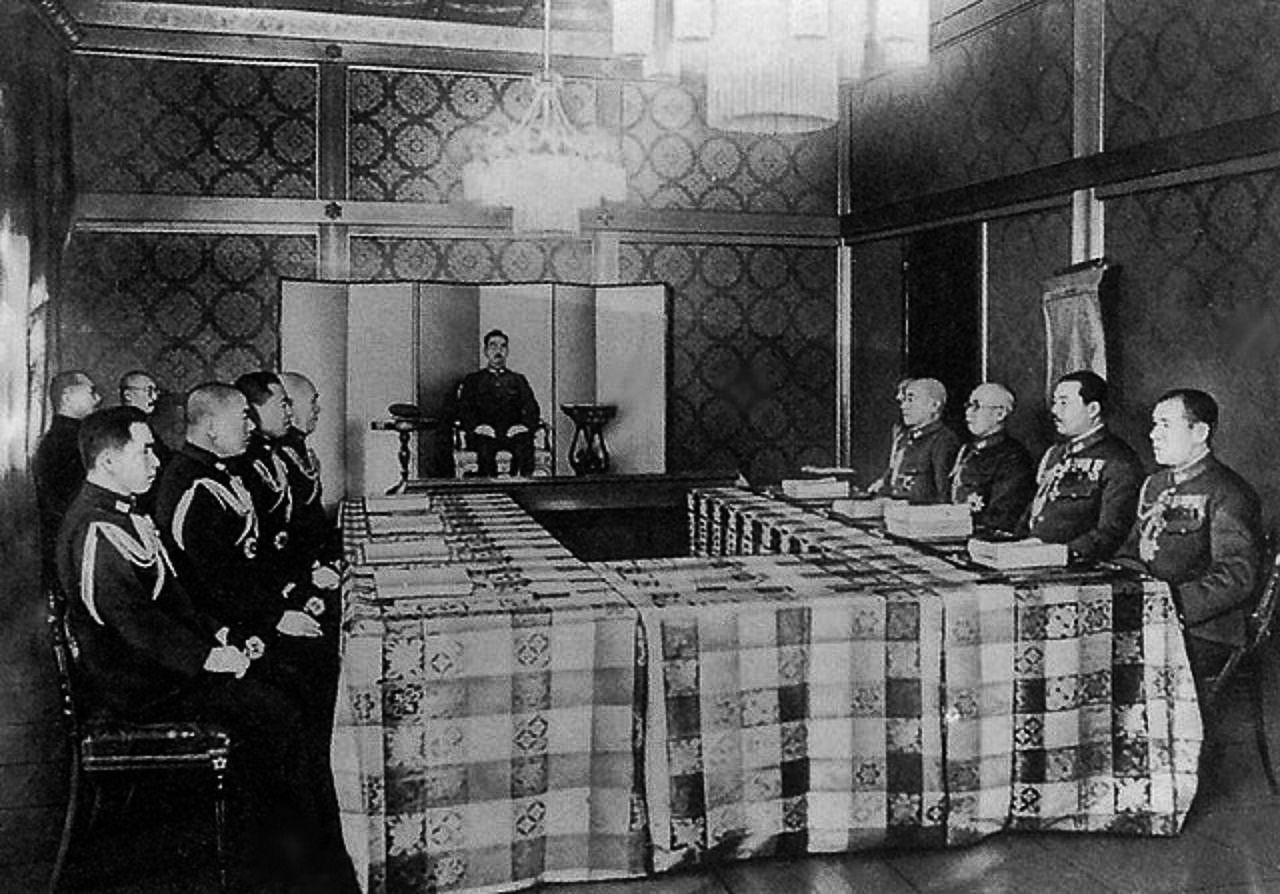
Emperor Hirohito, as head of the Imperial General Headquarters in 1943. Navy officers are seated to the left, while Army officers are seated to the right.

The Imperial General Headquarters (大本営, Daihon'ei) was part of the Supreme War Council and was established in 1893 to coordinate efforts between the Imperial Japanese Army and Imperial Japanese Navy during wartime. In terms of function, it was approximately equivalent to the United States Joint Chiefs of Staff and the British Chiefs of Staff Committee.

== History ==
The Imperial General Headquarters was established by Imperial Decree 52 on 22 May 1893 under the auspices of creating a central command for both the Imperial Japanese Army General Staff Office and the Imperial Japanese Navy General Staff. The Emperor of Japan who was defined as both Head of State and the Supreme Commander-in-chief of the Imperial Japanese Army and Navy according to the Meiji Constitution of 1889 to 1945, was the head of the Imperial General Headquarters, and was assisted by staff appointed from the Imperial Japanese Army and Imperial Japanese Navy.

The Imperial General Staff Headquarters was completely independent of the civilian government of the Empire of Japan, including the Cabinet and even the Prime Minister of Japan. Prime Minister Itō Hirobumi was allowed to attend meetings by the express order of Emperor Meiji during the First Sino-Japanese War. However, Prime Minister Katsura Taro, despite his military background, was denied entry to meetings during the subsequent Russo-Japanese War.

After the Lugouqiao Incident in July 1937, Imperial Decree 658 of 18 November 1937 abolished the original Imperial General Headquarters, which was then immediately re-constituted under Military Decree 1, which gave the new Imperial General Headquarters command authority over all military operations during peacetime situations as well as wartime situations.

In November 1937, to bring the chiefs of Army and Navy into closer consultation with his government, Emperor Hirohito established a body known as the Imperial General Headquarters-Government Liaison Conference within Imperial General Headquarters. The Liaison Conferences were intended to assist in integrating the decisions and needs of the two military sections of Imperial General Headquarters with the resources and policies of the rest of the government. Reaching agreement between the Army and Navy on strategic planning was often difficult. When agreement was finally reached on an important strategic issue, the agreement was reduced to writing in a document called a Central Agreement and signed by both Chiefs of Army and Navy General Staffs.

The final decisions of Liaison Conferences were formally disclosed and approved at Imperial Conferences over which Emperor Hirohito presided in person at the Tokyo Imperial Palace.

During the Pacific War, and after the firebombing of Tokyo, the Imperial General Headquarters relocated to an underground facility in the mountains outside Nagano.

With the surrender of Japan, the Supreme Commander of the Allied Powers ordered the Imperial General Headquarters abolished on 13 September 1945.

== Organization of the Imperial General Headquarters ==
Imperial General Headquarters comprised Army and Navy Sections. The Army Section comprised the Chief of Army General Staff and his chief of Army Operations, and the Army Minister. The Navy Section comprised Chief of Navy General Staff, his chief of Navy Operations, and the Navy Minister. In addition, the Inspector-General of Military Training, whose rank was almost on-par with that of the Chiefs of the General Staff, and the Aide-de-camp to the Emperor of Japan were also members.

Middle-ranking officers of Army and Navy General Staff, and Army and Navy Ministry, met from time to time at middle-level liaison or study conferences to discuss Japan's strategic war plans, and especially, plans requiring cooperation between the two armed services, outside of the formal meeting in the presence of the Emperor.

Relations between the Japanese Army and Navy were never cordial, and often marked by deep hostility. The Army saw the Soviet Union as Japan's greatest threat and for the most part supported the Hokushin-ron (Strike North concept) that Japan's strategic interests were on the Asian continent. The Navy looked across the Pacific Ocean and saw the United States as the greatest threat, and for the most part supported the Nanshin-ron (Strike South concept) that Japan's strategic interests were in Southeast Asia and the Pacific islands.

=== Organization during World War II ===
Hirohito, the Emperor of Japan, was defined as the Head of State and the Generalissimo of the Imperial Japanese Armed Forces according to the constitution of 1889. During World War II, the leadership of the Imperial General Headquarters consisting of the following:

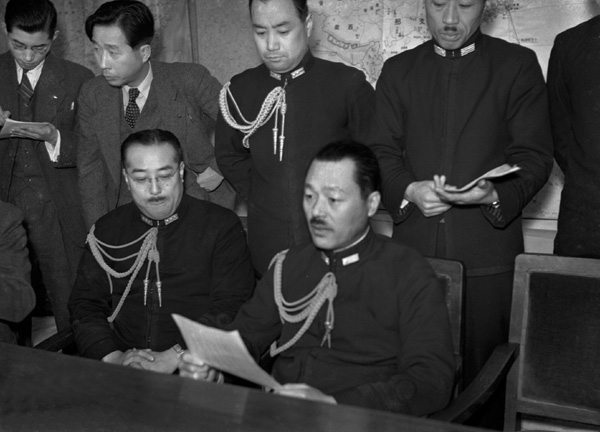
Announcement from Imperial General Headquarters January 1942

- Chief of the Army General Staff
  - Kotohito Kan'in (1931–1940)
  - Hajime Sugiyama (1940–1944)
  - Hideki Tōjō (1944)
  - Yoshijirō Umezu (1944–1945)
- Chief of the Navy General Staff
  - Hiroyasu Fushimi (1932–1941)
  - Osami Nagano (1941–1944)
  - Shigetarō Shimada (1944)
  - Koshirō Oikawa (1944–1945)
  - Soemu Toyoda (1945)
- Minister of the Army
  - Hajime Sugiyama (1937–1938, 1944–1945)
  - Seishirō Itagaki (1938–1939)
  - Shunroku Hata (1939–1940)
  - Hideki Tōjō (1940–1944)
  - Korechika Anami (1945)
- Minister of the Navy
  - Mitsumasa Yonai (1937–1939, 1944–1945)
  - Zengo Yoshida (1939–1940)
  - Koshirō Oikawa (1940–1941)
  - Shigetarō Shimada (1941–1944)
  - Naokuni Nomura (1944)

=== Organization of the Imperial Japanese Army – December 8, 1941 ===
The majority of these troops were stationed in China, Indochina, Japan, Taiwan, and Korea. This includes some 61 divisions, 59 brigades, and 51 air squadrons. Only a fraction of Japan's military, 11 to 14 divisions and the South Seas Detachment, were available for the December 1941 operations in South-East Asia and the Pacific.

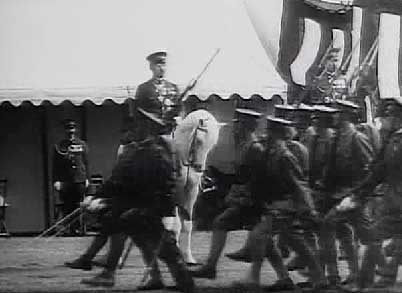
Soldiers parading before the Showa Emperor Hirohito on Shirayuki, from an unknown newsreel circa c. 1930s

- Imperial General Headquarters
  - IJA General Staff
    - General Affairs Bureau
      - Organization and Mobilization Department
      - Training Department
    - 1st (Operations) Bureau
      - Operations Department
      - Defence Department
    - 2nd (Intelligence) Bureau
      - Europe and the Americas Department
      - China Department
      - Russia/Soviet Union Department
      - Intelligence Department
    - 3rd (Transport and Communications) Bureau
      - Transport Department
      - Communications Department
    - 4th (Historical) Bureau
      - Military History Department
      - Strategy and Tactics Department
    - General Staff College
    - Land Survey Department
  - Ministry Of War
  - General Defense Command
  - China Expeditionary Army
  - Kwantung Army
  - Southern Expeditionary Army Group
  - Units under direct General Staff control
    - Imperial Japanese Army Air Service
    - 4th Infantry Division
    - South Seas Detachment
    - 1st Army Hospital
    - 2nd Army Hospital
    - 3rd Army Hospital
    - Korean Remount Department
    - Army Air Service Transport Department
    - IGHQ Communications Department

== Daihon'ei Happyou ==
In November 1937, the headquarters started radioing news on the war to the public. They were fairly accurate at first, but their accuracy quickly deteriorated after the severe defeat at Midway and became worse and worse toward the end of the war. As a result, the phrase "announcement from the Imperial General Headquarters" (大本営発表, daihon'ei happyou) came to mean "dubious official announcements by authorities" in general after the Second World War, a usage survived to the 21st century.

== See also ==
- List of Japanese government and military commanders of World War II
- Military history of Japan
- Imperial Japanese Army
- Imperial Japanese Navy
