= Army group =

Military unit designation

NATO Map Symbols

a friendly army group
a hostile army group

An army group is a military organization consisting of several field armies, which is self-sufficient for indefinite periods. It is usually responsible for a particular geographic area. An army group is the largest field organization handled by a single commander – usually a full general or field marshal – and it generally includes between 400,000 and 1,000,000 soldiers.

In the Polish Armed Forces and former Soviet Red Army an army group was known as a Front. The equivalent of an army group in the Imperial Japanese Army was a "general army" (Sō-gun (総軍)).

Army groups may be multi-national formations. For example, during World War II, the Southern Group of Armies (also known as the U.S. 6th Army Group) comprised the U.S. Seventh Army and the French First Army; the 21st Army Group comprised the British Second Army, the Canadian First Army and the US Ninth Army.

In both Commonwealth and U.S. usage, the number of an army group is expressed in Arabic numerals (e.g., "12th Army Group"), while the number of a field army is spelled out (e.g., "Third Army").

== World War I ==
=== France ===
The French Army formed a number of groupes d'armées during the First World War.

- Army Group North, formed on a provisional basis in October 1914.
- Army Group East, created in 1915
- Army Group Centre, created in 1915
- Army Group Reserve was established in 1917.
- Army Group Flanders, created in September 1918 under the command of Albert I of Belgium, to conduct the Second Battle of Belgium as part of the Hundred Days Offensive.

=== Germany ===
The German Army formed its first two Heeresgruppen in 1915, to control forces on the eastern front. A total of eight army groups would ultimately be raised – four for service on each front, with one of the eastern front army groups being a multinational German and Austro-Hungarian formation. Originally the Imperial German army groups were not separate formations, but instead additional responsibilities granted to certain army commanders. Crown Prince Wilhelm for instance, was simultaneously commander of the 5th Army and Army Group German Crown Prince from August 1915 to November 1916.

All eight German army groups were named after their commanders.

- Army Group Mackensen (Poland) (22 Apr 1915 - 8 Sep 1915)
  - Army Group Linsingen (8 Sep 1915 - 31 Mar 1918)
  - Army Group Eichhorn-Kiev (31 Mar 1918 - 30 Apr 1918)
  - Army Group Eichhorn (30 Apr 1918 - 31 Jul 1918)
  - Army Group Kiev (31 Jul 1918 - 3 Feb 1919)
- Army Group Mackensen (Serbia) (18 Sep 1915 - 30 July 1916)
  - Army Group Below (11 Oct 1916 - 21 Apr 1917)
  - Army Group Scholtz (23 Apr 1917 - 6 Oct 1918)
- Army Group Mackensen (Romania) (28 Aug 1916 - 7 May 1918)
- Army Group Prince Leopold of Bavaria (5 Aug 1915 - 29 Aug 1916)
  - Army Group Woyrsch (29 Aug 1916 - 15 Dec 1917)
- Army Group Gallwitz (1916) (19 Jul 1916 - 28 Aug 1916)
  - Army Group Rupprecht of Bavaria (A) (28 Aug 1916 - 11 Nov 1918)
- Army Group German Crown Prince (B) (1 Aug 1915 - 11 Nov 1918)
- Army Group Gallwitz (1918) (C) (1 Feb 1918 - 11 Nov 1918)
- Army Group Duke Albrecht of Württemberg (D) (7 Mar 1917 - 11 Nov 1918)
- Army Group Hindenburg (5 Aug 1915 - 30 Jul 1916)
  - Army Group Eichhorn (30 Jul 1916 - 31 Mar 1918)
  - Army Group Riga (31 Mar 1918 - 30 Apr 1918)
- Army Group Boehn (12 Aug 1918 - 8 Oct 1918 )

=== Ottoman Empire ===
The Ottoman Army had three army groups:

- Caucasus Army Group (8 Mar 1917 - 16 Dec 1917)
- Yildirim Army Group (F): also contained the German Asia Corps (July 1917 - 7 Nov 1918)
- Eastern Army Group (7 Jun 1918 - 21 October 1918)

== World War II ==
=== China ===
A Chinese "army group" was usually equivalent in numbers only to a field army in the terminology of other countries, as the regimental level was sometimes omitted.

=== Germany ===
See Heeresgruppen and Armeegruppen

The German Army was organized into army groups (Heeresgruppen). Some of these army groups included armies from several Axis countries. For example, Army Group Africa contained both German and Italian corps.

A separate and distinct German military unit (de:Armeegruppe), which is also translated to English as army group, describes more temporary groupings of army-sized units, where the command of one of its composite units formed the grouping's command structure. These groupings were usually named after the commander of the unit in question, for example Armeegruppe Weichs, part of Army Group B during Operation Blau in 1942.

=== Japan ===
During World War II there were six general armies:

- Kantōgun (often known as the "Kwantung Army") originated as the division-level garrison of a Japanese colony in northeast China, in 1908; it remained in northern China until the end of World War II. The strength of the Kantōgun peaked at 700,000 personnel in 1941. It faced and was destroyed by Soviet forces in 1945.
- Shina Hakengun, the "China Expeditionary Army", was formed in Nanjing, in September 1939, to control operations in central China. At the end of World War II, it consisted of 620,000 personnel in 25 infantry and one armored divisions.
- Nanpo Gun was the "Southern Army", also known as the "Southern Expeditionary Army". By November 1941, war with the western Allies appeared likely and Nanpo Gun was formed in Saigon, French Indochina, to control Imperial Japanese Army operations in southern China, South Asia, South East Asia, and the South Pacific.

In April 1945, the Boei So-Shireibu (translated as "general defense command" or "home defense general headquarters" and similar names) was split into three general armies:

- Dai-Ichi So-Gun ("1st General Army", headquartered in Tokyo)
- Dai-Ni So-Gun ("2nd General Army", headquartered in Hiroshima)
- Koku So-Gun ("Air General Army", headquartered in Tokyo)

By August 1945, these comprised two million personnel in 55 divisions and numerous smaller independent units. After the surrender of Japan, the Imperial Japanese Army was dissolved, except for the Dai-Ichi So-Gun, which existed until 30 November 1945 as the 1st Demobilization Headquarters.

=== Soviet Union ===
The Soviet Army was organized into fronts (фронт, pl. фронты) which were often as large as an army group. (See List of Soviet fronts in World War II.) Some of the fronts contained Allied formations raised in exile. For example, the Polish First Army was part of the 1st Belorussian Front.

=== Western Allies ===
The Western Allies established six separate army groups during the Second World War, although no more than five existed simultaneously. The army groups were subordinate to the Allied theatre supreme commanders. Led by British and American officers, they included troops from numerous allied nations; the British–American 15th Army Group also included Canadian and Polish corps, divisions from Brazil, India, New Zealand and South Africa and a Greek brigade. As part of Operation Quicksilver, the Allies set up a seventh, fictitious First United States Army Group.

Mediterranean/European Theater

- 18th Army Group: Established on 20 February 1943, under the command of General Harold Alexander for the Tunisia Campaign. A primarily British formation, it comprised the British First Army and Eighth Army, but included French and American corps. After the capture of Tunisia in May 1943 it was reorganized as the 15th Army Group.
- 15th Army Group: Established on 15 May 1943, under the command of General Harold Alexander for the Allied invasion of Italy. For the invasion of Sicily it consisted of the British Eighth Army and U.S. Seventh Army. Subsequently, the Seventh Army was replaced by the U.S. Fifth Army and Lieutenant General Mark W. Clark succeeded Alexander in December 1944.
- 21st Army Group: Established in June 1943 under the command of General Bernard Paget. In January 1944 Paget was replaced by General Bernard Montgomery who led the army group throughout Operation Overlord and the subsequent North West Europe Campaign. 21st Army Group was made up of the First Canadian Army and the British Second Army, but also had command of the First Allied Airborne Army, U.S. First Army and U.S. Ninth Army for some operations. After the breakout from Normandy, it formed the northern wing of the Allied Expeditionary Force and was sometimes referred to as the Northern Army Group.
- 12th Army Group: Established on 14 July 1944, the 12th Army Group was officially activated at noon on 1 August 1944, under the command of Lieutenant General Omar Bradley, with Lieutenant Generals Courtney Hodges and George Patton commanding First Army and Third Army, respectively. Eventually, 12th Army Group included Ninth Army under the command of Lieutenant General William Simpson and Fifteenth Army under the command of Lieutenant General "Gee" Gerow, it was the largest of the Western Allies' army groups in World War II. 12th Army Group occupied the middle of the Allied line, between the 21st and 6th Army Groups, and was sometimes referred to as the Central Army Group. This was the only army group in World War II that consisted entirely of U.S. troops. At its peak at end of the war, 12th Army Group consisted of the four aforementioned field armies, twelve corps, and over forty divisions – four-star General Bradley commanded over 1.3 million men in his army group, the largest number of American soldiers ever commanded by a single officer in the history of the United States Army.
- 6th Army Group: Established on 29 July 1944 under the command of Lieutenant General Jacob L. Devers for Operation Dragoon. Made up of the U.S. Seventh Army and the French First Army, it occupied the southern flank of the Allied Expeditionary Force in western Europe and was sometimes referred to as the Southern Army Group.

China Burma India Theater

- 11th Army Group: Established in November 1943 under the command of General George Giffard for the Burma Campaign. The 11th Army Group originally comprised the British Fourteenth Army and Ceylon Army, with a degree of control over the Sino-American Northern Combat Area Command. In November 1944 Giffard was succeeded by Lieutenant General Oliver Leese and firm command established over the Northern Combat Area Command. General William Slim replaced Leese in July 1945, shortly before the war ended in August 1945.

== NATO army groups ==
Northern Army Group

During the Cold War, NATO land forces in what was designated the Central Region (most of the Federal Republic of Germany) would have been commanded in wartime by two army groups. Under Allied Forces Central Europe and alongside air force elements, the two army groups would have been responsible for the defence of Germany against any Soviet/Warsaw Pact invasion. These two principal subordinate commanders had only limited peacetime authorities, and issues such as training, doctrine, logistics, and rules of engagement were largely a national, rather than NATO, responsibility.

The two formations were the Northern Army Group (NORTHAG) and the Central Army Group (CENTAG). By World War II and previous standards, these two formations were only armies, as they contained four corps each. NORTHAG consisted, from north to south, of I (Netherlands) Corps (I (NE) Corps), I German Corps (I (GE) Corps), I (BR) Corps, and I Belgian Corps (I (BE) Corps). Its commander was the British commander of the British Army of the Rhine (BAOR). CENTAG consisted, from north to south, of III (GE) Corps, V US Corps, VII (US) Corps, and II (GE) Corps in the extreme south of the Federal Republic of Germany. The commander of the U.S. Seventh Army commanded CENTAG.

In November 1991, the NATO heads of state and government adopted the "New Strategic Concept" at the NATO Summit in Rome. This new conceptual orientation led, among other things, to fundamental changes both in the force and integrated command structure. Structural changes began in June 1993, when HQ Central Army Group (CENTAG) at Heidelberg and Northern Army Group (NORTHAG) at Mönchengladbach were deactivated and replaced by Headquarters Allied Land Forces Central Europe (LANDCENT), which was activated at Heidelberg on 1 July 1993.
