= Hajime Sugiyama =

Imperial Japanese field marshal (1880–1945)

- 杉山 元
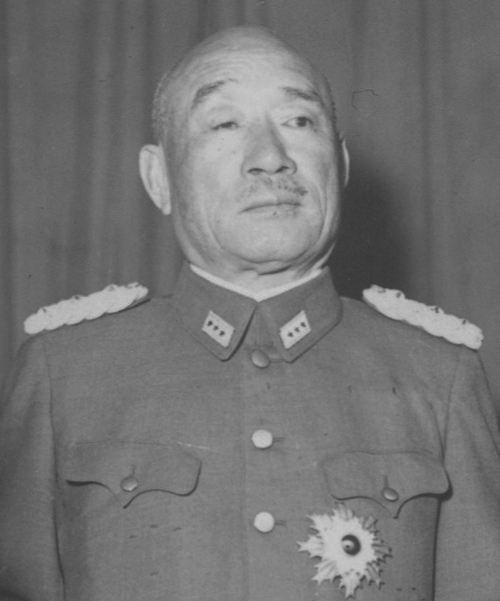

Minister of the Army Empire of Japan
- In office 22 July 1944 – 7 April 1945
- Prime Minister: Kuniaki Koiso
- Preceded by: Hideki Tojo
- Succeeded by: Korechika Anami
- In office 9 February 1937 – 3 June 1938
- Prime Minister: Senjūrō Hayashi; Fumimaro Konoe
- Preceded by: Kōtarō Nakamura
- Succeeded by: Seishirō Itagaki

Inspector-General of Military Training
- In office 18 July 1944 – 22 November 1944
- Monarch: Hirohito
- Preceded by: Otozō Yamada
- Succeeded by: Shunroku Hata
- In office 1 August 1936 – 9 February 1937
- Monarch: Hirohito
- Preceded by: Yoshikazu Nishi
- Succeeded by: Hisaichi Terauchi

Chief of the Imperial Japanese Army General Staff
- In office 3 September 1940 – 21 February 1944
- Monarch: Hirohito
- Prime Minister: Fumimaro Konoe; Hideki Tojo
- Preceded by: Prince Kan'in Kotohito
- Succeeded by: Hideki Tojo

Member of the Supreme War Council
- In office 12 September 1939 – 3 October 1940
- In office 3 June 1938 – 9 December 1938
- In office 1 August 1936 – 9 February 1937

Personal details
- Born: January 1, 1880 Kokura, Fukuoka, Japan
- Died: September 12, 1945 (aged 65) Tokyo, Japan
- Awards: Order of the Golden Kite, Order of the Rising Sun

Military service
- Allegiance: Empire of Japan
- Branch/service: Imperial Japanese Army
- Years of service: 1901–1945
- Rank: Field Marshal
- Commands: 12th Division; Northern China Area Army; First General Army
- Battles/wars: Russo-Japanese War; Second Sino-Japanese War; Bombing of Chongqing; World War II

Hajime Sugiyama (杉山 元, Sugiyama Hajime / Sugiyama Gen; 1 January 1880 – 12 September 1945) was a Japanese field marshal and one of Japan's military leaders for most of the Second World War.

As Army Minister, Sugiyama was a driving force behind Japan's 1937 invasion of China in retaliation for the Marco Polo Bridge Incident. After being named the Japanese Army's Chief of Staff in 1940, he became a leading advocate for expansion into Southeast Asia and preventive war against the United States.

Upon the outbreak of hostilities in the Asia-Pacific theater of World War II, Sugiyama served as the army's commander-in-chief until his removal by Prime Minister Hideki Tojo in February 1944. Following Tojo's ouster in July 1944, he once again held the post of Army Minister in Kuniaki Koiso's cabinet until its dissolution in April 1945. Ten days after Japan's surrender on 2 September 1945, he committed suicide.

== Early life and career ==
Born to a former samurai family from Kokura (now part of Kitakyushu City), Fukuoka Prefecture, Sugiyama graduated from the 12th class of the Imperial Japanese Army Academy in 1901. He served as a junior officer with 3rd Battalion of the 14th Regiment of the IJA 12th Division in the Russo-Japanese War, and was wounded in the face during the Battle of Shaho. Due to scars from that injury, he was unable to fully open his right eye.

After graduating from the 22nd class of the Army Staff College in 1910, Sugiyama served in Section 2 (Intelligence) within the Imperial Japanese Army General Staff. He was posted as military attaché to the Philippines and Singapore in 1912. There, disguised as as a Japanese Navy lieutenant, he joined in an inspection tour of the United States Navy base at Subic Bay. Promoted to major in 1913, he was posted again as military attaché to British India in 1915, where he met in secret with Indian independence activists Rash Behari Bose and Subhas Chandra Bose. In 1918, he was sent as a military observer to the Middle Eastern theatre of World War I. At the end of the war, he served on the League of Nations committee on military aviation.

On his return to Japan, Sugiyama was promoted to lieutenant colonel, and commander of the 2nd Air Battalion in December 1918. Three years later in 1921, he was promoted to colonel. A strong proponent of military aviation, he ultimately rose to become the first head of the Imperial Japanese Army Air Service in 1922.

== Rise to power ==
=== Involvement in Army politics ===
In 1924, Sugiyama became a protege of Army Minister Ugaki Kazushige. Subsequently, he was promoted to major general in May 1925 and appointed Director of the Bureau of Military Affairs in 1928. Within the same timeframe, he also became a leading figure in the Army's Control Faction, the Tōseiha.

In 1931, he participated in the March incident, a failed coup-d'etat which attempted to make Ugaki Prime Minister. Later that year, as Under Secretary of the Army, he made an official announcement defending the actions of the military in the Mukden Incident.

With the rise of the rival Kōdōha faction under Sadao Araki to the post of Army Minister, Sugiyama was sidelined to the Imperial Japanese Army Air Service in March 1933. However, the failed coup d'état of the February 26 incident in 1936 led to a purge of the Kōdōha from positions of authority and Sugiyama was promoted to full general in November 1936.

=== Army Minister ===
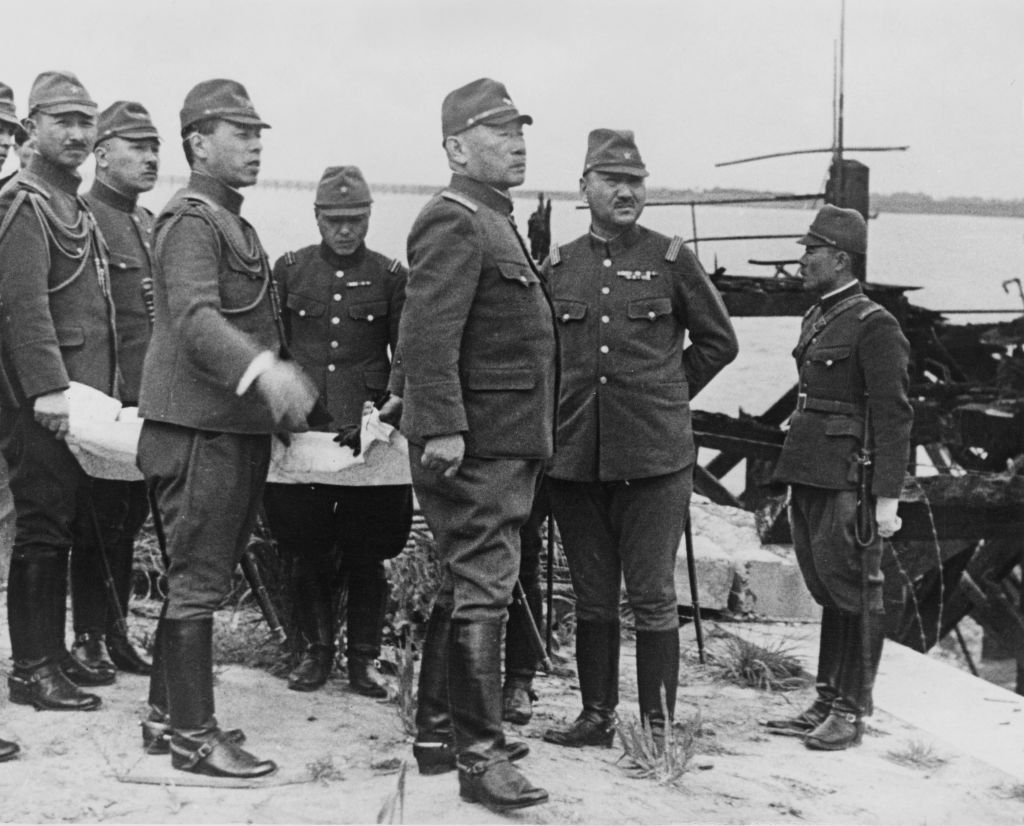
General Sugiyama (center) inspecting Japanese landing sites in Shanghai, 1938

In February 1937, General Sugiyama became Army Minister in the cabinet of Prime Minister Senjūrō Hayashi and remained in that position under the succeeding Prime Minister, Fumimaro Konoe. During his tenure, hostilities broke out between Japanese and Chinese forces near the Marco Polo Bridge on 7 July 1937. Thereafter, Sugiyama was among those pushing Konoe for armed retaliation. When summoned for an imperial audience regarding events in China, he assured the Emperor that a war against the Chinese could be successfully resolved within 2-3 months.

On July 11, Prime Minister Konoe authorized the reinforcement of Japanese troops in northern China. By the end of the month, Japan's military had seized Peking, thereby giving rise to the Second Sino-Japanese War.

=== Promotion to Army leadership ===
On 3 June 1938, Sugiyama left his position as Army Minister to become a member of Japan's Supreme War Council. In December 1938, he briefly left the council to assume command over the North China Area Army and the Mongolia Garrison Army respectively before returning in September 1939.

By 3 September 1940, Hajime Sugiyama succeeded the elderly Prince Kan'in Kotohito as Chief of the Imperial Japanese Army General Staff.

== Chief of the Army General Staff (1940–1944) ==
As Chief of the Army General Staff, General Sugiyama played a leading role in the deterioration of Japan-U.S. relations that ultimately resulted in the outbreak of war in the Pacific. In October 1940, he overruled plans to attack the Soviet Union and pushed for the adoption of a "Strike South" policy should negotiations with the Americans over Japan's rights in China and Southeast Asia fail. On 24 June 1941, the high commands of both the army and navy jointly agreed to push for the occupation of southern Indochina. Upon decoding a cable in July revealing Tokyo's plans to seize the remains of French Indochina, Washington responded by freezing all Japanese assets within the U.S., thereby denying Japan access to American oil. During negotiations to resolve the ensuing diplomatic crisis, Sugiyama and the army leadership blocked Prime Minister Konoe from making any concessions regarding the continued presence of Japanese troops in China or Japan's membership in the Tripartite Pact.

At a liaison conference held on 3 September 1941, Sugiyama and the Chief of the Navy General Staff, Admiral Osami Nagano, called for Japan to be committed to war if negotiations were not successfully concluded within the first 10 days of October. After being endorsed by those present, this proposal (formalized in a document entitled Essentials for Carrying Out the Empire's Policies) was presented to Emperor Hirohito for his approval.

On 5 September 1941, General Sugiyama and Admiral Nagano were called before the Emperor to brief him on the Essentials' proposed movement toward war. When Sugiyama reported to him that operations in the Pacific were expected to conclude in 3 months, the Emperor pointed out the general had previously assured him the war in China would be resolved within a similar timeframe and that conflict had yet to be settled after 4 years. Despite such concerns, the Emperor refrained from overruling the document's recommendations, which were adopted as national policy at the ensuing Imperial Conference on 6 September 1941. However, on October 17, the Emperor effectively overturned the results of the 6 September conference upon naming General Hideki Tojo as Prime Minister and explicitly charging him with the task of "mak[ing] an exhaustive study" of alternatives to conflict with the West.

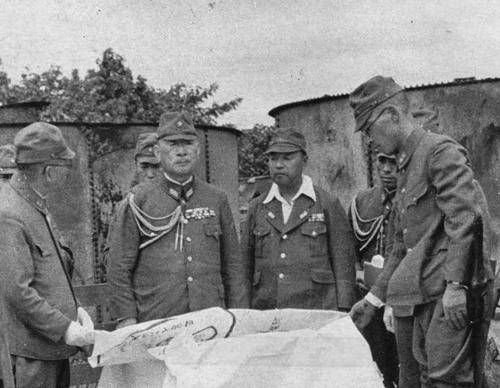
Sugiyama (second from left) meets with army officers at Java in 1942.

On 1 November 1941, members of the Japanese high command and the nation's government convened another liaison conference to deliberate whether to (1) avoid war even at the cost of the status quo, (2) immediately commit Japan to conflict with the U.S. and its allies, or (3) prepare for hostilities while simultaneously continuing negotiations with Washington. At the meeting, Sugiyama called for an immediate commitment to war and setting the beginning of hostilities for early December. Upon being met with significant opposition from Prime Minister Tojo and Foreign Minister Shigenori Tōgō, Sugiyama and the army leadership agreed to allow negotiations to proceed until December 1 before putting the country on a definitive war footing. By November 5, the Emperor ratified the consensus reached at that month's liaison conference.

On 1 December 1941, the Emperor ultimately gave his imperial sanction for the onset of hostilities against the U.S. and its Western allies. By virtue of his leadership of the Army General Staff, General Sugiyama oversaw all military operations carried out by the Japanese Army. In a matter of months, the Empire of Japan conquered a broad swathe of territory in Southeast Asia and the western Pacific including Malaya, the Dutch East Indies, Burma, and the Philippines. However, by the beginning of 1943, the tide of the conflict had turned against the Japanese after their forces were decisively defeated at the battles of Midway and Guadalcanal. In the same year, Sugiyama was awarded the honorary rank of field marshal.

As the war fronts collapsed on all sides, Sugiyama was relieved of his post as Chief of the Army General Staff on 21 February 1944 by Prime Minister Tōjō, who assumed command of the Army in his place. Thereafter, he was named Inspector-general of Military Training, which was still one of the most prestigious positions in the Army.

== Final years and death ==
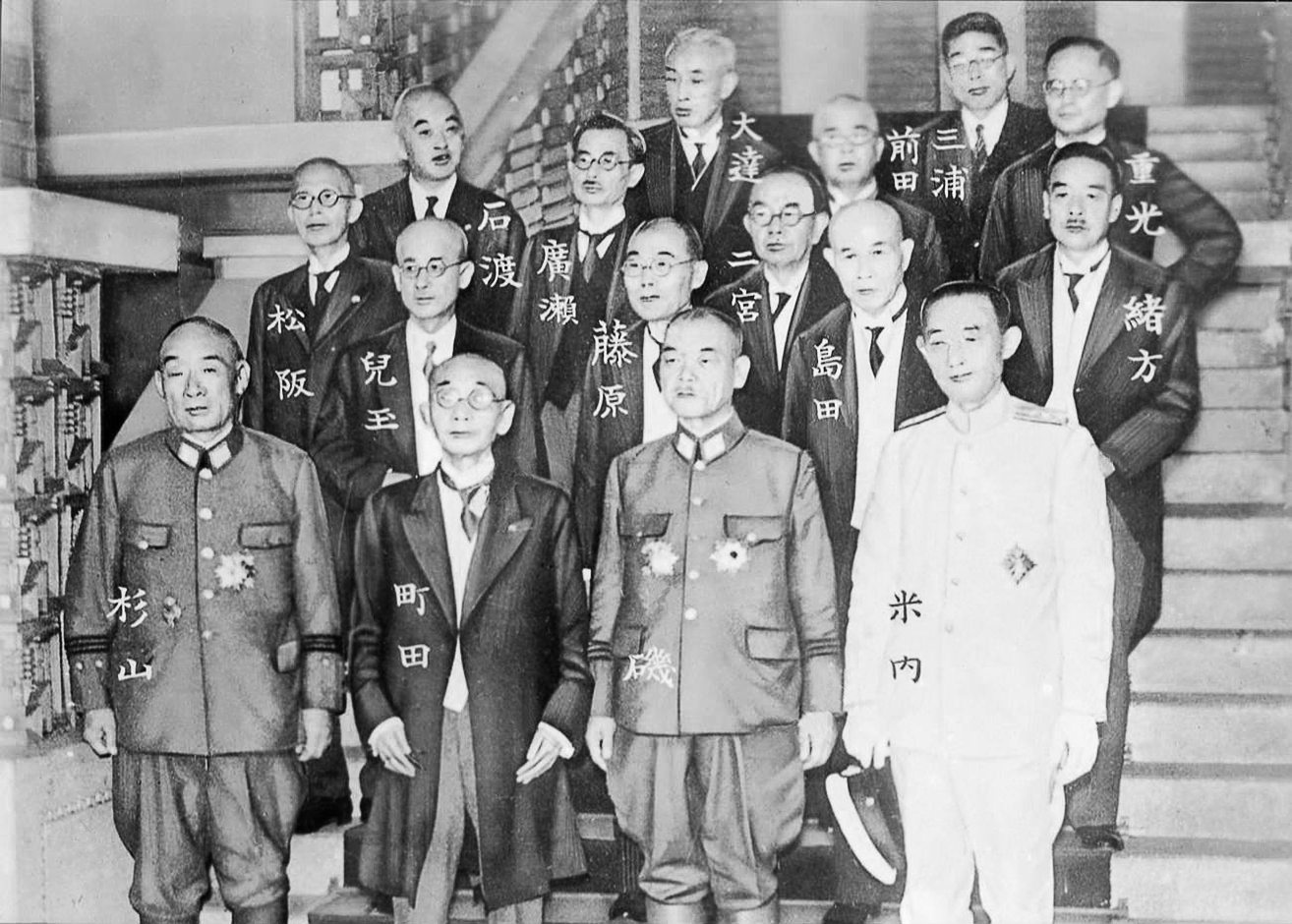
Sugiyama (left on first row), as Minister of War in Kuniaki Koiso's cabinet (July 1944).

After Tōjō's ouster in 1944, Sugiyama again became Army Minister in the new cabinet of Prime Minister Kuniaki Koiso. In July 1945, he was asked to take command of the First General Army, which directed defenses of eastern half Japanese mainland against the anticipated Allied invasion.

Ten days after the surrender of Japan, after finishing preparations for the final dissolution of the Imperial Japanese Army as dictated by the victorious Allied Powers, Sugiyama committed suicide by shooting himself four times in the chest with his revolver while seated at his desk in his office. At home, his wife also killed herself. His grave is at the Tama Cemetery, in Fuchū, Tokyo.

Political offices
Preceded by Kōtarō Nakamura	Minister of the Army; Feb 1937 – June 1938	Succeeded by Seishirō Itagaki
Preceded by Tōjō Hideki	Minister of the Army; Jul 1944 – Apr 1945	Succeeded by Anami Korechika
Military offices
Preceded by none	Commander IJA 1st General Army; Apr 1945 – Sept 1945	Succeeded by Kenji Doihara
Preceded by Otozō Yamada	Inspector-General of Military Training; Jul 1944 – Nov 1944	Succeeded by Shunroku Hata
Preceded by Prince Kan'in Kotohito	Chief of Imperial Japanese Army General Staff; Oct 1940 – Feb 1944	Succeeded by Tōjō Hideki
Preceded by Shigeru Hasunuma	Commander Mongolia Garrison Army; Aug 1939 – Sept 1939	Succeeded by Naozaburo Okabe
Preceded by Hisaichi Terauchi	Commander North China Area Army; Dec 1938 – Aug 1939	Succeeded by Hayao Tada
Preceded by Yoshikazu Nishi	Inspector-General of Military Training; Aug 1936 – Feb 1937	Succeeded by Hisaichi Terauchi
