= Fifty-Ninth Army (Japan) =

Japanese Fifty-Ninth Army
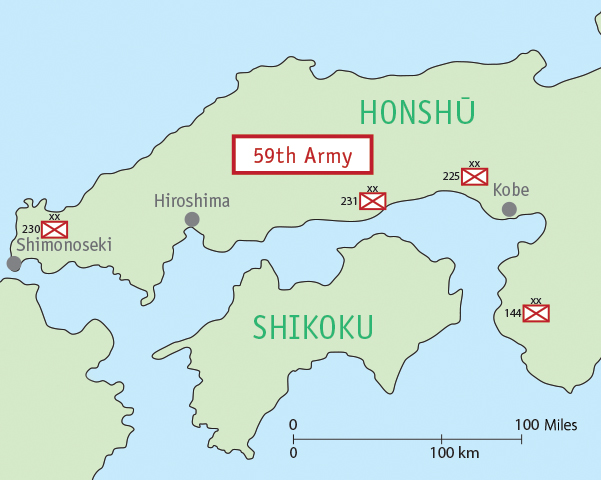
- Active: June 15, 1945 – August 15, 1945
- Country: Empire of Japan
- Branch: Imperial Japanese Army
- Type: Infantry
- Role: Corps
- Nickname(s): 山陽 (San'yo, after San'yo region)
- Engagements: Operation Downfall

The Japanese 59th Army (第59軍, Dai-gojyūku gun) was an army of the Imperial Japanese Army during the final days of World War II.

== History ==
The Japanese 59th Army was formed on June 15, 1945, under the Japanese 15th Area Army as part of the last desperate defense effort by the Empire of Japan to deter possible landings of Allied forces in the San'yo region of western Honshū during Operation Downfall. The Japanese 59th Army consisted mostly of poorly trained reservists, conscripted students and home guard militia. Headquartered in Hiroshima, most of its command staff, including its commander Lieutenant General Yoji Fujii, were killed during the atomic bombing of Hiroshima. Together with the 2nd General Army, Fifth Division, and other combat divisions in the city who were also hit, an estimated 20,000 Japanese combatants were killed. Remnants of the 59th Army attempted to perform relief work and maintain public order in the devastated city with little success. The IJA 59th Army was officially demobilized after the surrender of Japan on August 15, 1945.

== List of Commanders ==
=== Commanding officer ===
	Name	From	To
1	Lieutenant General Yoji Fujii	15 June 1945	6 August 1945
2	Lieutenant General Teiki Nakanishi	6 August 1945	12 August 1945
3	Lieutenant General Jitsuo Tani	12 August 1945	15 August 1945

=== Chief of Staff ===
	Name	From	To
1	Major General Takeo Kaji	15 June 1945	5 July 1945
2	Major General Shuitsu Matsumara	5 July 1945	18 September 1945
3	Lieutenant General Saburo Kawamura	18 August 1945	30 November 1945
