= Shunroku Hata =

Japanese military officer and war criminal (1879–1962)

- 畑 俊六
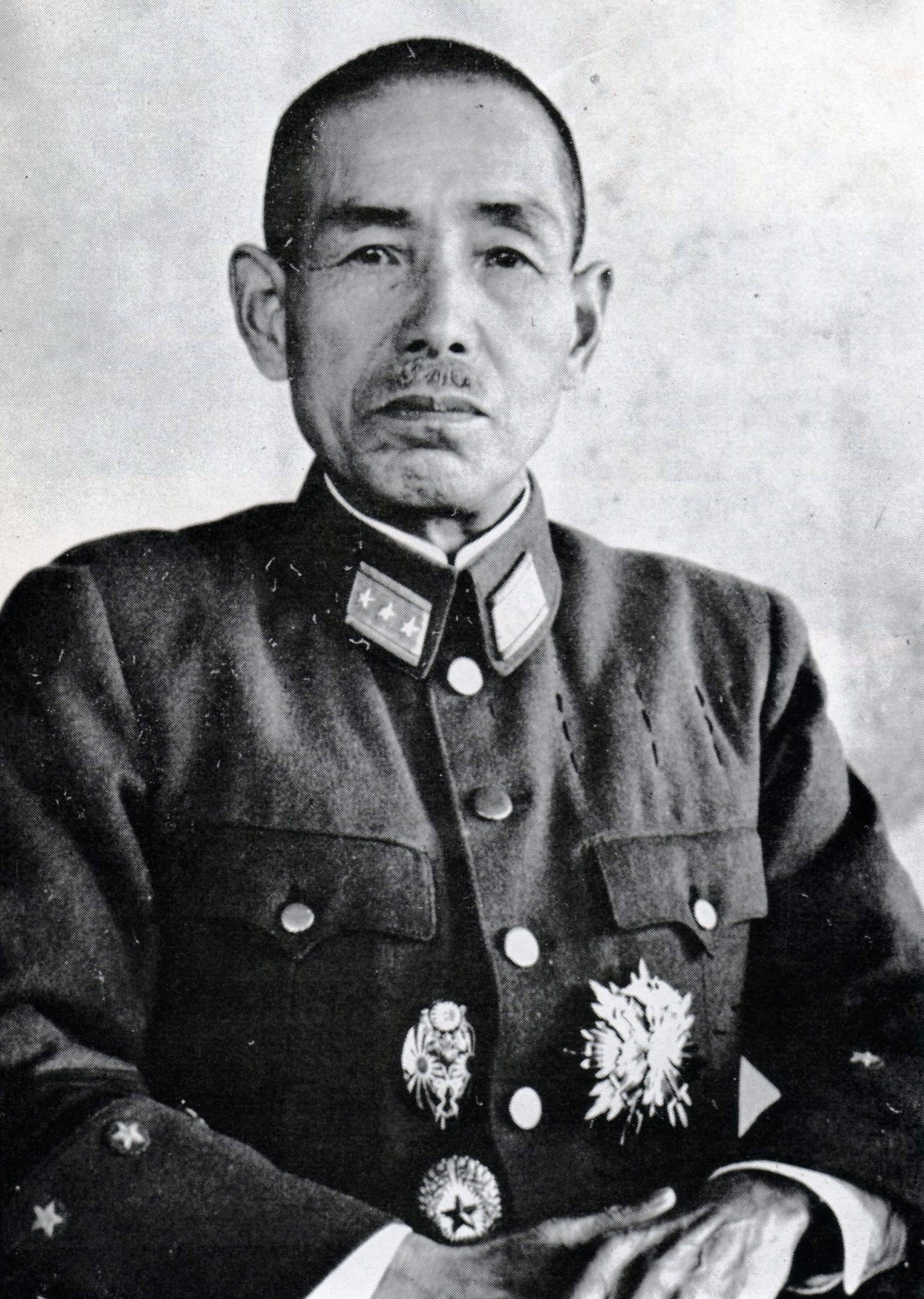
- Field Marshal Shunroku Hata serving at Second General Army

Inspector-General of Military Training
- In office November 23, 1944 – April 7, 1945
- Monarch: Hirohito
- Preceded by: Hajime Sugiyama
- Succeeded by: Kenji Doihara
- In office August 26, 1937 – February 14, 1938
- Monarch: Hirohito
- Preceded by: Hisaichi Terauchi
- Succeeded by: Rikichi Andō

Minister of the Army
- In office August 30, 1939 – July 22, 1940
- Prime Minister: Nobuyuki Abe; Mitsumasa Yonai
- Preceded by: Seishirō Itagaki
- Succeeded by: Hideki Tōjō

Member of the Supreme War Council
- In office July 22, 1940 – March 1, 1941
- Monarch: Hirohito
- In office December 15, 1938 – May 25, 1939
- Monarch: Hirohito
- In office August 2, 1937 – February 14, 1938
- Monarch: Hirohito

Personal details
- Born: July 26, 1879 Fukushima Prefecture, Japan
- Died: May 10, 1962 (aged 82) Tokyo, Japan
- Awards: Order of the Rising Sun First Class; Order of the Golden Kite First Class; Order of the Sacred Treasure First Class

Military service
- Allegiance: Empire of Japan
- Branch/service: Imperial Japanese Army
- Years of service: 1901–1945
- Rank: Field Marshal
- Unit: Third Army (Japan)
- Commands: 14th Division; Taiwan Army of Japan; China Expeditionary Army; Second General Army (Japan)
- Battles/wars: Russo-Japanese War; World War I; Second Sino-Japanese War; Battle of Xuzhou; Battle of Wuhan; Battle of Taierzhuang; Zhejiang-Jiangxi campaign; Operation Ichi-Go; World War II; Atomic bombing of Hiroshima

Shunroku Hata (畑 俊六, Hata Shunroku; July 26, 1879 – May 10, 1962) was a field marshal (gensui) in the Imperial Japanese Army who served as Minister of the Army from 1939 to 1940. He was the last surviving Japanese military officer with a marshal's rank. In the aftermath of World War II Hata was convicted of war crimes and sentenced to life imprisonment in 1948, but was paroled in 1955.

== Early life ==
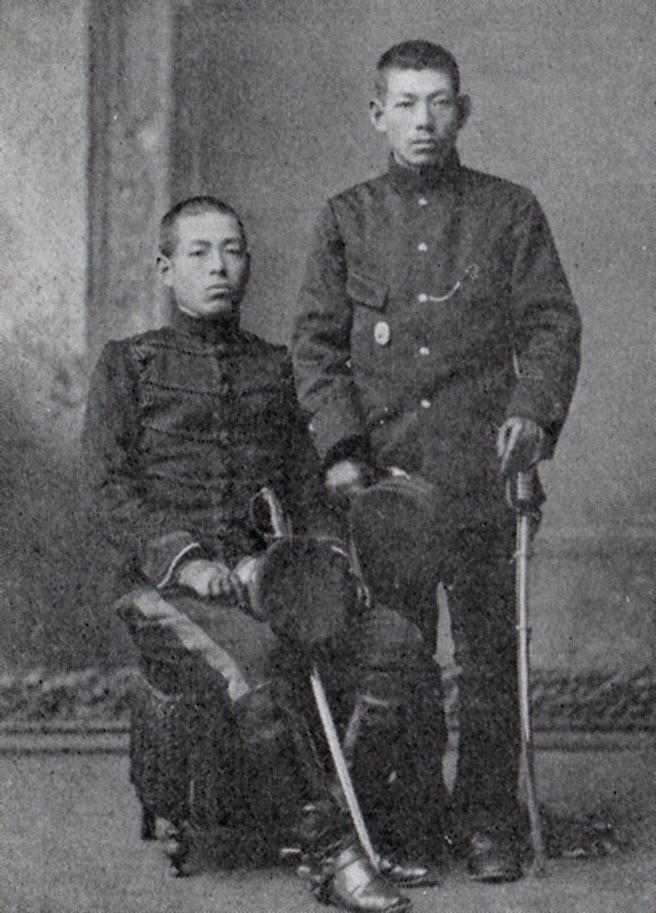
Hata (on the left) with his brother before the Russo-Japanese War

Hata was a native of Fukushima Prefecture, where his father was a samurai of the Aizu Domain. At the age of 12, the family relocated to Hakodate, Hokkaidō, but at the age of 14, he was accepted into the prestigious First Tokyo Middle School. However, his father died the same year. Unable to afford the tuition, Hata enrolled in the Army Cadet School instead, going on to graduate in the 12th class of the Imperial Japanese Army Academy in 1901 as a second lieutenant in the artillery. Hata served in the Russo-Japanese War. He graduated from the 22nd class of the Army Staff College with top rankings in November 1910.

Sent as a military attaché to Germany in March 1912, Hata stayed in Europe throughout World War I as a military observer. He was promoted to major in September 1914 and to lieutenant colonel in July 1918, while still in Europe, and he stayed on as a member of the Japanese delegation to the Versailles Peace Treaty negotiations in February 1919.

On his return to Japan, Hata was promoted to colonel and given command of the 16th Field Artillery Regiment in July 1921, and was promoted to major general and commander of the 4th Heavy Field Artillery Brigade in March 1926.

Hata was subsequently assigned to the strategic planning division of the Imperial Japanese Army General Staff, serving as chief of the Fourth Bureau in July 1927 and Chief of the First Bureau in August 1928.

Hata was promoted to lieutenant general in August 1931 and became Inspector General of Artillery Training. He was then given a field command, that of the 14th Division in August 1933. After serving as head of the Imperial Japanese Army Air Service from December 1935, he became commander of the Taiwan Army of Japan in 1936.

== Second Sino-Japanese War and World War II ==
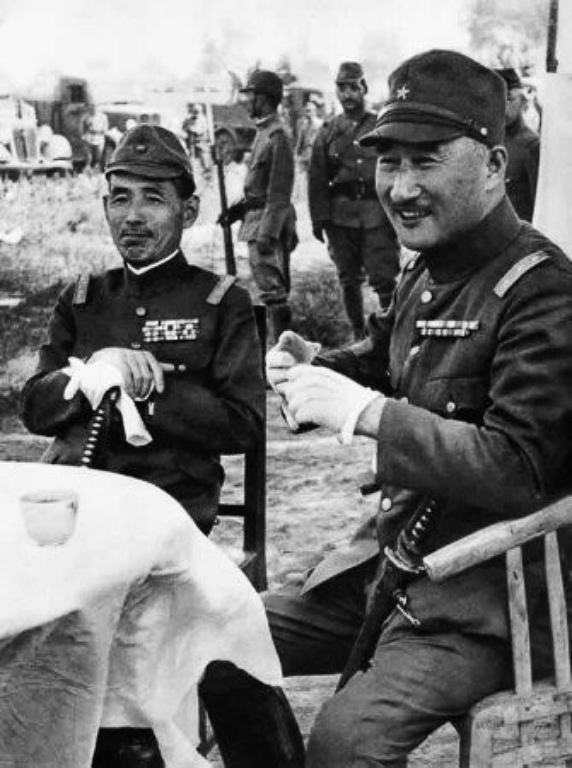
Hata (left) with Field Marshal Terauchi Hisaichi in Xuzhou

His rise after the start of the Second Sino-Japanese War was then very rapid: Military Councilor, Inspector General of Military Training and promotion rank of general all in late 1937. He was appointed as commanding general of the Central China Expeditionary Army in February 1938, to replace General Matsui Iwane, who had been recalled to Japan over the Nanjing Massacre. Hata became Senior Aide-de-Camp to Emperor Shōwa in May 1939 followed by a stint as Minister of War from August 1939 to July 1940 during the terms of Prime Minister Nobuyuki Abe and Mitsumasa Yonai. In July 1940, Hata had a pivotal role in bringing down the Yonai cabinet by resigning his post as Minister of War.

Hata returned to China as commander-in-chief of the China Expeditionary Army in March 1941. He was the main Japanese commander at the time of Zhejiang-Jiangxi Campaign, during which Chinese sources claim that over 250,000 civilians were killed. Hata was promoted to the rank of Field Marshal (Gensui) on June 2, 1944 following Japanese victory at Operation Ichi-Go.

Hata was requested to take command of the Second General Army, based in Hiroshima from 1944 to 1945 in preparation for the anticipated Allied invasion of the Japanese home islands. He was thus in Hiroshima at the time of the atomic bombing and survived. One of the only senior figures to survive the explosion, Hata took command of the city and relief efforts in the following days. Hata was one of the senior generals who agreed with the decision to surrender, but asked that he be stripped of his title of Field Marshal in atonement for the Army's failures in the war.

=== Promotions ===
- Second Lieutenant: June 1901
- Lieutenant: November 1903
- Captain: June 1905
- Major: April 1914
- Lieutenant Colonel: July 1918
- Colonel: July 20, 1921
- Major General: March 2, 1926
- Lieutenant General: August 1, 1931
- General: November 1, 1937
- Marshal: June 2, 1944

== Arrest and conviction ==
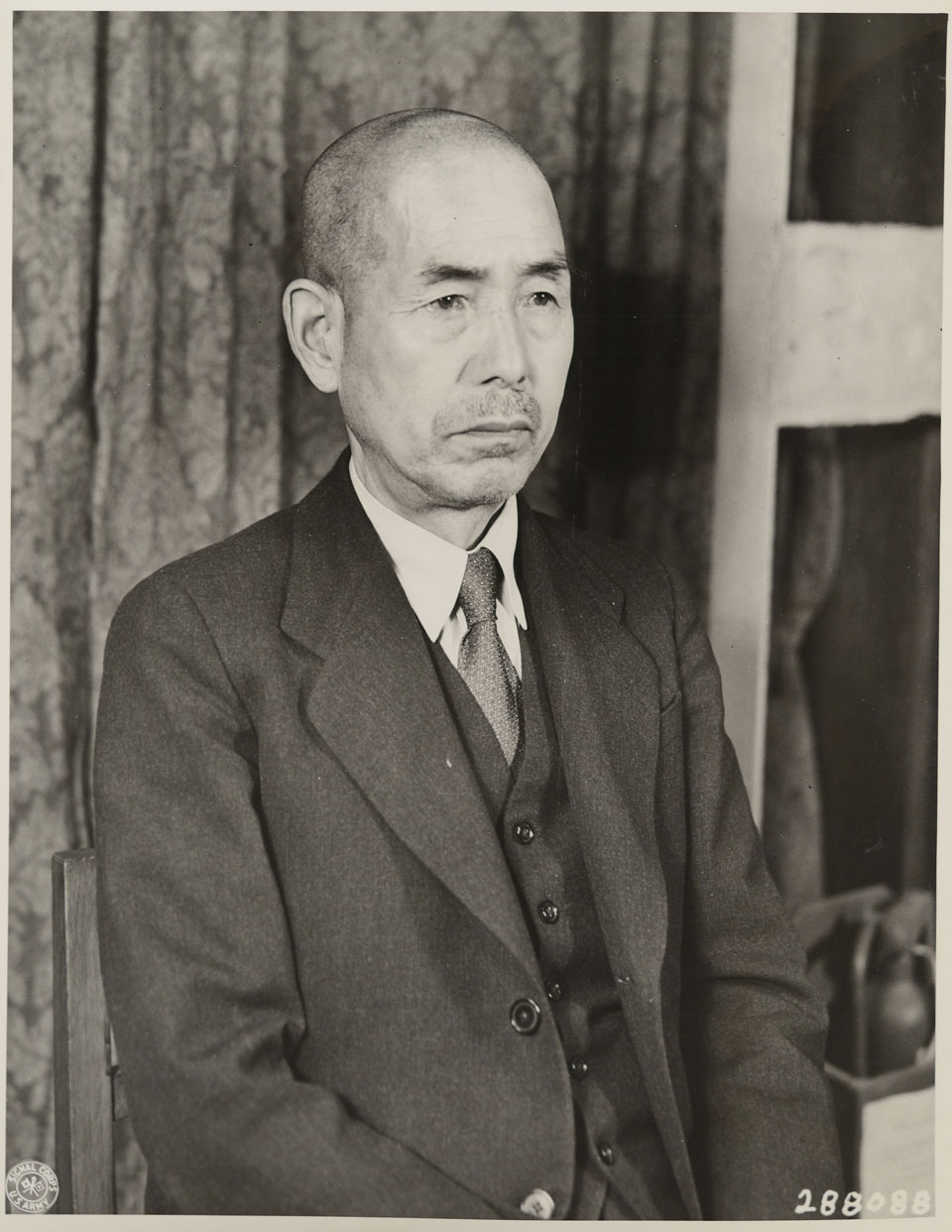
Hata during his trial

Hata was arrested by the American occupation authorities after the end of the war, and charged with war crimes. He was the only surviving Japanese Field Marshal who faced criminal charges along with other defendants. In 1948, as a result of the International Military Tribunal for the Far East, he was sentenced to life imprisonment under the charges of: “Conspiracy, waging aggressive war, disregarding his duty to prevent atrocities”. Hata was paroled in 1955, and headed a charitable foundation for the welfare of former soldiers from 1958. He died in 1962, while attending a ceremony honouring the war dead.

Hata's older brother, Eitaro Hata (1872–1930), was also a general in the Imperial Japanese Army, and commander-in-chief of the Kwantung Army, from July 1929 until his death, in May 1930, from acute nephritis.

Political offices
| Preceded by Seishirō Itagaki | Army Minister; Aug 1939 – Jul 1940 | Succeeded by Hideki Tōjō |
Military offices
| Preceded by Naosuke Matsuki | Commander, 14th Division; August 1933 – Dec 1935 | Succeeded by Shigeharu Suematsu |
| Preceded by Heisuke Yanagawa | Commander, IJA Taiwan Army; Aug 1936 – Aug 1937 | Succeeded by Mikio Tsutsumi |
| Preceded by Hisaichi Terauchi | Inspector-General of Military Training; Aug 1937 – Feb 1938 | Succeeded by Rikichi Andō |
| Preceded by none | Commander, Central China Expeditionary Army; Feb 1938 – Dec 1938 | Succeeded by Otozō Yamada |
| Preceded by Toshizō Nishio | Commander-in-Chief, China Expeditionary Army; March 1941 - November 1944 | Succeeded by Yasuji Okamura |
| Preceded by none | Commander-in-Chief, IJA 2nd General Army; Apr 1945 – Oct 1945 | Succeeded by none |
