= General Defense Command =

Military command

- Japanese: 防衛総司令部; Bōei Soshireibu
- Active: July 5, 1941 – April 8, 1945
- Country: Empire of Japan
- Allegiance: Emperor of Japan
- Branch: Imperial Japanese Army
- Type: General Army
- Garrison/HQ: Tokyo

The General Defense Command (防衛総司令部, Bōei Soshireibu) was a headquarters organization and general army of the Imperial Japanese Army, established to control all land and air units stationed within Japan proper, Korea and Taiwan during World War II.

== History ==
The General Defense Command was established on July 5, 1941 under the direct command of the Emperor via the Imperial General Headquarters. For administrative, recruiting and accounting purposes, Japan was divided into six army districts, each with a garrison force equivalent to an army corps:

- Eastern District Army – HQ in Tokyo and responsible for the Kantō region and northern Honshū
- Western District Army – HQ in Fukuoka and responsible for southwestern Honshū, Shikoku and the Ryukyu Islands.
- Northern District Army – HQ in Sapporo and responsible for Hokkaidō and Karafuto.
- Central District Army – HQ in Osaka and responsible for central Honshū.
- Chosen Army – HQ in Keijo and responsible for Korea
- Taiwan Army – HQ in Taihoku and responsible for Taiwan.

The General Defense Command was also responsible for anti-aircraft defenses, and for organizing civil defense training.

On April 8, 1945, in preparation for Operation Downfall (or Operation Ketsugō (決号作戦, Ketsugō sakusen) in Japanese terminology), the General Defense Command was dissolved, and its duties assumed by the new First General Army and Second General Army.

== List of Commanders ==
=== Commanding officer ===
	Name	From	To
1	General Otozō Yamada	7 July 1941	9 December 1941
2	General Prince Higashikuni Naruhiko	9 December 1941	15 April 1945

=== Chief of Staff ===
	Name	From	To
1	Lieutenant General Torashirō Kawabe	31 July 1941	1 December 1941
2	Lieutenant General Asasaburo Kobayashi	1 December 1941	10 June 1943
3	Lieutenant General Tadayoshi Sano	10 June 1943	29 March 1944
4	Lieutenant General Asasaburo Kobayashi	28 March 1944	1 February 1945
5	Lieutenant General Einosuke Sudo	1 February 1945	6 April 1945

== See also ==
- Armies of the Imperial Japanese Army
