= Air General Army =

- Japanese: 航空総軍; Kōkū Sōgun
- Active: 8 April 1945
- Country: Empire of Japan
- Allegiance: Emperor of Japan
- Branch: Imperial Japanese Army
- Type: General Army
- Role: Air defense
- Engagements: Air raids on Japan

Commanders
- Notable commanders: Masakazu Kawabe

The Air General Army (航空総軍, Kōkū Sōgun) also known as the Supreme Army Airforce was a Japanese general army responsible for the defense of the country against Allied air raids during the last months of World War II. The Air General Army was formed in April 1945 to better coordinate Japan's air defenses in response to the mounting air offensive against Japan and the expected invasion of the country later that year. The army was disbanded following the end of the war.

== See also ==
- Armies of the Imperial Japanese Army
