= Taiwan Army of Japan =

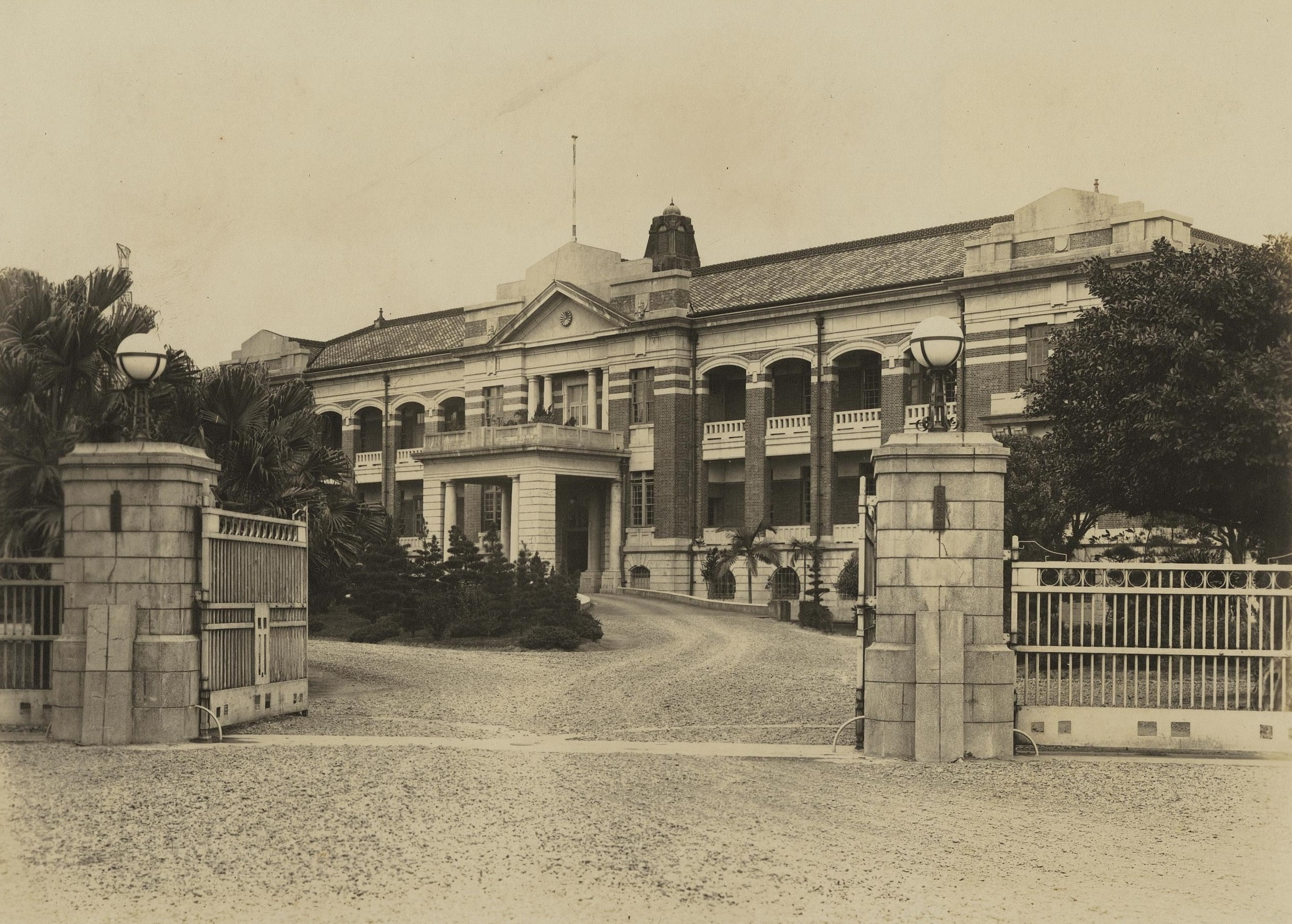
- Taiwan Army of Japan HQ, Taihoku
- Active: August 20, 1919 - September 22, 1944
- Country: Empire of Japan
- Branch: Imperial Japanese Army
- Type: Infantry
- Role: Corps
- Garrison/HQ: Taihoku

The Taiwan Army of Japan (台湾軍, Taiwan gun) was an army of the Imperial Japanese Army stationed on the island of Taiwan as a garrison force.

== History ==
Following the First Sino-Japanese War, the Treaty of Shimonoseki transferred control of Taiwan from the Qing Empire to the Empire of Japan. The Japanese government established the Governor-General of Taiwan based in Taihoku. The Governor-General of Taiwan was given control of local military forces on 20 August 1919, which formed the nucleus of the Taiwan Army of Japan.

Primarily a garrison force, the Japanese Taiwan Army was placed under control of the Shanghai Expeditionary Army at the start of the Second Sino-Japanese War in 1937. A component of the Taiwan Army, the Taiwan Independent Combined Brigade, was active in numerous campaigns on the China, and was later expanded into the 48th Infantry Division. Troops from this army were also involved in the Nanjing Massacre in December 1937.

Taiwanese natives were only assigned to non-combatant civilian work as manual labourers, porters and Chinese language interpreters. Taiwanese were not allowed as combatants until 1942 when volunteers were permitted to enlist and all combatant soldiers from the Taiwan Army of Japan before 1942 were ethnic Japanese. Native Taiwanese were briefly conscripted in 1945.

Towards the end of World War II, as the situation looked increasingly desperate for Japan, the Taiwan Army was merged with several other units garrisoning the island of Taiwan against possible Allied invasion, and the Taiwan Army was absorbed into the new Japanese Tenth Area Army on 22 September 1944, under which it formed the Taiwan District Army on 1 February 1945, but its command was directly by the Japanese 10th Area Army.

== List of commanders ==
=== Commanding officers ===
	Name	From	To
1	General Motojiro Akashi	20 August 1919	26 October 1919
2	General Goro Shiba	1 December 1919	4 May 1921
3	Lieutenant General Masatarō Fukuda	4 May 1921	6 August 1923
4	General Soroku Suzuki	6 August 1923	20 August 1924
5	Lieutenant General Takaichi Kanno	20 August 1924	28 July 1926
6	Lieutenant General Kunishige Tanaka	28 July 1926	10 August 1928
7	General Takashi Hishikari	10 August 1928	3 June 1930
8	General Jotaro Watanabe	3 June 1930	1 August 1931
9	Lieutenant General Jinzaburō Masaki	1 August 1931	9 January 1932
10	General Nobuyuki Abe	9 January 1932	1 August 1933
11	General Iwane Matsui	1 August 1933	1 August 1934
12	Field Marshal Count Hisaichi Terauchi	1 August 1934	2 December 1935
13	Lieutenant General Heisuke Yanagawa	2 December 1935	1 August 1936
14	Field Marshal Shunroku Hata	1 August 1936	2 August 1937
15	Lieutenant General Mikio Tsutsumi	2 August 1937	8 September 1938
16	Lieutenant General Tomou Kodama	8 September 1938	1 December 1939
17	Lieutenant General Mitsuru Ushijima	1 December 1939	2 December 1940
18	Lieutenant General Masaharu Homma	2 December 1940	6 November 1941
19	General Rikichi Ando	6 November 1941	17 September 1945

=== Chief of staff ===
	Name	From	To
1	Major General Koichiro Soda	20 August 1919	25 February 1921
2	Major General Kojiro Satoi	25 February 1921	4 February 1924
3	Major General Kinzo Watanabe	4 February 1924	26 July 1927
4	Major General Nenosuke Sato	26 July 1927	24 April 1930
5	Major General Takeshi Kosugi	24 April 1930	11 April 1932
6	Major General Yoshishige Shimizu	11 April 1932	18 March 1933
7	Major General Kennosuke Otsuka	18 March 1933	22 January 1934
8	Major General Sumei Kuwaki	22 January 1934	1 August 1935
9	Lieutenant General Ryuhei Ogisu	1 August 1935	1 March 1937
10	Major General Masataka Hata	1 March 1937	19 February 1938
11	Lieutenant General Hisaichi Tanaka	19 February 1938	8 September 1938
12	Major General Kazuo Otsu	15 October 1938	9 March 1940
13	Lieutenant General Mikio Uemura	9 March 1940	1 March 1941
14	Lieutenant General Takaji Wachi	1 March 1941	20 February 1942
15	Lieutenant General Shichiro Higuchi	20 February 1942	29 October 1943
16	Lieutenant General Shinpachi Kondo	29 October 1943	8 July 1944
17	Lieutenant General Haruki Isayama	8 July 1944	17 September 1945

== See also ==
- Armies of the Imperial Japanese Army
- Ethnic Taiwanese Imperial Japan Serviceman
- Japanese Korean Army
- Takasago Volunteers
