= Japanese North China Area Army =

1937–1945 Imperial Japanese Army formation

Japanese Northern China Area Army
- Active: August 21, 1937 – August 15, 1945
- Country: Empire of Japan
- Allegiance: Emperor of Japan
- Branch: Imperial Japanese Army
- Type: Area Army
- Garrison/HQ: Beijing
- Engagements: Second Sino-Japanese War

The Japanese North China Area Army (北支那方面軍, Kita Shina hōmen gun) was an area army of the Imperial Japanese Army during the Second Sino-Japanese War.

== History ==
The Japanese North China Area Army was formed on August 21, 1937 under the control of the Imperial General Headquarters. It was transferred to the newly formed China Expeditionary Army on September 23, 1939. Headquartered in Beijing, it was responsible for direction and coordination of the Japanese military activity in all of north China. It was demobilized in Beijing at the surrender of Japan.

== List of Commanders ==
=== Commanding officers ===
	Name	From	To
1	General Hisaichi Terauchi	26 August 1937	9 December 1938
2	General Hajime Sugiyama	9 December 1938	12 September 1939
3	Lieutenant General Hayao Tada	12 September 1939	7 July 1941
4	General Yasuji Okamura	7 July 1941	25 August 1944
5	General Naozaburo Okabe	25 August 1944	22 November 1944
6	General Sadamu Shimomura	22 November 1944	15 August 1945

=== Chiefs of Staff ===
	Name	From	To
1	Major General Naozaburo Okabe	26 August 1937	15 July 1938
2	Major General Tomoyuki Yamashita	15 July 1938	23 September 1939
3	Major General Yukio Kasahara	23 September 1939	1 March 1941
4	Lieutenant General Moritake Tanabe	1 March 1941	6 November 1941
5	Lieutenant General Hatazō Adachi	6 November 1941	9 November 1942
6	Lieutenant General Sanji Okido	9 November 1942	14 October 1944
7	Major General Gaku Takahashi	14 November 1944	15 August 1945
