= Southern Expeditionary Army Group =

Part of the Imperial Japanese Army during World War II

- Japanese: 南方軍; Nanpō gun
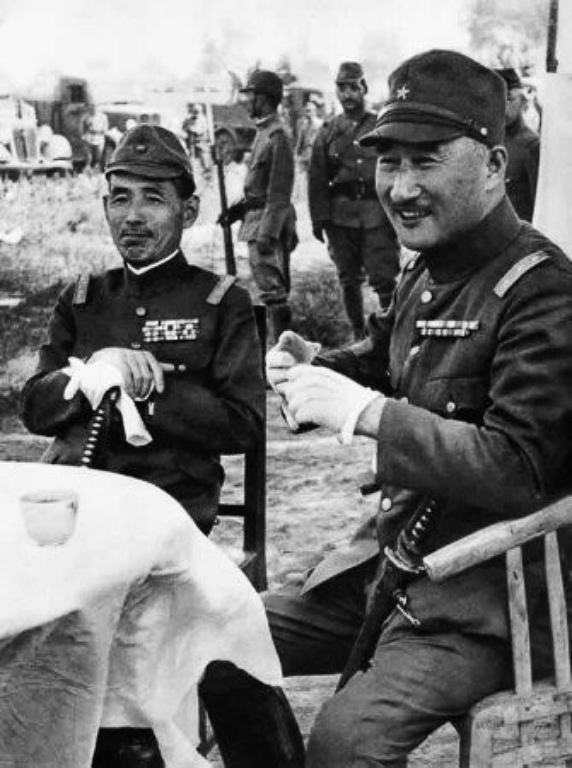
- Japanese General Count Terauchi Hisaichi, right, commanding officer of the Southern Expeditionary Army Group.
- Active: November 6, 1941 – September 2, 1945
- Country: Empire of Japan
- Allegiance: Emperor of Japan
- Branch: Imperial Japanese Army
- Type: General Army
- Size: 1,000,000 personnel
- Garrison/HQ: Saigon
- Engagements: Pacific War

The Southern Expeditionary Army Group (南方軍, Nanpō gun) was a general army of the Imperial Japanese Army during World War II. It was responsible for all military operations in the South East Asian and South West Pacific campaigns of World War II. Its military symbol was NA.

The Southern Expeditionary Army Group was formed on November 6, 1941, under the command of Gensui Count Terauchi Hisaichi, with orders to attack and occupy Allied territories and colonies in South East Asia and the South Pacific.

== Operational history ==
=== Philippines ===
Plans for an invasion of the Philippines were finalized on November 13–15, by Lt General Masaharu Homma, Lt General Hideyoshi Obata, Vice Admiral Ibō Takahashi and Vice Admiral Nishizo Tsukahara.

These plans called for air attacks against the Philippines, beginning on X-Day, by the 5th Army Air Force Division and the 11th Naval Air Fleet. At this time, Imperial Japanese Army and Imperial Japanese Navy units were to land on Batan Island, Luzon (at Aparri, Cagayan, Vigan, and Legazpi City), and at Davao, Mindanao, and to seize airfields. Following the elimination of American air support, the main body of the IJA 14th Army was to land at Lingayen Gulf, while another force landed at Lamon Bay. These forces were then to attack Manila in a pincer attack. After this, the islands of Manila Bay were to be taken. In the resulting Battle of the Philippines (1942), Japanese forces accomplished their primary objectives.

=== French Indochina ===
On July 22, 1941, Japanese forces, called Indochina Expeditionary Army invaded Vichy French Indochina and occupied its naval and air bases.

=== Dutch East Indies ===
On January 18, 1942, the commander of 16th Army Lt. General Hitoshi Imamura arrived at Takao, Taiwan from his base at Saigon. He received an order to hasten the invasion preparation toward Java. But due to shipping shortages, he had to adjust the plans. On January 21, he arrived at Manila to inspect the Imperial Japanese Army 48th Division and to have discussion with the commander of the Imperial Japanese Navy 3rd Fleet. The Netherlands East Indies was invaded in a three-prong attack by using 3 groups: western, center and eastern group.

==== Western invasion group ====
The IJA 2nd Division of the IJA 16th Army, which was assembled in Taiwan, was ordered on January 25 to move in to Cam Ranh Bay and became the main force of western invasion group. At Cam Ranh Bay, the troops were trained for the tropical jungle warfare. On the 30th, the attack order was announced. The western group was carried aboard 56 transport ships and left for Java on February 18. By midnight on February 28, the ships landed at Merak and Bantam Bay on Java island.

Following the surrender of Hong Kong, the 228th, 229th and 230th Infantry Regiments from the IJA 38th Division were also deployed to Netherlands East Indies separately. On February 13, the 229th and 230th assaulted Palembang on Sumatra and then joined the main force. On February 28 midnight the 230th Infantry Regiment landed on Eretan Wetan on Java.

==== Center invasion group ====
The center group was composed of IJA 48th Division, left for Java on February 8, 1942 from Lingayen Gulf, in the Philippines. On February 25, the convoy arrived at Balikpapan and the Sakaguchi detachment (56th Regiment Group) joined the force. They landed at Kragan on Java by midnight February 28.

Earlier on January 11, the Sakaguchi detachment and 2nd Kure Special Naval Landing Force occupied Tarakan. They secured Balikpapan on January 23. On 10 February Bandjermasin, the capital of Dutch Borneo was occupied.

==== Eastern invasion group ====
The Eastern invasion group included the Sasebo Combined Naval Landing Force and 1st Yokosuka Special Naval Landing Force. They left Davao on January 9 and during the early morning of January 11, arrived at and occupied Menado. The Sasebo Combined Special Naval Landing Force then attacked and occupied Kendari on January 23. Makassar was captured on 9 February by the Sasebo Combined Special Naval Landing Force. All these are on Celebes island.

The 1st Kure Special Naval Landing Force and 228th Infantry Regiment from 38th Army and Airplane Carrier Division 2 from Japan, reached Ambon on January 30.

== List of commanders ==
=== Commanding Officer ===
	Name	From	To
1	Gensui Count Terauchi Hisaichi	6 November 1941	31 August 1945

=== Chief of Staff ===
	Name	From	To
1	Lieutenant General Osamu Tsukada	6 November 1941	1 July 1942
2	Lieutenant General Kuroda Shigenori	1 July 1942	19 May 1943
3	Lieutenant General Shimizu Kinori	19 May 1943	22 March 1944
4	Lieutenant General Iimura Jo	22 March 1944	26 December 1944
5	Lieutenant General Numata Takazo	26 December 1944	September 1945

== See also ==
- Armies of the Imperial Japanese Army
