= Supreme War Council (Japan) =

Meiji-era de facto cabinet of Japan

The Supreme War Council (軍事参議院, Gunji sangiin) was an advisory body to the Emperor of Japan on military matters, established in 1903 and abolished in 1945. The council was created during the development of representative government in Meiji-era Japan to further strengthen the authority of the state. Its first leader was Yamagata Aritomo (1838–1922), who is credited as founder of the modern Imperial Japanese Army and was the first constitutional Prime Minister of Japan.

The Supreme War Council developed a German-style general staff system, with a chief of staff who had direct access to the Emperor and who could operate independently of the army minister and civilian officials. The Supreme War Council was the de facto inner cabinet of Japan prior to the Second Sino-Japanese War.

Towards the end of the second World War, on August 9–10, 1945 the six members of the Supreme War Council were:

- Prime Minister, Kantarō Suzuki.
- Foreign Minister, Shigenori Tōgō.
- Navy Minister, Admiral Mitsumasa Yonai.
- Army Minister, Korechika Anami.
- Chief of the Army General Staff, Yoshijirō Umezu.
- Chief of the Navy General Staff, Soemu Toyoda.

== Liaison Conference ==
From November 1937 onward, following Emperor Shōwa's order, the Gunji sangikan kaigi was in effect replaced by the Imperial General Headquarters-Government Liaison Conference (大本営政府連絡会議 Daihon'ei seifu renraku kaigi). The Liaison Conferences were intended by the Emperor to bring the chiefs of the Army and Navy General Staff into closer consultation with his government, and to assist in integrating the decisions and needs of the two military sections of Imperial General Headquarters with the resources and policies of the rest of the government. The final decisions of Liaison Conferences were formally disclosed and approved at Imperial Conferences over which the Emperor presided in person at the Kyūden of the Tokyo Imperial Palace.

Its members were the following officials:

- the Prime Minister: Fumimaro Konoe, Hiranuma Kiichirō, Nobuyuki Abe, Mitsumasa Yonai
- the Minister of Foreign Affairs
- the Minister of War
- the Minister of the Navy
- the Chief of the Army General Staff
- the Chief of the Navy General Staff

== Supreme Council for the Direction of the War ==
In 1944, Prime Minister Kuniaki Koiso established the Supreme Council for the Direction of the War (最高戦争指導会議 Saikō sensō shidō kaigi), which replaced the Imperial General Headquarters-Government Liaison Conference. At the end of World War II, on August 14, 1945, it consisted of:

- Prime Minister: Admiral Kantarō Suzuki
- Minister of Foreign Affairs: Shigenori Tōgō
- Minister of War: General Korechika Anami
- Minister of the Navy: Admiral Mitsumasa Yonai
- Chief of the Army General Staff: General Yoshijirō Umezu
- Chief of the Navy General Staff: Admiral Soemu Toyoda

== See also ==
- Gozen Kaigi
