= January 28 incident order of battle =

This is the order of battle for the January 28 incident, also known as the first Shanghai incident, in 1932. This was a brief war between the armies of the Republic of China and the Empire of Japan that occurred prior to the Second Sino-Japanese War.

Because the Japanese assumed the tactical initiative, their forces are listed first.

== Japan ==
Shanghai Expeditionary Army
General Yoshinori Shirakawa

Chief of Staff: Lieutenant General Kanichiro Tashiro
Army troops

Mixed Regiment Medium Artillery

3 batteries (150mm howitzers, 12 guns, horse drawn)
2 batteries (100mm guns, 8 guns, horse drawn)

24th Mixed Brigade
Major General Kumaya Shimomoto

2nd Battalion / 14th Infantry Regiment
1st Battalion / 24th Infantry Regiment
1st Battalion / 46th Infantry Regiment
1st Battalion / 48th Infantry Regiment
2nd Battalion / 3rd Independent Mountain Gun Regiment
2nd Company / 18th Engineer Battalion

9th Division
Lieutenant General Kenkichi Ueda

6th Infantry Brigade

7th Infantry Regiment
35th Infantry Regiment

18th Infantry Brigade

19th Infantry Regiment
36th Infantry Regiment

9th Mountain Artillery Regiment
9th Cavalry Regiment
2nd Independent Tank Company
Captain Shigemi

5 Type 89 Medium Tanks
10 Renault NC27 Tanks

Cavalry Detachment
Artillery Battalion (150mm howitzers)
Heavy Siege Gun Unit (150mm mortars, 6 guns)

11th Division
Lieutenant General Tokutarou Koutou

10th Infantry Brigade

12th Infantry Regiment
22nd Infantry Regiment

22nd Infantry Brigade

43rd Infantry Regiment
44th Infantry Regiment

11th Mountain Artillery Regiment
11th Cavalry Regiment
11th Engineer Regiment
11th Army Service Detachment

14th Division
Lieutenant General Naosuke Matsuki

27th Infantry Brigade

2nd Infantry Regiment
59th Infantry Regiment

28th Infantry Brigade

15th Infantry Regiment
50th Infantry Regiment

20th Field Artillery Regiment
18th Cavalry Regiment
14th Engineer Regiment
14th Battalion of Army Service Corps

Army Air Service

3 bomber squadrons
1 pursuit squadron (Nieuports)
1 reconnaissance squadron

Third Fleet
Vice Admiral Kichisaburo Nomura

1st Carrier Division (Koku-sentai)

Fleet carrier Kaga (加賀) (flagship)

Nakajima A1N fighters
Mitsubishi B1M bombers

Light carrier Hōshō (鳳翔)

9 Nakajima A1N2 fighters
3 Mitsubishi B2M bombers
3 Mitsubishi C1M Type 10 reconnaissance aircraft

32 other warships including

1 Kongō-class battlecruiser: Kirishima (霧島)
1 Nagara-class cruiser: Yura (由良)
1 Tenryū-class cruiser: Tenryū (天龍)
1 Mutsuki-class destroyer: Mutsuki (睦月)

Shanghai SNLF
Captain Samejima (2,000 men) (Note: SNLF units were sent after the incident happened.)

1st Battalion (Including Sasebo 1st SNLF)
2nd Battalion (Former Kure 1st SNLF)
3rd Battalion (Former Sasebo 2nd SNLF)
4th Battalion (Former Sasebo 3rd SNLF)
5th Battalion (Former Yokosuka 1st SNLF)
7th Battalion (Former Yokosuka 2nd SNLF)

Armed reservists (est. 2,800-2,900 men) (Note: In civilian clothes, distinguished by a brassard) and Ronin (est. 100-200 men) (Note: In civilian clothes)
Total Naval forces in Shanghai as of Feb 1932: approx. 5,000 men

== China ==
Shanghai Front
General Cai Tingkai

19th Route Army
Lieutenant General Jiang Guangnai

60th Division
Major General Sheng Guanghan

119th Brigade
120th Brigade

61st Division
Lieutenant General Mao Weishou

121st Brigade
122nd Brigade

78th Division
Lieutenant General Shu Zu-nien

155th Brigade
156th Brigade

3 Chinese armored trains (500 men) (Note: Patrolled the Woosung Railroad line)
Woosung Forts Garrison (2,000 men) (Note: Harassed vessels with machine-gun fire)

5th Army
General Zhang Zhizhong

87th Division
Lieutenant General Lau Ching-yueh

174th Brigade
175th Brigade

88th Division
Lieutenant General Yu Jishi

176th Brigade
177th Brigade

Independent Brigade
Major General Wang Ken

== Sources ==
=== Print ===
- Cooke, Major Elliot .D. (Dec 1937). The Japanese attacks at Shanghai and the defense by the Chinese, 1931-1932. Military Review.

=== Web ===
- "Shanghai 1932". Axis History Forum.
- "Japanese biplane fighter aces". Håkans aviation page.
- "The Shanghai Incident". Imperial Japanese Army page.
