= Iwane Matsui =

Japanese officer, war criminal (1878–1948)

- 松井 石根
- Born: July 27, 1878; Nagoya, Aichi, Japan
- Died: December 23, 1948 (aged 70); Sugamo Prison, Tokyo, Japan
- Spouse: Fumiko Isobe (m. 1912)
- Military career
- Allegiance: Empire of Japan
- Branch: Imperial Japanese Army
- Service years: 1897–1938
- Rank: General
- Units: 6th Infantry Regiment, 3rd Division
- Commands: 11th Division; Taiwan Army of Japan; Shanghai Expeditionary Army; Central China Area Army
- Conflicts: Russo-Japanese War; Siberian Intervention; Second Sino-Japanese War; Battle of Shanghai; Defense of Sihang Warehouse; Battle of Nanking
- Awards: Order of the Golden Kite First Class, Order of the Rising Sun First Class Order of the Sacred Treasure First Class; Victory Medal; Military Medal of Honor
- Other work: President of the Greater Asia Association
- Criminal information
- Cause of death: Execution by hanging
- Status: Executed
- Conviction: War crimes
- Trial: International Military Tribunal for the Far East
- Penalty: Death

Iwane Matsui (松井 石根, Matsui Iwane; July 27, 1878 – December 23, 1948) was a Japanese general in the Imperial Japanese Army and the commander of the expeditionary force sent to China in 1937. He was convicted of war crimes and executed by the Allies for his involvement in the Nanjing Massacre.

Born in Nagoya, Matsui chose a military career and served in combat during the Russo-Japanese War (1904–05). He volunteered for an overseas assignment there shortly after graduating from the Army War College in 1906. As Matsui rose through the ranks, he earned a reputation as the Japanese Army's foremost expert on China, and he was an ardent advocate of pan-Asianism. He played a key role in founding the influential Greater Asia Association.

Matsui retired from active duty in 1935 but was called back into service in August 1937 at the start of the Second Sino-Japanese War to lead the Japanese forces engaged in the Battle of Shanghai. After winning the battle Matsui succeeded in convincing Japan's high command to advance on the Chinese capital city of Nanjing. The troops under his command who captured Nanjing on December 13 were responsible for the notorious Nanjing Massacre.

Matsui finally retired from the army in 1938. Following Japan's defeat in World War II he was convicted of war crimes at the International Military Tribunal for the Far East (IMTFE) and executed by hanging. He and other convicted war criminals were enshrined at Yasukuni Shrine in 1978, an act that has stirred controversy.

== Early life and military career, 1878–1906 ==
Iwane Matsui was born in Nagoya on July 27, 1878. He was the sixth son of Takekuni Matsui, an impoverished samurai and former retainer to the daimyō of Owari during the Tokugawa shogunate. After completing elementary school, his parents insisted that he continue his education, but Matsui worried about his father's debts and did not want to burden him financially. Though he was a short, thin, and sickly young man, Matsui opted for a career in the Army, because in Japan at that time military schools charged the lowest tuition fees.

Matsui enrolled in the Central Military Preparatory School in 1893 and in 1896 was accepted into the Imperial Japanese Army Academy. Matsui was an excellent student and graduated second in his class in November 1897. His classmates included the future generals Jinzaburō Masaki, Nobuyuki Abe, Shigeru Honjō, and Sadao Araki.

In 1901, Matsui was admitted into the Army War College, an elite institution which accepted only about ten percent of annual applicants. Matsui was still taking classes there in February 1904, when the college closed due to the outbreak of the Russo-Japanese War. He was immediately sent overseas where he served in Manchuria as a company commander in a combat unit of the 6th Regiment. During the Battle of Shoushanpu, he was wounded in action and most in his company were killed. At war's end, Matsui resumed his studies at the Army War College, and graduated at the top of his class in November 1906.

== The "China expert", 1906–31 ==
Matsui had a lifelong interest in Chinese civilization. His father was a scholar of Chinese classics and Matsui studied the Chinese language during his military education. Matsui was a fervent admirer of the recently deceased Sei Arao (1858–1896), a continental adventurer and pan-Asianist army officer from his hometown who had served in China. Arao believed that China and Japan, as the two strongest powers in Asia, had to forge a close trading and commercial partnership under Japanese hegemony to resist Western imperialism, an idea which Matsui incorporated into his own worldview. After graduating from the Army War College, Matsui immediately requested to be stationed in China. Only one other officer had made this request, since a posting in China was considered undesirable at the time. Matsui's stated ambition was to become "a second Sei Arao".

At first the Army General Staff gave Matsui an assignment in France, but in 1907 he got his wish to go to China, where he worked as an aide to the military attaché and did intelligence work. Matsui worked in China between 1907 and 1911, and then again as resident officer in Shanghai between 1915 and 1919. In 1921 Matsui was posted to Siberia as a staff officer, but returned in 1922 to China where he served until 1924 as an advisor to Zhang Zuolin in the Chinese city of Harbin and did intelligence work for Japan's Kwantung Army.

Due to his extensive experience in China Matsui became recognized as one of the most important of the Japanese Army's "China experts", and he was well known in the Army for his love of things Chinese and his hobby of writing Chinese poetry. His work took him throughout China, and he came to know many prominent Chinese soldiers and politicians. Matsui formed an especially warm friendship with Sun Yat-sen, the first president of the Republic of China. In 1907 when a young Chiang Kai-shek (then a Chinese soldier) wanted to study abroad, Matsui helped him find a place to stay in Japan.

=== Head of intelligence ===
Matsui quickly rose through the ranks and in 1923 was promoted to the rank of major general. Between 1925 and 1928 he would serve in the influential post of Chief of the Intelligence Division of the Army General Staff. He was the first "China expert" to be appointed to that position and would have a major influence determining Japan's foreign policies toward China.

As Chief of the Intelligence Division, Matsui was a strong supporter of Chiang Kai-shek, who was attempting to end the civil war in China and unify the country under his leadership. Matsui hoped that Chiang would succeed and form a strong partnership with Japan to resist both Western influence in Asia and communism. However, Matsui's tenure in office was punctuated by a series of crises. Against Matsui's advice the Japanese government sent troops to the Chinese city of Jinan in 1928 to protect Japanese property and civilians, but they ended up clashing with the Chinese Army. Matsui headed to Jinan to help settle the affair, but while he was still there Japanese army officers assassinated Zhang Zuolin, the warlord leader of Manchuria. Matsui, who had been a supporter of Zhang, immediately left for Manchuria to find out what had happened. He demanded that the officers responsible for the assassination be punished.

In December 1928 Matsui left his post as Chief of the Intelligence Division in order to make an official, year-long trip to Europe. Matsui was interested in France as well as China; he spoke fluent French and had already done work for the Japanese Army in both France and French Indochina.

== Matsui's pan-Asian vision, 1931–37 ==
Sino-Japanese relations plummeted in September 1931 when the Kwantung Army invaded Manchuria. At the time Matsui was back in Japan commanding the 11th Division, but at the end of the year he was sent to Geneva, Switzerland, to attend the World Disarmament Conference as an army plenipotentiary.

At first Matsui condemned the invasion as the work of renegade army officers, but he was equally stung by what he believed were unfair denunciations of Japan itself by Chinese delegates to the League of Nations. Matsui suspected that the Western powers and the League of Nations were deliberately attempting to provoke conflict between Japan and China. Matsui believed that the 30 million Manchurians had been relieved by the Japanese invasion and conquest, which he called 'the Empire's sympathy and good faith' and that the solution to the larger regional problem was for the nations of Asia to create their own "Asian League", which would "extend to the 400 million people of China the same help and deep sympathy that we have given Manchuria".

After returning to Japan in late 1932, Matsui abruptly appeared at the office of the Pan-Asia Study Group, a Tokyo-based think tank, and presented its members with a bold plan to expand their small organization into an international mass movement. Matsui persuaded them to adopt his ideas, and in March 1933 the study group was rechristened the Greater Asia Association (大亜細亜協会 Dai-Ajia Kyōkai), described by the historian Torsten Weber as "the single most influential organization to propagate pan-Asianism between 1933 and 1945." The goal of the Greater Asia Association was to promote "the unification, liberation, and independence of the Asian peoples", and Matsui would use the organization as a powerful vehicle to promote his "Asian League" concept both in Japan and abroad. The writings he published with the Association were widely read by Japan's political and military elites.

In August 1933 Matsui was dispatched to Taiwan to command the Taiwan Army, and then on October 20 was promoted to the rank of general, the highest rank in the Japanese Army. (Note: In the Imperial Japanese Army generals were only outranked by those with the ceremonial title of field marshal.) While in Taiwan, he took the opportunity to set up a branch of the Greater Asia Association, which declared Matsui its "honorary advisor". He then returned to Japan in August 1934 to take a seat on Japan's Supreme War Council.

Meanwhile, Sino-Japanese relations continued to deteriorate and Matsui too was gradually souring toward the Nationalist government of Chiang Kai-shek, the same government he had strongly promoted back when serving as Chief of the Intelligence Division. In the first issue of the Greater Asia Association's official bulletin, put out in 1933, Matsui denounced China's leaders for having "sold out their own country of China and betrayed Asia" due to their allegedly pro-Western attitudes. Over time he gravitated toward a group within the Army General Staff led by General Tetsuzan Nagata, which was advocating that Japan use military force to overthrow Chiang Kai-shek.

Matsui's career came to an abrupt end in August 1935 when Nagata, a member of the so-called "Control Faction", was assassinated by a member of the rival Imperial Way Faction. By this point Matsui was fed up with the ruthless factional infighting that had divided the Japanese Army, and so he decided that he would take responsibility for the scandal and resign from active duty in the Army.

=== A general in the reserves ===
Now that he was a reservist, Matsui had more time to pursue his pan-Asian project. Between October and December 1935 he toured the major cities of China and Manchukuo speaking to Chinese politicians and businessmen about pan-Asianism and setting up a new branch of the Greater Asia Association in Tianjin. Upon his return to Japan in December 1935 he became President of the Greater Asia Association. In February and March 1936, amid ongoing tension with China, Matsui made a second trip to China, this time on a government-sponsored goodwill tour. Matsui met personally with Chiang, and though he found little common ground with him, they at least were united in their anti-communism. Matsui came out of the meeting believing that joint anti-communism could be the basis for Sino-Japanese cooperation in the future. Then in December 1936, following the Xi'an Incident, Chiang agreed to join with the Chinese Communist Party to resist Japan, a move that Matsui viewed as a personal betrayal.

== At war in China, 1937–38 ==
In July 1937, following the Marco Polo Bridge Incident, full-scale war broke out between Japan and China. Initially limited to northern China, the fighting spread in August to Shanghai. The Japanese government decided to send two divisions of reinforcements to drive the Chinese Army from Shanghai, which would be organized as the Shanghai Expeditionary Army (SEA). Due to a shortage of active duty generals, the Army General Staff opted to pull someone from the reserves to lead the new army and on August 15 Matsui was officially appointed commander of the SEA. The reason why Matsui was selected is not entirely clear, but his reputation as a "China expert" was likely a major factor. The historian Ikuhiko Hata argues that at the time the Army General Staff was hoping to seek a settlement with China once Shanghai had been secured for Japan, and Matsui, because of his close friendships with China's leaders, was seen as an ideal candidate to conduct the negotiations. Matsui declared that his mission would be "to make the Chinese people recognize that Japanese troops are the real friends of China", and likewise stated that "I am going to the front not to fight an enemy but in the state of mind of one who sets out to pacify his brother." However, one of his old acquaintances in the Chinese Army remarked in The New York Times, "There can be no friendship between us while there is war between China and Japan."

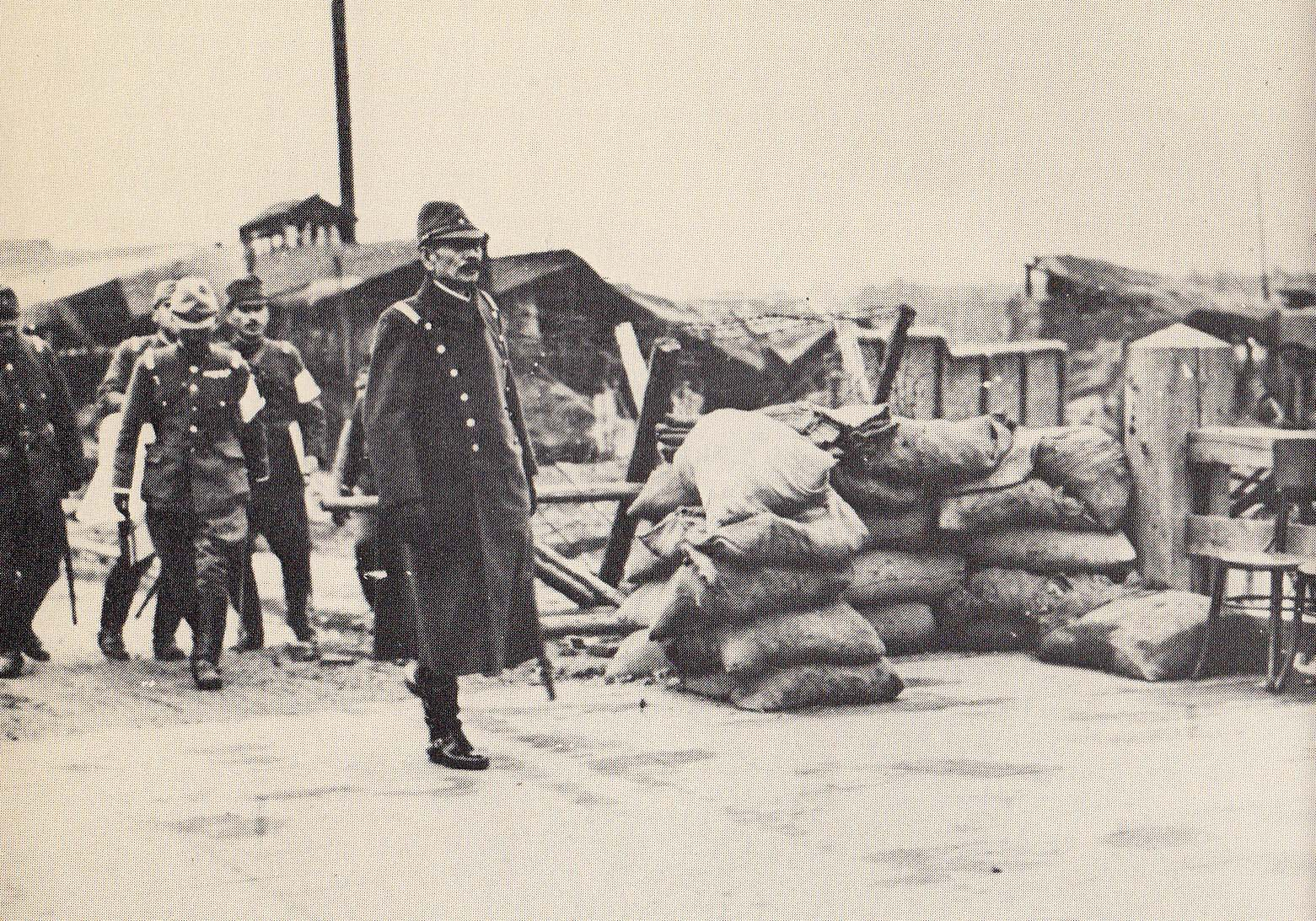
Matsui inspecting the front lines in Shanghai in September 1937

While sailing to Shanghai Matsui adopted a plan drawn by the Japanese Navy to divide the SEA between two landing sites north of Shanghai, Wusong and Chuanshakou, and then use the former force to attack Shanghai directly and the latter force to encircle the Chinese Army. On August 23 Matsui oversaw the landing operation from aboard his flagship the Yura. The initial landings went well, but increasingly intense fighting ensued on land and casualties mounted. Matsui had never believed that he had been given enough soldiers to handle the job and was continuously pressing the high command for more reinforcements. He himself was not able to go ashore in Shanghai until September 10, but that was the same day on which the Army General Staff informed him that three additional divisions would be deployed under his command. Still, even this infusion of new troops proved insufficient to dislodge the Chinese. He had mistakenly judged at the beginning of October that the Chinese Army was about to withdraw from Shanghai and had ordered concentrated infantry charges on the Chinese positions in the expectation that the campaign would be wrapped up before November. In fact the SEA was still battering Chinese defensive lines at Nanxiang and Suzhou Creek at that point. The turning point of the campaign did not come until November 5 when an entirely new army, the 10th Army led by Heisuke Yanagawa, landed south of Shanghai and forced the Chinese Army to make a hasty retreat. Shanghai had finally fallen by November 26.

The fighting also took a toll on Chinese civilians, and even at the height of the battle Matsui took a special interest in the plight of Chinese refugees. In October he ordered that improvements be made to living conditions in Chinese refugee camps and later he made a large personal donation of $10,000 to the French humanitarian Father Jacquinot to help him in establishing a "safety zone" for Chinese civilians in Shanghai.

=== Road to Nanjing ===
On November 7 Matsui was appointed commander of the Central China Area Army (CCAA), a new position created to provide unified leadership to the SEA and the 10th Army. Matsui continued to command the SEA as well until Prince Asaka was appointed to take over from him on December 2. Nonetheless, the Army General Staff was keen on keeping the war as contained as possible and so at the same time that it created the CCAA it also laid down an "operation restriction line" forbidding the CCAA from leaving the vicinity of Shanghai.

However, Matsui had made it clear to his superiors even before he had left Japan in August that he was determined to capture the capital city of China, Nanjing, which lay 300 kilometers west of Shanghai. Matsui forcefully asserted that the war with China would not end until Nanjing was in their control, and he envisaged that the fall of Nanjing would result in the total collapse of Chiang Kai-shek's government. After Chiang's fall Matsui hoped to play a role in forming a new government in China which, according to his own conception, would be a democracy that would better serve the interests of both Japan and the people of China. However, the historian Tokushi Kasahara also sees personal motives behind Matsui's insistence on capturing Nanjing. Kasahara suspects that Matsui, as an aging general with a relatively undistinguished military record, desperately wanted to crown his career with one last battlefield victory like the capture of the Chinese capital.

Ultimately it was Heisuke Yanagawa's 10th Army which, on November 19, abruptly crossed the operation restriction line and began advancing on Nanjing. In response to this flagrant act of insubordination, Matsui, it is claimed, made some effort to restrain Yanagawa, but he also insisted to the high command that marching on Nanjing was the right course of action. On December 1 the Army General Staff finally came around and approved an operation against Nanjing, though by then many of Japan's units in the field were already well on their way.

Matsui had gotten his way, but he still understood that his troops were tired from the fighting in Shanghai. He therefore decided to advance slowly with the aim of securing the city within two months. Nevertheless, his subordinates refused to play along and instead raced with one another to be the first to Nanjing. Matsui revised his plans only upon discovering that his own armies were well ahead of their scheduled operational targets. It is again argued that Matsui was unable to restrain the men under his command, and that, since Matsui was an elderly general pulled from retirement, most of his younger and brasher subordinates had little respect for his orders and assumed that he would be back in the reserves and shortly out of their way. Matsui's command problems were made further complicated by the fact that, between December 5 and 15, he was frequently bedridden due to bouts of tuberculosis, which he had first shown symptoms of on November 4. Though ill, he forced himself to press on with his duties, issuing orders from his sickbed. On December 7 he moved his command post from Shanghai to Suzhou to be closer to the frontlines, and on December 9 he ordered that a "summons to surrender" be dropped by airplane over Nanjing. Because the Chinese Army defending Nanjing did not respond, the next day Matsui approved an all-out attack on the city. The CCAA suffered significant casualties fighting along the mountainous terrain just north of the city because Matsui had forbidden his men from using artillery there to prevent any damage from coming to its two famous historical sites, Sun Yat-sen Mausoleum and Ming Xiaoling Mausoleum. Although the Chinese garrison defending Nanjing collapsed under pressure of the Japanese attack within a few days, instead of formally surrendering the Chinese soldiers simply threw away their uniforms and weapons and then merged with the city's civilian population. The Japanese occupied Nanjing on the night of December 12/13. Japanese soldiers in the city then massacred prisoners of war and engaged in random acts of murder, looting, torture, and rape which are collectively known as the Nanjing Massacre.

=== The Nanjing Massacre ===
Matsui and his staff officers in the CCAA had been especially intent on ensuring that the property and citizens of third party nations were not harmed in order to avoid causing an international incident; they had foreseen the possibility that their troops might disobey orders upon entering Nanjing, as many of them were poorly disciplined reservists. To forestall this possibility, Matsui tacked a lengthy addendum entitled "Essentials for Assaulting Nanjing" onto the comprehensive operational orders that he passed down to all units on December 7. In "Essentials" Matsui instructed each of his divisions to only allow one of their regiments into the city itself in order to reduce the Japanese Army's contact with Chinese civilians, and he reminded all his subordinates that criminal acts such as looting or arson would be severely punished, though in the court martial ledger for December 20, Matsui, taking note of raping and looting incidents, wrote that 'the truth is that some such acts are unavoidable'. Ultimately, Matsui's orders were again disobeyed. Most of the buildings and civilian homes outside Nanjing had been burned down by the Chinese Army to deprive the Japanese of shelter, so Matsui's subordinate commanders decided on their own that they had no choice but to station all their men within the city itself.

Nevertheless, Matsui's instructions said nothing about treatment of Chinese POWs. Matsui inadvertently contributed to the atrocity in a major way when he demanded on December 14 that his triumphal entrance into Nanjing be scheduled for the early date of December 17. At the time his subordinates in Nanjing objected because they were still in the process of scrambling to apprehend all the former Chinese soldiers hiding in the city and had no facilities in which to hold them. Regardless, Matsui held firm, and in many cases his men responded to the conundrum by ordering that all their prisoners be executed immediately after capture. Most of the large-scale massacres that took place within Nanjing occurred in the days immediately prior to Matsui's entrance into the city.

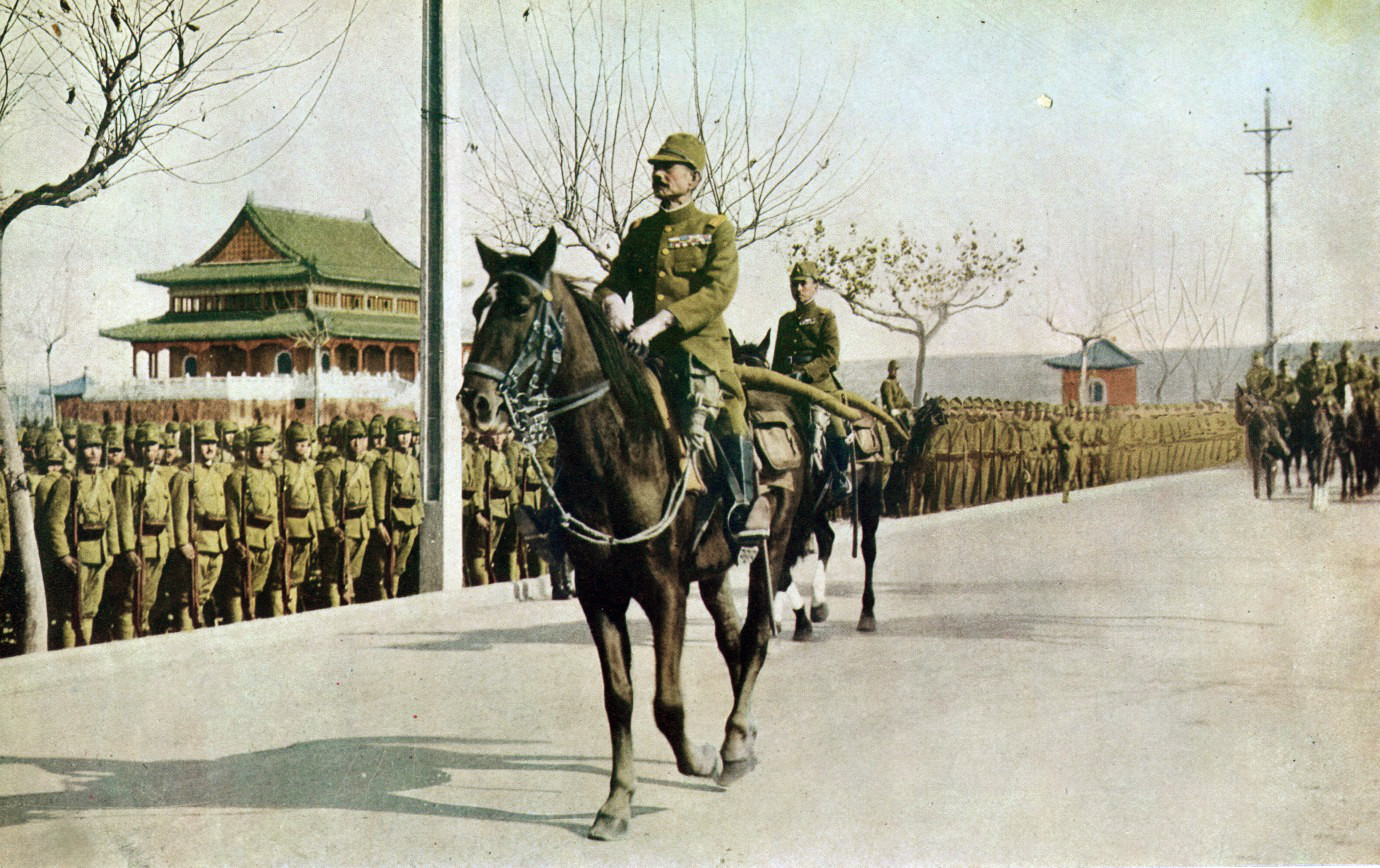
Matsui riding into Nanjing on December 17, 1937

On December 16 Matsui spent the day recovering from his malaria at the Tangshuizhen hot springs east of Nanjing, and then the next day he rode into Nanjing itself at the head of a large victory parade. It is not clear to what extent Matsui was aware of the atrocities perpetrated in Nanjing. His former Chief of Staff in the SEA later testified that Matsui had been informed of "a few cases of plunder and outrage" shortly after entering the city, and Matsui's own field diary also mentions being told that Japanese troops had committed acts of rape and looting. Matsui commented in his field diary, "The truth is that some such acts are unavoidable." When a representative from the Japanese Foreign Ministry came to investigate the matter, Matsui admitted that some crimes had occurred and he blamed his subordinate commanders for allowing too many soldiers into the city in violation of his orders. After the war, Matsui's aide-de-camp Yoshiharu Sumi claimed that not long after the capture of Nanjing Matsui caught wind of a plan by some of his subordinates to massacre Chinese POWs and upon hearing of this he immediately put a stop to it. However researchers have since discovered that Sumi's testimony contained a large number of inaccuracies.

Matsui left Nanjing on December 22 and returned to Shanghai, though reports of scandalous incidents perpetrated by Japanese soldiers in Nanjing continued to filter in to his headquarters over the following month. When Matsui returned to Nanjing on February 7, 1938, for a two-day tour he assembled his subordinates, including Prince Asaka and Heisuke Yanagawa, and harangued them for failing to prevent "a number of abominable incidents within the past 50 days".

=== Final days in China ===
The capture of Nanjing had not led to the surrender of the Nationalist Government as Matsui had predicted and the war with China continued. Undeterred, Matsui began planning out new military operations in places such as Xuzhou and Zhejiang province soon after he had returned to Shanghai. The other big task occupying his time in January and February 1938 was his plan to establish a new Chinese government in Central China. Matsui was bound and determined to press forward with his ambition to found a new regime to rival Chiang Kai-shek's Nationalist Government, and though he did not finish the job before leaving office, the Reformed Government of the Republic of China would eventually come into being in March 1938. However, the leaders of Japan's Army General Staff showed scant interest in his plan to create a new government in China and they also repeatedly refused to approve any new military campaigns under his command. By the beginning of February Matsui was contemplating suicide to protest their lack of enthusiasm.

By then, there was already a movement within the Army General Staff to have Matsui removed from his post. Reports of the atrocities in Nanjing had reached the Japanese government and some within the Army General Staff blamed Matsui for mishandling the crisis and causing Japan international embarrassment. Some even wanted him court-martialed for negligence. Even so, the Japanese government was not planning on dismissing Matsui solely because of the Nanjing Massacre. The Foreign Ministry was displeased by anti-Western statements Matsui had made after becoming CCAA commander, including his comment that he did not recognize the neutrality of foreign concessions in Shanghai, and the Army General Staff was concerned about Matsui's severe personality conflicts with his subordinate commanders, which were interfering with the chain of command. The Army Minister Hajime Sugiyama told General Shunroku Hata that the inability of Matsui and his subordinates to coordinate and cooperate with one another was the reason he was being removed.

On February 10 Matsui received a messenger from the Army General Staff who informed him, much to Matsui's chagrin and disappointment, that he would soon be relieved of command and replaced with Shunroku Hata. Ultimately, the Army General Staff did not punish Matsui but they did shake up the whole field command in China and Matsui was just one of eighty senior officers, including Asaka and Yanagawa, who were all recalled at the same time.

== Life in retirement, 1938–46 ==
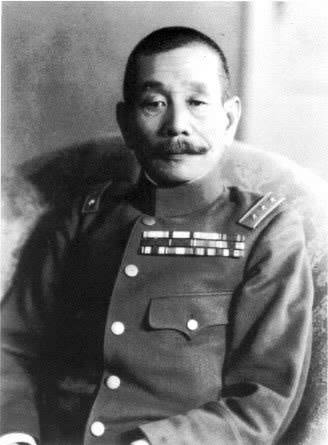
Iwane Matsui, c. 1930s

Matsui sailed out of Shanghai on February 21, 1938, and landed back in Japan on February 23. Though the time and place of his return to Japan had been kept secret by the military, reporters quickly caught wind of his return and soon Matsui was being greeted everywhere he went by cheering crowds. Later that year Matsui bought a new home in Atami in Shizuoka Prefecture and from then until 1946 he spent his winters living in Atami and his summers living at his old house on Lake Yamanaka.

In spite of retiring from the military, Matsui hoped to get another job in China working with the Japanese-sponsored government there. Ultimately, he instead accepted the position of Cabinet Councillor, an advisory post, in June 1938. He continued to serve in this capacity until January 1940 when he resigned to protest Prime Minister Mitsumasa Yonai's opposition to an alliance with Nazi Germany and Fascist Italy.

It was also in 1940 that Matsui commissioned the construction of a statue of Kannon, the bodhisattva of mercy, and then had a special temple built in Atami to enshrine it. He named it the Koa Kannon, which means the "Pan-Asian Kannon", and he consecrated it in honor of all the Japanese and Chinese soldiers who perished during the Second Sino-Japanese War. At the time The New York Times praised Matsui's act, noting that "few Western generals have ever devoted their declining years to the memory of the men who died in their battles". Henceforth, on every single day that Matsui spent in Atami for the rest of his life he prayed in front of the Koa Kannon once early in the morning and once in the evening.

Throughout this time Matsui remained active in the pan-Asian movement. Although the Greater Asia Association was reorganized several times between 1942 and 1945, at no point did Matsui ever cease to serve as either the President or Vice President of the organization. Following Japan's entrance into World War II in December 1941, Matsui strongly advocated that Japan grant independence to the new territories it had occupied during the war and then form an alliance of Asian states to combat the Allied Powers. Between June and August 1943 Matsui undertook a tour of Asia, including China, Indochina, Singapore, Thailand, Burma, Malaysia, Indonesia, and the Philippines in order to promote his ideas. Matsui met with Wang Jingwei in China and with Subhas Chandra Bose, the head of the Indian National Army, in Singapore. He also caused a diplomatic incident in Indochina, which was still nominally under French colonial rule, when he delivered a speech demanding that it be granted full independence. Matsui's efforts played a key role in the creation and consolidation of the Greater East Asia Co-Prosperity Sphere, which was the culmination of Matsui's lifelong vision of an "Asian League" united against the West.

In addition to the Greater Asia Association, Matsui also served throughout the war as President of the Association for the National Defense Concept, a virulently anti-Western and anti-Semitic organization founded in February 1942 to support the Japanese war effort. In 1945 as the Allies bore down on the Philippines Matsui declared over the radio that Japan would never withdraw from the Philippines "even though Tokyo should be reduced to ashes." Soon after he also stated his plans to speak at a lecture meeting on August 20 opposing any surrender. Nevertheless, on August 15, 1945, at his home in Atami Matsui heard Emperor Hirohito announce that Japan had surrendered unconditionally to the Allies.

The Allied occupation of Japan began soon after. On November 19 the Supreme Commander for the Allied Powers issued an arrest warrant for Matsui on suspicion of war crimes. Matsui was ill with pneumonia at the time and so was given until March to recover. One of Matsui's final acts before going to prison was to ask his wife to adopt their longtime maid Hisae as their daughter. He also converted from Shintoism to Buddhism and asked that his wife do the same. On March 6, 1946, he surrendered himself in to Sugamo Prison.

== On trial in Tokyo, 1946–48 ==
On April 29, 1946, Iwane Matsui became one of twenty-eight individuals formally indicted before the International Military Tribunal for the Far East (IMTFE), a tribunal established by the Allies of World War II to try Japanese war criminals. The prosecution charged Matsui with Class A war crimes or "crimes against peace", alleging that he had participated in a conspiracy to wage aggressive war against other countries, and also with Class B/C war crimes or "conventional war crimes", alleging that he was responsible for the Nanjing Massacre of 1937 to 1938. (Note: The IMTFE did not readily distinguish between Class B and Class C war crimes, which were generally grouped together.)

Matsui had told friends before going to Sugamo Prison that at the IMTFE he planned to defend not only himself but also Japan's wartime conduct as a whole. Matsui insisted that Japan had acted defensively against aggression by foreign powers and that Japan's war aims were to liberate Asia from Western imperialism. Concerning the origins of the Second Sino-Japanese War, Matsui called it "a fight between brothers within the 'Asian family'" and stated that the war was fought against the Chinese, not "because we hate them, but on the contrary because we love them too much. It is just the same in a family when an elder brother has taken all that he can stand from his ill-behaved younger brother and has to chastise him in order to make him behave properly."

On the matter of the Nanjing Massacre, Matsui admitted that he was aware of a few isolated crimes committed by individual soldiers, including acts of rape, looting, and murder, but he adamantly denied that any large-scale massacres had occurred in the city. Still, Matsui admitted to the IMTFE that he bore "moral responsibility" for the wrongdoing of his men. He denied that he bore "legal responsibility" because, he claimed, it was the military police of each division who were in charge of prosecuting individual criminal acts, not the army commander. However, Matsui also testified that he had urged that any offenders be sternly punished, a statement which, the prosecution quickly noted, implied that he did have some level of legal responsibility.

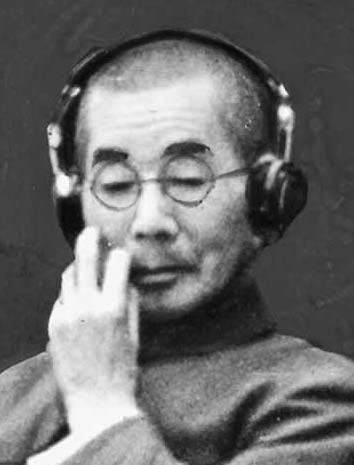
Matsui listening to the proceedings of the IMTFE

Ultimately the IMTFE dismissed most of the accusations laid against Matsui. Of the thirty-eight counts he was charged with, Matsui was found not guilty of thirty-seven, including all charges relating to Class A war crimes. The judges rejected Matsui's membership in the Greater Asia Association as being evidence that he was involved in the "conspiracy" to wage wars of aggression.

Nonetheless, for his role in the Nanjing Massacre, he was convicted and sentenced to death under Count 55, charging defendants with having "deliberately and recklessly disregarded their legal duty to take adequate steps to secure the observance and prevent breaches" of the laws of war. The IMTFE delivered the following verdict on November 12, 1948.

The Tribunal is satisfied that Matsui knew what was happening. He did nothing, or nothing effective to abate these horrors. He did issue orders before the capture of the city enjoining propriety of conduct upon his troops and later he issued further orders to the same purport. These orders were of no effect as is now known, and as he must have known... He was in command of the Army responsible for these happenings. He knew of them. He had the power, as he had the duty, to control his troops and to protect the unfortunate citizens of Nanking. He must be held criminally responsible for his failure to discharge this duty.

Historian Yuma Totani notes that this verdict represents "one of the earliest precedents for command responsibility in the history of international law." Shortly after hearing the verdict Matsui confided to his prison chaplain, Shinsho Hanayama, his feelings about the atrocities in Nanjing and the rebuke he delivered to his subordinates on February 7, 1938. He blamed the atrocities on the alleged moral decline of the Japanese Army since the Russo-Japanese War, and said,

The Nanjing Incident was a terrible disgrace ... Immediately after the memorial services, I assembled the higher officers and wept tears of anger before them, as Commander-in-Chief ... I told them that after all our efforts to enhance the Imperial prestige, everything had been lost in one moment through the brutalities of the soldiers. And can you imagine it, even after that, these officers laughed at me ... I am really, therefore, quite happy that I, at least, should have ended this way, in the sense that it may serve to urge self-reflection on many more members of the military of that time.

On the night of December 22, 1948, Matsui met fellow condemned inmates Hideki Tojo, Akira Mutō, and Kenji Doihara at the prison chapel. As the oldest member of the group, Matsui was asked to lead them in shouting three cheers of banzai to the Emperor. Then he led the group up to the gallows where they were all hanged simultaneously shortly after midnight on the morning of December 23, 1948.

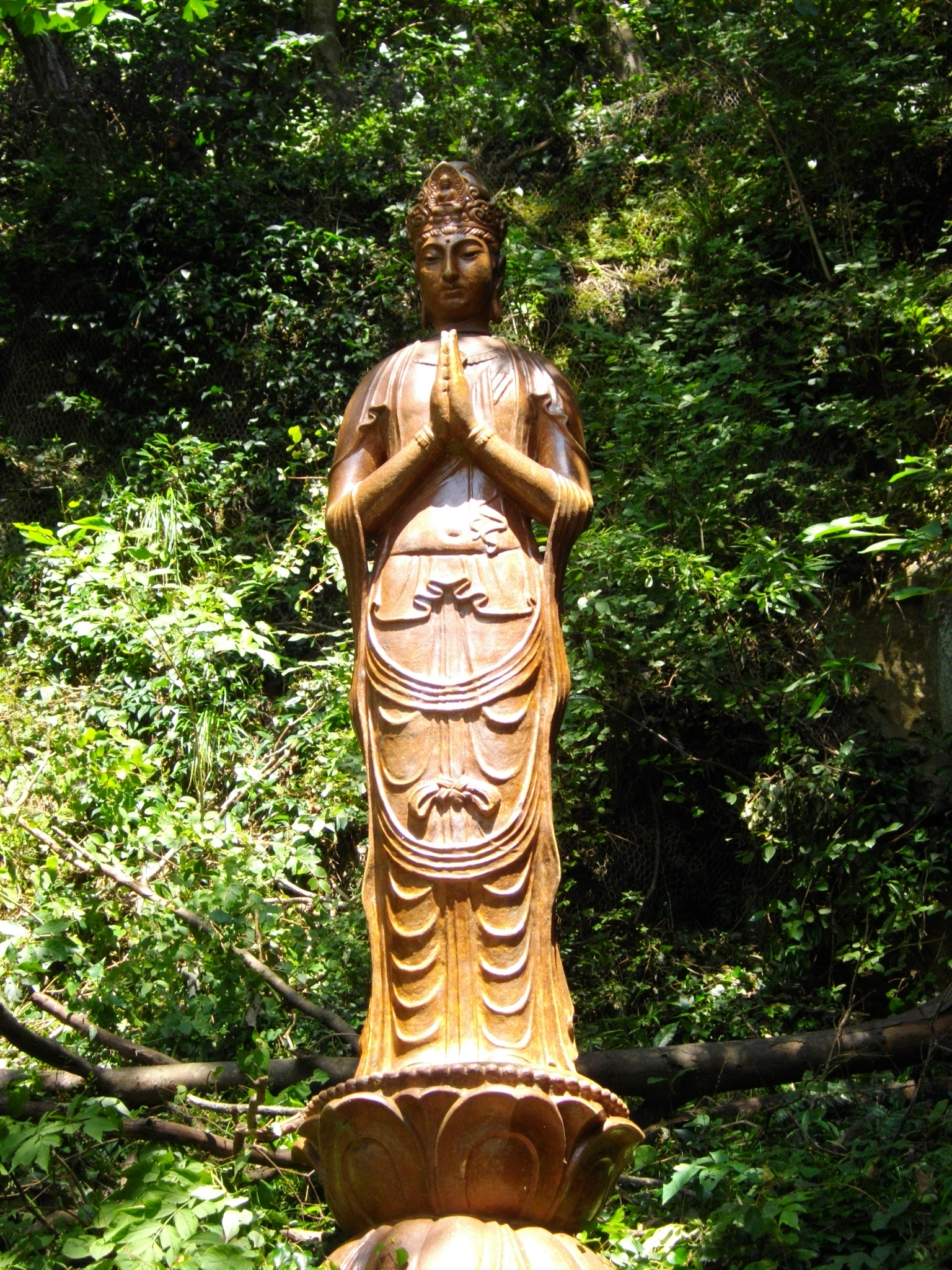
Matsui's ashes were secretly buried at Koa Kannon in Atami

Soon after Matsui was executed, he was cremated and the US Army took away his ashes to prevent a memorial from being created. However, unbeknownst to them, some of the ashes had been hidden by the owner of the crematorium. He later brought these ashes to the shrine Matsui had founded, the Koa Kannon, and they remain there to this day. In 1978, all seven war criminals executed by the IMTFE, including Iwane Matsui, were officially enshrined in Yasukuni Shrine in a secret ceremony conducted by head priest Nagayoshi Matsudaira. This event did not become publicly known until the following year.

== Assessments and perception ==
In Japan the majority of the historical literature on Iwane Matsui's life focuses on his role in the Nanjing Massacre. He has both sympathizers, who depict him as "the tragic general" who was unjustly executed, and detractors, who assert that he had the blood of a massacre on his hands. Among his detractors is the historian Yutaka Yoshida, who believes that Matsui made six serious mistakes which contributed to the massacre. Firstly, he insisted on advancing on Nanjing without ensuring proper logistical support which forced his men to rely on plunder. Secondly, he established no policies to protect the safety of Chinese POWs. Thirdly, he permitted an excessively large number of soldiers to enter the city of Nanjing. Fourthly, he did not cooperate sufficiently with the International Committee for the Nanking Safety Zone. Fifthly, he insisted that his triumphal entrance into Nanjing be held at an early date, a demand which his subordinate commanders responded to by increasing the speed and severity of their operations. Finally, he spent too much time on political maneuvering and neglected his duties as commander. The historian Keiichi Eguchi and the researcher Toshio Tanabe likewise find that Matsui bears responsibility for urging the government to march on Nanjing, which led directly to the massacre. Tanabe concurs with Yoshida that Matsui should have put in place policies to protect Chinese POWs and should not have ordered a premature triumphal entrance into the city of Nanjing.

Nevertheless, other historians like Masahiro Yamamoto have argued that the death sentence was too severe a penalty for Matsui's crime of mere negligence in failing to stop the massacre. The journalist Richard Minear also points out that Matsui's penalty was disproportionately severe compared to the other convicted defendants. Kuniaki Koiso was found guilty on four counts and Mamoru Shigemitsu was found guilty on five counts, in both cases including one count of negligence, and both were given prison sentences. Matsui, by contrast, was found guilty of only one count of negligence but was sentenced to death. The historian Tokushi Kasahara argues that the prosecution at the IMTFE did not attempt seriously to investigate all those who were involved in the Nanjing Massacre, and instead just decided to make Matsui the sole scapegoat for the whole atrocity.

Matsui has a somewhat infamous reputation in China today. The popular nonfiction author Takashi Hayasaka asserts that he often heard Matsui referred to as "the Hitler of Japan" by Chinese citizens during his travels in the city of Nanjing because of Matsui's connection to the Nanjing Massacre. However, Matsui's name was not always notorious in China for this reason. In 1945 the Chinese Communist Party denounced Matsui as a war criminal because of his propaganda work for an ultranationalist group, rather than for the Nanjing Massacre. Historian Masataka Matsuura notes that the focus within current scholarship on Matsui's role in the Nanjing Massacre has distracted from the fact that his pan-Asianism was the defining characteristic of his life.

== Writings in English ==
- The Japanese Army and the Dispute in the Far East (Geneva: Kundig, 1932)
- An Asiatic League of Nations (Tokyo: Office of the Greater Asia Association, 1937)

== Bibliography ==
- Hayasaka, Takashi, 松井石根と南京事件の真実 (Iwane Matsui and the Truth about the Nanking Massacre) (Tokyo: Bungei Shunjū, 2011)
- Hayase, Toshiyuki, 将軍の真実 : 松井石根人物伝 (The Truth about the General: A Character Biography of Iwane Matsui) (Tokyo: Kōjinsha, 1999)
- Matsuura, Masataka, 「大東亜戦争」はなぜ起きたのか (The Origin of the 'Greater Asian War') (Nagoya: Nagoya Daigaku Shuppankai, 2010)
- Tanaka, Masaaki, 松井石根大将の陣中日記 (The Field Diary of General Iwane Matsui) (Tokyo: Fuyo Shobo, 1985)

Military offices
Preceded by Rokuichi Koizumi	Commander, 11th Division; Aug 1929 – Aug 1931	Succeeded by Kōtō Tokutarō
Preceded by Nobuyuki Abe	Commander, IJA Taiwan Army; Aug 1933 – Aug 1934	Succeeded by Hisaichi Terauchi
Preceded by none	Commander, Shanghai Expeditionary Army; Aug 1937 – Dec 1937	Succeeded by Prince Asaka Yasuhiko
Preceded by none	Commander, Japanese Central China Area Army; Oct 1937 – Feb 1938	Succeeded by none
