= Hongkou Park Incident =

1932 bombing attack in Shanghai, China

- Part of the Korean independence movement
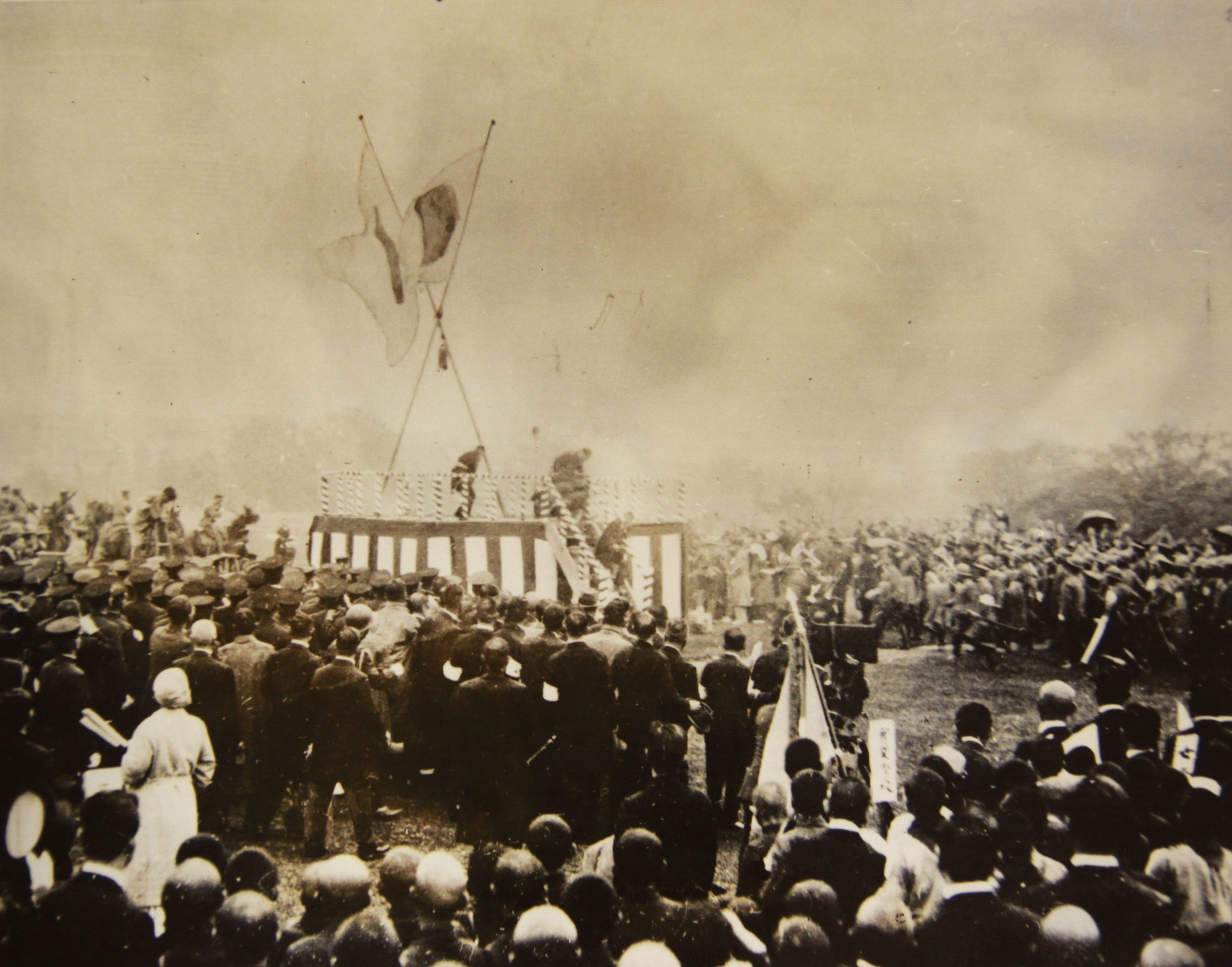
- Hongkou Park shortly after bomb detonation (April 29, 1932)
- Location: Hongkou Park, Shanghai, Republic of China; 31.272836°N 121.478425°E
- Planned by: Korean Patriotic Organization; (Provisional Government of the Republic of Korea)
- Commanded by: Kim Ku
- Objective: Assassinate prominent Japanese military and colonial personnel
- Date: April 29, 1932; 11:40 am
- Executed by: Yun Bong-gil
- Outcome: Attack succeeds, Yun captured and executed, Republic of China begins supporting the Korean Provisional Government
- Casualties: 2 killed at least 7 injured (See § Casualties)
- Location of attack relative to present day Shanghai

Hongkou Park Incident

Chinese name
- Chinese: 虹口公园爆炸事件
- Literal meaning: Hongkou Park Bombing Incident
Transcriptions
Standard Mandarin
- Hanyu Pinyin: Hóngkǒu Gōngyuán Bàozhà Shìjiàn

Korean name
- Hangul: 훙커우 공원 사건
- Hanja: 虹口公園事件
- Literal meaning: Hongkou Park Incident
Transcriptions
- Revised Romanization: Hungkeou Gongwon Sageon
- McCune–Reischauer: Hungk'ŏu kongwŏn sagŏn

Japanese name
- Kanji: 上海天長節爆弾事件
Transcriptions
- Revised Hepburn: Shanhai Tenchōsetsu Bakudan Jiken

The Hongkou Park Incident was a bombing attack on military and colonial personnel of the Empire of Japan at 11:40 am on April 29, 1932. It occurred at Hongkou Park (now "Lu Xun Park"), Shanghai, Republic of China, during a ceremony that honored the birthday of the Emperor of Japan, Hirohito.

The attack was planned and conducted by the Korean Patriotic Organization, a militant arm of the Korean Provisional Government (KPG). The KPG was a government in exile for Korea formed in Shanghai in 1919 after the Japanese colonized Korea in 1910. It was motivated by advocacy for the independence of Korea from the Empire of Japan.

The attacker, Yun Bong-gil, was given two homemade bombs for the attack. He set off the first bomb on the main stage of a rally, which killed Japanese General Yoshinori Shirakawa and head of the Japanese Residents' Association of Shanghai Kawabata Teiji and blew a hole in the stage. A number of other Japanese people were wounded, with injuries ranging from severe to minor. Minister to China Mamoru Shigemitsu and Lieutenant General Kenkichi Ueda each lost a leg, and Admiral Kichisaburō Nomura lost an eye. A reporter and sailor also received minor injuries. Yun attempted to set off the second bomb in order to kill himself, but the bomb did not go off. The crowd began beating him, and likely would have beat him to death if he had not been pulled away by Japanese soldiers. After being interrogated for information, he was tried and sentenced to death in a single trial on May 25. He was transferred to Japan in November, and executed on December 19.

As a result of the attack, Japanese and French police began interrogating Koreans in the cities, and members of the KPG went into hiding. The attack earned the KPG the respect of Chinese leader Chiang Kai-shek, who began sheltering and funding them. Yun is now viewed as a martyr in both South Korea and China. A number of monuments to him exist in both countries.

== Motivation ==
From 1910 to 1945, Korea was a colony of the Empire of Japan. In 1919, protests against Japanese rule were held throughout Korea, in what became known as the March First Movement. After the Japanese violently cracked down on the protests, numerous Koreans fled the peninsula and continued resisting the Japanese from abroad.

=== Korean Provisional Government ===
Among the escapees to China were the eventual founders of the Korean Provisional Government (KPG). The KPG was founded in Shanghai a month after the March 1st Movement. Political leanings were diverse within the KPG, with some strongly left and right leaning members. Opinions on how to obtain independence were also diverse, with preferences ranging from pacifism to militantism.

=== Korean Patriotic Organization ===
In 1931, a militant organization affiliated with the KPG called the Korean Patriotic Organization (KPO) was founded. It was led by Kim Ku, a significant Korean independence activist who is now held in high esteem in South Korea. Kim set about coordinating a number of attacks on Japanese leaders, including a January 1932 attack in Tokyo that nearly killed Emperor Hirohito. That attack is now known as the Sakuradamon Incident.

== Attacker ==
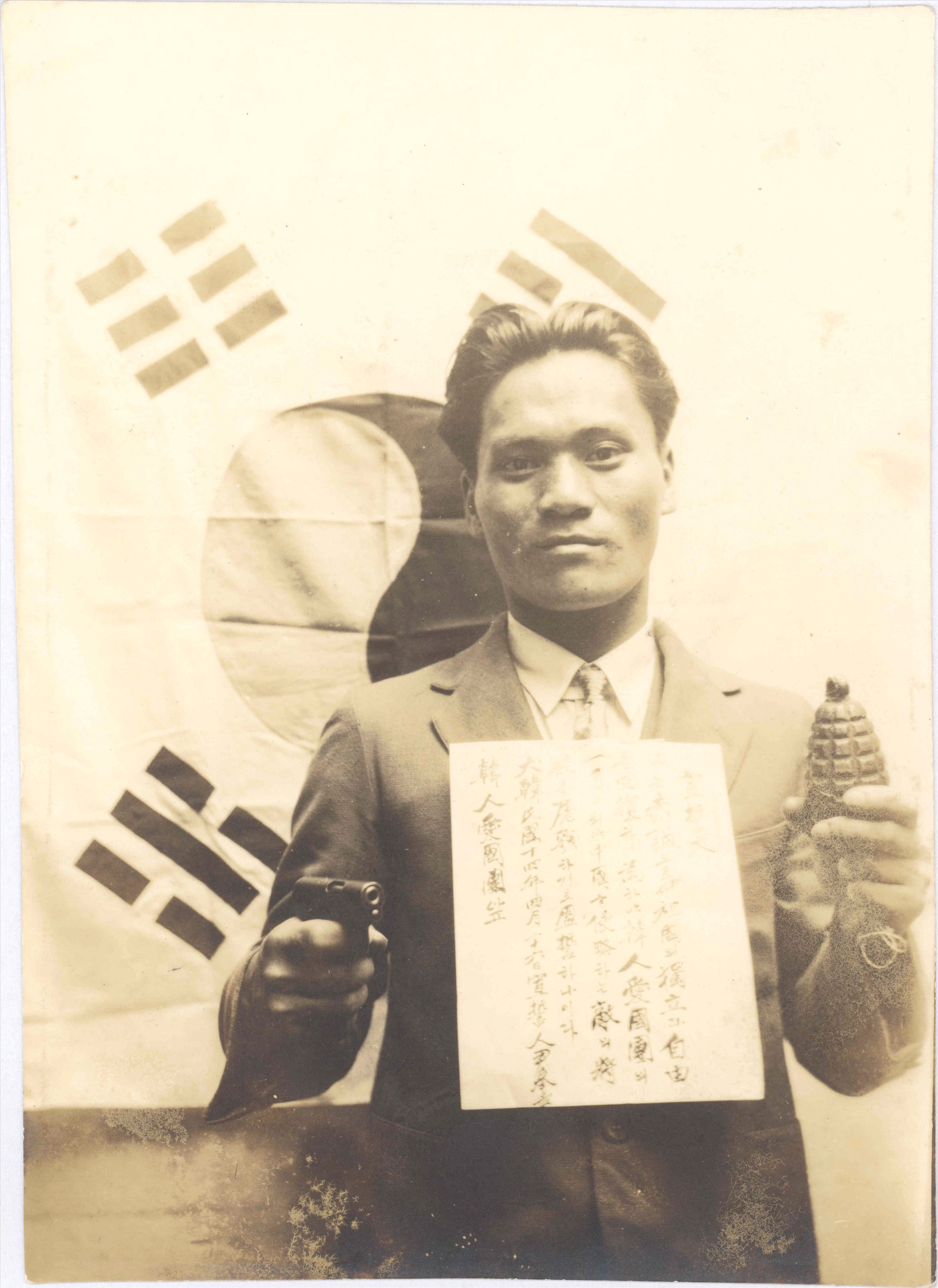
Yun days before the attack

Yun Bong-gil (1908–1932) was a Korean independence activist. He witnessed the March 1st Movement and was appalled by its repression. He initially sought to advocate for Korean independence through encouraging education and activism, but became disillusioned after continued Japanese suppression. In 1930, he left his wife and two children in Korea to join the KPG and become a militant.

After his arrival in Shanghai, he worked closely with Kim Ku to plan the attack.

== Attack ==
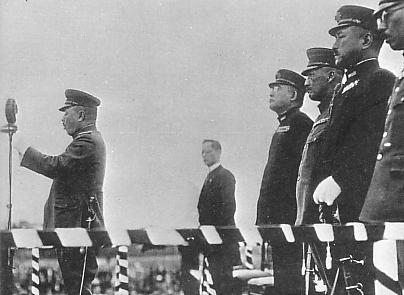
General Yoshinori Shirakawa addresses the crowd shortly before the explosion (1932)

On April 29, 1932, a rally honoring the birthday of Japanese Emperor Hirohito occurred. Around 9:30 am, an audience of around 15,000 people, mostly Japanese, gathered to watch 10,000 Japanese troops parade down Jiangwan Road in Shanghai. The troops ended the parade in Hongkou Park, where a decorated stage was set up.

Japanese colonial and military officials went onto the stage, including Yoshinori Shirakawa, Kenkichi Ueda, Kichisaburō Nomura, and Tomono Mori. They were joined by a number of foreign officials, including representatives of the Shanghai Volunteer Corps (Admiral Howard Kelly and Major Ronald Penney), and officials of Italy, France, and the United States.

Kawabata Teiji gave the first speech, and a number of others followed. After their speeches, the foreign officials departed from the stage, leaving ten Japanese officials there. Several hundred Japanese children gathered in front of the stage, and the military band began to play the Japanese national anthem, Kimigayo.

Just before the anthem finished, Yun threw the bomb. The Illustrated London News reported that:

The Japanese National Anthem was being played, when a youth was seen to step forward and place a cylinder on the front of the dais (Note: The North China Daily News reported that he threw a square object high in the air.) and then dart backwards. A dull explosion immediately followed, but it attracted so little attention that the music continued playing. [...] others were seen to collapse wounded and bleeding, while soldiers seized the youth and battered him. Subsequently, another bomb of the same pattern was found near the dais unexploded."

Kawabata and Mamoru Shigemitsu fell to the floor in pain, and Shirakawa clutched his face, which was then streaming with blood. The explosion was so powerful that it blew a hole in the floor of the stage. After a moment of silence, the crowd began to panic. Members of the Red Cross rushed over to assist the wounded.

== Aftermath ==
=== Casualties ===
The following casualties occurred as a result of the attack:

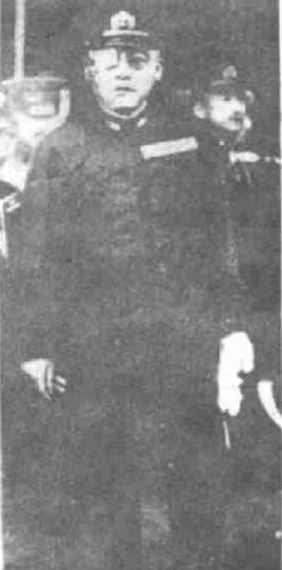
Kichisaburō Nomura with damaged eye after the bombing (1932)

Person	Role	Fate
Yoshinori Shirakawa	General	Died of injuries on May 26
Kawabata Teiji	Head of the Japanese Residents' Association of Shanghai	Died
Mamoru Shigemitsu	Minister to China	Lost a leg
Kenkichi Ueda	Lieutenant General	Lost a leg and had an injured arm
Kichisaburō Nomura	Admiral	Lost an eye
Kuramatsu Murai	Consul-General	Left calf injured
Tomono Mori	Secretary-General of the Japanese Residents' Association of Shanghai	Injured
Mr. Kawaguchi	A newspaper photographer from the Osaka Mainichi	Slightly wounded by splinters
Unnamed sailor		Minor injuries

=== Arrests and investigation ===
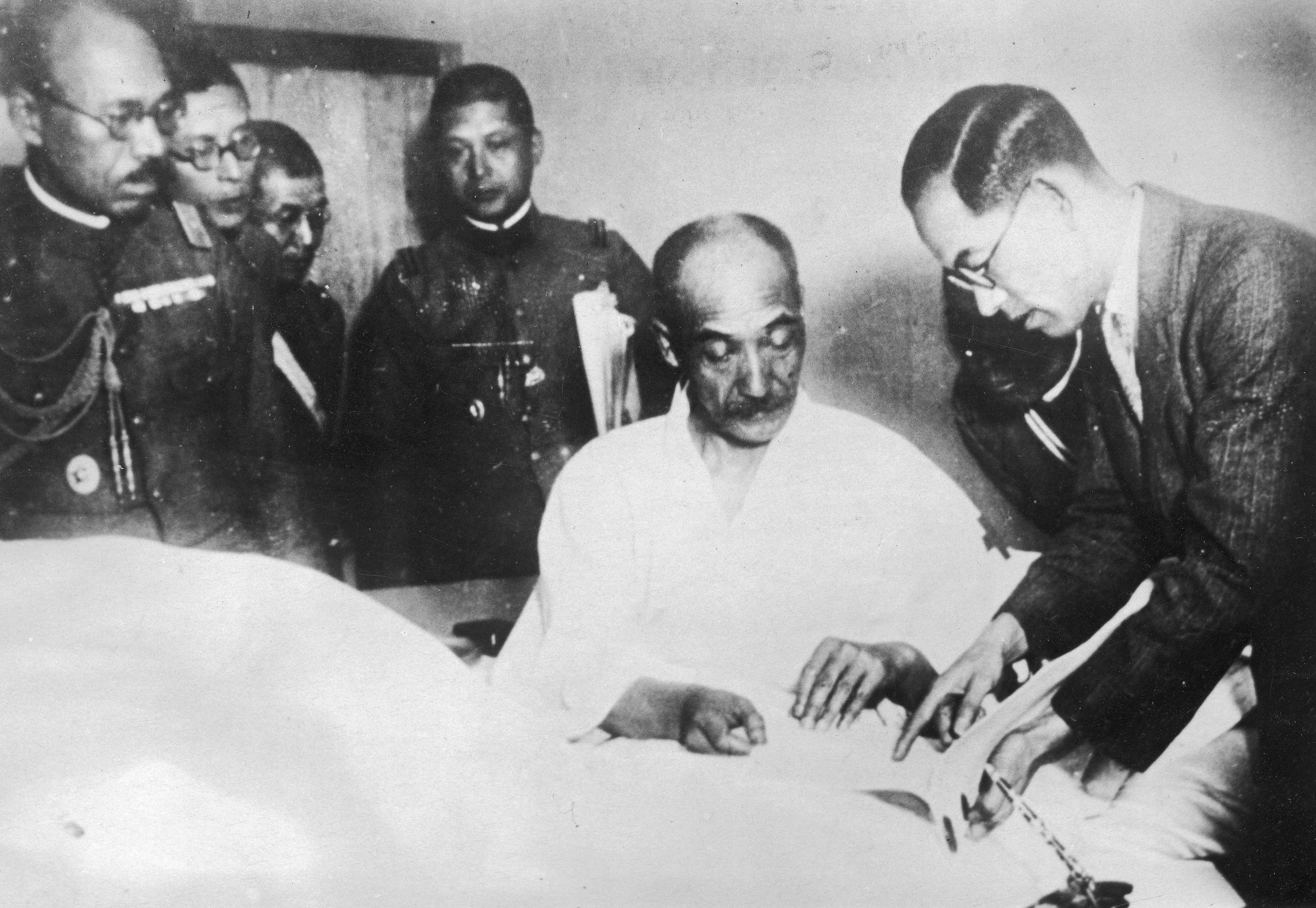
General Kenkichi Ueda signing the Shanghai ceasefire agreement at a Japanese army hospital where he was hospitalized due to injuries.

Yun dropped a second improvized bomb (Note: The second bomb was described as an 8x3x2 inch tin box filled with nitroglycerin.) nearby with the intent to kill himself. However, it failed to go off. The crowd reportedly mobbed and attempted to lynch Yun, but the military police pulled him away, bruised and bleeding. According to an eyewitness, Yun grinned defiantly during his arrest. Yun was sentenced to death at a military trial on May 25. He was transferred to Japan in November, and executed by firing squad on December 19.

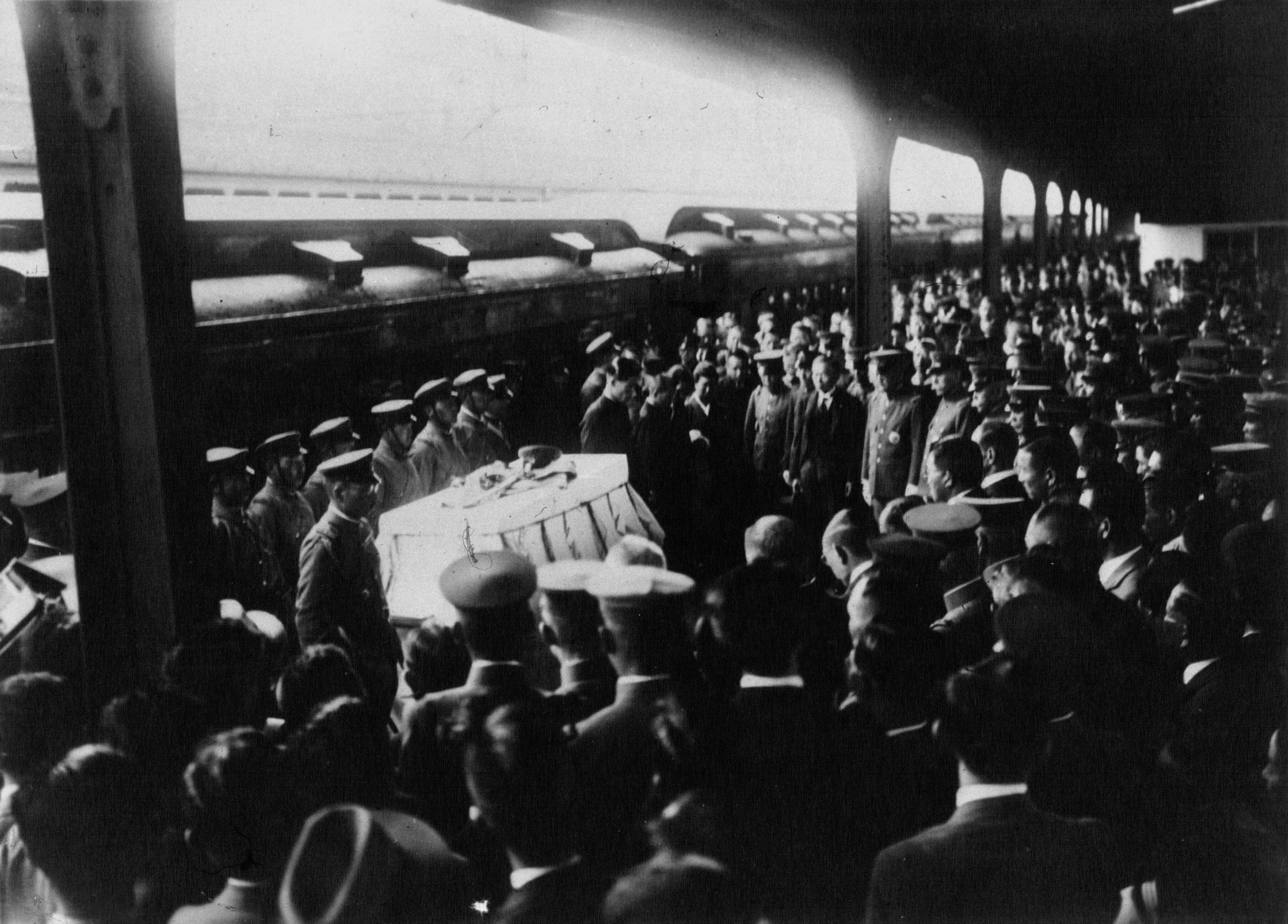
Japanese crowds receiving General Shirakawa's coffin upon its arrival at Yokosuka Station, on 31 May 1932.

Shortly after the attack, the military secured the perimeter, and did not permit anyone to leave until they were searched. Several Chinese people were arrested, although they were later released. A Chinese person managed to escape the park and sought refuge in the house of W. S. Hibbard, an American park-keeper. Japanese troops surrounded Hibbard's house, extracted the Chinese man, and kept Hibbard in detention.

What followed was a vigorous search for anyone involved in the attack. Members of the KPG went into hiding. Kim Ku and three others hid at the house of American Presbyterian missionary George Ashmore Fitch, who was sympathetic to the Korean and Chinese resistance against Japan. Kim eventually managed to escape arrest, and lived to see the liberation of Korea in 1945.

A day later, it was reported that Yun was believed to be connected with a Korean organization called the South China Young Men's Association. French police raided a number of Korean associations in the French Concession of the city to discover more connections to the attack. On May 2, the North China Daily News reported that the Japanese military had declared martial law in the Wusong area of Shanghai, and that officers were conducting random searches throughout the city. (Note: It also reported that it received a tip that Korean communists were behind the attack. A statement from Kim Ku later denied that Yun was a communist, although the Japanese and French were skeptical of this.) It also reported that over ten raids by the French and Japanese police, nineteen other Koreans and a Chinese "coolie" had been arrested. More raids were expected to follow. Based on an alleged testimony from Yun, they believed that a man with the pseudonym "Li Chun-shan" or "Li Yue-pei" had paid Yun $200 and given him two bombs for the attack, and was still at large. They also alleged that Li was the head of a "Korean Independence League". It also reported that the Japanese believed the prominent Korean independence activist Ahn Changho was not connected to the attack, as he had been arrested a week before the attack had occurred.

To avoid putting other Koreans at risk, Kim Ku sent out public statements to newspapers in Shanghai claiming responsibility for the attack. The North China Daily News announced on May 5 that it had received such a statement, and that the statement argued that the Japanese and French police were conducting raids in a manner that violated international law. In particular, they were accused of making arrests and searching people without a warrant. The Daily News disagreed with the assessment. Others also accused the police similarly, including a number of Koreans and the Shanghai Chinese Bar Association. The police denied these accusations.

== Reactions ==
The attack was covered prominently in several Western media sources. Some of the reported information was incorrect; the Sydney Morning Herald published an article on 30 April that claimed Yun threw a hand grenade and was beaten to death by the crowd. The New York Times reported Yun's name as "Kim Fung-kee".

United States officials reacted negatively to the event. Acting Secretary of State William R. Castle communicated "the sympathy of the government of the United States for the unfortunate victims".

Syngman Rhee, the former President of the KPG who left for the United States after being impeached, expressed disapproval of the KPG's militant activities. He felt that this would only tighten Japan's grip on Korea.
