= Koa Kannon =

Japanese Buddhist statue

Coordinates: 35°07′07″N 139°05′32″E

- 興亜観音 (Japanese)
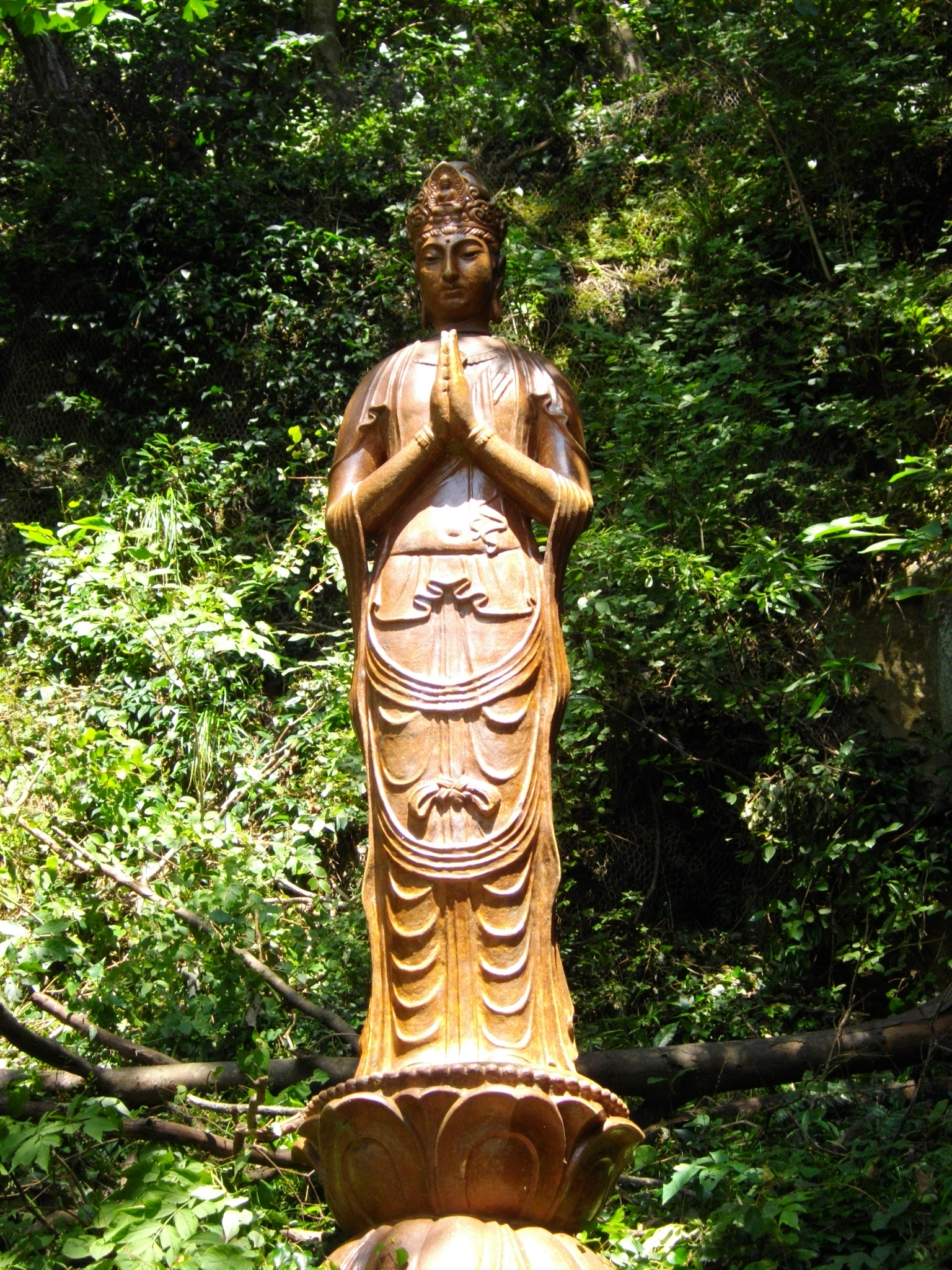
- Artist: Iwane Matsui
- Year: 1940
- Medium: Clay
- Subject: Kannon
- Location: Mount Izu

Koa Kannon

Japanese name
- Kana: こうあかんのん
- Kyūjitai: 興亞觀音
- Shinjitai: 興亜観音
Transcriptions
- Revised Hepburn: Kōa kannon

The Koa Kannon (興亜観音, Kōa Kannon, literally the “Raising Asia Kannon”) is a statue of Kannon, the bodhisattva of compassion, located atop Mount Izu in Atami, Shizuoka Prefecture, as well as to the temple, formally a religious corporation called the Reihaizan Koa Kannon, which is dedicated to it. Koa Kannon is from the same lineage as the Hokke Shu Jin-Monryu, a breakaway sect of Nichiren Buddhism based in Sanjo in Niigata Prefecture, but it is not formally affiliated with them and is the only independent Buddhist temple in Japan with its own unique history and rites. The temple admits all worshipers regardless of their religion.

The temple is dedicated to all those who died in combat in the Second Sino-Japanese War but is especially known for interring the ashes of seven individuals executed as war criminals at a stone monument dedicated to the “seven warriors”.

The current head priest is Sister Myojo Itami who is the third daughter of the first head priest Master Ninrei Itami and is a registered nun of Hokke Shu Jin-Monryu. Yasuaki Itami, the adopted son of Ninrei’s eldest daughter, now hospitalized former head priest Myotoku Itami, assists Myojo and is in charge of the temple’s administrative affairs. He is a priest of the Soto school.

== History ==
=== Origin of the Koa Kannon statue ===
General Iwane Matsui who commanded the Shanghai Expeditionary Force at the outbreak of the Second Sino-Japanese War built the Koa Kannon statue after retiring from the service in 1940 to honor the officers and men of both China and Japan who fell in battle in the name of consecrating equally both friend and enemy. The statue was made using clay from battlefields, including from the vicinity of Nanjing where Matsui served. On 24 February 1940 the consecration ceremony was performed in the presence of Tessui Oshima, a high-ranking Jodo Buddhist monk from Zojo-ji, and other distinguished figures. Then Matsui moved into a retreat he built nearby and he used to ascend the mountain every morning to give the kannon sutra.

In 1944 another monument was erected called the “Bodhi for the Warriors Who Fell in Battle in the Great Pacific War” which honors all the war dead in the Pacific theater.

=== Enshrinement of war criminals ===
On 23 December 1948, six men including Hideki Tojo were executed by the International Military Tribunal of the Far East as “Class A” war criminals alongside Iwane Matsui, and were cremated at Kuboyama Crematorium in Yokohama. The American army disposed of most of the ashes, but one urn was secretly collected up by a group including Miyoshi Tobita, the manager of Kuboyama Crematorium, and Shohei Sanmonji, defense counsel to Kuniaki Koiso, and on 3 May 1949 this urn was carried to the Koa Kannon temple due to its links with Matsui. Right away the head priest Master Ninrei Itami intuitively understood that these were the ashes of the seven war criminals and hid them until he thought the time was right. Finally on 19 April 1959 the stone monument of the seven warriors was erected, with the inscription written personally by former prime minister Shigeru Yoshida, and the ashes were buried underneath it. However, in 1960 one incense container of these ashes was taken to be buried separately at the “Tomb of the Seven Warriors Who Died for their Country” located on Mount Sangane at Nishio, then part of Hazu District, in Aichi Prefecture.

In addition to the stone monument of the seven warriors and the Bodhi monument put up in 1944, at the same site there is now also the “Memorial Stone of the 1,068 Executed Martyrs of the Great Pacific War”, which enshrines Class B and C war criminals who were executed or died in prison and has been likened to a “little Yasukuni Shrine”.

=== 1971 bombing ===
On 12 December 1971 the East Asia Anti-Japan Armed Front, an extremist group, tried to blow up the statue of the Koa Kannon, the stone monument of the seven warriors, and the Memorial Stone of the 1,068 Executed Martyrs of the Great Pacific War, which they viewed as symbols of Japanese imperialism. The stone monument of the seven warriors was destroyed but because the fuse was short the other two escaped destruction. The monument which was destroyed was restored afterwards by volunteers.

== Support ==
Unlike a typical temple, Koa Kannon has no graves and thus no patrons under the danka system except for the surviving family of the seven war criminals. Koa Kannon is always requesting general help since the only thing maintaining the temple is offering money from visitors, volunteers, and members of support groups. One such association is the Koa Kannon Support Group, which was founded in 1942 by its first president Iwane Matsui and is preserved primarily by local devotees in Atami.

There was in addition the Society to Protect the Koa Kannon which was established in 1994, but due to a scandal involving some of its board members it dissolved in March 2011.

== Directions ==
At JR Atami Station take the Izu Tokai Bus bound for Yugawara Station, get off at the “Koa Kannon” stop, and walk to the temple. At JR Yugawara Station there is also a bus going in the direction of Atami and Mount Izu.

== See also ==
- Iwane Matsui
- Yasukuni Shrine
