= Tenth Army (Japan) =

Japanese Tenth Army
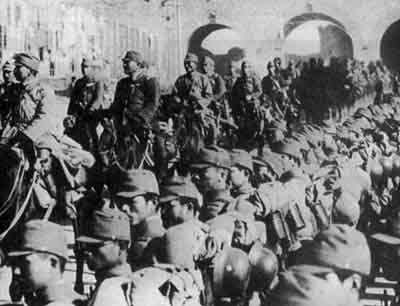
- Japanese troops enter Nanjing
- Active: October 20, 1937 - February 14, 1938
- Country: Empire of Japan
- Branch: Imperial Japanese Army
- Type: Infantry
- Role: Corps
- Garrison/HQ: Shanghai
- Engagements: Battle of Nanjing

The Japanese 10th Army (第10軍, Dai-jyū gun) was an army of the Imperial Japanese Army during the Second Sino-Japanese War.

== History ==
The Japanese 10th Army was formed on October 20, 1937 under the Imperial General Headquarters, and came under the control of the Japanese Central China Area Army on November 7 of the same year. It was an emergency reinforcement force to supplement the Japanese Shanghai Expeditionary Army in China after the Second Shanghai Incident. The Japanese 10th Army subsequently participated in the Battle of Nanjing and the subsequent atrocities known as the Nanking Massacre. The unit was officially disbanded in Nanjing on February 14, 1938.

== List of Commanders ==
	Name	From	To
Commanding officer	General Heisuke Yanagawa	20 October 1937	14 February 1939
Chief of staff	Major General Moritake Tanabe	20 October 1937	14 February 1939
