= Central China Area Army =

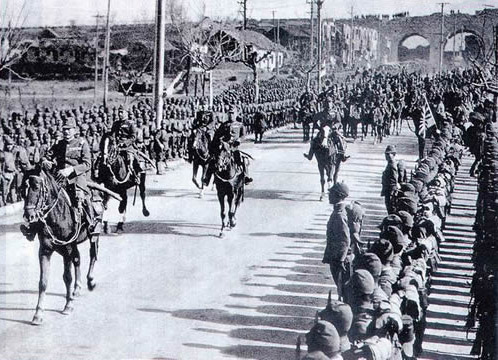
- General Matsui enters Nanjing
- Active: November 7, 1937 – February 14, 1938
- Country: Empire of Japan
- Allegiance: Emperor of Japan
- Branch: Imperial Japanese Army
- Type: Area Army
- Garrison/HQ: Shanghai
- Engagements: Second Sino-Japanese War: Battle of Nanjing; Nanjing Massacre

The Central China Area Army (中支那方面軍, Naka Shina hōmen gun) was an area army of the Imperial Japanese Army during the Second Sino-Japanese War.

== History ==
On November 7, 1937 Japanese Central China Area Army (CCAA) was organized as a reinforcement expeditionary army by combining the Shanghai Expeditionary Army (SEF) and the IJA Tenth Army. General Iwane Matsui was appointed as its commander-in-chief, concurrent with his assignment as commander-in-chief of the SEF. Matsui reported directly to Imperial General Headquarters. After the Battle of Nanjing in December 1937, CCAA forces perpetrated the Nanjing Massacre, in which an estimated 200,000 people were brutally murdered. The CCAA was disbanded on February 14, 1938 and its component units were reassigned to the Central China Expeditionary Army.

== List of Commanders ==
=== Commanding officer ===
	Name	From	To
1	General Iwane Matsui	30 October 1937	14 February 1938

=== Chief of Staff ===
	Name	From	To
1	Major General Osamu Tsukada	2 November 1937	14 February 1938
