= Yun Bong-gil =

Korean independence activist (1908–1932)

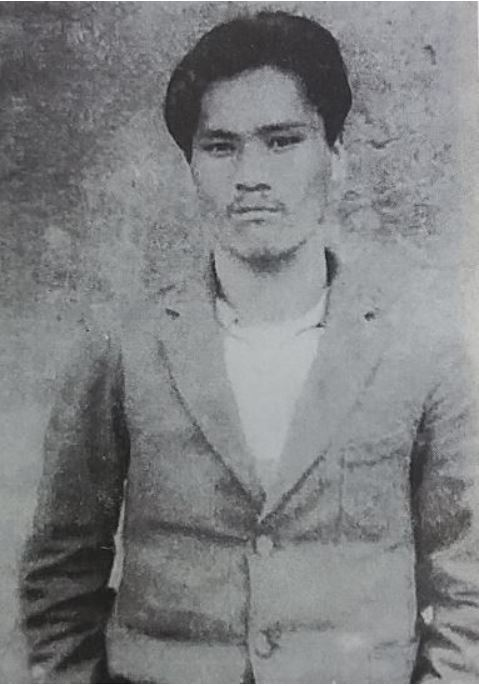
- Yun in 1932
- Born: 21 June 1908; Yesan County, South Ch'ungch'ong Province, Korean Empire
- Died: 19 December 1932 (aged 24); Kanazawa, Ishikawa Prefecture, Empire of Japan
- Cause of death: Execution by firing squad
- Burial place: Hyochang Park (1946–); Nodayama Cemetery (1932–1946)
- Awards: Order of Merit for National Foundation

Korean name
- Hangul: 윤봉길
- Hanja: 尹奉吉
- RR: Yun Bonggil
- MR: Yun Ponggil

Art name
- Hangul: 매헌
- Hanja: 梅軒
- RR: Maeheon
- MR: Maehŏn

Yun Bong-gil (Korean: 윤봉길; Hanja: 尹奉吉; 21 June 1908 – 19 December 1932) was a Korean independence activist. His art name is Maeheon (매헌). He is most notable for his role in the Hongkou Park Incident, in which he set off a bomb that killed two Japanese colonial government and army officials in Shanghai's Hongkou Park (now Lu Xun Park) in 1932. He was posthumously awarded the Republic of Korea Medal of Order of Merit for National Foundation in 1962 by the South Korean government.

Yun Bong-gil memorials were built in South Korea (Seoul and Yesan), China (Shanghai), and Japan (Kanazawa).

== Early life ==
Yun Bong-gil was born in June 1908, in Yesan County, South Chungcheong Province, Korean Empire. He enrolled in Deoksan Elementary School in 1918, but the following year he dropped out after refusing colonial education. Also he studied in Ochi Seosuk (a village school that taught Korean and Chinese). As Korea had been made a protectorate within the Japanese empire in 1905, Yun grew up in a troubled country. Local resistance grew considerably with the annexation of Korea in 1910. It culminated in the March 1 Movement in 1919 that was aggressively crushed by the Japanese authorities (hundreds of protesters were massacred by the Japanese police force and army). The brutal repression that followed made many activists flee into China. In 1921, Yun began studying mathematics.

By 1926 Yun had become an independence activist, starting evening classes in his home town to help educate people from rural communities about the issues. At the age of 20, he had organized a reading club and published several pamphlets.

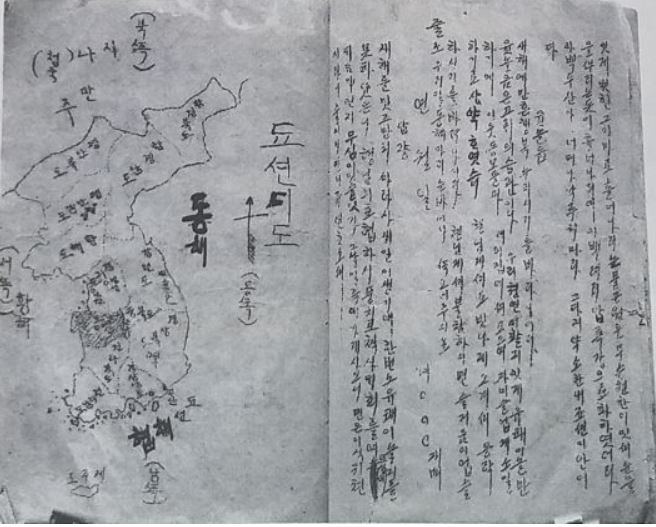
Farmers Readers, the textbook written by Yun for rural education

In 1928, he had become involved in several rural social movements, which were known as "farmers' enlightenment and reading societies". Yun wrote a textbook called Farmers Readers. It was used at evening classes to teach literacy to poor young adults who could not attend school in rural areas. He also founded a group called "Re-invigoration" to promote the revival of farming villages. After successfully organizing a well-attended rural cultural festival in which he performed a sketch entitled "The Rabbit and the Fox", he came to the attention of the Tokubetsu Kōtō Keisatsu, the Japanese Secret police in Korea tasked with investigating people and political groups that might threaten the Empire of Japan.

Despite the surveillance, Yun continued his activities and was appointed chairman of a Farmers' Association. Promoted through the Suam Sports Council to improve the health of farmers, he also created rural sports clubs because he believed that rural development and the spirit of national independence could be achieved through having a healthy mind and body. In the 1930s, Yun decided to enter the independence movement in earnest and moved to Manchuria. At first, he tried to become an independent army, but at that time, Manchuria's independence forces were divided into several branches and suffered a period of stagnation. In response, Yun went to Shanghai, where the Provisional Government of the Republic of Korea is located.

== China ==
After being briefly arrested and sent to prison, Yun fled to Manchuria. In a letter he left behind he wrote: "I will not return home alive with the belief that I must die for my country and do something big". In China he met fellow activists Kim Tae-sik and Han Il-jin from the Korean independence movement.

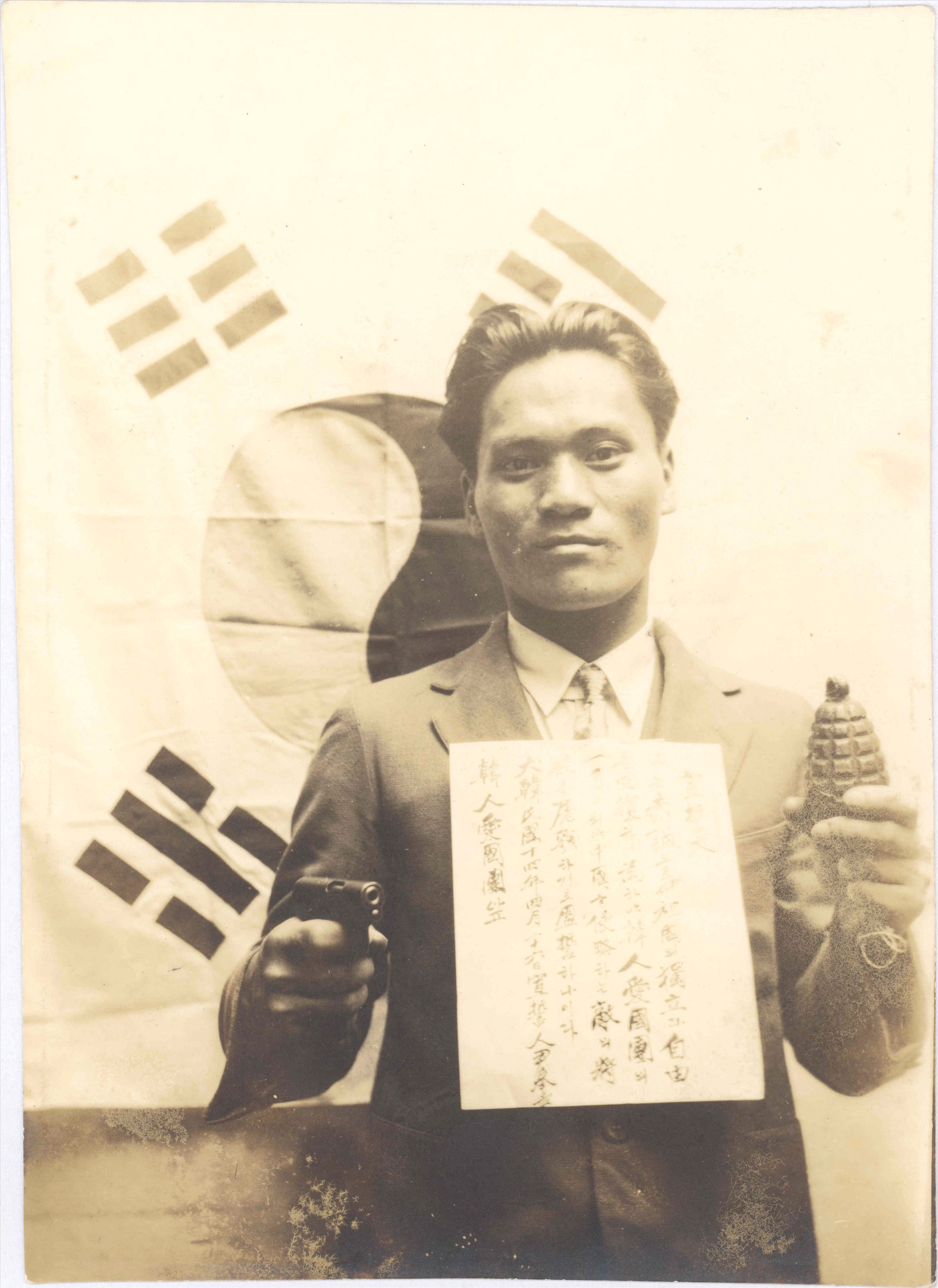
Yun Bong-gil with the pledge he made to the Korean Patriotic Corps pinned to his chest.

Yun headed for Shanghai, judging that he would be able to push for a successful independence movement only if he went directly to the Provisional Government of the Republic of Korea. He travelled alone through Dalian, south of the Liaodong Peninsula, to Qingdao, Shandong Province where he worked at a factory run by Park Jin, a Korean businessman, to save money. In August 1931, he finally arrived in Shanghai and stayed at the home of An Jung-geun in the French quarter. Yun also studied English at the Shanghai English School. He visited Kim Ku, the leader of Korea's government-in-exile pledging to work for the independence of Korea.

The pledge he made read as follows:

I make this oath as a member of Korean Patriotic Association to kill the military leaders of the enemy who are invading Korea in order to redeem the independence and freedom of our country.

== Hongkou Park Incident ==
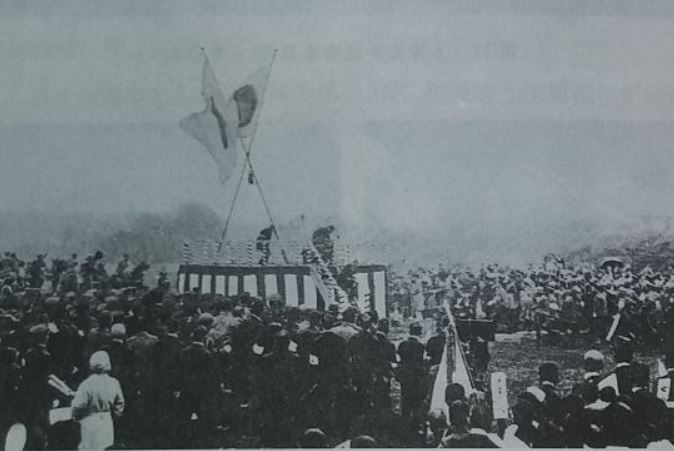
Hongkou Park after the bombing on 29 April 1932.

On January 28, 1932, the Japanese army launched an attack on the Chinese National Revolutionary Army's 19th Route Army stationed in Zhabei, Shanghai. After more than a month of resistance, the Chinese forces gradually lost ground and eventually abandoned their positions in Jiangwan and Zhabei, retreating across the entire front. On March 3, after the Japanese occupied Zhenru and Nanxiang, they declared a ceasefire. Subsequently, with the mediation of Britain, the United States, France, and Italy, both sides began negotiations.

During the negotiations, Japanese military and political officials in Shanghai decided to take advantage of the celebration of "Tenchō Setsu" (the birthday of Emperor Shōwa) on April 29 to hold a "Victory Celebration of the Battle of Shanghai" at Hongkou Park, Shanghai..

Against this backdrop, Chen Mingshu, the acting Premier of the Executive Yuan of the Nationalist Government and Commander of the Shanghai Defense Force, along with others, decided to carry out an assassination to disrupt the Japanese celebration. Chen approached his friend Wang Yaqiao, known as the "King of Assassins," and shared this idea with him. Wang expressed his support. However, the Japanese, wary of potential threats, declared that "no Chinese would be allowed to attend the victory celebration," making it difficult to act.

Wang then suggested that the exiled Provisional Government of the Republic of Korea, based in Shanghai, be asked to send someone for the task. He contacted Ahn Chang-ho, the Minister of Internal Affairs of the Provisional Government, with whom he had a close relationship, and proposed the plan, offering a sum of 40,000 yuan for funding. Ahn Chang-ho subsequently met with Kim Gu, the Minister of Police of the Provisional Government of the Republic of Korea at the time. Kim agreed to take on the mission.

After accepting the mission, Kim Gu, learning from the failure of Lee Bong-chang's attempt to assassinate Emperor Hirohito during the Sakuradamon Incident, meticulously prepared the explosives. At the same time, Kim approached a young Korean exile in Shanghai, Yun Bong-gil, to carry out the assassination. Yun Bong-gil, who was fluent in Japanese and resolute in his determination, immediately agreed to undertake the mission. On April 26, Yun joined the Korean Patriotic Corps and took an oath under the Korean national flag, capturing the moment in a photograph.

On 29 April 1932, Yun took a bomb disguised as a water bottle to a celebration arranged by the Imperial Japanese Army (IJA) in honor of Emperor Hirohito's birthday at Hongkou Park. The bomb killed the government minister for Japanese residents in Shanghai, Kawabata Teiji, and mortally wounded General Yoshinori Shirakawa, who died of his injuries on 26 May 1932. Among the seriously injured were Lieutenant General Kenkichi Ueda, the commander of the 9th Division of the Imperial Japanese Army, and Mamoru Shigemitsu, Japanese Envoy in Shanghai, who each lost a leg, and IJN Admiral Kichisaburō Nomura who lost an eye. The Japanese Consul-General in Shanghai, Kuramatsu Murai (村井倉松), was seriously injured in the head and body.

Yun then tried to kill himself by detonating a second bomb disguised in a bento box. It did not explode and he was arrested at the scene.

== Sentencing and execution ==
After being convicted by a Japanese military court in Shanghai on 25 May, he was transferred to Osaka prison on 18 November. He was then moved to Kanazawa, Ishikawa: the headquarters of the IJA's 9th Division. Yun was executed by firing squad on 19 December. His body was buried in Nodayama cemetery in Kanazawa, Japan then moved to Hyochang Park, Seoul in 1946 following Korea's independence from Japan.

== Legacy ==
The then-President of the Chinese Republic, Chiang Kai-shek of the Kuomintang government, praised Yun's actions, stating he was "a young Korean patriot who has accomplished something tens of thousands of Chinese soldiers could not do". However the future South Korean president, Syngman Rhee, disapproved of the incident and Kim Gu's strategy of assassinations as a means to achieve independence because the Japanese could use such attacks to justify their oppression in Korea.

=== Funeral and honours ===
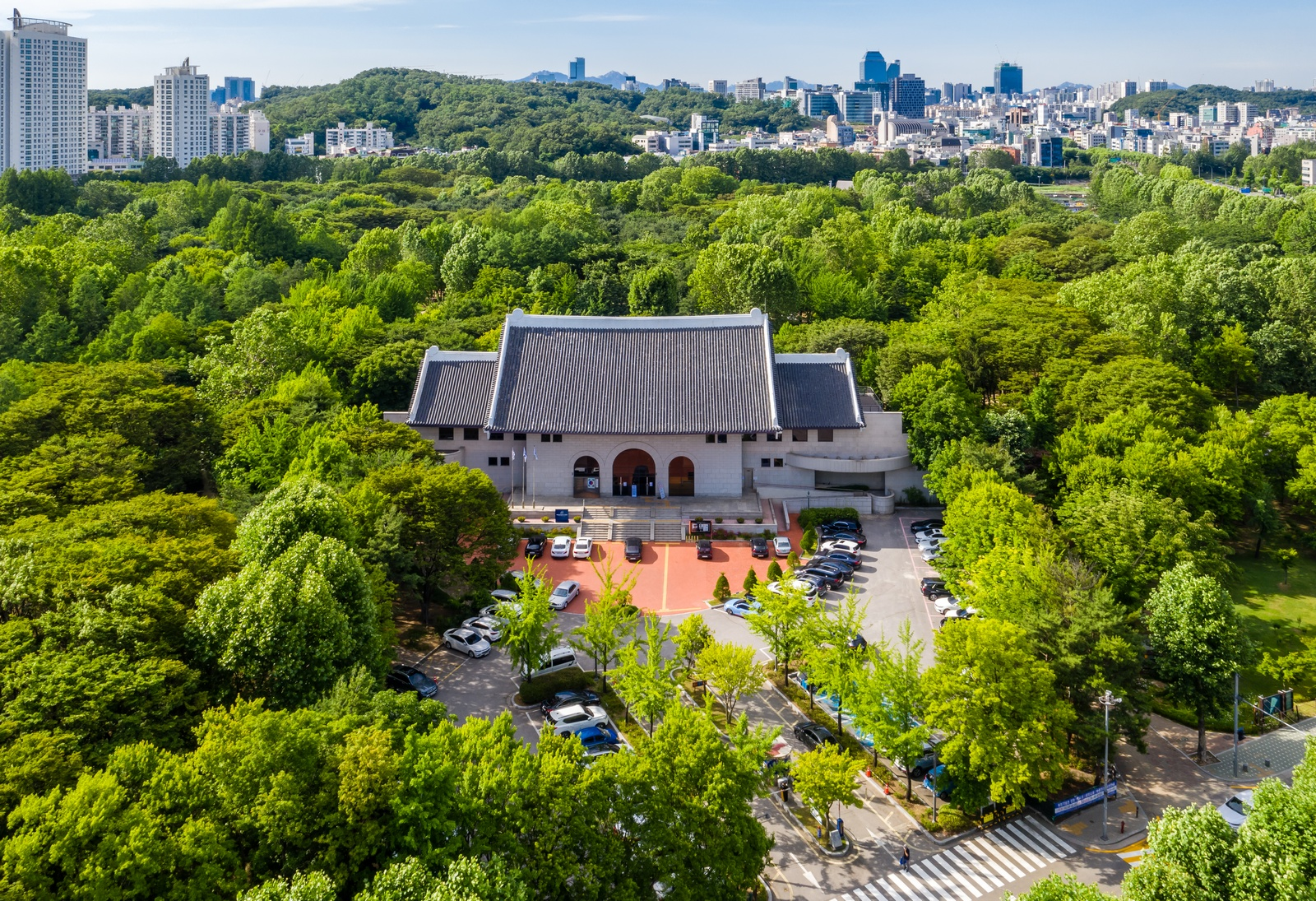
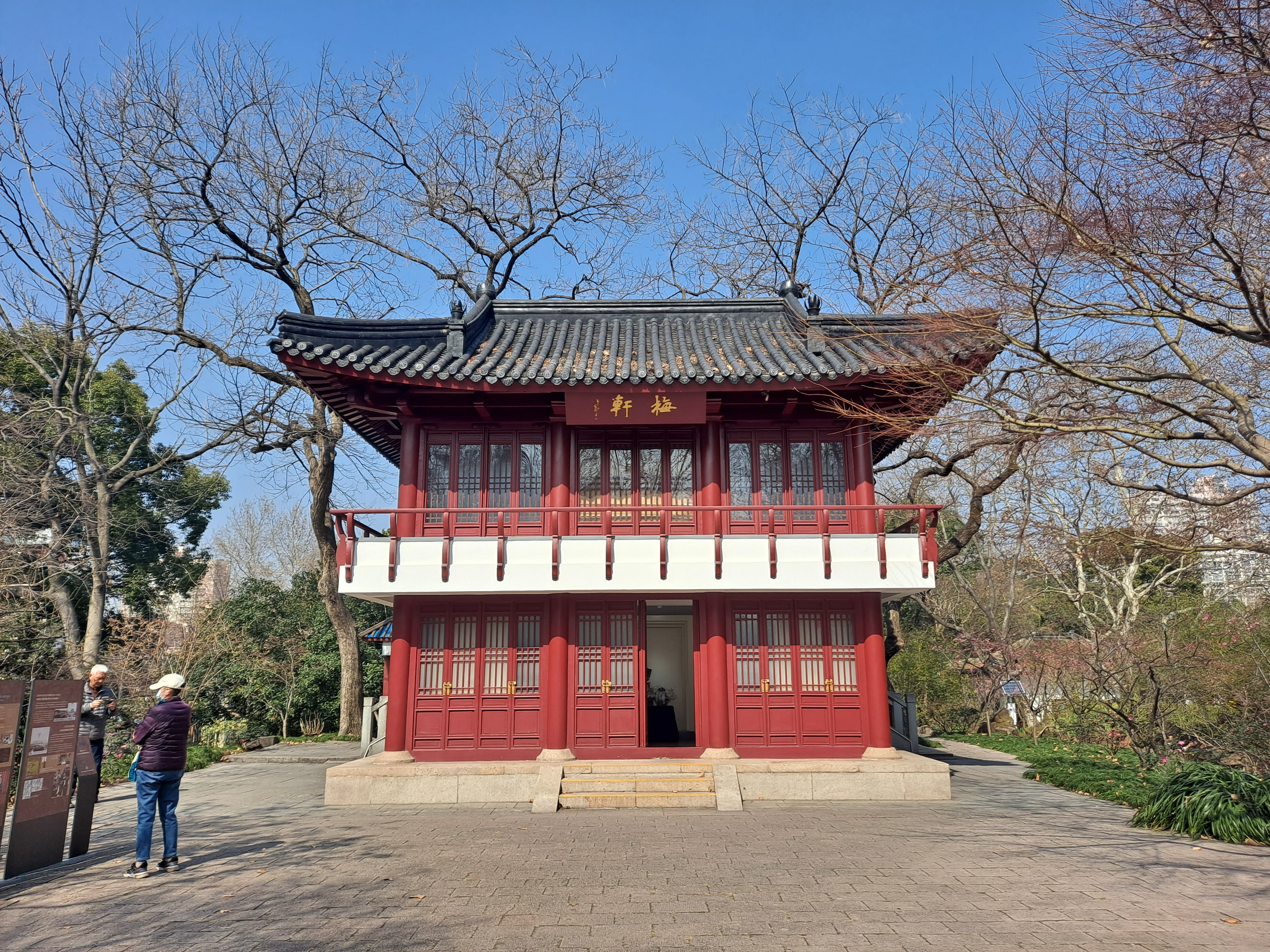
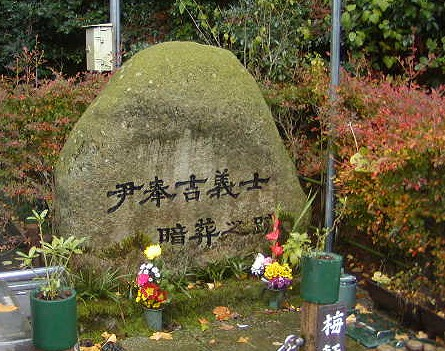
Memorials to Yun Bong-gil in South Korea (top), China (middle) and Japan (bottom)

In May 1946, Korean residents in Japan exhumed Yun's remains from Nodayama cemetery. After being transferred to Seoul, they were given Korean funeral rites and reburied in Hyochang Park.

On 1 March 1962, the South Korean government posthumously bestowed on him the Republic of Korea Cordon (the highest honor) of the Order of Merit for National Foundation.

On 27 March 1968, Chiang Kai-shek, the president of Republic of China in exile in Taiwan, wrote a prose tribute to applaud Yun's action at the request of Yun's biographer, which was not revealed until 18 Dec 2013.

=== Memorials ===
Yun Bong-gil Memorial Hall was built in commemoration of the 55th anniversary of his death. It is located in Yangjae Citizen's Forest, Seocho District, Seoul Yangjaedong. Second name of Yangjae Citizen's Forest Station is 'Maeheon' which is named after his pen name.

There is also a memorial hall called the Plum Pavilion in Lu Xun Park, Shanghai where the bomb throwing incident happened.

In Kanazawa, Ishikawa, Japan, a monument was built on the site where Yun Bong-gil was buried after being executed by the Imperial Japanese Army.

=== Modern re-evaluation ===
In South Korea, discussion on whether Yun's bombing attack in 1932 would have been considered terrorism in a modern context is a sensitive issue. In 2007, Anders Karlsson, a visiting Swedish scholar from SOAS, University of London, compared Yun Bong-gil and Kim Gu to terrorists in his lecture on Korean history. His comparison provoked strong criticism from the newspaper JoongAng Ilbo. Prof. Jeong Byeong-jun, interviewed by JoongAng Ilbo, dismissed Karlsson's description as the "view of Westerners". Later, he explained his purpose was to highlight "how the implications of the 'terrorism' have changed over the course of the past century". In 2013, Tessa Morris-Suzuki, an English historian and professor at Australian National University, concurred with Karlsson's explanation and wrote in her academic article, "If we accept the literal dictionary definition of the term terrorists as partisan, member of a resistance organization or guerrilla force using acts of violence then Yoo was self-evidently a terrorist."

On the other hand, at the "International Research Conference in Memory of the 70th Anniversary of Yun Bong-gil & Lee Bong-chang's Patriotic Acts", held on 29 April 2002 in Shanghai, some scholars present pointed out that Yun's patriotic acts have distinct differences from modern day terrorism, which targets civilians. Yun only attacked the Japanese top military and political officials attending the event, and no other civilians were hurt by the bombing. To protect civilians, Yun waited until all the diplomats had left the scene.

=== In popular culture ===
Yun is played by Lee Kang-min in the 2019 television series Different Dreams.

== See also ==
- Korea under Japanese rule
- Korean independence movement
- Lee Bong-chang
- Sakuradamon Incident (1932)
- Assassination attempts on Hirohito
