= Yoshinori Shirakawa =

Japanese general (1869–1932)

Junior Second Rank Baron Yoshinori Shirakawa
- 白川 義則
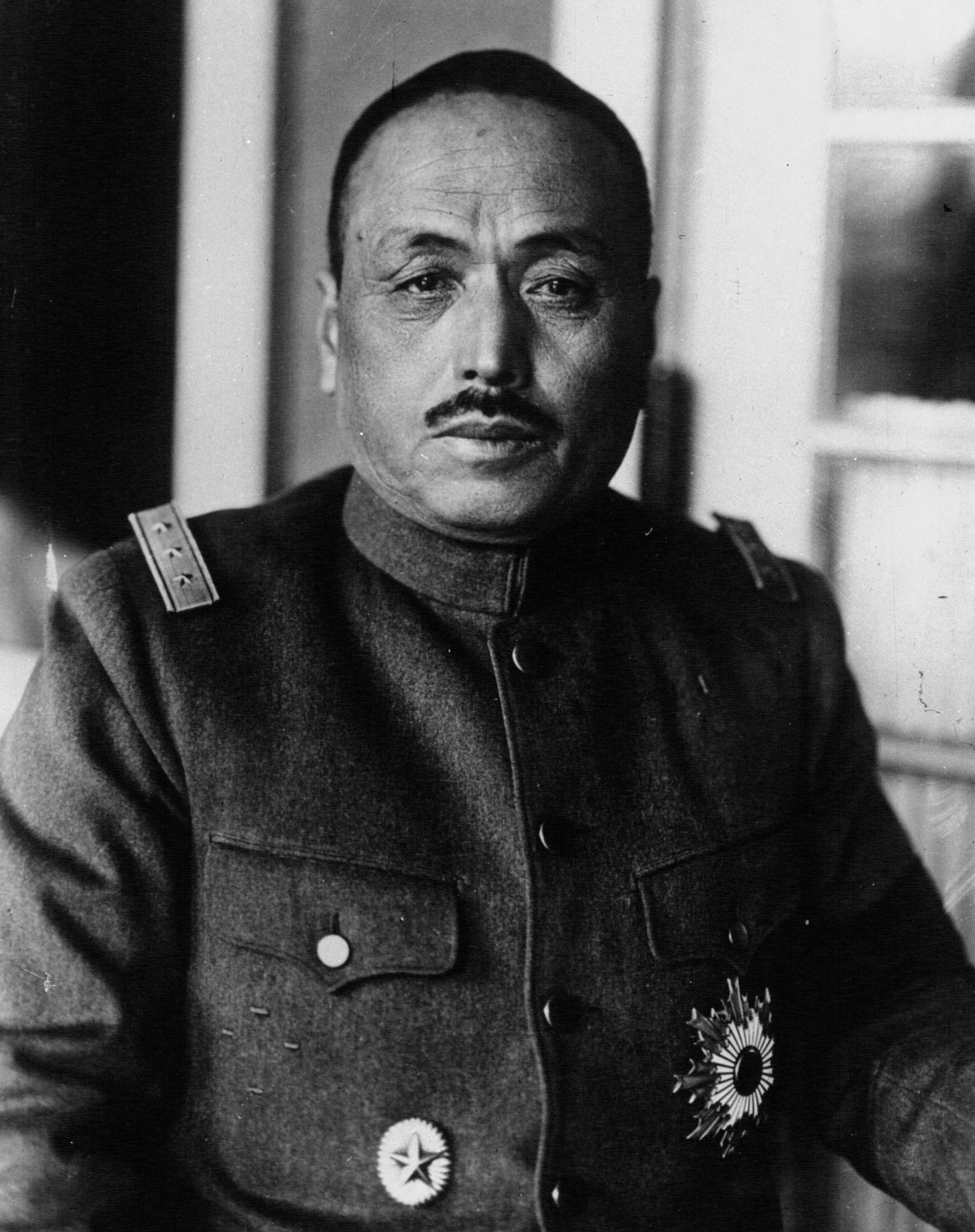
- Shirakawa c. 1932

Minister of the Army
- In office 20 April 1927 – 2 July 1929
- Prime Minister: Tanaka Giichi
- Preceded by: Kazushige Ugaki
- Succeeded by: Kazushige Ugaki

Personal details
- Born: 24 January 1869 Matsuyama, Iyo, Japan
- Died: 26 May 1932 (aged 63) Shanghai, China
- Awards: Order of the Rising Sun (1st class with Paulownia Blossoms, Grand Cordon); Order of the Golden Kite (2nd class)

Military service
- Allegiance: Empire of Japan
- Branch/service: Imperial Japanese Army
- Years of service: 1884–1932
- Rank: General
- Commands: 11th Infantry Division; 1st Infantry Division; Kwantung Army; Shanghai Expeditionary Army
- Battles/wars: First Sino-Japanese War; Russo-Japanese War; World War I January 28 incident

Baron Yoshinori Shirakawa (白川 義則, Shirakawa Yoshinori; 24 January 1869 – 26 May 1932) was a general in the Imperial Japanese Army. He died from injuries caused by a bomb set by Korean independence activist Yun Bong-gil in Shanghai.

== Early life and education ==
Shirakawa was born as the third son of an ex-samurai of Matsuyama Domain in Shikoku. He attended Matsuyama Middle School, but was forced to leave without graduating due to the difficult financial situation of his family, and worked as a substitute teacher. In January 1886, he secured a position with a military cadet school and was enlisted in the Imperial Japanese Army as a sergeant in military engineering attached to the Guards Infantry Regiment. In December 1887 he was recommended as an officer cadet and served with the IJA 21st Infantry Regiment. He graduated from the 1st class of the Imperial Japanese Army Academy in 1890, where his classmates included Kazushige Ugaki. He was commissioned as a second lieutenant in March 1891.

== Military career ==
Shirakawa entered the Army Staff College in 1893, but was forced to leave the following year due to the outbreak of the First Sino-Japanese War. During the war, he was promoted to first lieutenant. He returned to graduate from the Army Staff College and was promoted to captain in 1898. Shirakawa was then assigned as section commander of the IJA 21st Infantry Regiment. In 1902, he was assigned to the staff of the Guards Division.

Promoted to major in 1903, Shirakawa returned to command the IJA 21st Infantry Regiment during the Russo-Japanese War. During the war, he was transferred to the staff of the IJA 13th Division. This division was given the independent assignment of occupying Sakhalin before the conclusion of the Portsmouth Treaty, landing on Sakhalin on 7 July 1905, only three months after being formed, and securing the island by 1 August 1905. As a result of its successful operation, Japan was awarded southern Karafuto during the Portsmouth Treaty, one of Japan's few territorial gains during the war. After the war, Shirakawa was assigned to the Personnel Bureau of the Army Ministry from October 1905. He was promoted to lieutenant colonel in 1907, colonel in 1909, and commander of the IJA 34th Infantry Regiment.

In June 1911, Shirakawa became Chief of Staff of the IJA 11th Division, and was promoted to major general and commander of the IJA 9th Infantry Brigade.He served as Head of the Personnel Bureau from 1916 to 1919, and after his promotion to lieutenant general and commandant of the Imperial Japanese Army Academy.

In March 1921, he was given a combat command again, as commander of the IJA 11th Division, overseeing its withdrawal and return to Japan after the Japanese intervention in Siberia. In August 1922, he was transferred to command the IJA 1st Division. He was selected by General Yamanashi Hanzō to serve as Vice-Minister of the Army in October 1922 and also served as Head of Army Aeronautical Department. during which time he was awarded the Grand Cordon of the Order of the Rising Sun. Shirakawa was appointed commander of the Kwantung Army from October 1923.

== Army Minister and death ==
Promoted to full general in March 1925, Shirakawa subsequently served on the Supreme War Council from 1926 to 1932, and was Army Minister from 1927 to 1929 in the cabinet of Prime Minister Tanaka Giichi.

During his tenure as Army Minister, Kwantung Army officers led by Daisaku Kōmoto staged the Huanggutun incident where they organised the assassination of Fengtian warlord Zhang Zuolin in June 1928. Prime Minister Tanaka reported to Emperor Hirohito that the incident had been staged by rogue officers within the army without orders from Tokyo and demanded that the perpetrators be punished. Shirakawa refused to punish the perpetrators and instead transferred them to other posts to avoid a court martial.

In January 1932, the Shanghai Incident caused tensions between Japan and China to rapidly escalate towards open war. Shirakawa was dispatched to China on 25 February 1932, to become commander of the Shanghai Expeditionary Army. He was under direct orders from Emperor Hirohito to bring the situation to a close. Shirakawa issued a cease-fire order on 3 March over the strong objections of his commanders and greatly angering the General Staff. However, the emperor was pleased, and the League of Nations General Assembly, which was poised to issue a strong condemnation of Japan, remained silent. However, two months later, on 29 April 1932, he was severely injured by a bomb set by Korean independence activist Yoon Bong-gil in Shanghai's Hongkou Park and died of his injuries on 26 May.

== Legacy ==
Shirakawa was posthumously awarded with the Grand Cordon of the Order of the Paulownia Flowers, Order of the Golden Kite 2nd Class, and elevated to the rank of danshaku (baron) under the kazoku peerage system. His ashes were divided between graves located in his hometown of Matsuyama and in Tokyo's Aoyama Cemetery.

== Honours ==
Peerages and titles

- Baron (23 May 1932)

Court ranks

- Senior Eighth Rank (3 February 1892)
- Junior Seventh Rank (10 October 1894)
- Senior Seventh Rank (16 April 1898)
- Junior Sixth Rank (10 July 1903)
- Senior Sixth Rank (20 May 1907)
- Junior Fifth Rank (21 February 1910)
- Senior Fifth Rank (20 March 1915)
- Junior Fourth Rank (28 February 1919)
- Senior Fourth Rank (30 March 1921)
- Junior Third Rank (15 May 1924)
- Senior Third Rank (1 June 1927)
- Junior Second Rank (26 May 1932; posthumous)

Orders and medals

Year awarded	Ribbon	Decoration	Notes
18 November 1895		First Sino-Japanese War Medal	
28 November 1895		Order of the Rising Sun, 6th class	
29 November 1902		Order of the Sacred Treasure, 5th class	
1 April 1906		Order of the Rising Sun, 4th class	
1 April 1906		Order of the Golden Kite, 3rd class	
1 April 1906		Russo-Japanese War Medal	
1 August 1912		Korean Annexation Commemorative Medal	
16 May 1914		Order of the Sacred Treasure, 3rd class	
7 November 1915		First World War Medal (1914–1915)	
10 November 1915		Emperor Taishō Enthronement Commemorative Medal	
30 January 1920		Order of the Sacred Treasure, 2nd class	
1 November 1920		Order of the Rising Sun, 2nd class	
1 November 1920		First World War Medal (1914–1920)	
1 November 1920		First World War Victory Medal	
1 November 1922		Grand Cordon of the Order of the Rising Sun	
5 December 1930		Imperial Capital Rehabilitation Commemorative Medal	
26 May 1932		Grand Cordon of the Order of the Paulownia Flowers	(posthumous)
26 May 1932		Order of the Golden Kite, 2nd class	(posthumous)
26 May 1932		China Incident War Medal (1931–1934)	(posthumous)

Permission to wear foreign decorations

Year awarded	Country	Ribbon	Decoration	Notes
2 December 1915	Republic of China		Order of the Precious Brilliant Golden Grain, 2nd Class	
25 May 1922	Kingdom of Romania		Order of the Crown of Romania, Grand Cross	
26 July 1928	Republic of China		Order of the Striped Tiger, 1st class	
29 March 1929	French Republic		Grand Officer of the Legion d'Honneur	
3 June 1929	United Kingdom		Knight Grand Cross of the Royal Victorian Order (GCVO)	
9 October 1930	Republic of Poland		Order of Polonia Restituta, Grand Cross	

== Notes ==
Political offices
Preceded by Kazushige Ugaki	Minister of War; April 1927 – July 1929	Succeeded by Kazushige Ugaki
Military offices
Preceded by none	Commander, Shanghai Expeditionary Army; February 1932 – April 1932	Succeeded by Nobuyoshi Mutō
Preceded by Shinobu Ono	Commander, Kwantung Army; October 1923 – July 1926	Succeeded by Nobuyoshi Mutō
