= Shanghai Expeditionary Army =

Japanese army, first raised in 1932

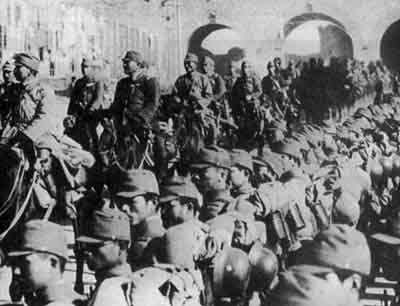
- Japanese troops enter Nanjing
- Active: 1932, 1937–1938
- Country: Empire of Japan
- Branch: Imperial Japanese Army
- Type: Infantry
- Role: Combined arms Expeditionary warfare
- Size: Corps
- Garrison/HQ: Nanjing
- Engagements: Battle of Shanghai, Battle of Nanjing

The Shanghai Expeditionary Army (上海派遣軍, Shanhai-haken-gun) was an expeditionary army corps level ad hoc Japanese army in the Second Sino-Japanese War.

The Shanghai Expeditionary Army was first raised on February 25, 1932 as a reinforcement for Japanese forces involved during the First Battle of Shanghai. It was dissolved in June 1932, after the conclusion of that incident. Japanese soldiers from the Taiwan Army were part of this army, and they were led by Iwane Matsui.

The Shanghai Expeditionary Army was raised a second time on August 15, 1937 on the eruption of full scale hostilities between the Empire of Japan and the Republic of China. Its forces participated in the Second Battle of Shanghai, and the subsequent drive inland to the Battle of Nanking. Troops from this army were also involved in the subsequent Nanjing Massacre.

The Shanghai Expeditionary Army was disbanded on February 1, 1938, and its component units were incorporated into the Central China Area Army.

== Organization 1932 ==
See: Order of Battle January 28 Incident

== Organization 1937-1938 ==
See: Order of battle of the Battle of Shanghai

== List of commanders ==
=== Commanding officer ===
	Name	From	To
1	General Yoshinori Shirakawa	25 February 1932	26 May 1932
X	Disbanded		
2	General Iwane Matsui	15 August 1937	2 December 1937
3	Lieutenant General Prince Asaka Yasuhiko	2 December 1937	14 February 1938

=== Chief of Staff ===
	Name	From	To
1	Lieutenant General Kanichiro Tashiro	26 February 1932	27 June 1932
X	Disbanded		
2	Lieutenant General Mamoru Iinuma	15 August 1937	14 February 1938
