= Central Hubei Operation (November 1940) order of battle =

Order of battle for the Central Hubei Operation (November 25–30, 1940), a battle of the Second Sino-Japanese War.

== Japan ==
11th Army – Lt. General Waichiro Sonobe

- Kayashima Force – Lt. Gen Takashi Kayashima 1939–1941 at Dangyang
  - 18th Independent Mixed Brigade – Lt. Gen Taka Kayashima 1939–1941
    - 92nd Independent infantry battalion
    - 93rd Independent infantry battalion
    - 94th Independent infantry battalion
    - 95th Independent infantry battalion
    - 96th independent infantry battalion
    - artillery troops
    - labor troops
    - signal communication unit.
  - Elements of the 40th Division Lt-General Naojiro Amaya, Manchuria 10/2/39 – 8/25/1941
    - 40th Infantry Brigade group:
      - 234th Infantry regiment
      - 235th Infantry regiment
      - 236th Infantry regiment
    - 40th Cavalry regiment
    - 40th mountain artillery regiment
    - 40th military engineer regiment
    - 40th Transport regiment
- Murakami Force – Lt. Gen Keisaku Murakami at Jingmen
  - 39th Division – - Lt. Gen Keisaku Murakami
    - 39th Infantry Brigade Group
      - 231st Infantry Regiments
      - 232nd Infantry Regiments
      - 233rd Infantry Regiments
    - 39th Recon Regiment
    - 39th Field Artillery Regiment
    - 39th Military Engineer Regiment
    - 39th Transport Regiment
- Hirabayashi Force – Lt-General Morito Hirabayashi at Zhongxiang
  - Elements of 17th Division – Lt-General Morito Hirabayashi
    - 17th Infantry Brigade Group
      - 53rd Infantry Regiment
      - 54th Infantry Regiment
      - 81st Infantry Regiment
    - 23rd Field Artillery Regiment
    - 7th Military Engineer Regiment
    - 17th Transport Regiment
  - Kurahashi Detachment – Col. Kurahashi
    - 60th Infantry Regiment, detached from 15th Division in the Nanchang area.
- Kitano Force – Lt. Gen Kenzo Kitano, north of Zhongxiang in the vicinity of modern Shuanghe
  - Elements of 4th Division – Lt. Gen Kenzo Kitano
    - 4th Infantry Brigade group:
      - 8th Infantry Regiment
      - 37th Infantry Regiment
      - 61st Infantry Regiment
    - 4th Recon Regiment
    - 4th Field Artillery Regiment
    - 4th Military Engineer Regiment
    - 4th Transport Regiment
  - Kususe Armored force – ?
    - 7th Tank Regiment
    - 13th Tank Regiment
    - ? Tank Regiment
- Teshima Force – Lt. General Fusataro Teshima, at Suixian
  - 3rd Division – Lt. General Fusataro Teshima
    - 5th Infantry Brigade
      - 6th Infantry Regiment
      - 68th Infantry Regiment
    - 29th Infantry Brigade
      - 18th Infantry Regiment
      - 34th Infantry Regiment
    - 3rd Field Artillery Regiment
    - 3rd Cavalry Regiment
    - 3rd Engineer Regiment
    - 3rd Transport Regiment

Notes

- 15th Division – Lt-General Keiichi Kumagai 1940–1941
- 7th and 13th were two of three Tank regiments assigned to 11th Army in late 1940.

== China ==
5th War Area – Li Zongren

- River West Group / 33rd Group Army – Feng Zhi'an
  - 77th Army – Feng Zhi'an (concurrent)
    - 37th Division – Li Jiusi
    - 132nd Division – Wang Zhanghai
    - 179th Division – Liu Zhenshan
  - 30th Army – Wang Zhonglian or Zhi Fengzheng
    - 27th Division – Xu Wenyao
    - 30th Division – Liu Zhensan
    - 31st Division – Nie Zibin
- Right Flank Group / 29th Group Army – Wang Zuanxu
  - 44th Army – Liao Chen
    - 149th Division
    - 150th Division
  - 67th Army – Xu Shaozong
    - 161st Division
    - 162nd Division
- Central Flank Group / 22nd Group Army – Sun Chen
  - 41st Army – Zhen Tingxun
    - 125th Division
    - 127th Division
  - 45th Army – Sun Zhen
    - 122nd Division
    - 124th Division
- 59th Army- Huang Weigang [moved to Xiangfan area as a mobile reserve]
  - 38th Division – Li Jiusi
  - 180th Division – Liu Zhensan

== Sources ==
From: Senshi Sōshō

11th Army – Lt. General Waichiro Sonobe – Kayashima Force – Lt. Gen Takashi Kayashima 1939–1941 at Dangyang—18th Independent Mixed Brigade – Lt. Gen Takashi Kayashima 1939– 1941—40th Division – Lt-General Naojiro Amaya, – Murakami Force – Lt. Gen Keisaku Murakami at Jingmen—39th Division – Lt. Gen Keisaku Murakami -Teshima Force – Lt. General Fusataro Teshima [at Suixian] – 3rd Division – Fusataro Teshima
