= Masaru =

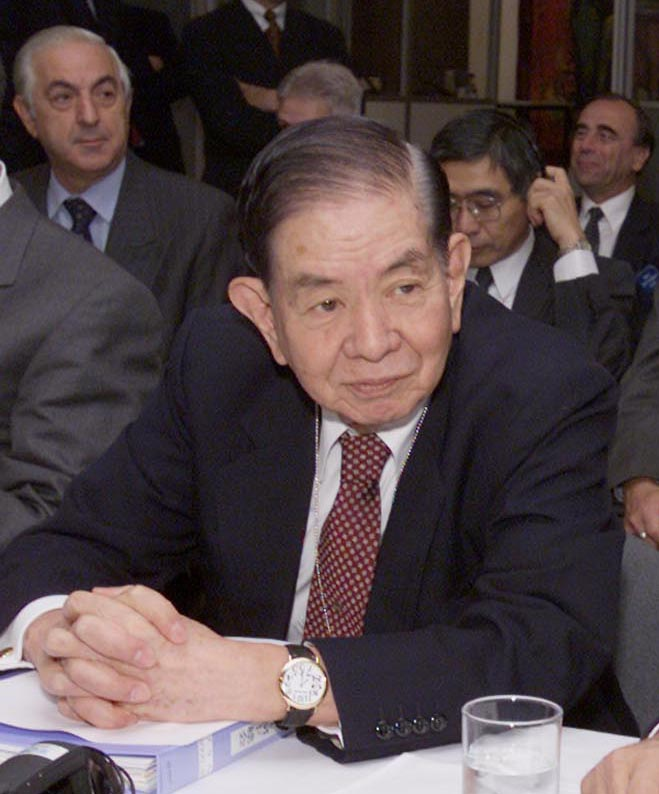
- Masaru Hayami, the 28th Governor of the Bank of Japan
- Pronunciation: Má-sá-rú
- Gender: Male

Origin
- Origin: Japanese
- Meaning: It can have many different meanings depending on the kanji used.
- Region of origin: Japanese

Other names
- Related names: Suguru

Masaru (まさる, マサル) is a masculine Japanese given name.

== Written forms ==
Masaru can be written using different kanji characters and can mean:

- 勝, "excel"
- 優, "excel"
- 大, "large"
- 将 or 將, "commander"
- 太, "excel"

The name can also be written in hiragana or katakana.

== People with the name ==
- Masaru Akiba (秋葉 勝; born 1984), Japanese former football player
- Masaru Amono (天野 勝; 1942–2006), Japanese professional golfer
- Masaru Aoki (青木 正児; 1887–1964), Japanese Sinologist
- Masaru Arai (新井 優; born 1952), Japanese amateur astronomer
- Masaru Emoto (江本 勝; 1943–2014), Japanese businessman, author and pseudoscientist
- Masaru Fujii (藤井 聖; born 1996), Japanese professional baseball pitcher
- Masaru Furukawa (古川 勝; 1936–1993), Japanese swimmer and Olympic champion
- Masaru Fuse (布施 勝; born 1969), Japanese equestrian
- Gagamaru Masaru (臥牙丸 勝; born 1987), Georgian sumo wrestler
- Masaru Gokita (後田 勝; born 1970), Japanese mixed martial artist
- Masaru Hamaguchi (濱口 優; born 1972), Japanese comedian and actor
- Masaru Hashiguchi (橋口 勝; born 1974), Japanese former football player
- Masaru Hashimoto (橋本 昌; born 1945), Japanese politician
- Masaru Hayami (速水 優; 1925–2009), Japanese businessman, central banker
- Masaru Hidaka (日高 大; born 1995), Japanese professional footballer
- Masaru Ibuka (井深 大; 1908–1997), Japanese electronics industrialist and co-founder of Sony
- Masaru Ikeda (池田 勝; 1942–2026), Japanese actor and voice actor
- Masaru Imada (今田 勝; 1932–2025), Japanese jazz pianist and composer
- Grant Masaru Imahara (1970–2020) American electrical engineer, roboticist, television host and actor
- Masaru Inada (稲田 勝; born 1978), Japanese skeleton racer
- Masaru Ishizaka (石坂太; born 1980), Japanese politician
- Masaru Inoue (井上 勝; 1843–1910), Japanese engineer and bureaucrat, "Father of Japan's Railways"
- Masaru Ishizaka (石坂 太; born 1980), Japanese politician who elected the member of the House of Representatives in Tochigi 4th
- Masaru Kageura (景浦 將; 1915–1945), Japanese baseball player
- Masaru Kamata (蒲田 勝; born 1940), Japanese sprinter
- Masaru Kanbe (神戸 勝; born 1938), Japanese field hockey player
- Masaru Kaneko (金子 勝; born 1952), Japanese Marxian economist
- Masaru Kashiwahara (柏原 勝; born 1914), Japanese rower
- Masaru Kato (加藤 大; born 1991), Japanese footballer
- Masaru Katori (かとり まさる; born 1968), female Japanese writer and manga author
- Masaru Kawasaki (川崎 優; 1924–2018), Japanese conductor and composer
- Masaru Kitao (北尾 勝; born 1961), Japanese animator
- Masaru Kitsuregawa (喜連川 優; born 1955), Japanese computer scientist
- Masaru Konuma (小沼 勝; 1937–2023), Japanese film director
- Masaru Kurotsu (黒津 勝; born 1982), Japanese football player
- Kyokutenhō Masaru (旭天鵬 勝; born 1987), Mongolian sumo wrestler
- Masaru Maeta (前田 勝; 1982–2020), Japanese sumo wrestler
- Masaru Masuda (増田 勝; born 1955), Japanese former taijiquan athlete
- Masaru Matsuhashi (松橋 優; born 1985), Japanese former football player
- Masaru Miyauchi (宮内 優; born 1984), Japanese bobsledder
- Masaru Miyazaki (宮崎 勝; born 1958), Japanese politician
- Masaru Motegi (茂木 優; born 1950), Japanese sport wrestler
- Masaru Edward Fulenwider-Musashi (born 1977) Wushu martial artist, stuntman and an actor
- Masaru Mukai (向井 優; born 1949), Japanese astronomer
- Masaru Nagai (born 1978 ), Japanese actor known for Mirai Sentai Timeranger
- Masaru Nagaoka (長岡 勝; born 1962), Japanese ski jumper
- Masaru Nakamura (中村 勝; born 1991), Japanese baseball player
- Masaru Nakashige (中重 勝; born 1963), Japanese sport shooter
- Masaru Nashimoto (梨元 勝; 1944–2010), Japanese reporter
- Masaru Ogawa (小川 勝; born 1964), Japanese former competitive figure skater
- Masaru Okunishi (奥西 勝; 1926–2015), Japanese murderer
- Masaru Saito (齊藤 勝; born 1988), Japanese baseball player
- Masaru Sakano (坂野 勝; born 1942), Japanese modern pentathlete
- Masaru Sakurai (桜井 賢; born 1955), member of the Japanese musical group The Alfee
- Masaru Sato (佐藤 勝; 1928–1999), Japanese composer of film scores
- Masaru Shimabukuro (優), a member of the Okinawan music band Begin
- Masaru Shintani (新谷 勝; 1928–2000), Japanese-Canadian master of karate
- Masaru Takeda (武田 勝; born 1978), Japanese former professional baseball pitcher and coach
- Masaru Takiguchi (born 1941), Japanese-born American artist and arts educator
- Masaru Takumi (宅見 勝; 1936–1997), Japanese yakuza
- Masaru Tomita (冨田 勝; born 1957), Japanese scientist
- Masaru Uchiyama (内山 勝; born 1957), Japanese former football player
- Masaru Uesaka (上坂 勝; 1892–1982), Japanese deputy team leader
- Masaru Uno (宇野 勝; born 1958), Japanese former professional baseball infielder
- Masaru Urata (浦田 勝; 1925–2026), Japanese politician
- Wakanohana Masaru (若乃花 勝; born 1971), Japanese sumo wrestler
- Masaru Wakasa (若狭 勝; born 1956), Japanese lawyer and politician
- Masaru Watanabe (渡辺 勝; born 1993), Japanese professional baseball outfielder
- Masaru Yamada (山田 優; born 1994), Japanese right-handed épée fencer
- Masaru Yanagida (柳田 勝; born 1969), Japanese sport shooter
- Masaru Yanagisawa (柳沢 勝; died 2007), Chairman of the Hakodate Singapore Society
- Masaru Yokoyama (横山 克; born 1982), Japanese composer and arranger

== Fictional characters ==
- Masaru (マサル), a character in the manga and animated film Akira
- Masaru Daimon (Marcus Damon in the English dub), a character from the anime series Digimon Savers
- Masaru Kato (勝), a character from the anime and manga series Gantz
- Masaru Aoki of Hajime no Ippo
- Masaru Sera, the Third Chairman of the Tojo Clan in the first game in the Yakuza series
  - Masaru Watase, the Waka gashira of the Omi Alliance in Yakuza 5
- Masaru "Echo" Enatsu, an SAT operative in Tom Clancy's Rainbow Six Siege.
- Masaru Daimon, a character in Danganronpa Another Episode: Ultra Despair Girls.
- Masaru Bakugou (爆豪 勝), Katsuki Bakugo's father and the husband of Mitsuki Bakugo in the manga and anime My Hero Academia
- Konaka Masaru (Japanese name for Redd White), a character in Ace Attorney

== See also ==
- 27791 Masaru, a main-belt asteroid
- IEEE Masaru Ibuka Consumer Electronics Award
- Sexy Commando Gaiden: Sugoiyo!! Masaru-san, a manga series
