= Japanese Devils =

2001 documentary by Minoru Matsui

Riben guizi
- Directed by: Minoru Matsui
- Screenplay by: Minoru Matsui
- Produced by: Minoru Matsui, Ken'ichi Oguri
- Starring: Yasuji Kaneko, Yoshio Shinozuka
- Cinematography: Ken'ichi Oguri
- Edited by: Minoru Matsui
- Music by: Ryosuke Sato
- Release date: 2001
- Running time: 160 minutes
- Country: Japan
- Language: Japanese

Japanese Devils (or Riben Guizi 日本鬼子) is a 2001 Japanese documentary directed by Minoru Matsui about the war crimes committed by the Imperial Japanese Army between 1931 and 1945.

== Scenario ==
The documentary is a series of interviews with 14 Japanese veterans of the Second Sino-Japanese War who recount rape, massacres, bio-experiments, and cannibalism. The accuracy of these interviews is contested by Japanese nationalist critics.

== Production ==
Minoru Matsui's inspiration for the film came after one of his original interviewees died. Feeling that it was his last chance to document the stories, he began the process of creating the documentary. Initial support was minimal, with all production companies showing no interest. The film did not gain any traction until it was entered into the Berlin Film Festival.

The original title, Riben Guizi, is a Chinese phrase popular in the 1930s and 1940s used to express hatred for Japanese invaders.

== Controversy ==
The 14 former soldiers interviewed in the film were ex-POWs of China and were subjected to "re-education" by the Chinese government in the Fushun War Criminals Management Centre. This caused critics to question the accuracy of the interviews.

Japanese ultra-nationalists were reported to have issued threats against the content of the film.

== See also ==
- Anti-Japanese sentiment in China
- China–Japan relations
