= Battle of Zaoyang–Yichang =

Battle of the Second Sino-Japanese War

- Part of Second Sino-Japanese War
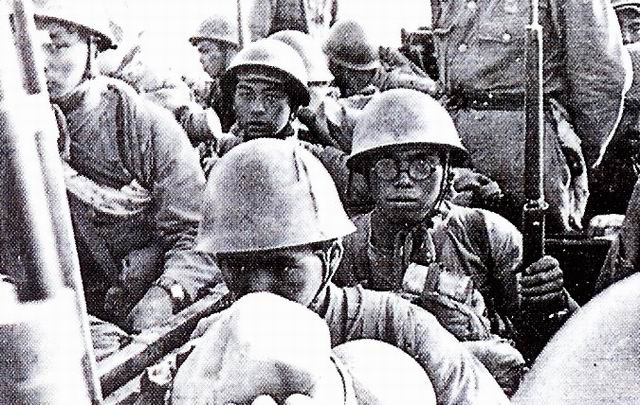
- Japanese troops in the battle of Zaoyang-Yichang
Date	May 1 – June 18, 1940 (1 month, 2 weeks and 3 days)
Location	Vicinities of Zaoyang city and Yichang city in Hubei province, Republic of China 32.1252°N 112.7510°E
Result	Japanese victory

Belligerents
Republic of China	Empire of Japan

Commanders and leaders
(Republic of China (1912–1949)) Li Zongren (Republic of China (1912–1949)) Zhang Zizhong †	(Empire of Japan) Waichiro Sonobe

Strength
18,970 officers and 381,258 soldiers	IJA 11th Army; 200+ tanks 100+ aircraft 1st China Expeditionary Fleet

Casualties and losses
Japanese records: 63,127 killed; 4,797 captured; 81 artillery pieces captured; 727 automatic weapons captured; 12,557 rifles captured; Chinese records: 768 officers and 36,215 soldiers killed 2,066 officers and 48,443 soldiers wounded 645 officers and 22,473 soldiers missing	Japanese record: 1,403 killed and 4,639 wounded

The Battle of Zaoyang–Yichang, also known as the Battle of Zaoyi (Chinese: 棗宜會戰), was one of the 22 major engagements between the National Revolutionary Army and Imperial Japanese Army during the Second Sino-Japanese War.

== Background ==
The Japanese were seeking a quicker solution to achieve a Chinese surrender. The Japanese contemplated moving directly down the Yangtze to the relocated Chinese capital, Chongqing. To do so, they would need to capture a critical town in western Hubei province, Yichang.

== Battle ==
On 1 May 1940, three divisions of the IJA 11th Army under command of General Waichiro Sonobe began a drive towards Zaoyang. They pushed towards the 5th warzone's strongholds in the Tongbaishan and Dahongshan mountains, attempting to encircle and destroy the Chinese 31st Army Group under General Tang Enbo in a pincer movement. The Chinese strategy aimed to let the Japanese forces run low on supplies, and then counterattack, as had been successfully employed at the Battle of Changsha. When the Japanese managed to outmaneuver Tang's forces, General Zhang Zizhong marched to his aid with the Chinese 33rd Army Group. The Japanese forces rallied and pushed back the Chinese, and General Zhang Zizhong was cut down in a burst of machine gun fire when he refused to retreat from the front lines. He was the most senior Chinese commander to be killed in combat during the war.

After defeating Zhang Zizhong's 33rd army group, the 11th army launched a general offensive against the fourteen to fifteen Chinese divisions gathered around Zaoyang on May 19. The 75th Army and the 56th Division of the 39th Army suffered very heavy casualties and retreated to the west bank of the Tangbai River. At dusk on May 20, the 233rd Infantry Regiment of the 39th Division sent three officers to scout ahead for the crossing point of the Tangbai River. Two of the scouts laid prone on the ground and used telescopes to observe the situation on the other side. The third scout stood upright as incoming gunfire was light and believed that the land they were observing was a sandbar. However, the report from the other two scouts, who judged that it was the opposite bank of the river, was accepted. At midnight on the 21st, the regiment began to land on what was believed to be the other side of the river. As soon as a green signal was fired to indicate a successful crossing, the defending 4th Peace Preservation Regiment of Hubei Province led by Li Langxing (李朗星), which had been lying in wait, opened fire all at once. As the sandbar offered no cover, the regiment quickly suffered heavy losses, losing more than 300 troops including regimental commander Tetsujirō Kanzaki (神崎哲次郎). The Tangbai River crossing became known as the Japanese 39th Division's most tragic battle.

== Supporting Operations ==
=== Chinese Summer Offensive ===
To support the Fifth War Zone in the battle of Zaoyang-Yichang, the Ninth War Zone and a portion of the Third War Zone launched a wide-scale Summer Offensive against units of the Japanese 11th Army in garrison duties from May to June 1940. In Northern Hunan and Southern Hubei, seven divisions and two guerilla detachments of the Chinese 15th and 27th Group Armies besieged the Japanese 6th Division and 40th Division at Linxiang, Yueyang, Chongyang and Tongcheng. In Northern Jiangxi, more than a hundred thousand Chinese troops from eleven divisions of the 1st, 19th, and 32nd Group Armies besieged the 34th Division in the surrounding areas of Nanchang and the 33rd Division at Anyi, Fengxin, and Jing'an. The 30th Group Army also attacked the 33rd Division near Wuning. During the Chinese offensive, the Japanese Army launched an attack on the 99th Army at Liuyang.

After many weeks of fierce fighting, the 11th Army succeeded in repelling the Chinese attacks on all fronts. In this offensive, the Chinese Army suffered 18,719 casualties including 7,125 killed, 10,369 wounded, and 1,225 missing while the Japanese Army suffered 850 killed and 2,015 wounded. Of all the fronts in the Chinese operation, the Nanchang battlefield between five divisions of the 49th and 70th Armies of the 32nd Group Army of the Third War Zone and three divisions of the 74th Army of the 19th Group Army of the Ninth War Zone and the Japanese 34th Division was the fiercest, accounting for half or more of the casualties in the whole offensive.

The 11th Army recorded that, excluding the battle of Zaoyang-Yichang, its units fought against over 230,000 Chinese troops from units of Ninth War Zone, the 32nd Group Army of the Third War Zone, and certain units of the Fifth War Zone in 784 battles in May and June of 1940, claiming 18,022 abandoned enemy corpses and 712 POWs while suffering 1,062 killed and 2,146 wounded. The Ninth War Zone in May and June and the 32nd Group Army of the Third War Zone in the attack on Nanchang reported suffering 8,826 killed, 11,451 wounded, and 1,061 missing. The Ninth War Zone claimed to have killed or wounded 11,506 Japanese troops of the 6th, 33rd, 34th, and 40th Divisions and captured 6 during the same period.

=== Liangkou Operation ===
To support the 11th Army's offensive, the South China Area Army deployed the main force of the 38th Division, three infantry battalions of the 18th Division, and one infantry battalion of the 104th Division to capture Liangkou in northeast Guangdong and contain enemy forces south of Hengyang. This operation is known in China as the Second Battle of Northern Guangdong. On May 22, the 229th Infantry Regiment of the 38th Division occupied Liangkou and the main force of the division gathered in its vicinity. At the time, four divisions of the 62nd and 65th Armies besieged the 229th Infantry Regiment at Liangkou from all fronts. Despite being outnumbered, the Japanese regiment held out against the concentrated attack by the large enemy force, with the 2nd and 4th Companies in particular losing more than half of their troops. Meanwhile, the main force of the 104th Division and a portion of the 18th Division launched an offensive against the Chinese besieging Liangkou and inflicted heavy casualties.

Having achieved its operational objective of containing Chinese forces in South China, the South China Area Army ordered the 38th Division to move towards Conghua while the 18th Division and 104th Division returned to their original positions. Interpreting the redeployment of the Japanese units as a retreat, the Chinese Army launched an assault on the 38th Division with reinforcements from the 63rd Army. On June 12, the Japanese 11th Army captured Yichang and the 38th Division was ordered to return to its original position. In the operation, the Guangdong 12th Group Army of the Seventh War Zone suffered 3,068 killed, 2,225 wounded, and 330 missing and the South China Area Army suffered 251 killed and 548 wounded.

=== Other Operations ===
Aside from the Summer Offensive, various units of the Third War Zone conducted guerrilla warfare against the Japanese 13th Army to support the Fifth War Zone in the battle of Zaoyang-Yichang. From May 1940 to the end of the year, the 108th Division harassed the positions of the 60th Infantry Regiment of the 15th Division near Xuancheng and other places in Southern Anhui. In early June, the 192nd Division and Jiangnan 1st Advance Column launched attacks on strongholds at Wuxing, Wukang, and other places in Zhejiang to contain the 22nd Division. The Sichuanese 146th, 147th, and 148th Divisions of the 21st Army of the 23rd Group Army and the 2nd Jiangxi Peace Preservation Regiment faced a massive attack at Pengze, Hukou, and Duchang in Jiangxi in an effort by the Japanese to stop their river blockade actions and prevent them from supporting the Fifth War Zone, fighting until a stalemate set in at the end of June.

== Aftermath ==
Chinese records claimed that 11,000 Japanese troops were killed.

The Japanese China Expeditionary Army recorded 2,729 combat deaths and 23,538 wounded in May 1940 across all fronts, 2,512 combat deaths and 13,416 wounded in June, and 1,059 combat deaths and 4,484 wounded in July. According to the unit history Wakamatsu Rentai Kaisōroku (Memoirs of the Wakamatsu Regiment), compiled by Japanese veterans, the 65th Infantry Regiment had 280 men killed in action.

On 9 July 1940, Japanese Army railway transportation units in Japan transported two batches of replacement personnel to the 13th Division, numbering 1,117 men (including 108 officers) and 497 men (including 60 officers), According to Wakamatsu Rentai Kaisōroku, between August 1940 and February 1941, the 65th Infantry Regiment received 844 replacement personnel. In addition, shortly after the end of the battle, on 15 July, Japanese Army railway transportation units likewise transported two batches of replacement personnel to the 3rd Division. One batch consisted of 3,366 enlisted men and 124 officers, while the other consisted of 2,461 enlisted men and 93 officers. On July 18, Japanese Army railway transportation units also transported 180 officer cadets to the 13th Infantry Regiment of the 6th Division and its attached units.

While the Chinese 5th War Area arguably made tactically sound decisions in its battle plans, it was ultimately overwhelmed by the sheer firepower of the Japanese combined arms offensive, relying primarily on small arms to face the onslaught of Japanese air, naval, artillery, and armoured striking power. As the Chinese commanders had surmised, the Japanese forces were overextended, and were not in a position to pursue their victory. However, the Imperial Japanese Navy pushed strongly for the occupation of Yichang, located at the edge of Sichuan and connecting the 5th and 9th War Zones. The Navy felt that it was critically needed as a forward base for air attacks against Chongqing. After considerable argument, the Japanese Army agreed to occupy Yichang. This dealt a considerable blow to the morale and fighting capacity of the Chinese as no large-scale offensive was mounted after this operation.

== Chinese casualties ==
The "History of the Anti-Japanese War" recorded Chinese losses as 36,983 killed, 50,509 wounded, and 23,118 missing. Some of the units which took part in the battle were however not included in the casualty statistics, such as the 128th Division which was included in the battle order but its strength or casualties were not recorded in the war history book. The Independent 44th Brigade and Bie Guanghan's self-defense army of the 6th District of Henan Province were recorded in the war history book as suffering very heavy casualties in the fighting on May 7, 1940 at Tanghe County and Yuantan Town. The 732nd Regiment commander of the independent brigade was badly wounded, one battalion—with the exception of over 60 survivors—was completely wiped out, and the other two battalions lost more than half of their troops. The 2nd Regiment commander of the self-defense army was also badly wounded and both units were withdrawn for reorganization after just that day's fighting. Neither units were included in the book's casualty statistics. The various guerrilla units of Li Pinxian's Henan-Hubei-Anhui Border Region guerilla army and all special forces unit, which were included in the battle order, were not included in the casualty statistics. It was also noted in the statistical table that the casualties of the 2nd Army did not include the losses of the 103rd Division. The headquarters of the 33rd Group Army suffered 65 killed, 89 wounded, and 95 missing in the battle which was not recorded in the "History of the Anti-Japanese War", as was the case with the 8 killed, 3 wounded, and 2 missing suffered by the headquarters of the 11th Group Army.

The 68th Army was recorded in the Republic of China's war history book as suffering 2,015 killed, 4,741 wounded, and 48 missing in the battle of Zaoyang-Yichang. Liu Ruming, the commander of the 68th Army, reported his unit's losses by June 7, 1940 as 2,303 killed, 4,740 wounded, and 48 missing. The war history book recorded the losses of the 84th Army as 1,413 killed, 1,255 wounded, and 2,894 missing. This exact figure was only the casualties of the 84th Army in the battle of Zaoyang-Yichang from May 2 to May 21, 1940 according to the army's statistics. In the battle of Suixian-Zaoyang-Xinyang from June 3 to July 30, 1940, the 68th Army suffered a further 92 killed and 221 wounded, the 84th Army suffered 67 killed and 116 wounded, and the South Henan guerillas lost 40 troops killed. The losses of the 68th Army for the whole battle were confirmed at over 7,200 casualties from 2nd Group Army commander Sun Lianzhong's report on July 23, 1940.

The "History of the Anti-Japanese War" recorded 2,070 killed, 3,111 wounded, and 430 missing from the 30th Army, 473 killed, 360 wounded, and 334 missing from the 55th Army, 1,864 killed, 2,543 wounded, and 2,136 missing from the 75th Army, 1,930 killed, 860 wounded, and 169 missing from the 85th Army, and 2,510 killed, 2,737 wounded, and 1,485 missing from the 94th Army. Another official NRA military statistics put the losses of the 30th Army in the battle of Zaoyang-Yichang from May 1 to June 30, 1940 at 6,413 casualties. According to the statistics of the Right Group Army, of the units of the 55th Army, the 29th Division suffered 31 killed and 49 wounded and the 74th Division suffered more than 2,000 casualties in the battle of Hedong from May 1 to May 31, 1940. According to the detailed battle report of the 31st Group Army, the headquarters of the 55th Army suffered 3 killed and 13 wounded and the 29th Division suffered 478 killed, 365 wounded, and 332 missing in the battle near Jing-Dang and Yuan-Yi from June 3 to July 15, 1940. Cao Fulin, the commander of the 55th Army, reported on June 14, 1940, that the 29th Division suffered 145 casualties in the battle of Hedong and over 500 casualties in the battle of Jingmen on June 6 and June 7. The 74th Division had also suffered 2,708 casualties. A later report on July 15, 1940 put the losses of the 55th Army in the South Henan-North Hubei Operation until June 10 at 3,388 casualties. The losses of the 75th Army recorded in "History of the Anti-Japanese War" was only the casualties in May 1940, the losses of the 85th Army were from May 3 to June 2, 1940, and the losses of the 94th Army were from June 3 to July 15, 1940. The losses of the 94th Army in guerrilla fighting in May 1940 were not included in the statistics, with the 121st Division alone suffering more than 500 casualties. Aside from the 55th Army, the 30th Army also suffered 308 killed and 896 wounded, the 75th Army suffered 242 killed, 374 wounded, and 52 missing, and the 85th Army suffered 312 killed and 426 wounded from June 3 to July 15, 1940.

According to the "History of the Anti-Japanese War", the 41st Army suffered 1,001 killed, 1,701 wounded, and 795 missing in the battle of Zaoyang-Yichang. According to the detailed battle report of the 22nd Group Army, the 41st Army suffered 3,060 killed, 3,773 wounded, and 324 missing in May and June 1940. Sun Zhen, the commander of the 22nd Group Army, also reported on July 28, 1940 the losses of the 41st Army at 7,157 officers and soldiers casualties. The 44th and 67th Armies of the 29th Group Army were recorded as suffering a total of 2,019 killed, 3,079 wounded, and 334 missing in the battle of Zaoyang-Yichang in the NRA war history book. Wang Zuanxu, the commander of the 29th Group Army, reported on June 9, 1940 the total losses of his unit from May 2 to June 5 at 7,696 officers and soldiers casualties including 3,602 killed, 3,163 wounded, and 931 missing. The 18th Army was recorded as suffering 2,481 killed, 4,470 wounded, and 488 missing in the NRA war history for the battle, but another official NRA military source put the losses of the army at 10,654 killed or wounded and 305 missing.

== See also ==
- Order of Battle: Battle of Zaoyang-Yichang

== Sources ==
- Hsu Long-hsuen and Chang Ming-kai, History of The Sino-Japanese War (1937–1945) 2nd Ed., 1971. Translated by Wen Ha-hsiung, Chung Wu Publishing; 33, 140th Lane, Tung-hwa Street, Taipei, Taiwan Republic of China. Page 334-339, Map 20, 21
- van de Ven, Hans. War and Nationalism in China: 1925–1945,
