= Takiguchi =

Takiguchi(also Takigutchi or Takigucci) (written: 滝口 or 瀧口) is a Japanese surname. Notable people with the surname include:

- Junpei Takiguchi (滝口 順平, 1931–2011), Japanese voice actor and narrator
- Masaru Takiguchi (born 1941), American sculptor
- Shūzō Takiguchi (瀧口 修造, 1903–1979), Japanese poet, art critic and artist
- Yukihiro Takiguchi (滝口 幸広, 1985–2019), Japanese actor

== See also ==
- 7802 Takiguchi, a main-belt asteroid
