= Yasuji Kaneko =

Soldier of the Imperial Japanese Army

Yasuji Kaneko (金子 安次, Kaneko Yasuji; January 28, 1920 – November 25, 2010) was an ex-soldier of the Imperial Japanese Army, and a former detainee of both Siberian Internment by the Soviet Union during 1945–1950 and Fushun War Criminals Management Centre in China during 1950–1956. He was known for his extensive war crimes testimony, including his alleged involvement in the Unit 731. His testimony appeared in the 2001 documentary film Japanese Devils and the 2007 documentary film Nanking, an adaption of Iris Chang's book The Rape of Nanking (although Kaneko was not involved in the Nanjing Massacre). He was a member of the Association of Returnees from China.

== Testimony ==
Kaneko started giving public testimony around 1996, at the age of 76. According to his testimony, he joined the army in 1940, and spread cholera into the water system of Linqing in September 1943. In an interview with the Japan Times on 26 September 1996, Yasuji stated "I murdered 100 people or more by torture." He also stated that he murdered and raped many Chinese people.

He testified during an interview with English professor and activist Yun Chung-Ok in December 2000: "Comfort women were expensive. Therefore, I kidnapped, raped, and killed the Chinese women." In an interview with the Washington Post he claimed that he raped many Chinese women during the invasion of China.

"They cried out, but it didn't matter to us whether the women lived or died," Kaneko said in an interview with The Associated Press at his Tokyo home. "We were the emperor's soldiers. Whether in military brothels or in the villages, we raped without reluctance."

In the Japanese documentary Japanese Devils, which features 14 Japanese soldiers retelling their roles in war crimes committed by Japan during World War II, Kaneko describes an incident in which he and his unit surrounded and wiped out an entire village for the thrill of it, rather than any threat it offered. The reviewer notes that all soldiers interviewed in Minori Matsui's film were ex-POWs of the Chinese government and subjected to a long "re-education" that may call their testimony into question. However, the Japan Times reviewer, Mark Schilling felt that "they give impression of being not communist-controlled robots but elderly men who have little time and nothing to lose" .

== Controversy ==
According to Japanese historian Ikuhiko Hata, Kaneko's testimony is not consistent with well-known historical facts. His division was located in Qingdao, so he could not have been a member of Unit 731, which was located in Manchuria, far Northern China. Hata concluded that if Kaneko did commit any atrocities, it was on his own initiative. Kaneko responded by saying that Hata had not experienced the horrors of war and did not know what it was like.

== See also ==
- Japanese war crimes
- Japan and weapons of mass destruction
