= Shigeru Fujita =

Japanese officer, war criminal 1889-1980

- 藤田 茂
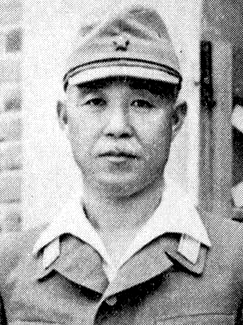
- Born: September 17, 1889; Hiroshima, Japan
- Died: April 11, 1980 (aged 90); Japan
- Education: Imperial Japanese Army Academy
- Military career
- Allegiance: Empire of Japan
- Branch: Imperial Japanese Army
- Service years: 1911–1945
- Rank: Lieutenant General
- Unit: 1st Cavalry Brigade
- Commands: IJA 28th Cavalry Regiment; IJA 15th Cavalry Regiment; IJA 2nd Cavalry Brigade; IJA 4th Cavalry Brigade; IJA 59th Division
- Conflicts: Second Sino-Japanese War; World War II
- Other work: Chairman of the Association of Returnees from China

Shigeru Fujita (藤田 茂, Fujita Shigeru; September 17, 1889 – April 11, 1980) was a career military officer and lieutenant general in the Imperial Japanese Army during the Second Sino-Japanese War and World War II.

== Biography ==
Fujita was born in Hiroshima Prefecture, where his father was also a career Japanese Army officer. He attended military preparatory elementary school in Hiroshima and high school in Tokyo, and graduated from the 23rd class of then Imperial Japanese Army Academy in May 1911, and served as a junior officer in a cavalry regiment. In 1921 he became a company commander, and after attended Cavalry School, was assigned to the 1st Cavalry Brigade. He was promoted to major in 1928 and captain in March 1935. In 1935, Fujita served as aide d'camp to Prince Kan'in Kotohito.

In July 1938, he was assigned command of the IJA 28th Cavalry Regiment and was dispatched to China for combat operations during the Second Sino-Japanese War. In March 1940, as commander of the IJA 15th Cavalry Regiment, he was assigned to patrols of the Nanjing area. In July 1941, he was assigned command of the IJA 2nd Cavalry Brigade and was promoted to major general in October of the same year.

In December, he returned to Japan to take command of the Urawa garrison in Urawa, Saitama. However, as the war drew to an end, he was recalled to combat duty and became commander of the IJA 4th Cavalry Brigade. He was promoted to lieutenant general in March 1945.

His final command was that of the IJA 59th Division in Shandong Province, China. The 59th Division was ordered to withdraw from China without being replaced, fighting continue rear guard action. During that time, a scorched earth policy was extensively used, during which the division committed numerous atrocities, like using civilians to clear minefields, and the mass killing of civilians. It also resorted to the use of chemical warfare and possibly biological warfare during its retreat, The last battalions of the 59th Division arrived in Hamhung, Korea in early July 1945.

Fujita was apprehended by Soviet forces in Hamhung on the surrender of Japan in August 1945 and was sent as a prisoner of war to Siberia. In July 1950 he was transferred to the Fushun War Criminals Management Centre in the People's Republic of China and in June 1956, more than 10 years after the end of the war, he was sentenced to 18 years imprisonment for war crimes, based largely on a series of confessions he made under duress in August 1954. In September 1957, he was released, and in April 1958 he was repatriated to Japan. From October 1960 until his death in 1980 he served as chairman of the Association of Returnees from China.
