= Battle of Zaoyang-Yichang order of battle =

Tsaoyang-Yichang Campaign 1 May – 18 June 1940

== Japan ==
- (Early May - Late June 1940)

11th Army - Lt. General Waichirō Sonobe [5]

- Northern Pincer
  - 3rd Division - General Masataka Yamawaki [1,4]
    - 5th Infantry Brigade
      - 6th Infantry Regiment
      - 68th Infantry Regiment
    - 29th Infantry Brigade
      - 18th Infantry Regiment
      - 34th Infantry Regiment
    - 3rd Field Artillery Regiment
    - 3rd Cavalry Regiment
    - 3rd Engineer Regiment
    - 3rd Transport Regiment
- Central Force
  - 39th Division - Lt Gen. Keisaku Murakami [1,4]
    - 39th Infantry Brigade Group:
      - 231st Infantry Regiment
      - 232nd Infantry Regiment
      - 233rd Infantry Regiment
    - 39th Recon Regiment
    - 39th Field Artillery Regiment
    - 39th Military Engineer Regiment
    - 39th Transport Regiment
- Southern Pincer
  - 13th Division - General Shizuichi Tanaka [1,4]
    - 26th Infantry Brigade
      - 58th Infantry Regiment
      - 116th Infantry Regiment
    - 103rd Infantry Brigade
      - 65th Infantry Regiment
      - 104th Infantry Regiment
    - 19th Mountain Artillery Regiment
    - 17th Cavalry Regiment[1]
    - 13th Engineer Regiment
    - 13th Transport Regiment
    - 20 Tanks [1] Possibly from 7th or 13th Tank Regiments [5]
- Ichang Column
  - Ikeda Detachment - Major Gen. Naomi Ikeda / 6th Division [5]
    - 11th Infantry Brigade
      - 13th Infantry Regiment
      - One battalion each from 47th, 23rd, 45th Infantry Regiments / 6th Div.
    - One battalion of 2nd Independent Mountain Gun Regiment / 11th Army
    - One platoon of 6th Cavalry Regiment / 6th Div.
    - One company of 6th Engineer Regiment / 6th Div.
    - Two companies of 6th Transport Regiment / 6th Div.
    - Kansui(漢水) Detachment - Col. Higaki (17th Anchorage HQ)[5]
      - 17th Anchorage HQ
      - 6th Reserve Battalion of Imperial Guard Division
      - 6th Independent Engineer Regiment
      - 1st Company of 10th Independent Engineer Regiment
      - Five Surface Transport Units
      - Construction Transport Unit
      - 9th Transport Supervision Unit

Navy

- 1st China Expeditionary Fleet [5]
  - NLF from 1st China Expeditionary Fleet[5]

Airforce: [3]

- 3rd Hikodan - Major General Kuwana
  - Headquarters in Hankou
- At Hankou airfield:
  - 17th Dokuritsu Hiko Chutai [Reconnaissance squadron.]
  - 44th Sentai (one reconnaissance and two direct cooperation units)
  - 59th Sentai
    - 1st Chutai Nakajima Ki-27
    - 2nd Chutai Nakajima Ki-27
- At Wuchang airfield:
  - 11th Sentai (less one chutai)
    - 2nd Chutai Nakajima Ki-27
    - 3rd Chutai Nakajima Ki-27
  - 75th Sentai [Light bomber unit]
- 3rd Hikodan was directed to cooperate with the land operations of the 11th Army and suppress the enemy air force.

Other forces in the Ichang Campaign, (Security forces to replace offensive units.)

- Yoshida Detachment - Col. Yoshida [5]
  - 61st Battalion / 14th Independent Mixed Brigade
  - (Sent from 14th Independent Mixed Brigade assigned to Juijiang area [2].)
- 40th Division(partial) - Lt. Gen Naojikiro Amaya [1,2,4]
  - (Said to have been sent to Xinyang area at the end of May 1940. [1] This may have been a mistake for the Ogawa Detachment sent from 34th Division.)
- Ogawa Detachment - Col. Ogawa [5]
  - 216th Infantry Regiment / 34th Division
- 18th Independent Mixed Brigade - Major-General Koichi Kayashima [2,4]
  - 92nd Independent infantry battalion
  - 93rd Independent infantry battalion
  - 94th Independent infantry battalion
  - 95th Independent infantry battalion
  - 96th Independent infantry battalion
  - Brigade artillery troops
  - Brigade engineer unit
  - Brigade communication unit
  - The 18th Independent Mixed Brigade: Formed on November 7, 1939, and enrolled in the 11th Army order of battle, in the northern Jiujiang area. [2] Said to have been sent from Wuning to Shayang area at the end of May 1940. [1]
- 101st Mixed Brigade - Major General Matsuyama [5]
  - China Stationed Infantry Battalion / 27th Division - Tianjin
  - 26th Independent Infantry Battalion / 7th Independent Mixed Brigade - Huimin area
  - From North China [5]
- Kurahashi Detachment - Col. Kurahashi
  - 60th Infantry Regiment / 15th Division
  - From 13th Army [5]
- Matsui Detachment - Major General Matsui [5]
  - 22nd Infantry Group / 22nd Division - Hangchow
    - 3 Battalions

== China ==
- (Mid April 1940)

5th War Area - Li Zongren

- 2nd Army Group - Sun Lianzhong
  - 68th Corps - Liu Ju-ming
    - 119th Division
    - 143rd Division
    - 27th Separate Brigade
  - 30th Corps - Chi Fengcheng
    - 27th Division
    - 30th Division
    - 31st Division
- 31st Army Group - Tang En-po
  - 13th Corps - Chang Hsueh-chung
    - 89th Division
    - 110th Division
    - 11th Separate Brigade
  - 85th Corps - Wang Chung-lien
    - 4th Division
    - 32nd Division
    - 11th Separate Brigade
- 11th Army Group - Huang Qixiang
  - 92nd Corps - Li Hsien-chao
    - 21st Division
    - 47th Division
  - 84th Corps - Mo Shu-chieh
    - 178th Division
    - 188th Division
- 29th Army Group - Wang Zuanxu
  - 44th Corps - Liao Chen
    - 149th Division
    - 150th Division
  - 67th Corps - Hsu Shao-tsung
    - 161st Division
    - 162nd Division
- 22nd Army Group - Sun Zhen
  - 45th Corps - Chen Ting-hsun
    - 125th Division
    - 127th Division
  - 41st Corps - Sun Chen
    - 122nd Division
    - 124th Division
  - 1st Guerrilla Division
- 33rd Army Group - Zhang Zizhong
  - 55th Corps - Tsao Fu-lin
    - 29th Division
    - 74th Division
  - 77th Corps - Feng Zhi'an
    - 37th Division
    - 132nd Division
    - 179th Division
  - 59th Corps - Huang Wei-kang
    - 38th Division
    - 180th Division
    - 9th Cavalry Division
- 75th Corps - Chao Ai
  - 6th Division
  - 13th Division
  - 4th Cavalry Division
- 39th Corps - Liu Ho-ting
  - 56th Division
- River Defense Force - Kuo Chan(Mid April 1940)
  - 94th Corps - Li Chi-lan
    - 12th Division
    - 185th Division
    - 55th Division
  - 26th Corps - Hsiao Chih-chu(Mid April 1940)
    - 23rd Division
    - 41st Division
    - 44th Division
- 2nd Corps - Li Yen-nien
  - 76th Division
  - 33rd Division
- New 12th Corps - Cheng Tung-kuo
  - 1st Honor Division
  - 5th Division
- 18th Corps - Peng Shan
  - 18th Division
  - 77th Division
  - 199th Division
- Eastern Hupei Guerilla Force
  - 7th Corps - Wang Tsan-pin
    - 171st Guerrilla Division
    - 172nd Guerrilla Division
    - 3rd Guerrilla Division
    - 4th Guerrilla Division
  - Commander Cheng Ju-hai
    - 16th Guerrilla Division
    - 19th Guerrilla Division
    - 11th Guerrilla Regiment

== Sources ==
- [1] Hsu Long-hsuen and Chang Ming-kai, History of The Sino-Japanese War (1937-1945) 2nd Ed., 1971. Translated by Wen Ha-hsiung, Chung Wu Publishing; 33, 140th Lane, Tung-hwa Street, Taipei, Taiwan Republic of China. Page 334–339, Map 20, 21
- [2] IJA in China orbat, 1937 to 1945
- [3] Sino-Japanese Air War 1937 – 1945
- [4] Generals from Japan (WWII)
- [6] Campaign Of Zao-Yi (Zaoyang-Yichang)
