= Association of Returnees from China =

Repatriated Japanese soldiers' group (1957–2002)

The Association of Returnees from China (中国帰還者連絡会, Chūgoku Kikansha Renraku Kai), was an organization formed on 24 September 1957 following the repatriation to Japan of soldiers from the former Imperial Japanese Army who were interned as war criminals in China's Fushun War Criminals Management Centre, where interns were subjected to intensive indoctrination by the Chinese Communist Party. While the Chinese government chose to prosecute the top Japanese leadership, it repatriated accused lower-ranking soldiers to Japan. Once in Japan, they gave testimony about their experience with crimes such as Unit 731, comfort women, and the Nanking Massacre, but often received stringent opposition from Japanese nationalists and militarists, who proclaimed them to be communists or "brainwashed" by the Chinese communist government. Its members included Yoshio Shinozuka, Yasuji Kaneko, Tadayuki Furumi, Shigeru Fujita and Ken Yuasa; the association was disbanded in 2002.

== Origins ==
1109 individuals were interned by the People's Republic of China, 969 in the Fushun War Criminals Management Centre and 140 in the Taiyuan War Criminals Management Centre, on suspicion of having committed war crimes within China during the Second Sino-Japanese War. Those held in Fushun had been captured in Manchuria by the USSR and after enduring internment in Siberia were transferred to China in 1950. They included many Japanese soldiers as well as Chinese such as Puyi and Zhang Jinghui. Those held in Taiyuan included Japanese soldiers who after the end of the Second Sino-Japanese War had joined the Nationalists and fought against the communists during the Chinese Civil War.

In contrast with their time in Siberia, Japanese POWs were given better treatment from the Chinese communists. However, a long-term "crime recognition campaign" was imposed at the same time on those soldiers who were believed to have undertaken, supported, and witnessed Japan's numerous and inhumane criminal acts during the war. This involved them reflecting on their own actions up to then and confessing their sins voluntarily, a process later described by Chukiren's detractors as "brainwashing". During the campaign, some interns killed themselves.

Under the authority of the "Decision of the Standing Committee of the National People's Congress Concerning Punishment of Japanese Troops Who Invaded China" of April 1956, the trials of 45 leading war criminals were undertaken in extraordinary military tribunals set up in Shenyang, Liaoning, and Taiyuan, Shanxi, between June and July. All the rest of the war crime suspects were pronounced at special courts within their internment centres to be exempt from prosecution and to be released immediately.

In 1957 some of these repatriated former war criminals whose sins were forgiven by the Chinese founded the Association of Returnees from China and launched an anti-war, pacifist movement and a campaign for Sino-Japanese friendship.

== Activities and criticism ==
At the heart of Chukiren's mission was exposing the foolishness of war, especially through testifying to the things that they themselves did in the war and on the battlefield. They were known for being very active in testifying about and cooperating with witnesses of things such as Unit 731, forced labor recruitment of Koreans, comfort women, and the Nanking Massacre. Because of this, many of the returnees ended up being branded as "red" regardless of their personal beliefs and experienced mistreatment in post-war Japan.

Writers such as Toshio Tanabe have also argued that the Japanese officers and men interned at Fushun were brainwashed by China. The returnees who gained their freedom thanks to China's lenient pardon when they should have been sentenced to a long-term or indefinite imprisonment or death were deeply grateful to the Chinese government, but they don't go so far as to deny the fact that China's true intention was that they, due to their ideological training, were useful people to be set free as disseminators of their ideas under a debt of gratitude to China for letting them off.

== Dissolution ==
Due to the aging of its members, the Association of Returnees from China was disbanded as a national organization in 2002 and its work was carried on by the "Continuing the Miracle of Fushun Society" composed of younger activists.

== See also ==
- Fushun War Criminals Management Centre
- Women's International War Crimes Tribunal on Japan's Military Sexual Slavery

== Bibliography ==
- Toshio Arai and Akira Fujiwara, 侵略の証言―中国における日本人戦犯自筆供述書 (Tokyo: Iwanami Shoten, 1999).
- 中国侵略の証言者たち -「認罪」の記録を読む, edited by Fujio Ogino, Yoshida Yutaka, and Makio Okabe (Tokyo: Iwanami Shoten, 2010).
