= 58th Division (Imperial Japanese Army) =

- Active: 1942 - 1945
- Country: Empire of Japan
- Branch: Imperial Japanese Army
- Type: Infantry
- Size: 12080
- Garrison/HQ: Yingcheng
- Nickname: Wide Division
- Engagements: Battle of West Hubei; Operation Ichi-Go

The 58th Division (第58師団, Dai-gojūhachi Shidan) was an infantry division of the Imperial Japanese Army. Its call sign was the Wide Division (広兵団, Kou Heidan). It was formed in Hankou on 2 February 1942 as a Class C security division, alongside the 59th and 60th Divisions. The division was formed around the 18th Independent Mixed Brigade. Many soldiers from the 136th Infantry Brigade of the 106th Division, which had been disbanded in 1940, were also reassigned to the 58th Division. As a security division, the 58th Division consisted primarily of independent infantry battalions and had no artillery regiment.

== Action ==
Immediately after its formation in Hankou, the 58th Division was transferred to Yingcheng. It initially continued to carry out the security duties previously performed by the 18th Independent Mixed Brigade.

In May 1943, the 58th Division participated in the inconclusive Battle of West Hubei, helping to temporarily secure the river route between Yichang and Wuhan.

The 58th Division participated in Operation Ichi-Go from May 1944, operating around Hengyang between 20 July and 8 August 1944. It later operated around Guilin. Following the Japanese breakthrough, the division was assigned to garrison duty under the headquarters of the Eleventh Army in Liuzhou. Its area of responsibility bordered the sectors held by the 3rd Division to the south and the 13th Division to the west.

Following the start of the Battle of Okinawa, the 58th Division was placed directly under the China Expeditionary Army and ordered to retreat on 1 April 1945. On 18 April, Chinese forces in Guangxi began attacking the division as it retreated towards Nanjing, inflicting increasing casualties.

The 94th Independent Infantry Battalion, which was garrisoned approximately 30 km north-northeast of Liuzhou, was temporarily attached to the 3rd Division. It arrived in Nanning on 13 April 1945. The battalion was returned to the 58th Division on 26 May 1945 in Binyang County. The 13th Division, which was covering the neighbouring sector, began its retreat on 27 May. The 58th Division finally abandoned Liuzhou on 19 June 1945.

The 106th Independent Infantry Battalion of the 58th Division served as the rear guard of the Eleventh Army and left Luzhai County on 4 July 1945. Fighting with the pursuing Chinese forces ceased following Japan's surrender on 15 August 1945.

== See also ==
- List of Japanese Infantry Divisions

== Notes ==
- This article incorporates material from Japanese Wikipedia page 第58師団 (日本軍), accessed 9 June 2016

== Reference and further reading ==
- Madej, W. Victor. Japanese Armed Forces Order of Battle, 1937-1945 [2 vols]

Allentown, PA: 1981
