= Battle of Changsha (1939) order of battle =

The Battle of Changsha (1939) (September 17, 1939 – October 6, 1939) was an unsuccessful attempt by Japan to take the city of Changsha, China, during the second Sino-Japanese War.

The Japanese forces comprised 100,000 troops in 6 Divisions, in addition to many river-going vessels. The Chinese defenders numbered 160,000 troops in 5 Army Groups, 1 Army, and 7 Corps.

== Japan ==
Japan (Early September 1939)

- 11th Army - Yasuji Okamura
  - 6th Division - Lt. Gen. Shiro Inaba
    - 11th Infantry Brigade
      - 13th Infantry Regiment
      - 47th Infantry Regiment
    - 36th Infantry Brigade
      - 45th Infantry Regiment
      - 23rd Infantry Regiment
    - 6th Field Artillery Regiment
    - 6th Cavalry Regiment
    - 6th Engineer Regiment
    - 6th Transport Regiment
  - 106th Division - Lt. Gen. Ryotaro Nakai
    - 111th Infantry Brigade
      - 113th Infantry Regiment
      - 147th Infantry Regiment
    - 136th Infantry Brigade
      - 125th Infantry Regiment
      - 145th Infantry Regiment
    - 106th Field Artillery Regiment
    - 106th Cavalry Regiment
    - 106th Engineer Regiment
    - 106th Transport Regiment
  - 33rd Division - Lt. Gen. Shigetaro Amakasu
    - 33rd infantry Brigade Group:
      - 213th Infantry Regiment
      - 214th Infantry Regiment
      - 215th Infantry Regiment
    - 33rd Recon Regiment
    - 33rd Mountain Artillery Regiment
    - 33rd Military Engineer Regiment
    - 33rd Transport Regiment
  - 13th Division - Gen. Shizuichi Tanaka
    - Nara Detachment of 13th Division - Major Gen. Akira Nara
      - 26th Infantry Brigade - Major Gen. Akira Nara
        - 58th Infantry Regiment
        - 116th Infantry Regiment
  - With elements of:
    - 19th Mountain Artillery Regiment
    - 17th Cavalry Regiment
    - 13th Engineer Regiment
    - 13th Transport Regiment
  - 3rd Division - Lt. Gen. Shinichi Fujita
    - Uemura Detachment of 3rd Division - Major Gen. Mikio Uemura
      - 29th Infantry Brigade - Major Gen. Mikio Uemura
        - 18th Infantry Regiment
        - 34th Infantry Regiment
  - With elements of:
    - 3rd Field Artillery Regiment
    - 3rd Cavalry Regiment
    - 3rd Engineer Regiment
    - 3rd Transport Regiment
  - 101st Division - Yaheta Saito, s/b Lt. Gen. Masatoshi Saito
    - 101st Infantry Brigade
      - 101st Infantry Regiment
      - 149th Infantry Regiment
    - 102nd Infantry Brigade
      - 103rd Infantry Regiment
      - 157th Infantry Regiment
    - 101st Field Artillery Regiment
    - 101st Cavalry Regiment
    - 101st Engineer Regiment
    - 101st Transport Regiment

Naval Forces:

China Area Fleet

- 11th Sentai
- 13th Gunboat Unit
- Shanghai SNLF (a detachment)
- 4th Guard Unit

Notes:

- Naval forces were involved an opposed landing at the mouth of the Mi-lo River on the Hsiang River "enemy marines, elements of 3rd Division (Uemura Column /29th Bde), scores of ships and more than a 100 motor boats." Troops are identified on map 17 as the Muragami Column.

== China ==
(Early September 1939)

- 9th War Area - Chen Cheng
  - 19th Group Army - Lo Cho-ying
    - 32nd Army - Sun Ken-tang
      - 139th Division - Li Chao-ying
      - 141st Division - Tang Yung-hang
    - 49th Army - Liu Tuo-chuan
      - 105th Division - Wang Tieh-han
      - 9th Reserve Division - Chang Yen-chuan
  - 1st Group Army - Lu Han
    - 58th Army - Sun Tu
      - New 10th Division - Liu Cheng-fu
      - New 11th Division - Lu Tao-yuan
    - 60th Army - An En-pu
      - 183rd Division - Li Chao-ying
      - 184th Division - Wan Pao-pang
    - 2nd Advance Column - ?
      - 6th Kiangsi Preservation Regiment
  - 30th Group Army - Wang Ling-chi
    - 78th Army - Hsia Shou-hsun
      - New 13th Division - Liu Juo-pi
      - New 16th Division - Wu Shao-chuan
    - 72nd Army - Han Chuan-pu
      - New 14th Division - Chen Liang-chi
      - New 15th Division - Fu-yi
    - Hupei Hunan Border Area Advance Force - Fan Sung-pu
      - 8th Army - Li Yu-tang
        - 3rd Division - Chao His-tien
        - 197th Division - Ting Ping-chun
      - 3rd Advance Column - Chung Shih-pan
        - 4th Kiangsi Preservation Regiment - Cheng Chih-ching
        - 5th Kiangsi Preservation Regiment - Chung Shih-pan
        - 9th Kiangsi Preservation Regiment - Hsu Pu-chih
      - 1st Advance Column - Kung Ho-chung
        - Hupei Peace Preservation Regiment - Pi Tsung-yung
  - 27th Group Army - Yang Sen
    - 20th Army - Yang Han-yu
      - 133rd Division - Li Chao-ying
      - 134th Division - Yang Kan-tsai
  - 15th Group Army - Kuan Lin-cheng [acting]
    - 52nd Army - Chang Yao-ming
      - 2nd Division - Chao Kung-wa
      - 25th Division - Chang Han-chu
      - 195th Division - Chin Yi-chih
    - 37th Army - Chen Pei
      - 60th Division - Liang Chung-chiang
      - 95th Division - Lo Chi
    - 79th Army - Hsia Chu-chung
      - 98th Division - Wang Chia-pen
      - 82nd Division - Lo Chi-chiang
      - 140th Division - Li Tang
  - 20th Group Army - Shang Chen, Dep:Huo Kuei-chang
    - Tung-ting Garrison - Huo Kuei-chang
      - 53rd Army - Chou Fu-cheng
        - 116th Division - Chao Sao-tsung *
        - 130th Division - Chu Hung-hsun *
      - 54th Army - Chen Lieh
        - 14th Division - Chueh Han-chien
        - 50th Division - Chang Chun
        - 23rd Division - Sheng Feng-yao
    - 87th Army - Chou Hsiang-chu
      - 43rd Division - Chin Teh-yang
      - 198th Division - Wang Yu-ying
  - 73rd Army - Peng Wei-jen
    - 15th Division - Wang Chih-pin
    - 77th Division - Liu Chi-ming
  - 4th Army - Ou Chen
    - 59th Division - Chang The-neng
    - 90th Division - Chen Yung-chi
    - 102nd Division - Po Hui-chang
  - 70th Army - Li Chueh
    - 90th Division - Tang Po-yin
    - 107th Division - Tuan Heng *
  - New 6th Army - Chen Chiu-cheng
    - 5th Division - Tai Chi-tao *
    - 6th Division - Lung Yun-fei *
  - 74th Army - Wang Yao-wu
    - 51st Division - Li Tien-hsia
    - 57th Division - Shih Chung-cheng
    - 58th Division - Chen Shih
  - 5th Army - Tu Yu-ming
    - 1st Honor Division - Cheng Tung-kao
    - 200th Division - Tai An-lan
    - New 12th Division- Chiu Ching-chuan
  - 99th Army - Fu Chang-fang
    - 92nd Division - Liang Han-ming *** 76th Division - Wang Ling-yun *** 11th Division - Yey Pei-kao

Notes:

- * Uncommitted to battle in the campaign.

== See also ==
- National Revolutionary Army
- Imperial Japanese Army
