= 18th Independent Mixed Brigade =

The Imperial Japanese Army 18th Independent Mixed Brigade was an Independent Mixed Brigade formed November 7, 1939, in occupied China. It was assigned to the 11th Army. The unit was engaged in the Central Hupei Operation during the Second Sino-Japanese War. The brigade was re-organized as the 58th Division on 2 February 1942.

== Organization ==
The 18th Independent Mixed Brigade consisted of the following units.

- 92nd Independent infantry battalion
- 93rd Independent infantry battalion
- 94th Independent infantry battalion
- 95th Independent infantry battalion
- 96th independent infantry battalion
- artillery troops
- labor troops
- signal communication unit

== Commanders ==
- Lt. Gen Taka Kayashima 1939 - 1941

== See also ==
- IJA Independent Mixed Brigades
