= 60th Division (Imperial Japanese Army) =

- Active: 1942–1945
- Country: Empire of Japan
- Branch: Imperial Japanese Army
- Type: Infantry
- Size: 12,080
- Garrison/HQ: Shanghai
- Nickname: Pike Division
- Engagements: Second Sino-Japanese War

The 60th Division (第60師団, Dai-rokujū Shidan) was an infantry division of the Imperial Japanese Army. Its call sign was the Pike Division (矛兵団, Hoko Heidan). It was formed in Shanghai on 2 February 1942 as a Class C security division, alongside the 58th and 59th Divisions. The division was formed around the 11th Independent Mixed Brigade.

As a security division, the 60th Division consisted primarily of independent infantry battalions and had no artillery regiment. Its personnel were conscripted from Sakura. The division was permanently assigned to the 13th Army.

== Action ==
Upon its formation, the 60th Division assumed the security duties previously carried out by the 11th Independent Mixed Brigade. Its area of responsibility extended from Shanghai to Suzhou. On 10 August 1944, the 89th Independent Mixed Brigade was formed from elements of the 60th Division in Jinhua.

The 60th Division continued constructing fortifications in the area in preparation for a possible Allied landing at Shanghai. It was still engaged in this work when Japan surrendered on 15 August 1945.

Following the surrender of Japan, the division's personnel embarked on ships in Shanghai and returned to Sasebo and Fukuoka. The dissolution of the 60th Division was completed on 6 June 1946.

== See also ==
- List of Japanese Infantry Divisions
- Independent Mixed Brigades (Imperial Japanese Army)

== Notes and references ==
- This article incorporates material from Japanese Wikipedia page 第60師団 (日本軍), accessed 13 June 2016
- Madej, W. Victor. Japanese Armed Forces Order of Battle, 1937-1945 [2 vols]

Allentown, PA: 1981
