= Masaru Uesaka =

Imperial Japanese Army major general (1892–1982)

- 上坂 勝
- Born: May 22, 1892; Oita, Japan
- Died: July 5, 1982 (aged 90)
- Education: Imperial Japanese Army Academy
- Military career
- Allegiance: Empire of Japan
- Branch: Imperial Japanese Army
- Rank: Major general
- Units: North China Area Army; 110th Division; Kwantung Army; 34th Army; 59th Division
- Commands: Tainan Army Military District Headquarters; 163rd Infantry Regiment; 53rd Infantry Brigade
- Conflicts: Second Sino-Japanese War; Beiping–Hankou Railway Operation; World War II

Masaru Uesaka (上坂 勝, Uesaka Masaharu; 22 May 1892 – 5 July 1982) was a major general in the Imperial Japanese Army during World War II.

== Biography ==
Uesaka was born in Oita Prefecture, Japan, on 22 May 1892. He graduated from the 25th class of the Imperial Japanese Army Academy. On 1 August 1939, upon promotion to colonel, he assumed the post of head of the Tainan Army Military District Headquarters. In October 1941, he was transferred to serve as commander of the 163rd Infantry Regiment (North China Area Army, 110th Division, 133rd Infantry Brigade, later 110th Infantry Group) and was deployed to the Second Sino-Japanese War. He participated in the Beiping–Hankou Railway Operation, breaking through Haowangcheng and Dengfeng. Furthermore, in the capture of Luoyang, he achieved significant military success by defeating Tang Enbo. After the capture of Luoyang, he was tasked with garrison duties in Yiyang and Linru.

In May 1945, he was appointed commander of the 53rd Infantry Brigade (Kwantung Army, 34th Army, 59th Division), and on 10 June he was promoted to major general. Towards the end of the war, he was stationed in Hamhung. After the war, he was subject to internment in the Soviet Union.

In July 1950, after being captured in Siberia, he was handed over by the Soviet Union to the People's Republic of China in Suifenhe and interned in the Fushun War Criminals Management Centre. In June 1956, at the Shenyang Special Military Tribunal, he was sentenced to 18 years in prison, but was released early in August 1963.

== Bibliography ==
- 大澤武司 著 (2016). 毛沢東の対日戦犯裁判: 中国共産党の思惑と1526名の日本人. 中央公論新社. ISBN 4121024060.
- 福川秀樹 編著 (2001). 日本陸軍将官辞典. 芙蓉書房出版. ISBN 4829502738.
- 外山操 編 (1981). 陸海軍将官人事総覧 陸軍篇. 芙蓉書房出版. ISBN 4829500026.
