= Central Hubei Operation =

- Part of the Second Sino-Japanese War
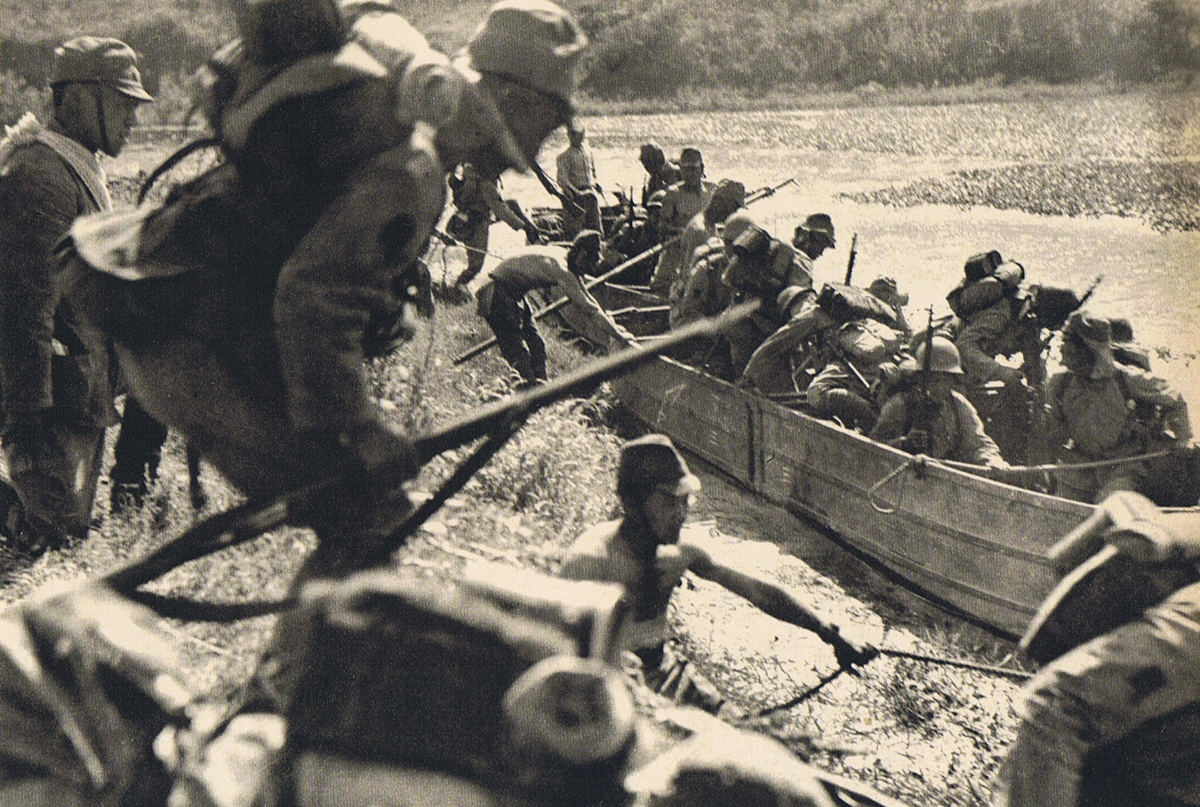
- IJA Ikeda Detachment June 1940
Date	November 25–30, 1940 (5 days)
Location	Central part of Hubei province in the Republic of China
Result	Both sides claimed victory. No territorial changes.

Belligerents
Republic of China	Empire of Japan

Commanders and leaders
(Republic of China (1912–1949)) Li Zongren	(Empire of Japan) Lt. Gen. Waichiro Sonobe

Strength
5th War Area: River West Army Group, Right Army Group, Central Army Group	11th Army: 3rd, 4th, 15th, 17th, 39th, 40th Divisions, 18th Independent Mixed Brigade

Casualties and losses
Japanese Claim : 6,439 killed and 474 captured Chinese Claim : 33rd Army Group (77th Corps and the attached 30th Corps) : 23 officers and 774 soldiers killed; 41 officers and 1,286 soldiers wounded; 7 officers and 444 soldiers missing; 22nd Army Group : 41st Corps : 1,550+ casualties 45th Corps : 439 officers and soldiers killed; 647 officers and soldiers wounded; 72 soldiers missing; 29th Army Group : 20 officers and 721 soldiers killed; 33 officers and 944 soldiers wounded; 115 soldiers missing; Total : 7,100+ casualties	Chinese Claim : Over 5,000 KIA; 7,000–8,000 WIA Japanese Claim: 132 killed and 455 wounded.

The Central Hubei Operation was one of the engagements between the National Revolutionary Army and Imperial Japanese Army during the Second Sino-Japanese War. Known as the Central Hubei Operation, East and West of Hsiang River, in Japan it is called the 漢水作戦 (Han River Operation). The battle lasted from 25 to 30 November 1940.

After the battle of Zaoyang-Yichang in the summer of 1940, the Japanese controlled I-chang and Sha-shih. The Chinese controlled the area east and west of the Hsiang River. Their lines extended from the southwest of Yuan-an via Ching-men, north of Chung-hsiang, and the foothills of Ta-hung Shan, to the area northwest of Sui Hsien astride both banks of the Hsiang River. The Wu-tang Mountains were on the right and the Tung-po Mountains on the left.

In coordination with the guerrilla forces in the southeast, the Chinese repeatedly struck at the Japanese forces that had penetrated to I-chang. As a result, the Chinese believed that the Japanese forces at I-chang and Sha-shih found their flanks exposed and in a difficult position. To relieve themselves of this threat they launched an offensive against the Chinese forces in late November. Japanese sources say the purpose was to probe to find the location of the Army of Tang Enbo. If that was their purpose they were to be disappointed.

== Preparations ==
During early November the Japanese made preparations for their attack, repairing and constructing roads, bridges, defense works and airfields. Rations, ammunition, metal and rubber boats, were stored in the vicinity of Chung-hsiang. They also brought in additional troops into the area west of the Xiang River, estimated at five regiments bringing their strength to the equivalent of three Divisions. To the east at the Japanese increased their strength to a full division (3rd Division) at Sui Hsien along the Hsiang - Hua highway. They further brought in supporting units of tanks and artillery in these areas.

On 23 November the Japanese 11th Army preparations were complete and their unit deployed in their attack positions in five major forces:

- Kayashima Force at Tang-yang composed of the 18th Independent Mixed Brigade and elements of the 4th Division under Lt. Gen Taka Kayashima commander of the 18th Independent Mixed Brigade.
- Murakami Force, at Chingmen, the 39th Division under its commander Lt. Gen Keisaku Murakami.
- Hirabayashi Force, at Chung-hsiang, composed of a portion of the 17th Division and Kurahashi Detachment (the detached 60th Infantry Regiment from 15th Division) under the commander of 17th Division, Lt-General Morito Hirabayashi.
- Kitano Force north of Ching-shan in the vicinity of modern Shuanghe, composed of a portion of the 4th Division and the Kususe Armored force (7th and 13th Tank Regiments) under Lt. Gen Kenzo Kitano commander of the 4th Division.
- Teshima Force at Sui Hsien composed of the 3rd Division under its commander Lt. General Fusataro Teshima.

Li Zongren recognizing the Japanese build up foretold an attack, had his 5th War Area alerted. He ordered the River West Army Army Group (30th and 77th Corps), Right Army Group (44th and 67th Corps) and Central Army Group (41st and 45th Corps) to checking the coming Japanese advance by counterattacks on the flanks of their advancing columns when the opportunity presented itself.

== The Offensive ==
On the morning of 25 November, the Japanese began their attack in several columns. On the Western Front between the Hsiang River and Tang-yang, over 1,000 Japanese from the Kayashima Force, advanced northward from Tang-yang toward Hengtien, and broke through the gap between the positions of the 179th and 37th Divisions of the Chinese 77th Corps at Yang-chi-ai.

Over 3,000 Japanese from Murakami Force from Ching-men broke through the positions of the 27th Division of the Chinese 30th Corps toward Yen-chih-miao. Meanwhile, the Japanese Kitano Force moving northwest from Chu-chia-fu to Tung-lin-ling and divided into several columns to drive north deep into the Chinese position at Liang-shui-ching, Hsia-chia-tzu, and northeast toward Kuai-huo-pu. At night, the River West Army Group swung reserves into blocking positions from Heng-tien to Yen-chih-miao and Kuai-huo-pu.

On 26 November, the Murakami Force reached Hsien-chu. On 27 November the Murakami Force attacked Liu-hou-chi and the two columns of Kitano Force attacked Li-chia-tang, both fighting bitterly for a day against the Chinese 30th Corps reserve, the 30th Division under Liu Chen-shan, who halted their advance. At dusk the Chinese 30th Corps launched a counterattack in force with elements of the 31st and 27th Divisions striking the Japanese rear areas. Unable to withstand this attack the Japanese retreated toward Ching-men and Chung-hsiang, with the Chinese in pursuit.

Meanwhile, east of the Hsiang River on the Ching-Chung Highway Front the Japanese Hirabayashi Force massed more than 3,000 men in an attack on Changshoudien and Wang-chia-tien attempting to encircle the Chang-chia-chi - Wu-lung-kuan line. On 26 November, the Japanese reinforced to 5,000 men, advanced a force east to San-li-kang, while the main force attacked Pien-chai, Wang-chia-ho and Yu-nan-men. Heavy fighting lasted until darkness ended the clash in a stalemate. On 27 November the Chinese 44th Corps counterattacked from Wang-chia-ho. Its converging attack with the main force of the 67th Corps towards the northwest, caused heavy casualties to the Japanese.

On 25 November the Japanese Teshima Force on the Sui Hsien Front launched a violent attack with a column of 2,000 men from Liang-chui-kou on the Chinese 123rd Division at Lishan. Two additional columns of more than 1000 men each advanced west toward Ho-yuan-tien and Ching-ming-pu. By darkness, the Japanese reinforced. On 26 November the Japanese fought a bitter battle with the Chinese 124th and 127th Divisions at Chin-chi Shan and Ching-ming-pu. Another Japanese force of 700–800 men moved from Hsi-ho via Lang-ho-tien to Tang-chia-fan. Having been attacked by the 41st Corps, the Japanese in the vicinity of Ching-ming-pu linked up with their force at Chin-chi Shan and moved to the vicinity of Ho-yuantien on 27 November. At night, the Japanese force near Tang-chia-fan reached the vicinity of Huan-tan Chen to confront the Chinese 125th Division.

Since its objective was to break the Japanese force 5th War Area command directed its forces to keep secure key localities and take advantage of mountainous terrain to conduct ambushes to stop the invaders. Heavy fighting lasted until 28 November when the Japanese retreated. Chinese forces west of the Hsiang River continued their pursuit. The Japanese force in front of the Chinese Right Army Group was routed on the same day, retreating by several routes. Subjected to a converging attack by Chinese forces of the Central Army Group, the Japanese forces facing them in the area of Ho-yuan-tien, and Huan-tan Chen, fell back to high ground in the vicinity of Ho-yuan-tien and Tang-chia-fan and were encircled by the Chinese.

The Japanese pulled a further 1,500–1600 infantry and cavalry from Sui Hsien and Yingshan via Shang-shih-tien and Sha-tien for a turning movement against the Chinese to retrieve the situation. Once again, the Japanese were ambushed. Under cover of airplanes and armour, the Japanese retreated toward Sui Hsien and Hsi-ho, as Chinese forces attacked along the line from Chun-chuan to Anchu, Li-shan, and Kao-cheng. On 30 November, the Chinese Army Groups recovered their original positions.

== Results ==
The Chinese claimed that the Japanese suffered over 5,000 dead and 7,000–8,000 wounded. Some 1,000 Japanese bodies were left in the field according to Chinese sources. The Japanese hoped to have a victory at the time of the establishment of the Wang Ching-wei regime so as to dampen Chinese morale. The effect was the opposite of what was hoped. On the other side, the Japanese Army recorded this battle as a small-scale operation that was launched as a pre-emptive strike to a possible Chinese counteroffensive. The 3rd Division had requested that the operation be expanded to the south bank of the Yellow River but this was rejected. By December 2, the Japanese Army believed that the Chinese Fifth War Zone in the area had bene defeated and all units returned to their original positions, reporting to have engaged with 76,260 Chinese troops and claiming 6,439 abandoned enemy corpses and 474 POWs while suffering 132 killed and 445 wounded.
