= Battle of Changsha (1939) =

Battle of the Second Sino-Japanese War

Coordinates: 28.2000°N 112.9670°E

- Part of the Second Sino-Japanese War
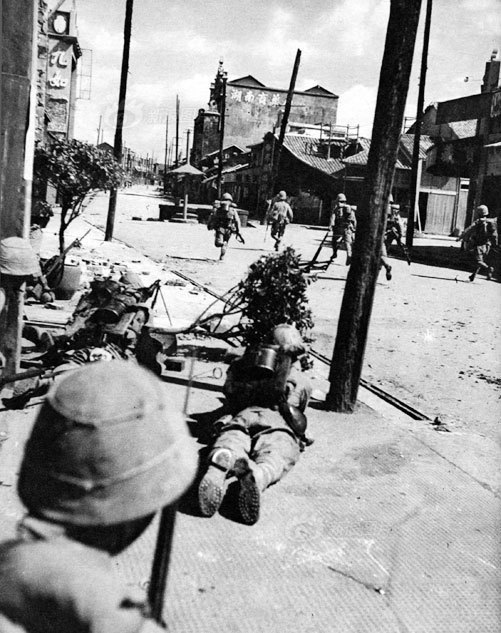
- Japanese soldiers during the battle of Changsha
Date	September 14 – October 13, 1939 (4 weeks and 1 day) or September 17 – October 6, 1939 (2 weeks and 5 days)
Location	Changsha city and proximity in the Republic of China
Result	Chinese victory

Belligerents
Republic of China	Empire of Japan

Commanders and leaders
(Republic of China (1912–1949)) Xue Yue (Republic of China (1912–1949)) Chen Cheng (Republic of China (1912–1949)) Guan Linzheng (Republic of China (1912–1949)) Yang Sen	(Empire of Japan) Yasuji Okamura (Empire of Japan) Masatoshi Saito (Empire of Japan) Ryotaro Nakai (Empire of Japan) Shinichi Fujita (Empire of Japan) Shiro Inaba (Empire of Japan) Shizuichi Tanaka (Empire of Japan) Shigetaro Amakasu

Units involved
Order of battle	Order of battle

Strength
~240,000 troops in 5 Army Groups, 1 Army, and 7 Corps divided between 30 Divisions in total.	~120,000 troops in the 11th Army split between 6 Divisions; 12 naval ships 100+ aircraft 100+ motor boats

Casualties and losses
Western claim: 20,000 killed and wounded Chinese claim: 40,193 killed, wounded, or missing (Note: Including losses of the 25th division in guerilla fighting from the second half of August to the first half of September 1939) Japanese claim: 44,000 killed 4,000 captured	Western estimates: 30,000–50,000 killed, wounded and missing Chinese claim: 33,480 killed or wounded Japanese claim: 850 killed 2,700 wounded

The First Battle of Changsha (17 September 1939 – 6 October 1939; Chinese: 第一次長沙會戰) was the first of four attempts by Japan to take the city of Changsha, Hunan, during the second Sino-Japanese War. Coming two weeks after Germany's invasion of Poland on September 1, it was the first major battle of the war to fall within the time frame of what is widely considered World War II.

== Background and strategy ==
The war had reached a stalemate after two years of fighting. Professor Fu Sinian noted in July 1939 that while the Chinese army had become stronger, the Japanese army had weakened.

On 15 August, the 11th Army came up with the general plans for a campaign south of the Yangtze, ranging 250 kilometers (160 mi) from the Xiang River (Xiangjiang) to the Gan River. In early September, Japanese General Toshizō Nishio of the "Japanese Expeditionary Forces to China" and Lieutenant-General Seishirō Itagaki set out to capture Changsha, the provincial capital of Hunan. The Japanese 101st and 106th Divisions were deployed on the western bank of the Gan River in northern Jiangxi, and the 6th, 3rd, 13th, and 33rd Divisions marched southward from southern Hubei to northern Hunan.

Two of the primary motivating factors for the Japanese in launching the attack were the signing of a non-aggression pact by their German ally with their Soviet enemy, and their defeat by Soviet forces at Nomonhan. A large attack on the Chinese would therefore restore morale. In addition, Germany's invasion of Poland starting on 1 September 1939 gave the Japanese further motivation to crush China's will to fight in order to pave the way for the establishment of Wang Jingwei's puppet government in Central China.

Altogether, it became obvious that the 100,000 strong Japanese force was to converge on Changsha. The Chinese strategy was to counter the enemy column in northern Jiangxi and then encircle the line on the path southward.

== Battle ==
On the night of 14 September 1939, Lieutenant General Ryotaro Nakai's 106th Division drove westward from north of Fengxin, Jiangxi, against Wan Baobang's 184th Division of the Chinese 60th Corps. After fierce fighting, the defending forces abandoned Gao'an. The bulk of Japanese forces then moved northwest to assault Shangfu (上富), Ganfang (甘坊), and Xiushui (秀水). In coordination with Nakai, Lieutenant General Jutaro Amakasu's 33rd Division assaulted Guan Linzheng's 15th Army Group from the south.

Having recently captured important strategic locations in Jiangxi Province, Japanese troops began their attacks on Changsha in earnest on 17 September. The Japanese 101st Division (Lieutenant General Masatoshi Saito) and 106th Division started marching westward towards Changsha in neighboring Hunan Province. Meanwhile, the 3rd Division (Lieutenant General Shinichi Fujita), 6th Division (Lieutenant General Shiro Inaba), 13th Division (General Shizuichi Tanaka), and 33rd Division invaded northern Hunan Province to put additional pressure on Changsha. However, the Japanese stretched too far out westward and were counter-attacked by Chinese forces from the south and the north, forcing them to retreat eastward.

On 19 September, Japanese forces proceeded to attack Chinese defensive positions along the Xinqiang River with poison gas on a wide scale. Japan had not signed the Geneva Protocol (1925).

After having recovered Cunqianjie on 19 September, Wang Yaowu's 74th Corps (51D, 57D, & 58D) and Song Ketang's 32nd Corps (139D & 141D) retook Gao'an in a counterattack on 22 September.

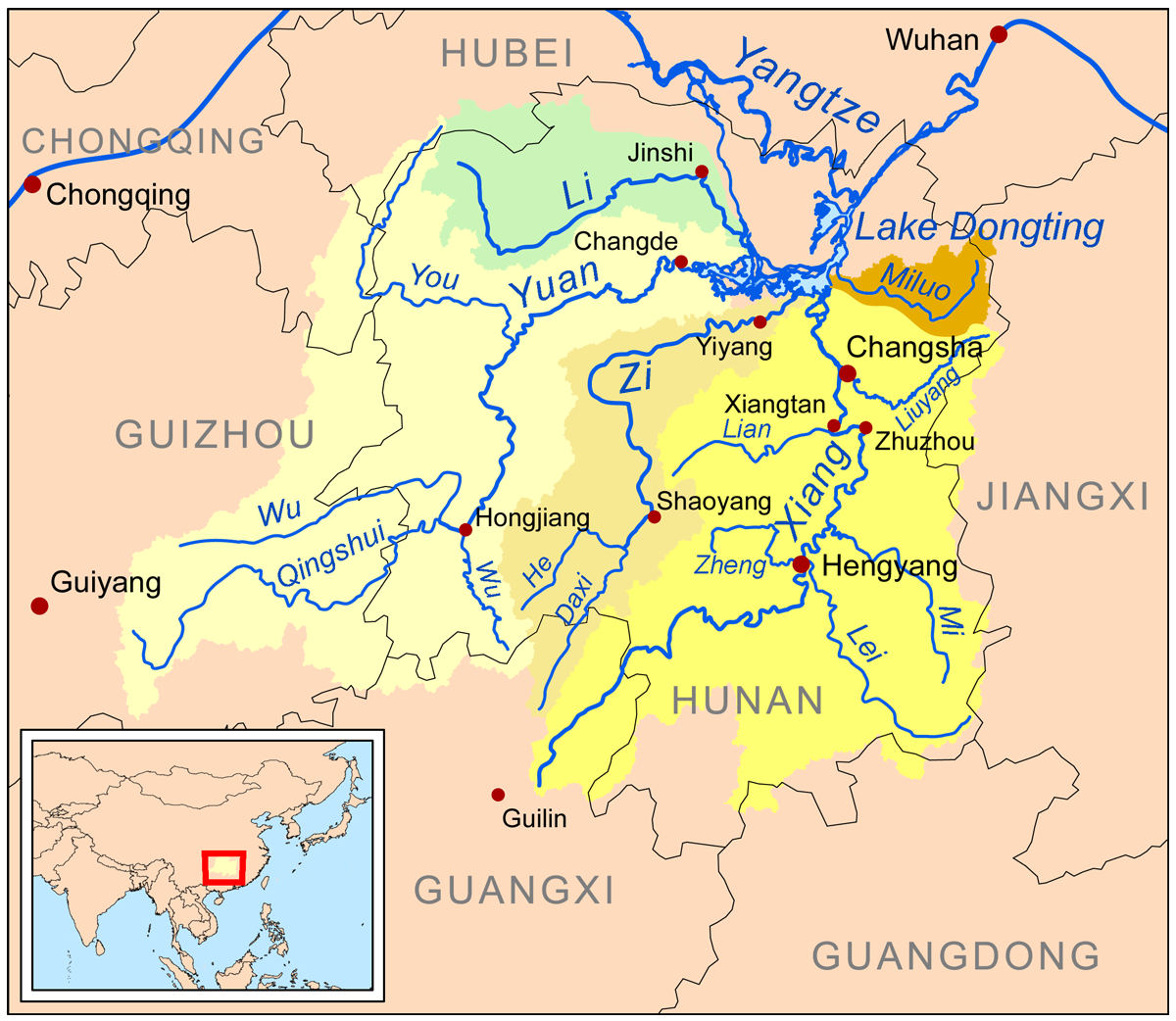
Dongting Rivers

Battle of Changsha 二戰紀錄片

On 23 September Japanese forces drove the Chinese out of the Xinqiang river area, and the 6th and 13th Divisions crossed the river under a cover of heavy artillery, advancing further south along the Miluo River. East of Changsha, naval vessels landed the Shanghai Special Naval Landing Forces and portions of the 3rd Division, surrounding Changsha on three sides.

Heavy fighting continued afterwards and the Chinese retreated southward as distraction for the Japanese while supporting battalions arrived on the east and the west for an encirclement maneuver.

The Chinese defenders had decided beforehand on flexible, guerilla-style tactics to wear down Japanese manpower and supplies through ambushes and harassing maneuvers. Per General Chen Cheng's orders, the objective was "to lure the enemy into the vicinity of Changsha for a decisive battle."

To deny the Japanese any supplies, the Chinese implemented scorched earth policies and evacuated local civilians into the hills.

By 29 September, vanguard troops of the Japanese 6th Division had reached the outskirts of Changsha. However, a night attack the next day resulted in the Japanese advance finding themselves surrounded by "60,000 screaming Chinese on their front, rear and both flanks," as an American military observer reported.

Due to the heavy casualties they had incurred, estimated in the tens of thousands with a significant portion being fatalities, as well as the dangerous possibility of their overstretched supply lines being completely severed by encirclement, the Japanese forces were forced to withdraw across the Laodao River. Acting group army commander Guan Linzheng issued orders at once for 52nd and 73rd Corps to pursue the Japanese to Miluo River. General Xue Yue ordered a general counterattack on 3 October in pursuit of the Japanese who were south of Chongyang and Yueyang. The Chinese, having brought up artillery pieces to the front, bombarded the retreating Japanese columns.

On 5 October, Chinese troops shot down a Japanese aircraft with orders from General Yasuji Okamura to call off the Changsha offensive, and the nearby Chinese 23rd Division attacked a Japanese Navy port at Yingtian (now Miluo), damaging several vessels. By 6 October, Japanese forces at Changsha were decimated and retreating. Two days later, the remnants fled northward over the Miluo River while the Chinese 195th Division of the 52nd Corps pursued them across the Xinqiang River to recapture their former forward positions. At night, the Chinese launched raids into Xitang and Yaolin.

By 10 October, Chinese forces had completely regained their former territories in northern Hunan Province, southern Hubei Province and northern Jiangxi Province.

== Casualties ==
The Japanese claimed that their attack on Changsha had only been a spoiling attack, never meant to occupy Changsha permanently. They claimed to have lost only 850 killed and 2,700 wounded, whilst also claiming to have killed 44,000 Chinese soldiers and captured 4,000.

Foreign military observers estimated Chinese losses at much lower at some 20,000 killed and wounded, whilst also claiming Japanese casualties of around 30,000. Military historian Micheal Clodfelter estimates a total of around 50,000 Japanese casualties sustained in the fighting.

== Conclusion ==
Changsha was the first major city to successfully repel Japanese advances. Retaining the city allowed the Nationalist Chinese forces to prevent the Japanese from consolidating their territories in Southern China.

== See also ==
- Battle of Changsha (1941)
- Battle of Changsha (1941–1942)
- Battle of Changsha (1944)
- Battle of Changsha (TV series), the TV series depicting this event
