= Yasuji Okamura =

Imperial Japanese Army general (1884–1966)

- 岡村 寧次
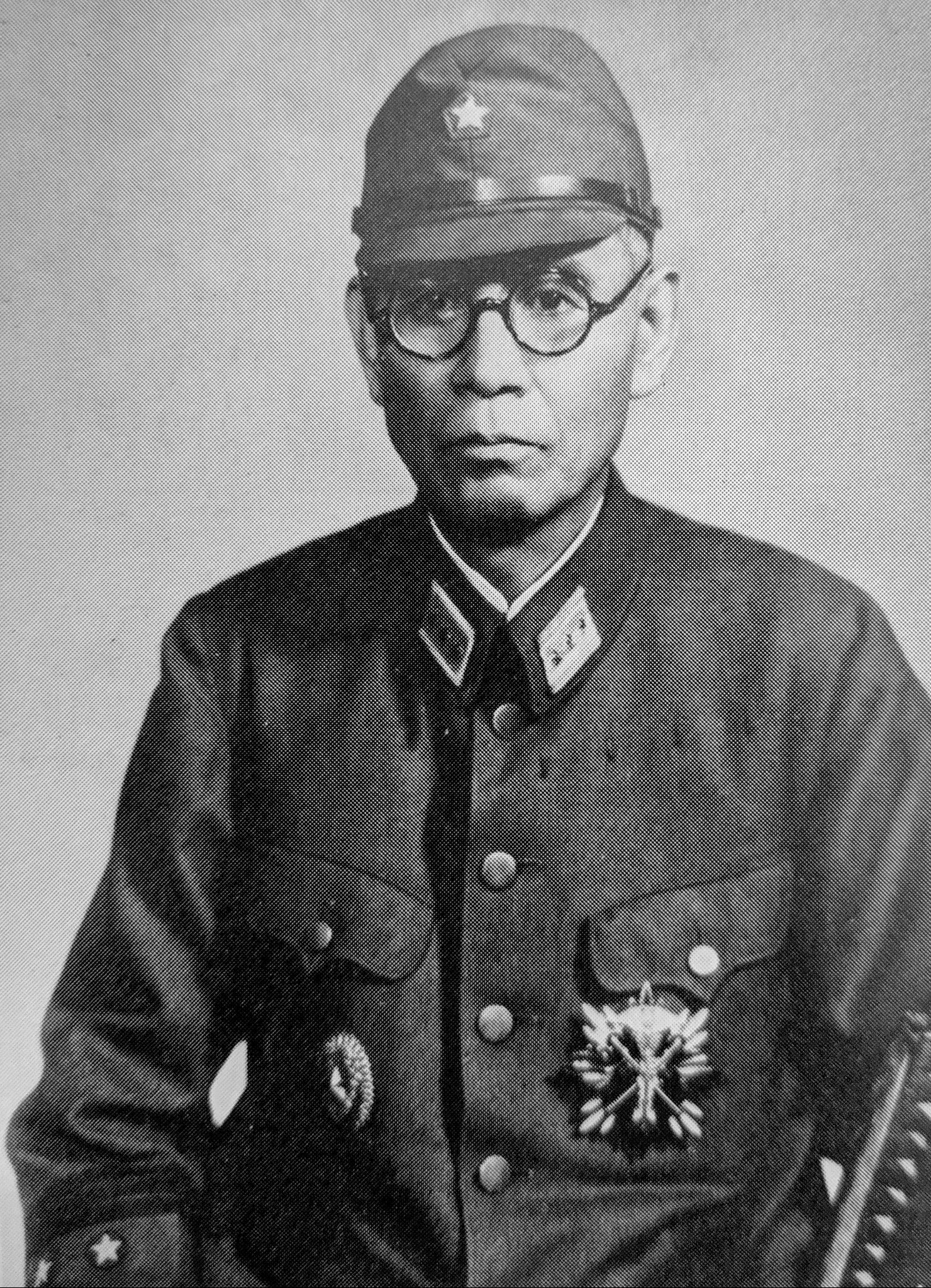
- Born: 15 May 1884; Tokyo, Japan
- Died: 2 September 1966 (aged 82); Tokyo, Japan
- Education: Imperial Japanese Army Academy; Army War College
- Military career
- Allegiance: Empire of Japan; Republic of China (military advisor)
- Branch: Imperial Japanese Army
- Service years: 1904–1945
- Rank: General
- Units: 1st Infantry Regiment, Imperial Japanese Army General Staff, 14th Infantry Regiment, Kwantung Army
- Commands: 6th Infantry Regiment, China Expeditionary Army, Northern China Area Army, 11th Army, 2nd Division
- Conflicts: Russo-Japanese War; World War I; Second Sino-Japanese War; Battle of Wuhan; Operation Ichi-Go; Chinese Civil War
- Awards: Order of the Sacred Treasure, 1st Class; Order of the Golden Kite, 1st Class; Order of the Rising Sun, Grand Cordon; Victory Medal; Military Medal of Honor
- Other work: Military attaché, advisor, author

Yasuji Okamura (岡村 寧次, Okamura Yasuji; 15 May 1884 – 2 September 1966) was a general of the Imperial Japanese Army, commander-in-chief of the China Expeditionary Army from November 1944 to the end of World War II, and appointed to surrender all Japanese forces involved in the China Burma India theater. After the war, he was tried but found not guilty of any war crimes by the Shanghai War Crimes Tribunal. As one of the Imperial Japanese Army's top China experts, Okamura spent his entire military career on the Asian mainland.

== Biography ==
=== Early life ===
Born in Tokyo in 1884, Okamura enrolled in Sakamachi Elementary School and graduated eight years later. In 1897, he entered Waseda Junior High School. In 1898, he was transferred to Tokyo Junior Army School, and was transferred to Army Central Junior School later. Okamura entered the 16th class of the Imperial Japanese Army Academy in 1899 and graduated in 1904. His classmates included the future generals Itagaki Seishiro, Kenji Doihara and Ando Rikichi. He was commissioned a second lieutenant in the IJA 1st Infantry Regiment. In 1907, he was promoted to lieutenant and was assigned to the Army Academy to assist with the training of cadets from China.

In 1910, Okamura entered the 25th class of the Army War College, and was promoted to captain soon after graduation in 1913. He served in a number of staff positions on the Imperial Japanese Army General Staff Office during and after World War I including an assignment to Beijing in June 1914. From June to December 1921, he was sent as a military attaché to the United States and Europe. While at Baden-Baden in Germany, he met with Tetsuzan Nagata, Toshiro Obata and Hideki Tojo, laying the foundation for the Tōseiha political clique within the Japanese Army. On his return to Japan, he was assigned to the 14th Infantry Regiment.

In 1923, He was assigned to China and served as a military advisor to Chinese warlord general Sun Chuanfang, in this capacity, he gathered many vital information and war maps, which later were used in the military operations of the Second Sino-Japanese War. He was promoted to colonel in July 1927 and returned to Japan to command the IJA 6th Infantry Regiment.

From August 1929, Okamura was appointed as Assistant Director of Human Resources Bureau in the Ministry of the Army. He was involved in the March incident, a failed coup d'etat attempt to establish a military dictatorship headed by General Kazushige Ugaki, but received no punishment.

The same year on 31 May, he reached the conclusion of the Heiwa and Tanggu Agreement, which was the plenipotentiary of the National Government Army.

From 1932 to 1933, Okamura was Deputy chief-of-staff of the Shanghai Expeditionary Army under the aegis of the Kwantung Army. According to Okamura's own memoirs, he played a role in the recruitment of comfort women from Nagasaki Prefecture to serve in military brothels in Shanghai.

He served as military attaché to Manchukuo from 1933 to 1934, and played a role in the negotiations for the Tanggu Truce between Japan and China.

Okamura was promoted to lieutenant general in 1936, and assigned command of the IJA 2nd Division.

== Second Sino-Japanese War ==
In 1938, a year after the Marco Polo Bridge incident, Okamura was assigned as the commander in chief of the Japanese Eleventh Army, which participated in numerous major engagements in the Second Sino-Japanese War, notably the Battles of Wuhan, Nanchang and Changsha. According to historians Yoshiaki Yoshimi and Seiya Matsuno, Okamura was authorized by Emperor Hirohito to use chemical weapons during those battles.

In April 1940, Okamura was promoted to the rank of full general. In July 1941, he was appointed the commander-in-chief of the Northern China Area Army. Since the end of 1938, the North China Area Army had waged brutal campaigns of annihilation against guerillas in the area, which the Chinese Communist Party came to label as the "Three Alls Policy" adopted by the Japanese, the three being "burn all, kill all, steal all". (Note: The Three Alls Policy was not an official Japanese military policy, but rather a Chinese term referring to the scorched-earth policy (Japanese: 燼滅作戦, Hepburn: Jinmetsu Sakusen) The term was later spread in Japan by detained soldiers returning from China.) Okamura continued the annihilation campaigns begun by his predecessors, calling for the targeting and encirclement of the communist Eighth Route Army. To accomplish this, North China was divided into pacified, semi-pacified, and unspecified areas—the latter being cut off by trenches and made uninhabitable. In December 1941, Okamura received Imperial General Headquarters Order Number 575, which directed his theatre army to "strengthen the containment of the enemy and destroy their will to continue fighting". Okamura's implementation of this order resulted in further annihilation campaigns that saw villages burned down, grain confiscated, the use of forced labor and the relocation of Chinese peasants, resulting in an estimated 2.47+ million Chinese non-combatants killed.

Conversely, historian Eguchi Keiichi notes that Okamura himself had proclaimed a motto of "Destroy Communism, Love the People" (滅共愛民) and issued three commandments of "Do not burn, do not violate, do not kill" to his men. Okamura had these three commandments written in a pamphlet which was distributed to all of his forces on April 8, 1942. Eguchi concluded that the Three Alls Policy would not entirely cease under Okamura's command and brutal annihilation campaigns persisted, citing the Southern Shandong Communist Eradication Operation (魯南剿共作戦) as one example—which resulted in over 5,000 dead and numerous facilities destroyed, including two hospitals and an elementary school.

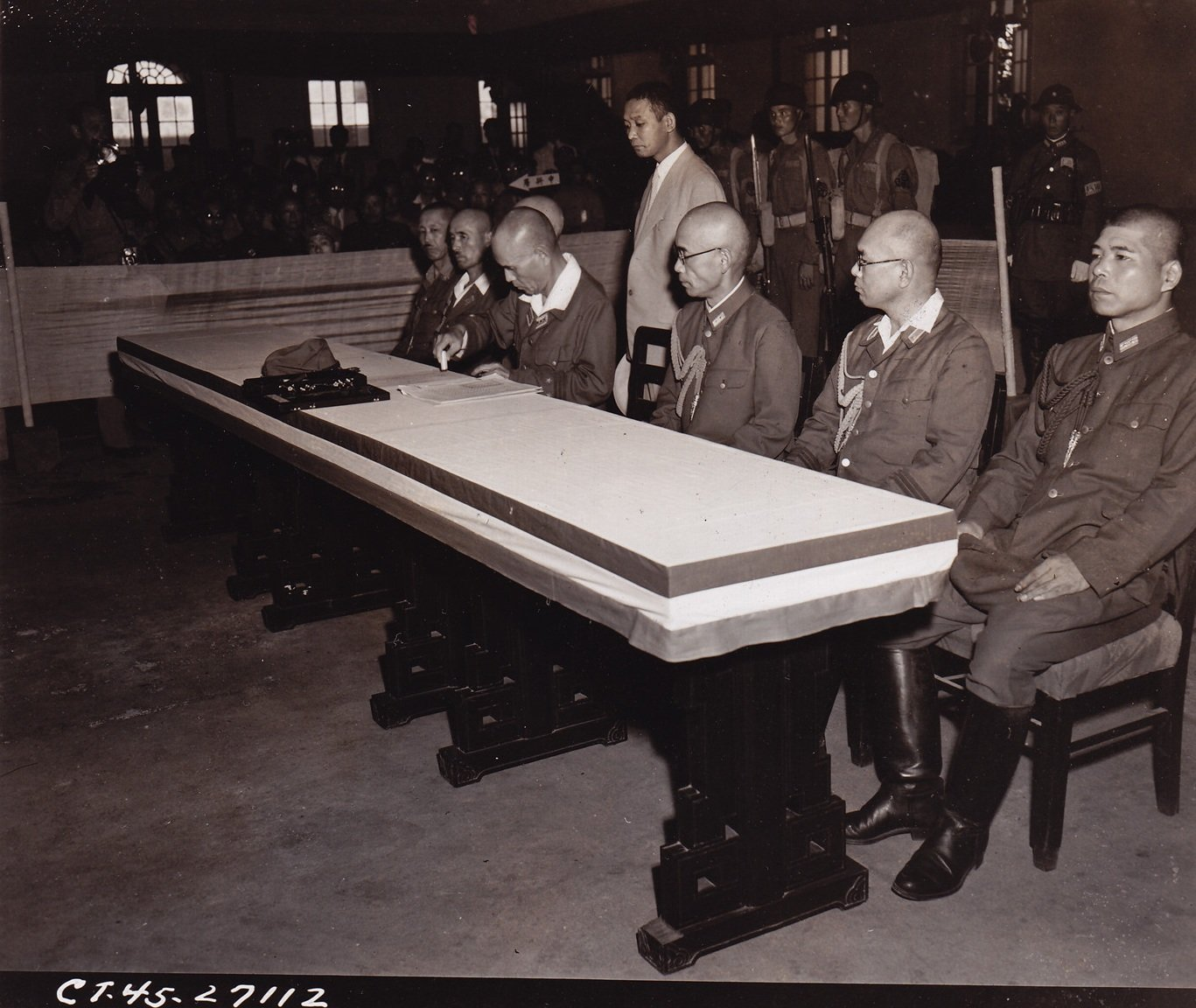
Okamura (fourth from right) during the surrender of Japan at Nanjing

In 1944, Okamura was the commander of Operation Ichi-Go against airfields in China, while retaining command of the Japanese Sixth Area Army. A few months later, he was appointed the commander-in-chief of the China Expeditionary Army. On 6 April to 9 June 1945, Okamura was defeated by the Chinese in the Battle of West Hunan. Japan also lost the Second Guangxi campaign in April to 21 August 1945 and was expelled from their last position in Guangxi province which was the last battle fought between the Chinese and Japanese. With the surrender of Japan on 15 August 1945, Okamura represented the Imperial Japanese Army in the official surrender ceremony of the China Burma India Theater held at Nanjing on 9 September 1945. The Chinese representative at the surrender was General He Yingqin, Okamura's opposite during the Tanggu Truce negotiations.

== Post-war life ==
After the war, Okamura was found not guilty of any war crimes in January 1949 by the Shanghai War Crimes Tribunal. Nationalist leader Chiang Kai-shek then retained him as a military adviser for the Nationalist Government.

While he was questioned by the investigators, he testified about the Nanking massacre:

"I surmised the following based on what I heard from Staff Officer Miyazaki, CCAA Special Service Department Chief Harada and Hangzhou Special Service Department Chief Hagiwara a day or two after I arrived in Shanghai. First, it is true that tens of thousands of acts of violence, such as looting and rape, took place against civilians during the assault on Nanking. Second, front-line troops indulged in the evil practice of executing POWs on the pretext of (lacking) rations."

The Nationalist regime of Chiang Kai-Shek intervened to protect Okamura from repeated American requests that he testify at the Tokyo war crimes trial.

Okamura remained as an advisor to the Nationalist government until he was decommissioned in January 1949 and returned to Japan. He was active in the post-war era as advisor to the National Bereaved Family Support Association and also formed a group of retired military officers with Chinese experience called the "Paidan", which continued to provide informal support for the Chinese Nationalist government until his death in 1966.

== Bibliography ==
- Bix, Herbert P. (2001). Hirohito and the Making of Modern Japan. Harper Perennial. ISBN 0-06-093130-2.
- Dupuy, Trevor N. (1992). Encyclopedia of Military Biography. I B Tauris. ISBN 1-85043-569-3 – via Archive Foundation.
- Fuller, Richard (1992). Shokan: Hirohito's Samurai. London: Arms and Armor. ISBN 1-85409-151-4 – via Archive Foundation.
- Hayashi, Saburo; Coox, Alvin D. (1959). Kogun: The Japanese Army in the Pacific War. Quantico, VA: The Marine Corps Association. OCLC 1133179.

Military offices
Preceded by Yoshijirō Umezu	Commander, 2nd Division; March 1936-June 1938	Succeeded by Tōji Yasui
Preceded by post created	Commander, Eleventh Army; June 1938-March 1940	Succeeded by Waichirō Sonobe
Preceded by Hideki Tojo	Military Councillor; March 1940-July 1941	Succeeded by Kenji Doihara
Preceded by Hayao Tada	Commander, North China Area Army; July 1941 – August 1944	Succeeded by Naozaburo Okabe
Preceded by post created	Commander, Sixth Area Army; August 1944-November 1944	Succeeded by Naozaburo Okabe
Preceded by Shunroku Hata	Commander-in-Chief, China Expeditionary Army; November 1944–August 1945	Succeeded by none
