= Masaru Okunishi =

Japanese murderer

Masaru Okunishi (奥西勝, Okunishi Masaru; born January 14, 1926 – October 4, 2015) was a convicted murderer who was on death row in Japan for 46 years.

== Life ==
Masaru Okunishi lived in the remote mountain village of Kuzuo near Nabari. He was employed by Japanese National Railways from 1942 to 1944, and from 1944 to 1945 he was a soldier in World War II. He then took up farming. In 1947 he married a woman named Chieko, and they had a son and a daughter.

Okunishi fatally poisoned five women, including his wife, on March 28, 1961. The victims had drunk sake that had been mixed with pesticides. Twelve other people survived, but also showed symptoms of having been poisoned.

At his first trial, Okunishi retracted his confession to the act, which he said had been made under pressure from police. He was acquitted in December 1964 for lack of evidence, but after an appeal by the prosecution he was found guilty and sentenced to death in September 1969. The judgment was upheld by the Supreme Court of Japan on 15 June 1972. Okunishi subsequently appealed the verdict seven times. The Nagoya Criminal Court granted his request for a retrial, but in April 2005 the case was dismissed.

Okunishi was diagnosed with stomach cancer in 2003. He was transferred from the Nagoya Prison to the Hachiōji Prison Hospital in June 2012, and died in that hospital in October 2015, at the age of 89.

== See also ==
- "Innocence Overturned" http://www.jiadep.org/Nabari.html
- Iwao Hakamada (spent 46 years on death row)
