= Yoshio Shinozuka =

Japanese Imperial Army soldier (1923–2014)

Yoshio Shinozuka (篠塚良雄; 1923 – 20 April 2014) was a Japanese Imperial Army soldier who served as an army medic with a top secret biological warfare group called Unit 731 in World War II. He was a member of the Association of Returnees from China.

== Wartime service in Unit 731 ==
According to his testimony, he was conscripted into Unit 731 at the age of 16. Shinozuka claimed to have been involved in conducting experiments and vivisections on Chinese captives near the northern Chinese city of Harbin. He was held in detention in China for over a decade, finally being released in 1956.

== Testimony regarding war crimes ==
In 1997, Shinozuka gave testimony on the activities of Unit 731 on behalf of 180 Chinese who were suing the Japanese government for compensation and an apology for deaths of family members they claimed were killed in experiments at the biological warfare laboratory. "I was a member of Unit 731 and I have done what no human being should ever do", Shinozuka said.

In 1998, he wanted to give a speech at a peace conference in the United States and Canada. However, the government administrations denied his entry into their countries claiming it was because there may be controversy in the United States.
