= Sixth Area Army =

- Active: August 25, 1944 - August 15, 1945
- Country: Empire of Japan
- Branch: Imperial Japanese Army
- Type: Infantry
- Role: Field Army
- Garrison/HQ: Hankou
- Nickname(s): 統 (tō = “unity”)

The Sixth Area Army (第6方面軍, Dai roku hōmen gun) was a field army of the Imperial Japanese Army during both the Second Sino-Japanese War and World War II.

== History ==
The Japanese 6th Area Army was formed on August 25, 1944 under the China Expeditionary Army primarily as a military reserve and garrison force for the occupation of the central provinces of China between the Yangtze River and the Yellow River. After the success of Operation Ichi-Go, many veteran units were transferred out of China to fronts in the Pacific War, which left the 6th Area Army to guard gains in central China. The 6th Area Army was demobilized at the surrender of Japan on August 15, 1945 at Hankou (part of modern Wuhan) in China, without having seen significant combat.

== List of Commanders ==
=== Commanding officer ===
	Name	From	To
1	General Yasuji Okamura	25 August 1944	22 November 1944
2	General Naozaburo Okabe	22 November 1944	15 August 1945

=== Chief of Staff ===
	Name	From	To
1	Major General Shuichi Miyazaki	25 August 1944	12 February 1945
2	Major General Yasuo Karakawa	12 February 1945	23 April 1945
3	Major General Sadatake Nakayama	23 April 1945	15 August 1945
