= Naozaburo Okabe =

Japanese officer (1887–1946)

- 岡部 直三郎
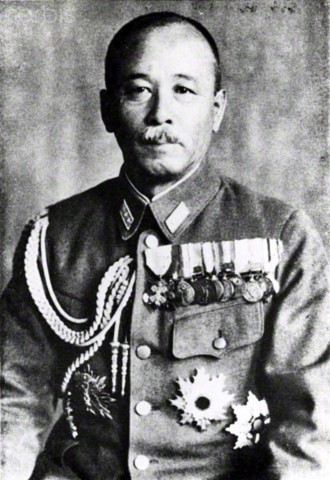
- Born: September 30, 1887; Hiroshima, Hiroshima Prefecture, Japan
- Died: November 23, 1946 (aged 59); Shanghai, China
- Military career
- Allegiance: Empire of Japan
- Branch: Imperial Japanese Army
- Service years: 1909-1945
- Rank: General
- Conflicts: Siberian Intervention; Second Sino-Japanese War; World War II

Naozaburō Okabe (岡部 直三郎, Okabe Naozaburō; September 30, 1887 – November 23, 1946) was a General in the Imperial Japanese Army, who commanded the Japanese Sixth Area Army from November 1944 until the end of World War II.

== Biography ==
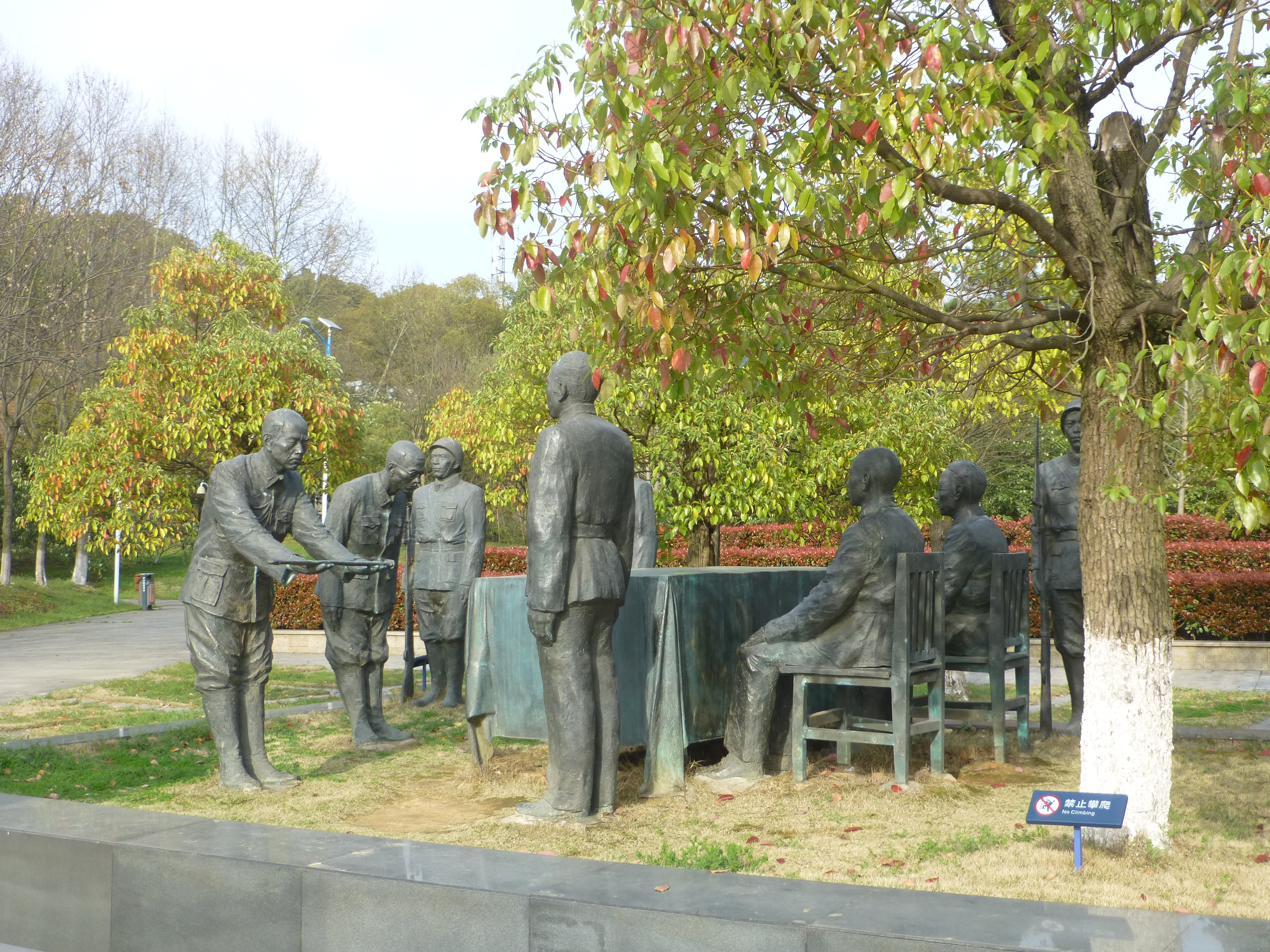
Surrender of the Japanese troops in Central China (1945-09-18), as depicted in one of the sections of the Victory Memorial at the SS Zhongshan tourist area in Wuhan. General Naozaburo Okabe (left) gives his sword to the Chinese General Sun Weiru

Okabe was born in Hiroshima city and attended military preparatory schools as a youth. He graduated from the 18th class of the Imperial Japanese Army Academy, where his classmates included Tomoyuki Yamashita and Korechika Anami. He subsequently graduated from the 27th class of the Army Staff College. In 1918, with the rank of captain, he was sent to the Vladivostok Special Operations Office during the Japanese intervention in Siberia, and as a major in 1922, he was sent as a military attache to Poland. During his time in Poland, he acquired the latest code encryption technology from one of his contacts in the Polish General Staff.

After his return to Japan, Okabe served as an instructor at the Staff College from December 1928 to April 1930, during which time he was promoted to colonel. In April 1934, he received command of the 1st Field Artillery Regiment. In February 1932, he was assigned to the staff of the Shanghai Expeditionary Army in the midst of the First Shanghai Incident, and he served in Shanghai until December of that year. After his return to Japan, he was assigned to research and training within the Staff College and was promoted to major general in August 1934. In August 1937, he was assigned as chief-of-staff of the newly-formed Northern China Area Army was responsible for direction and coordination of the Japanese military activity in all of north China, He was promoted to lieutenant general in December of the same year. In July 1938, Okabe was assigned command of the Manchukuo-based IJA 1st Division. which he led during the disastrous Nomonhan Incident. He was subsequently transferred to command the Mongolia Garrison Army in September 1939, where his forces suffered a defeat against the Chinese during the Battle of Wuyuan.

In September 1940, Okabe was recalled to Japan and attached to the Imperial Japanese Army General Staff. In 1940, he was awarded the Grand Cordon of the Order of the Rising Sun and the Order of the Golden Kite, 2nd class. From December, he was head of the Army Technical Headquarters and became a member of the Supreme War Council from October 1942. Simultaneously, he was also appointed as commandant of the Staff College. He was promoted to general in February 1943.

In October 1943, Okabe returned to the field as the commander of the newly-formed Japanese Third Area Army under the control of the Kwantung Army. This was a military reserve and garrison force to maintain security and public order in southern Manchukuo as many veteran divisions of the Kwantung Army were transferred to the various southern fronts in the Pacific War and was based in Mukden. In August 1944, he was transferred to command the Northern China Area Army based in Beijing, and in November of the same year, became commander of the newly-formed Japanese Sixth Area Army. This was also a reserve and garrison force for the occupation of the central provinces of China between the Yangtze River and the Yellow River. At the surrender of Japan, he surrendered his forces to the Republic of China Army at Hankou on September 2, 1945. Okabe was taken as a prisoner of war to Shanghai, where he was to be tried for unspecified war crimes, but he died in prison due to illness of November 28, 1946 before he could come to trial.
