= Waichirō Sonobe =

Imperial Japanese Army lieutenant general (1883–1964)

- 園部 和一郎
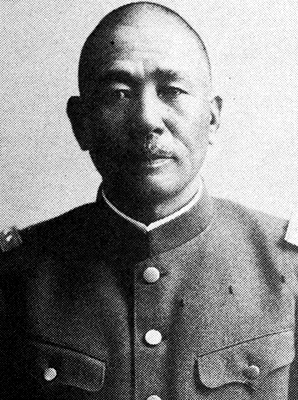
- Born: March 29, 1883; Kumamoto, Japan
- Died: August 18, 1964 (aged 81)
- Education: Imperial Japanese Army Academy; Army Staff College
- Military career
- Allegiance: Empire of Japan
- Branch: Imperial Japanese Army
- Service years: 1904–1941
- Rank: Lieutenant general
- Units: Imperial Japanese Army General Staff; Kwantung Army; Supreme War Council
- Commands: 7th Division; Central District Army; 11th Army
- Conflicts: Siberian intervention; Soviet–Japanese border conflicts; Second Sino-Japanese War
- Other work: Military attaché

Waichirō Sonobe (園部 和一郎, Sonobe Waichirō; 29 March 1883 – 18 March 1964) was a lieutenant general in the Imperial Japanese Army during the Second Sino-Japanese War.

== Biography ==
=== Early career ===
A native of Kumamoto Prefecture, his original surname was Mori, but he was adopted into the Sonobe family as a child. After attending military preparatory schools in Kumamoto and Tokyo, Sonobe graduated from the 16th class of the Imperial Japanese Army Academy in 1904. His classmates included Yasuji Okamura, Kenji Doihara, Rikichi Andō and Seishiro Itagaki. After serving as a junior officer with the IJA 23rd Infantry Regiment, he graduated from the 25th class of the Army Staff College and was assigned to the IJA 23rd Infantry Regiment.

From 1916 to 1917, he was sent as a military attaché to France. On his return to Japan, he was assigned to the IJA 30th Infantry Regiment and participated in the Siberian intervention from 1919 to 1920. On his return to Japan, he served in various staff positions within the Imperial Japanese Army General Staff Office and the Inspectorate General of Military Training.

From January 1925 to July 1927, Sonobe was the Army representative with the Japanese diplomatic mission to the League of Nations. After his return to Japan, he was assigned to command the IJA 74th Infantry Regiment within the IJA 19th Division until 1929. This division was based in northern Korea near the border with the Soviet Union.

From August 1929 to August 1933, Sonobe served as chief of 1st Section, Inspectorate General of Military Training. In August 1932, he was promoted to major general. In August 1933 he was again give a field command as commander of the IJA 8th Infantry Brigade of the IJA 10th Division, and was transferred in March 1934 to become commander of the IJA 1st Infantry Brigade of the IJA 1st Division.

From December 1934, Sonobe was deputy commandant of the Toyama Army Infantry School and then its commandant from December 1935 until August 1937. Concurrently from 1936 he commanded the 1st Independent Garrison Unit. He was promoted to lieutenant general in April 1936.

=== World War II ===
In August 1937, Sonobe was assigned command the IJA 7th Division. In February 1938, the division was permanently assigned to Kwantung Army, but arrived too late to participate in the Battle of Lake Khasan in July 1938. Parts of division were reinforcing IJA 23rd Division during the disastrous Battles of Khalkhin Gol in 1939. In August 1939, Sonobe was reassigned back to Japan and assigned to command the Central District Army, a reserve force with responsibility for defense of the Japanese home islands.

Sonobe was given another chance during the Second Sino-Japanese War, when we was assigned command of the Japanese Eleventh Army from March 1940. The IJA 11th Army was active at the Battle of Zaoyang-Yichang, Central Hupei Operation and Battle of South Henan. He returned to Japan in April 1941, and became a member of the Supreme War Council; however, he retired two months later in June 1941.

Sonobe was recalled to active service in March 1945 and attached to the Army Ordnance Administrative Headquarters. From April 1945, he was sent to Kurume, Fukuoka to oversee home guard defenses against a possible American invasion of Kyushu. After the surrender of Japan, he lived in relative obscurity to his death in 1964.
