= 59th Division (Imperial Japanese Army) =

- Active: 1942 - 1945
- Country: Empire of Japan
- Branch: Imperial Japanese Army
- Type: Infantry
- Size: 12080
- Garrison/HQ: Jinan
- Nickname: Robe Division
- Engagements: Second Sino-Japanese War; Battle of Central Henan

The 59th Division (第59師団, Dai-gojūkyū Shidan) was an infantry division of the Imperial Japanese Army. Its call sign was the Robe Division (衣兵団, Koromo Heidan). It was formed in Jinan on 2 February 1942 as a class C security division, alongside the 58th and 60th divisions. The division was formed around the 10th Independent Mixed Brigade. As a security division, the 59th Division was composed primarily of independent infantry battalions and had no artillery regiment. Its personnel were conscripted from Chiba Prefecture, and its replacement and reinforcement office was located in Kashiwa. The division was initially assigned to the 12th Army.

== Action ==
Upon its formation, the 59th Division assumed the security duties previously carried out by the 10th Independent Mixed Brigade. It first engaged Chinese guerrilla forces in Guantao County in June 1942. From August 1942, the division took part in operations against the forces of Yu Xuezhong. From mid-November 1942, it participated in an advance east of Jinan that isolated elements of the Chinese army on the Shandong Peninsula.

In December 1942, members of the 59th Division were involved in the Kantō Incident, a mutiny that occurred during their transfer to Guantao County. On 27 December 1942, conscripted members associated with the Yakuza went in search of alcohol, resulting in the breakdown of the transport company. The mutiny was suppressed two days later.

In January 1943, the 59th Division engaged the People's Liberation Army northeast of Jinan. Operations against Chinese forces in the Taihang Mountains began in April 1943. In July 1943, the 54th Infantry Brigade was sent to reinforce the 35th Division. Battles along the border of Shandong Province continued until mid-November 1943. However, the Chinese troops were unable to capture the city.

In January 1944, some of the divison's troops were sent to take part in the forthcoming Battle of Central Henan. The remainder of the divion continued security operations in Shandong Province, where heavier fighting broke out in November 1944.

In March 1945, a mortar company was added to the division. The 59th Division subsequently began withdrawing from Shandong Province , without a replacement force taking over its positions. During this period, Japanese forces extensively employed scorched earth tactics. Atrocities were also documented, including the use of coolies to clear minefields and the mass killing of civilians by the 45th Independent Infantry Battalion were recorded. On 30 May 1945, the 59th Division was attached to the Kwantung Army. On 18 June 1945, it was assigned to the 34th Army. Its remaining battalions arrived in Hamhung in early July 1945. Together with the 137th Division, they were still fortifying their positions when the Soviet invasion of Manchuria began on 9 August 1945. Japan eventually surrendered on 15 August 1945.

== See also ==
- List of Japanese Infantry Divisions

== Notes ==
- This article incorporates material from Japanese Wikipedia page 第59師団 (日本軍), accessed 12 June 2016

== Reference and further reading ==
- Madej, W. Victor. Japanese Armed Forces Order of Battle, 1937-1945 [2 vols]

Allentown, PA: 1981
