= Masaru Takiguchi =

Japanese-American Artist

- Born: 1941 (age 84–85); Osaka, Japan
- Education: Kyoto City University of Arts
- Occupations: artist, arts educator
- Known for: sculptures

Masaru "Taki" Takiguchi (born 1941 in Osaka, Japan) is a Japanese-born American artist and arts educator, based in Texas. He is best known for his sculpture, his work is often abstract and made of wood, stone or metal.

== Biography ==
Takiguchi received a B.A. degree in 1964 and M.A. degree in 1966 from Kyoto City University of Arts. In 1968, he immigrated to the United States and settled in Houston, Texas. He was invited to be a visiting artist at the University of Houston in 1969, 1970 and 1973.

Select exhibitions have included National Museum of Modern Art, Kyoto (1965), Longview Museum of Fine Art (1999), Galveston Arts Center (1995, 2006), Austin Museum of Art (2008) as well as others. Takiguchi outdoor sculpture is included in the following collections; Blaffer Art Museum with the works Orbit I and Orbit II, and Austin College with the work Quest.

He specialized in sculpting large abstract and semi-abstract pieces in stone; often using granite and other dense, heavy igneous rocks. He was a regular on the social scene in the Montrose–area of Houston and was very popular in the local artist community.
