= Fushun War Criminals Management Centre =

Prison in northeast China (1950–1975) and museum since 1986

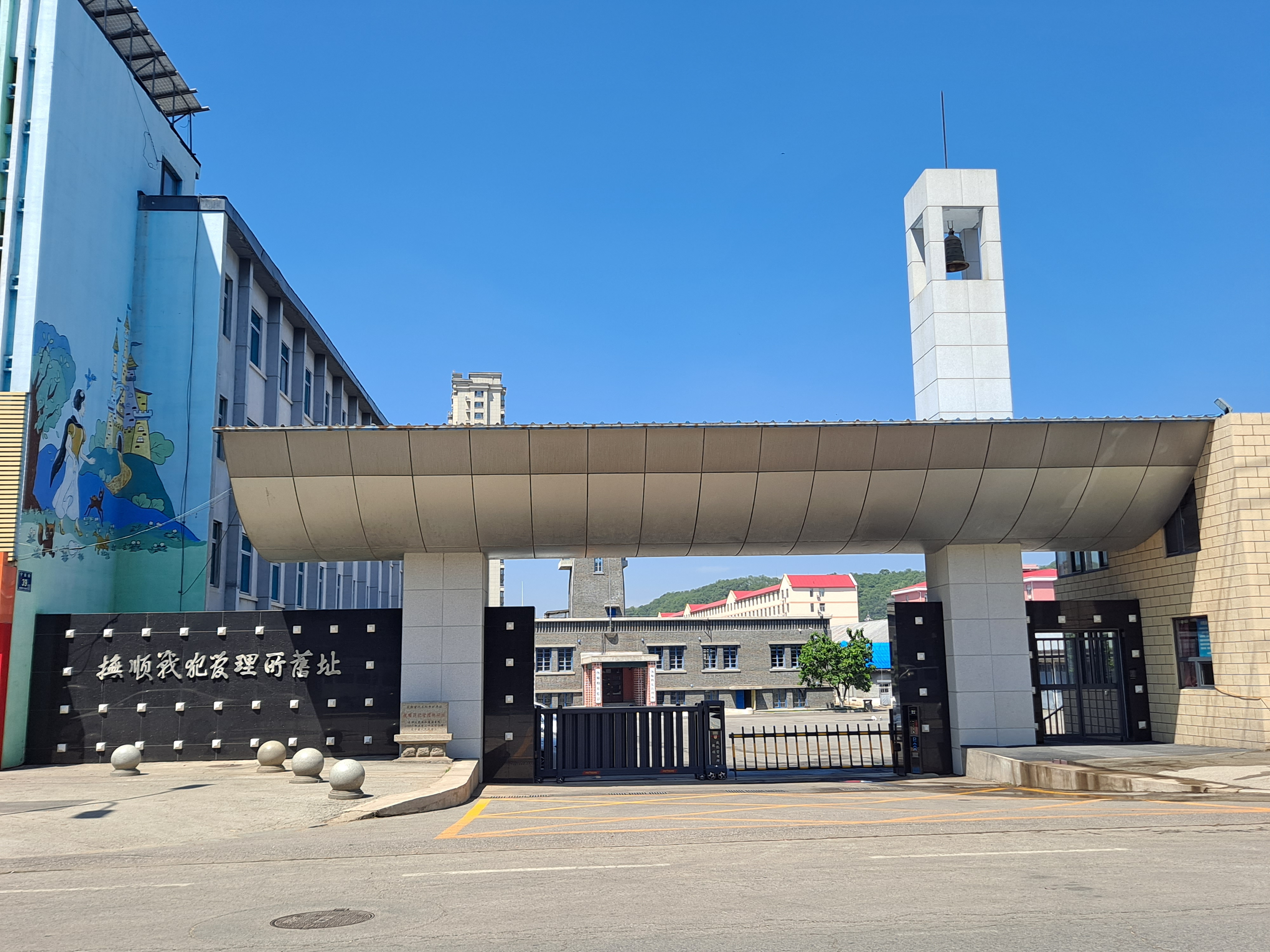
- Building entrance, 2025

- Location within Liaoning
- Location: Xinfu District, Fushun, Liaoning, China; 41°53′02″N 123°54′05″E
- Status: Operating
- Opened: 1936
- Closed: 1986
- Former name: Fushun Prison, Liaodong Provincial No. 3 Prison

Notable prisoners
- Puyi, Pujie, Xi Qia, Zang Shiyi, Zhang Jinghui, Sasaki Tōichi, Shigeru Fujita

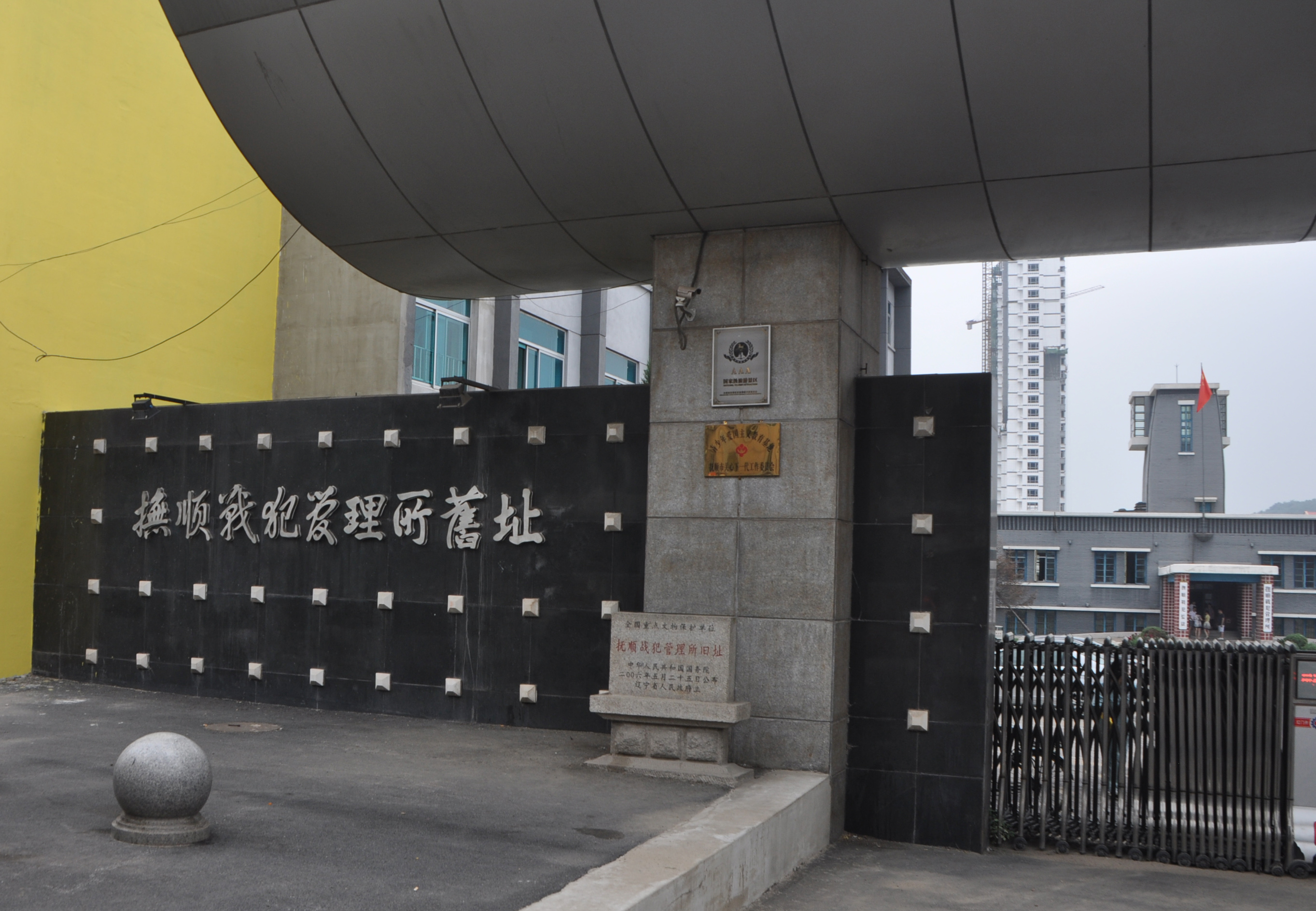
Main gate

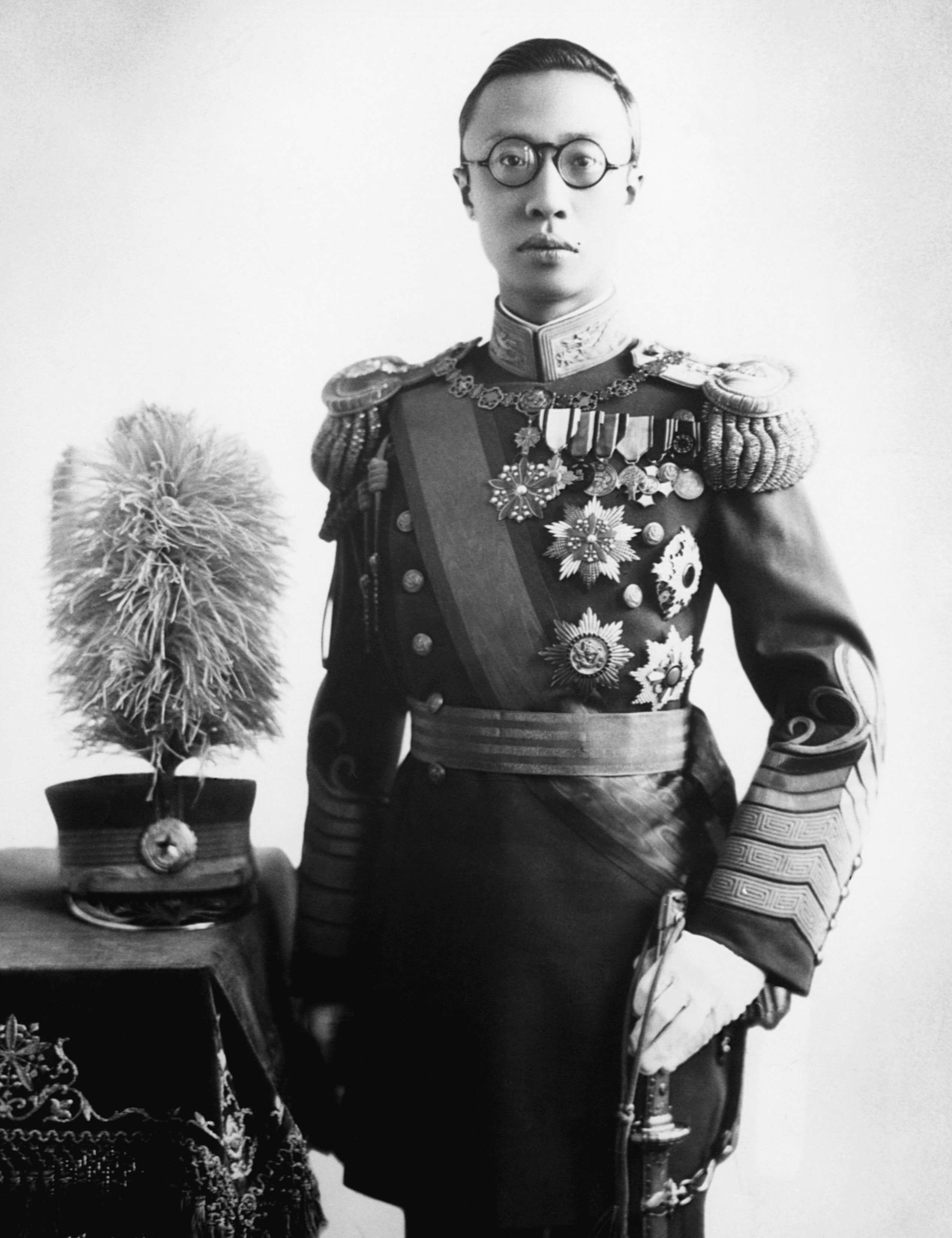
Notable inmate Puyi, Emperor of Manchukuo and, previously, last Emperor of China.

Fushun War Criminals Management Centre (traditional Chinese: 撫順戰犯管理所; simplified Chinese: 抚顺战犯管理所; pinyin: Fǔshùn Zhànfàn Guǎnlǐ Suǒ), also known as Liaodong No. 3 Prison or Liaoning No. 3 Prison, was the site of the re-education of Manchukuo, Kuomintang and Empire of Japan prisoners of war, held by China from 1950 onwards. It was located in the Xinfu District, Fushun, Liaoning.

Among the inmates were Puyi, the last emperor of China and former puppet emperor of Manchukuo, his younger brother Pujie and several other important World War II figures such as Xi Qia, Zang Shiyi and Zhang Jinghui. Part of the prison site currently remains in use, but the older section has been turned into a museum depicting the history of Fushun war criminals management centre and the life of the people who worked or were interned there.

== History ==
The Fushun Prison was originally constructed in 1936 by the occupying Japanese. At the end of World War II, the USSR had overrun the Japanese puppet state of Manchukuo and captured many of its government members and military personnel, both Chinese and Japanese. These prisoners were held near Khabarovsk (Boli) in the Russian Far East. During 1949 and early 1950, the Chinese sent delegations to the USSR headed by Mao Zedong in which they secured the extradition of these prisoners to China. Premier Zhou Enlai instructed the Northeast Judicial Department to make preparations for handling the war criminals. Liaodong Provincial No. 3 Prison, on the northern edge of Fushun city, was selected for conversion into the War Criminals Management Centre.

The first train carrying prisoners arrived in Fushun station at 15:00 on 21 July 1950. They were then transferred the short distance to the prison by bus. The prisoners comprised 969 Japanese detainees and 71 people who had been part of the Manchukuo puppet regime. The interns in Fushun War Criminals Management Centre were subject to intensive thought reform, which brought about some suicides. The US's Office of Strategic Services came to the centre to view the process.

After political rehabilitation, former counter-revolutionaries were sent back to Japan as an advance or vanguard party to foment a communist revolution in Japan. Some other Japanese prisoners were transferred from other locations such as Taiyuan War Criminals Management Centre, to bring the total number of Japanese prisoners to 982. The Japanese prisoners can be divided by occupation into 667 army personnel, 116 gendarmes, 155 special police and 44 administrative. Of these, 35 had the rank of general, 125 were field officers and 852 were junior officers or below. Alongside these prisoners from World War II were inmates from the Chinese Civil War that ended in 1949. These Kuomintang prisoners numbered 354.

In 1956, trials of the Japanese prisoners were held. Over the period 1956 to 1964, they were all released. Between 1959 and 1975, the Manchukuo and Kuomintang prisoners received special pardons and were released in stages. In total, over 1,300 prisoners passed through the centre.

In 1986, the Fushun War Criminals Management Centre was converted into a museum and opened to the public. It was depicted in several scenes of the 1987 Bernardo Bertolucci film The Last Emperor, which won nine Oscars. The centre was listed at Major Historical and Cultural Site Protected at the National Level in 2006.

== See also ==
- Masaru Uesaka
