= Eleventh Army (Japan) =

Japanese Eleventh Army
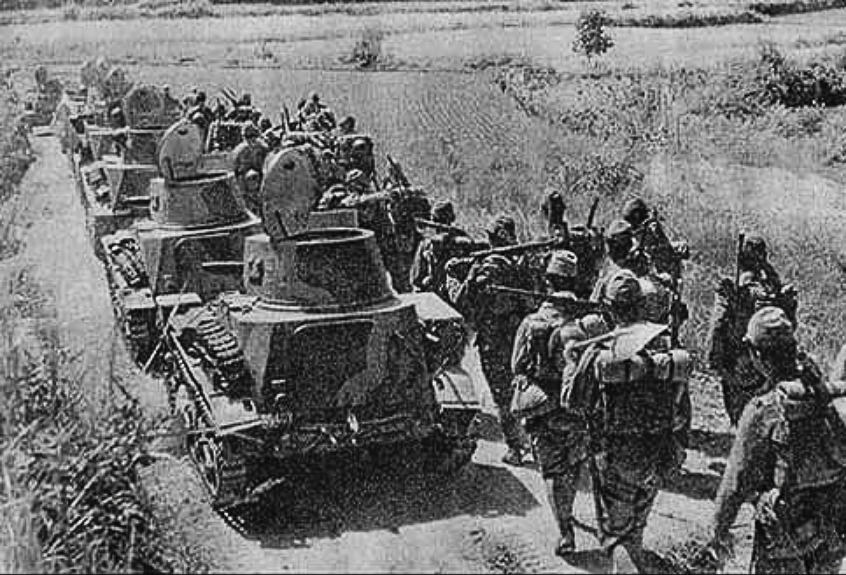
- Japanese troops enter Wuhan
- Active: July 4, 1938 – August 15, 1945
- Country: Empire of Japan
- Branch: Imperial Japanese Army
- Type: Infantry
- Role: Corps
- Garrison/HQ: Wuhan, Japanese-occupied China
- Nickname(s): Ro (呂, Backbone)
- Engagements: Battle of Wuhan

The Japanese 11th Army (第11軍, Dai-jyū-ichi gun) was an army of the Imperial Japanese Army during the Second Sino-Japanese War.

== History ==
The Japanese 11th Army was formed on July 4, 1938, under the Japanese Central China Area Army for the task of conquering and occupying the central provinces of China between the Yangtze River and the Yellow River. The 11th Army played a major role in the Battle of Wuhan. From September 1939, it came under the newly formed China Expeditionary Army and was transferred to the control of the Japanese Sixth Area Army in September 1944. It was disbanded at Quanzhou County (Guilin) in Guangxi province at the surrender of Japan.

== List of Commanders ==
=== Commanding Officers ===
	Name	From	To
1	Lieutenant General Yasuji Okamura	23 June 1938	9 March 1940
2	Lieutenant General Waichiro Sonobe	9 March 1940	4 April 1941
3	Lieutenant General Korechika Anami	4 April 1941	1 July 1942
4	Lieutenant General Osamu Tsukada	1 July 1942	22 December 1942
5	Lieutenant General Isamu Yokoyama	22 December 1942	22 November 1944
6	Lieutenant General Yoshio Kozuki	22 November 1944	7 April 1945
7	Lieutenant General Yukio Kasahara	7 April 1945	15 August 1945

=== Chief of Staff ===
	Name	From	To
1	General Teiichi Yoshimoto	20 June 1938	31 January 1939
2	Lieutenant General Takazo Numata	31 January 1939	1 August 1939
3	Lieutenant General Junsei Aoki	4 August 1939	1 March 1941
4	Major General Isamu Kinoshita	1 March 1941	1 December 1942
5	Major General Kunio Osonoe	1 December 1942	7 February 1944
6	Major General Sadatake Nakayama	7 February 1944	23 April 1945
7	Major General Banzo Fukutomi	23 April 1945	15 August 1945
