= Battle of Beiping–Tianjin order of battle =

Overview of the Order of Battle in Beiping-Tianjin

Below is the order of battle for the Battle of Beiping-Tianjin, called the Peiking-Tientsin Operation in pinyin spelling, a series of battles fought from 25 July through 31 July 1937 as part of the Second Sino-Japanese War. It was called the North China Incident (北支事変, Hokushi jihen) by the Japanese.

== Empire of Japan ==
Japanese ground force commanders

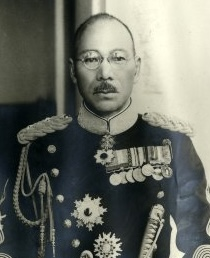
Lt. Gen. Tashiro Kanichiro

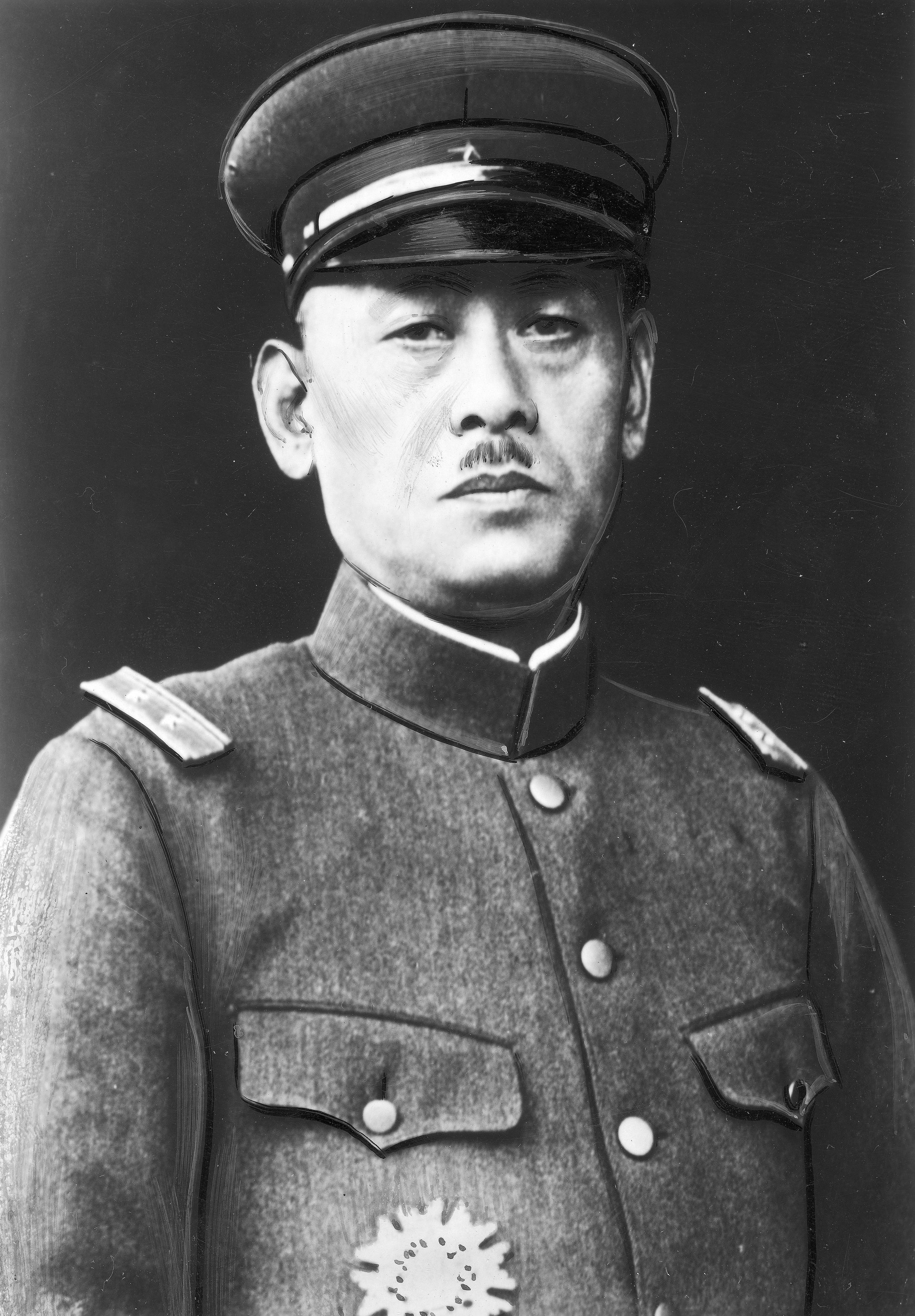
Lt. Gen. Katsuki Kiyoshi

=== Ground ===
Japanese China Garrison Army

Lieut. General Kanichiro Tashiro (1 May 1936 – 12 July 1937)
Lieut. General Kiyoshi Katsuki (12 July 1937 – 26 August 1937)

China Garrison Infantry "Kawabe" Brigade
Major General Masakazu Kawabe

1st China Garrison Infantry Regiment
2nd China Garrison Infantry Regiment

China Garrison Cavalry Unit
China Garrison Artillery Regiment
China Garrison Engineer Unit
China Garrison Armored Unit (17 tanks?)
China Garrison Signal Unit
China Garrison Army Hospital

5th Division
General Seishirō Itagaki

9th Infantry Brigade

11th Infantry Regiment
41st Infantry Regiment

21st Infantry Brigade

21st Infantry Regiment
42nd Infantry Regiment

5th Mountain Artillery Regiment
5th Cavalry Regiment
5th Engineer Regiment
5th Transport Regiment

20th Division
Lieutenant General Bunsaburo Kawakishi

39th Infantry Brigade

77th Infantry Regiment
78th Infantry Regiment

40th Infantry Brigade

79th Infantry Regiment
80th Infantry Regiment

26th Field Artillery Regiment
28th Cavalry Regiment
20th Engineer Regiment
20th Transport Regiment

1st Independent Mixed "Sakai" Brigade
Lieutenant General Sakai Koji

4th Tank Battalion

12 Type 89 Medium Tanks
13 Type 95 Light Tanks
12 Type 94 tankettes
4 Armored Engineer Vehicles

1st Independent Infantry Regiment
1st Independent Artillery Battalion
1st Independent Engineer Company

11th Independent Mixed "Suzuki" Brigade
Lieutenant General Shigiyasu Suzuki

11th Independent Infantry Regiment
12th Independent Infantry Regiment
11th Independent Cavalry Company
11th Independent Field Artillery Regiment
12th Independent Mountain Gun Regiment
11th Independent Engineer Company
11th Independent Transport Company

East Hebei Army

1st Corps (Tungchow) 4,000 men
2nd Corps (Tsunhua) 4,000 men
3rd Corps (Tungchow) 4,000 men
4th Corps (Tsunhua) 4,000 men
Training Corps (Tungchow) 2,000 men

Japanese air and naval commanders

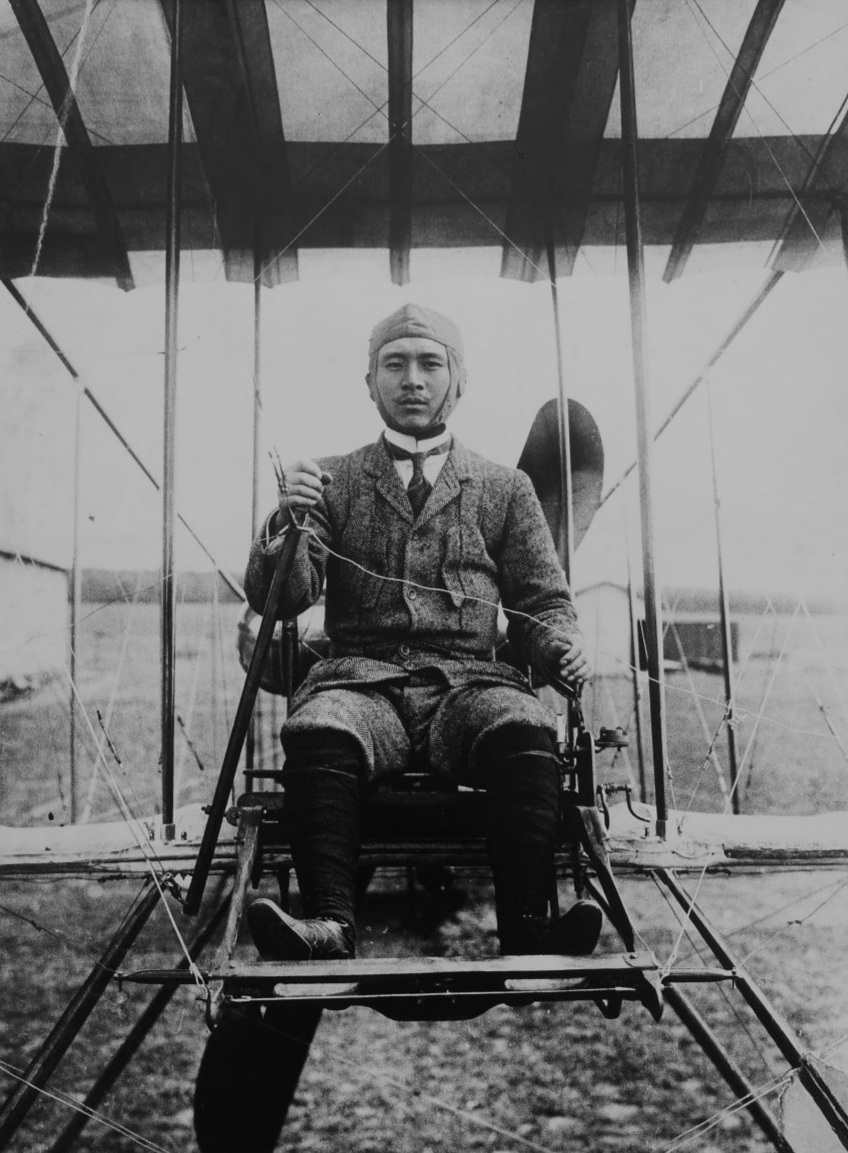
Gen. Yoshitoshi Tokugawa

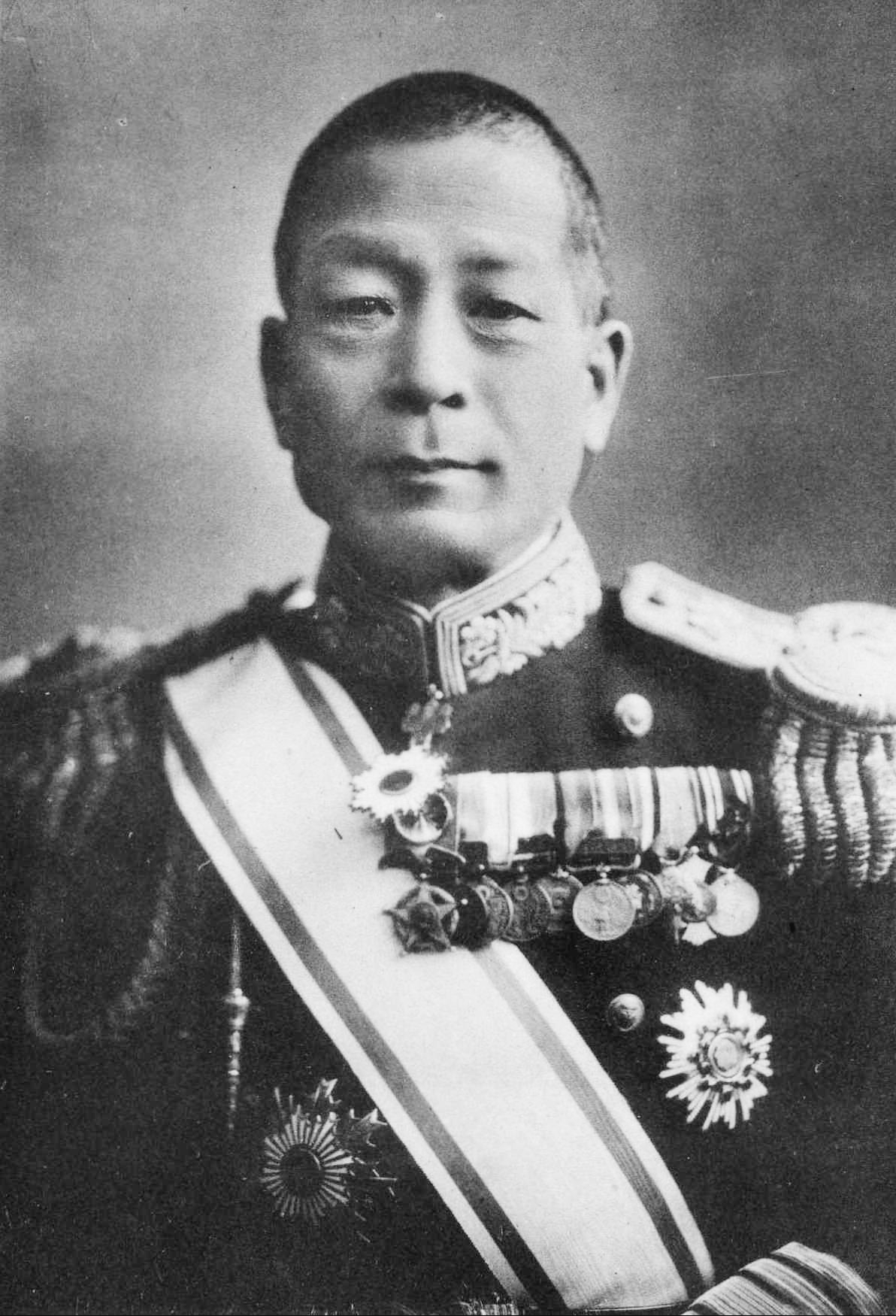
Adm. Yoshida Zengo

=== Air ===
Temporary China Area Aviation Division (Chugoku-Homen Rinji Hikoshidan)
General Yoshitoshi Tokugawa

1st Army Air Battalion (reconnaissance) Ki-3, Ki-4
2nd Army Air Battalion (fighter aircraft) Ki-10
3rd Army Air Battalion (long range reconnaissance)
5th Army Air Battalion (light bomber) Ki-2
6th Army Air Battalion (heavy bomber) Ki-2
8th Army Air Battalion (fighter) Ki-10
9th Army Air Battalion (heavy bomber) Ki-1
3rd Independent Air Company (heavy bomber)Ki-1
4th independent squadron (reconnaissance)
6th independent squadron (reconnaissance)
9th independent squadron (fighter) Ki-10
1st, 2nd Airfield companies
8th, 9th Signal platoons
1st Truck Transport company
3rd Field aircraft depot

=== Naval ===
2nd Fleet
Admiral Zengo Yoshida

== Republic of China ==
29th Army

Commander: Song Zheyuan

Deputy: Tong Linge

37th Division of Hopei (15,750 men)
Lt. Gen. Feng Chian

Special Operations Regiment
109th Brigade
110th Brigade
111th Brigade
Independent 35th Brigade

38th Division of Shansi (15,400 men)
General Zhang Zizhong

Special Operations Regiment
112th Brigade
113th Brigade
114th Brigade
Independent 26th Brigade

132nd Division of Shansi (15,000 men)
General Zhao Dengyu

Special Operations Regiment
1st Brigade
2nd Brigade
Independent 27th Brigade
Independent 28th Brigade

143rd Division of Hopei (in Chahar) (15,100 men)
General Liu Ruming

Special Operations Regiment
1st Brigade
2nd Brigade
Independent 29th Brigade
Independent 31st Brigade
Security Brigade

9th Cavalry Division of Northwest Army (3,000 men)

1st Brigade
2nd Brigade

Independent 13th Cavalry Brigade (1,500 men)
Hebei Peace Preservation Force (Peiwan, 2,500 men)
Independent 39th Brigade (3,500 men)
Independent 40th Brigade (3,400 men)

53rd Army
General Wan Fulin

== Sources ==
=== Print ===
- Hsu Long-hsuen and Chang Ming-kai (1971). History of The Sino-Japanese War (1937–1945). Translated by Wen Ha-hsiung (2nd ed.). 33, 140th Lane, Tung-hwa Street, Taipei, Taiwan Republic of China: Chung Wu Publishing. pp. 175–180, Map 2.
- Jowett, Phillip S. (2004). Rays of The Rising Sun, Armed Forces of Japan's Asian Allies 1931-45. Vol. I: China & Manchuria. 26 Willow Rd., Solihull, West Midlands, England: Helion & Co. Ltd.
- Liu Feng-han (1987). Collected Works on the History of the War of Resistance against Japan (劉鳳翰, <抗日戰史論集>).
- Madej, W. Victor (1981). Japanese Armed Forces Order of Battle, 1937-1945 (2 vols.). Allentown, Pennsylvania: Game Marketing Co. LCCN 82130553.

=== Web ===
- "Sino-Japanese Air War 1937-45". Håkans aviation page.
- "China Defense Forum: Organization of the 29th Army". chinadefense.com at the Internet Wayback Machine. Archived from the original on 2007-09-27.
- "抗日战争时期的侵华日军序列沿革 (Order of battle of the Japanese army that invaded China during the Sino Japanese War)". at the Internet Wayback Machine. Archived from the original on 2007-09-29.
- "Monograph 144 Chapter II". Shanghai Incident.
- "Taki's Imperial Japanese Army Page". Taki's Home Page.
