= Hayao Tada =

Imperial Japanese Army general (1882–1948)

- 多田 駿
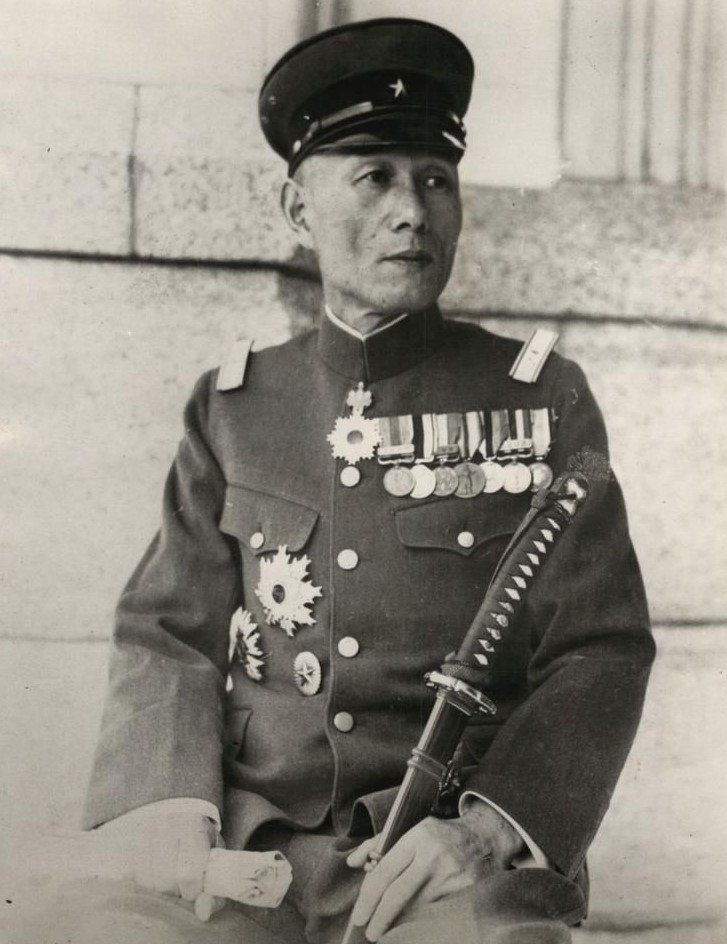
- Tada c. 1932
- Born: 24 February 1882; Sendai, Miyagi, Japan
- Died: 18 December 1948 (aged 66); Tateyama, Chiba, Japan
- Education: Imperial Japanese Army Academy; Army War College
- Family: Daisaku Kōmoto (father-in-law)
- Military career
- Allegiance: Empire of Japan
- Branch: Imperial Japanese Army
- Service years: 1903–1941
- Rank: General
- Units: 18th Artillery Regiment, Siberian Expeditionary Army, 16th Division, Kwantung Army, Imperial Japanese Army General Staff
- Commands: 4th Artillery Regiment, 4th Artillery Brigade, China Garrison Army, 11th Division, 3rd Army, North China Area Army
- Conflicts: Russo-Japanese War; Siege of Port Arthur; Siberian intervention; Second Sino-Japanese War; Winter Offensive (1939-1940); Hundred Regiments Offensive; Battle of South Shanxi
- Awards: Order of the Rising Sun; Order of the German Eagle, Grand Cross; Order of the Golden Kite, 2nd class
- Other work: Instructor, farmer

Hayao Tada (多田 駿, Tada Hayao; 24 February 1882 – 18 December 1948) was a general in the Imperial Japanese Army during the Second Sino-Japanese War. A noted China expert within the Japanese military, he was a leading figure in the Trautmann mediation effort to bring a negotiated end to the war.

== Biography ==
=== Early military career ===
Tada was the second son of a former samurai retainer of Sendai Domain from Sendai, and was adopted by his uncle. After attending military preparatory schools, he graduated from the 15th class of the Imperial Japanese Army Academy in 1903, specializing in the artillery, and as a junior officer, served with the IJA 18th Field Artillery Regiment at the Siege of Port Arthur during the Russo-Japanese War.

He graduated from the 25th class of the Army War College in 1913. That same year, he married a daughter of Daisaku Kōmoto, who was later famous for his involvement in the Huanggutun incident to assassinate Chinese warlord Zhang Zuolin. Tada served as an instructor to the Chinese National Revolutionary Army at the Beijing Military Academy from 1917 and rose to the position of senior military advisor to Chinese President Li Yuanhong. He became fluent in Mandarin Chinese and developed close personal contacts with many leading Chinese military and political figures of the time. Tada departed China on assignment to Vladivostok as part of the Siberian Expeditionary Army. From 1920 to 1923, he was an instructor at the Army Staff College, and visited the United States from July 1924 to May 1925. He returned to China from March 1926 to July 1927. In July 1927, he was promoted to colonel and resumed his post as an instructor at the Army Staff College. From March 1928, he was commander of the IJA 4th Field Artillery Regiment, and from May 1930 was chief of staff of the IJA 16th Division.

=== Second Sino-Japanese War ===
Tada returned to the Beijing Military Academy from March 1931, and was assigned to the Kwantung Army from April 1932, serving a senior military advisor to Manchukuo. He was promoted to major general in August. It has been alleged that Aisin Gioro Xianyu (Yoshiko Kawashima) was his mistress. In August 1934, he was made commander of the IJA 4th Field Artillery Brigade, and in August 1935 became commander in chief of the China Garrison Army. Tada was instrumental in establishing the East Hebei Autonomous Government later that year.

Tada was promoted to lieutenant general in April 1936 and assumed command of the IJA 11th Division in May 1936. With the outbreak of the Second Sino-Japanese War, he was recalled to Japan in August 1937 to become Vice Chief of the Imperial Japanese Army General Staff Office. He concurrently held the post of Commandant of the Army Staff College.

After the Marco Polo Bridge incident, Tada attempted to contact Kuomintang leader Chiang Kai-shek to defuse tensions between Japan and China in an effort at mediation sponsored by the German Ambassador to China, Oskar Trautmann. Tada argued that both countries faced the same external threat from the Soviet Union and internal threat from communism, and should not waste precious resources fighting one another; however, Tada's efforts were overruled by Prime Minister Fumimaro Konoe, Army Minister Hajime Sugiyama, Navy Minister Mitsumasa Yonai and Foreign Minister Kōki Hirota, all of whom berated Tada for attempting to effect private diplomacy.

Tada returned to China in December 1938 as commander of the IJA 3rd Army and in September 1939, he was promoted to commander of the North China Area Army. He was awarded the German Grand Cross of Order of the German Eagle in January 1940, and the Japanese Order of the Golden Kite, 2nd class in July 1941, and was promoted to full general. He retired from active military service two months later and moved to Tateyama, Chiba for the remainder of the war.

=== Post-war ===
After the surrender of Japan, Tada was placed under home arrest by the SCAP occupation authorities. He was charged with "Class A" war crimes, and was called as a witness for the prosecution against Iwane Matsui, Seishiro Itagaki, and Kenji Dohihara. Despite his position as a prosecution witness, he asserted the legitimacy of Japan's position in China.

On 18 December 1948, he died of stomach cancer at his home in Tateyama at the age of 66. It was revealed a week after his death that all charges against him had been dropped.

== Notes ==
Military offices
| Preceded by Yoshijirō Umezu | Commander, China Garrison Army; Aug 1935– May 1936 | Succeeded by Kanichiro Tashiro |
| Preceded by Kanichiro Tashiro | Commander of IJA 11th Division; May 1936-August 1937 | Succeeded by Sōbu Yamamuro |
| Preceded by Otozō Yamada | Commander of 3rd Army; December 1938-September 1939 | Succeeded by Kamezo Suetaka |
| Preceded by Hajime Sugiyama | Commander, North China Area Army; September 1941 – July 1941 | Succeeded by Yasuji Okamura |
