= Order of battle for campaign of northern and eastern Henan 1938 =

1938 military campaign

The following units and commanders fought in the Battle of Northern and Eastern Henan (January – June 1938).

== Japan ==
North China Area Army – Juichi Terauchi

- 1st Army – Kiyoshi Katsuki
  - 14th Division – Kenji Doihara
    - 27th Infantry Brigade
      - 2nd Infantry Regiment
      - 59th Infantry Regiment
    - 28th Infantry Brigade
      - 15th Infantry Regiment
      - 50th Infantry Regiment
    - 20th Field Artillery Regiment
    - 18th Cavalry Regiment
    - 14th Engineer Regiment
    - 14th Transport Regiment
  - 108th Division – Kumaya Shimomoto
    - 25th Infantry Brigade
      - 117th Infantry Regiment
      - 132nd Infantry Regiment
    - 104th Infantry Brigade
      - 52nd Infantry Regiment
      - 105th Infantry Regiment
    - 108th Field Artillery Regiment
    - 108th Cavalry Regiment
    - 108th Engineer Regiment
    - 108th Transport Regiment
  - 20th Division – ?
    - 39th Infantry Brigade
      - 77th Infantry Regiment
      - 78th Infantry Regiment
    - 40th Infantry Brigade
      - 79th Infantry Regiment
      - 80th Infantry Regiment
    - 26th Field Artillery Regiment
    - 28th Cavalry Regiment
    - 20th Engineer Regiment
    - 20th Transport Regiment
  - 109th Division – ?
    - 31st Infantry Brigade
      - 69th Infantry Regiment
      - 107th Infantry Regiment
    - 118th Infantry Brigade
      - 119th Infantry Regiment
      - 136th Infantry Regiment
    - 109th Mountain Artillery Regt
    - 109th Cavalry Regiment
    - 109th Engineer Regiment
    - 109th Transport Regiment
  - Forces directly under 1st Army: **
    - 4th Independent Machinegun Battalion
    - 5th Independent Machinegun Battalion
    - 9th Independent Machinegun Battalion
    - 1st Independent Light Armored Car Squadron
    - 5th Independent Light Armored Car Squadron
    - 2nd Tank Battalion
    - 1st Independent Mountain Artillery Regiment
    - 3rd Independent Mountain Artillery Regiment
    - 2nd Field operation Heavy Artillery Regiment
    - 5th Field operation Heavy Artillery Regiment
    - 6th Field operation Heavy Artillery Regiment
    - 8th Independent Field Heavy Artillery Regiment
    - 3rd Artillery Battalion
    - 5th Artillery Battalion
- 2nd Army – Toshizō Nishio, Field Marshal Prince Naruhiko Higashikuni (from 30 Apr 1938)
  - 16th Division – Kesou Nakashima
    - 9th Infantry Brigade
      - 9th Infantry Regiment
      - 20th Infantry Regiment
    - 30th Infantry Brigade
      - 33rd Infantry Regiment
      - 38th Infantry Regiment
    - 22nd Field Artillery Regiment
    - 16th Engineer Regiment
    - 16th Transport Regiment
  - 5th Division
  - 10th Division
- Directly under North China Front Army:
  - 114th Division – ? (from Central China Front Army)
    - 127th Infantry Brigade
      - 66th Infantry Regiment
      - 115th Infantry Regiment
    - 128th Infantry Brigade
      - 102nd Infantry Regiment
      - 150th Infantry Regiment
    - 120th Field Artillery Regt
    - 118th Cavalry Regiment
    - 114th Engineer Regiment
    - 114th Transport Regiment
  - China Mixed Brigade – ?
    - 1st China Stationed Infantry Regiment – Colonel Hasegawa
    - 2nd China Stationed Infantry Regiment – Colonel ?
    - China Garrison Cavalry Unit
    - China Garrison Artillery Regiment – Colonel ?
    - China Stationed Engineer Unit
    - China Stationed Signal Unit – ?
  - 3rd Independent Mixed Brigade – ?
    - 6th Independent Infantry Battalion
    - 7th Independent Infantry Battalion
    - 8th Independent Infantry Battalion
    - 9th Independent Infantry Battalion
    - 10th Independent Infantry Battalion
    - Independent Artillery Troops
    - Independent labor troops
    - Signal Communication unit.
  - 4th Independent Mixed Brigade – ?
    - 11th Independent infantry Battalion
    - 12th Independent infantry Battalion
    - 13th Independent infantry Battalion
    - 14th Independent infantry Battalion
    - 15th Independent infantry Battalion
    - Independent Artillery Troops
    - Independent labor troops
  - 5th Independent Mixed Brigade – ?
    - 16th Independent Infantry Battalion
    - 17th Independent Infantry Battalion
    - 18th Independent Infantry Battalion
    - 19th Independent Infantry Battalion
    - 20th Independent Infantry Battalion
    - Independent artillery troops
    - Independent labor troops

== China ==
China (Feb. 1938)

1st War Area – Cheng Qian

- Eastern Honan Army – Hsueh Yueh
  - 64th Army – Li Han-huen
    - 155th Division – Chen Kung-hsin
    - 187th Division – Peng Ling-cheng
  - 74th Army – Wang Yaowu
    - 51st Division – Wang Yaowu
    - 58th Division – Po Hui-chang
  - 8th Army – Huang Chieh
    - 40th Division – Lo Li-jung
    - 102nd Division – Po Hui-chang
  - 27th Army – Kuei Yung-ching
    - 36th Division [g] – Chiang Fu-sheng
    - 46th Division – Li Liang-yung
- 3rd Group Army – Sun Tongxuan
  - 12th Army – Sun Tongxuan
    - 20th Division – Chang Tse-ming
    - 22nd Division – Ku Liang-min
    - 81st Division – Chan Shu-tang
  - 55th Army – Tsao Fu-lin
    - 29th Division – Tsao Fu-lin
    - 74th Division – Li Han-chang
- 20th Group Army – Shang Chen
  - 32nd Army – Shang Chen
    - 139th Division – Li Chao-ying
    - 141st Division – Sung Ken-tang
    - 142nd Division – Lu Chi
    - Salt Gabelle Brigade – Chian Chi-ke
    - 23rd Division – Li Pi-fan
- 71st Army – Sung Hsi-lien
  - 87th Division [g] – Shen Fa-tsao
  - 88th Division [g] – Fung Mu-han
- 39th Army – Liu Ho-ting
  - 34th Division – Kung Ping-fan
  - 56th Division – Liu Shang-chih
- 1st Group Army – Song Zheyuan
  - 77th Army – Feng Chih-an
    - 37th Division – Chang Ling-yun
    - 132nd Division – Wang Chang-hai
    - 179th Division – Ho Chi-feng
  - 69th Army – Shih Yu-san
    - 181st Division – Shih Yu-san
    - New 9th Division – Kao Shu-hsun
  - 53rd Army – Wan Fu-lin
    - 116th Division – Chao Fu-cheng
    - 130th Division – Chu Hung-hsun
- 91st Army – Kao Tse-chu
  - 166th Division – Ma Li-wu
  - 45th Division – Liu Chin
- 90th Army – Peng Chin-chih
  - 195th Division – Liang Kai
  - 196th Division – Liu Chao-huan
- New 8th Division – Chiang Tsai-chen
- 95th Division – Lo Chi
- 91st Division – Feng Chan-tsai
- New 35th Division – Wang Ching-tsai
- 61st Division – Chung Sung
- 106th Division – Shen Ke
- 109th Division – Li Shu-sen
- 94th Division – Chu Huai-ping
- 24th Division – Lin Ying
- 9th Reserve Division – Chang Yen-chuan
- 8th Reserve Division – Ling Chao-yao
- 28th Separate Brigade – Wu Hua-wen
- Hopei Militia – Chang Yin-wu
- Hopei Chahar Guerrilla Commander – Sun Tien-ying
- 3rd Cavalry Army – Cheng Ta-chang
  - 4th Cavalry Division – Chang The-shun
  - 9th Cavalry Division – Wang Chi-feng
- 14th Separate Cavalry Brigade – Chang Chan-kuei
- 2nd Brigade, New 1st Cavalry Division – Ma Lu
- 13th Cavalry Brigade – Yao Ching-chuan
- 6th Artillery Brigade – Huang Yung-an
- 10th Separate Artillery Brigade – Peng Meng-chi
- 5th Regiment, 1st Arty Brigade – Li Kang-yen
- 7th Separate Artillery Regiment – Chang Kuang-hou
- 9th Separate Artillery Regiment – Kuang Yu-ai

Airforce

- 3rd ARC had its headquarters at Sian and supported the 1st and 2nd War Zones in Honan and Hupei. During March was the 7th Pursuit Squadron of the 3rd Pursuit Group was re-equipped with Polikarpov I-15bis fighters at Xiang Yung. At the same time the 8th Pursuit Squadron from the same group re-equipped with I-15bis at Sian. In Ziaogan, for the support of the ground forces in the battle for Taierzhuang and Zaozhuang (Hubei Province), the 7th and 8th PS was ordered to conclude the re-training on the I-15bis. In March the 17th and 25th PS with the I-15bis were concentrated to Sian (Shensi Province).

Notes

- [g] German trained Divisions:

3rd, 6th, 9th, 14th, 36th, 87th, 88th, and the Training Division of the Central Military Academy. Also the "Tax Police" regiment (equivalent of a division) under T.V. Soong's Ministry of Finance, later converted to the New 38th Division during the war.

- [r]12 other Divisions on the reorganized model with 2 German advisors:

2nd, 4th, 10th, 11th, 25th, 27th, 57th, 67th, 80th, 83rd, 89th Division

== Sources ==
- Hsu Long-hsuen and Chang Ming-kai, History of The Sino-Japanese War (1937–1945) 2nd Ed.,1971. Translated by Wen Ha-hsiung, Chung Wu Publishing, pp. 230–235. Map 9-2
- Sino-Japanese Air War 1937–45: 1938
- History of the Frontal War Zone in the Sino-Japanese War, published by Nanjing University Press.
- Madej, W. Victor, Japanese Armed Forces Order of Battle, 1937–1945 [2 vols], Allentown, Pennsylvania: 1981.
