= Battle of Lanfeng =

1938 battle of the Second Sino-Japanese War

- Part of the Battle of Northern and Eastern Henan in the Second Sino-Japanese War and the interwar period
Date	May 20 – June 10, 1938 (3 weeks)
Location	Kaifeng and Shangqiu counties in Henan province, Republic of China
Result	Japanese victory
Territorial changes	Japanese capture of Lanfeng and Kaifeng; Destruction of the embankments in Huayuankou Town by Chinese forces to block the Japanese advance, resulting in the 1938 Yellow River flood

Belligerents
(Taiwan) China	Japan

Commanders and leaders
(Republic of China (1912–1949)) Chiang Kai-shek (commander-in-chief) (Republic of China (1912–1949)) Cheng Qian (Republic of China (1912–1949)) Xue Yue (Republic of China (1912–1949)) Gui Yongqing	(Empire of Japan) Kenji Doihara

Units involved
Battle of Lanfeng : fourteen divisions Battles of Kaifeng and Zhongmu : two divisions and one tax police brigade	14th Division

Strength
Japanese claim : In the battles of Lanfeng, Sanyi, and Kaifeng (May 22 to June 6, 1938) : approximately 200,000; In the battle of Zhongmu (June 6 to June 7, 1938) : approximately 7,000	20,000: Chinese claim for the encirclement : around 7,000

Casualties and losses
Chinese claims : Battle of Lanfeng : 46th Division : 2 brigade commanders, 11 school officers, 108 junior officers, and more than 4,000 soldiers casualties.; 87th and 88th Divisions of the 71st Corps : more than 7,000 killed or wounded, more than 1,100 missing.; 51st and 58th Divisions of the 74th Corps : heavy casualties, with a total of 7,000 new recruits requested by the corps commander to cover the losses.; 1st, 61st, 78th, and 36th Divisions : 7,125 casualties.; 20th Division : very heavy casualties.; 106th and 155th Divisions : very heavy casualties.; 195th Division : very heavy losses, with only approximately 5,200 troops and labourers and 500 rifles left. 3,000 supplementary troops were requested by the divisional commander.; 200th Division : light losses.; 14th Cavalry Brigade : 115 casualties.; 34th Division : unknown; Battles of Kaifeng and Zhongmu : 141st Division and Tax Police Brigade of the 32nd Corps in the battle of Kaifeng : more than 2,050 casualties.; 142nd Division in the battle of Zhongmu : more than 300 casualties.; Japanese claim : In the battles of Lanfeng, Sanyi, and Kaifeng : approximately 21,500 killed, 9,125 captured.; In the battle of Zhongmu : approximately 130 killed, 24 captured.	Japanese claim : In the battles of Lanfeng, Sanyi, and Kaifeng : 452 killed, 1,543 wounded.; In the battle of Zhongmu : 4 killed, 1 wounded.

The Battle of Lanfeng (Chinese: 蘭封會戰), in the Second Sino-Japanese War, was part of the larger campaign for Northern and Eastern Henan (February 7 – June 10, 1938) and took place at the same time as the Battle of Xuzhou (Late December – Early June 1938) was occurring.

It involved a Chinese counterattack at Lanfeng by elements of the 1st War Area against the positions held by the Japanese 14th Division. The 14th Division was the vanguard of the Japanese First Army (North China Area Army) and numbered 20,000 men with tanks. It was the first action of the Chinese 200th Division, the first mechanized division in the Chinese Army.

In the assault, the 200th Division of the National Revolutionary Army, located to the west of the line of contact, overran the flanks of Kenji Doihara's 14th Division, successfully encircling 7,000 men of the division in the county of Lanfeng. The battle resulted in a Japanese defeat, forestalling the Japanese capture of the northern section of the Longhai railway. The Chinese victory, which The New York Times described as a second Taierzhuang, resulted in the near destruction of the 14th Division.

Simultaneously, Japanese forces undertook a successful offensive operation that captured the city of Kweiteh southeast of Lanfeng.

== Order of Battle of Lanfeng ==
See the Order of Battle of the Battle of Lanfeng

== Sources ==
Hsu Long-hsuen and Chang Ming-kai, History of The Sino-Japanese War (1937–1945) 2nd Ed., 1971. Translated by Wen Ha-hsiung, Chung Wu Publishing; 33, 140th Lane, Tung-hwa Street, Taipei, Taiwan Republic of China, page 230–235, Map. 9-2
