= Yoshijirō Umezu =

Japanese officer, war criminal (1882–1949)

- 梅津 美治郎
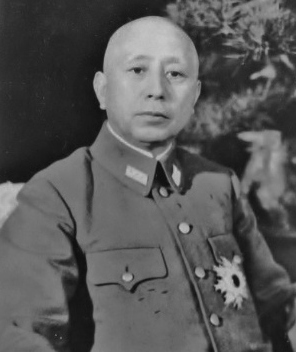

Chief of the Imperial Japanese Army General Staff
- In office July 18, 1944 – September 1945
- Monarch: Hirohito
- Preceded by: Hideki Tojo
- Succeeded by: Position abolished

17th Governor-General of the Kwantung Leased Territory
- In office September 7, 1939 – July 18, 1944
- Monarch: Hirohito
- Preceded by: Kenkichi Ueda
- Succeeded by: Otozō Yamada
Additional positions
Japanese Ambassador to Manchukuo
In office September 7, 1939 – July 18, 1944
Monarch	Hirohito
Prime Minister	Nobuyuki Abe; Mitsumasa Yonai; Fumimaro Konoe; Hideki Tojo
Preceded by	Kenkichi Ueda
Succeeded by	Otozō Yamada
Member of the Supreme War Council
In office October 15, 1945 – November 30, 1945
Monarch	Hirohito

Personal details
- Born: January 4, 1882 Nakatsu, Ōita, Japan
- Died: January 8, 1949 (aged 67) Sugamo Prison, Tokyo, Japan

Military service
- Allegiance: Empire of Japan
- Branch/service: Imperial Japanese Army
- Years of service: 1903–1945
- Rank: General
- Commands: Japanese China Garrison Army, IJA 2nd Division, Japanese First Army, Kwantung Army, Imperial Japanese Army General Staff
- Battles/wars: Russo-Japanese War; Pacification of Manchukuo; Second Sino-Japanese War; World War II

Yoshijirō Umezu (梅津 美治郎, Umezu Yoshijirō; January 4, 1882 – January 8, 1949) was a Japanese general and Chief of the Army General Staff during the final years of World War II. He was convicted of war crimes and sentenced to life imprisonment.

== Biography ==
=== Early life and career ===
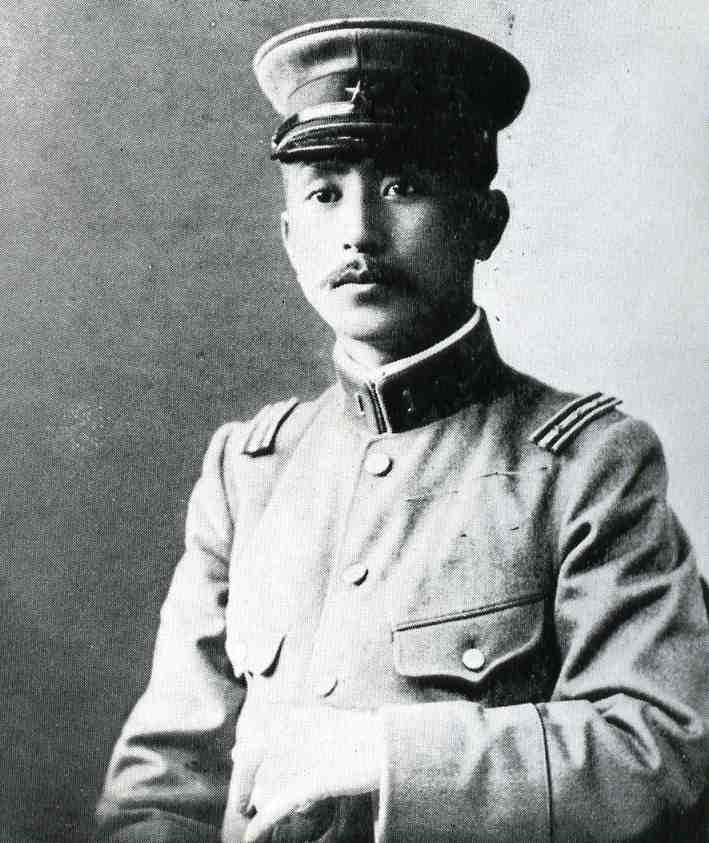
Umezu in 1912

Umezu was born in Nakatsu, Ōita, Japan, where his family ran a bookstore since the 18th century. During his years at the Kumamoto Prefectural Seiseikou High School in Kumamoto, he decided to pursue a military career. He graduated from the 15th class of the Imperial Japanese Army Academy on November 30, 1903, and was commissioned a second lieutenant in the infantry the following February 12, 1904. Promoted to lieutenant on June 30, 1905, he entered the 23rd class of the Army Staff College, graduating first in 1911. Following his promotion to captain on March 25, 1912, he was sent to Europe for further studies in Germany and Denmark. While in Denmark, he was also a military observer from Japan, during the course of World War I, and was promoted to major on June 1, 1918. From 1919 to 1921, he was appointed as a military attaché to Switzerland.

Umezu was promoted to lieutenant colonel on February 8, 1922, and to colonel on December 15, 1925. Umezu served as an instructor at the Army Staff College from 1923 to 1924, and was commander of the IJA 3rd Infantry Regiment from 1924 to 1926.

Umezu was promoted to major general in August 1930 and commander of the IJA 1st Infantry Brigade. He worked at the General Staff from August 1933, and was sent as a military attaché to Switzerland from November 1933. After his return to Japan in March 1934, he was appointed commander of the Japanese China Garrison Army and in November repelled a large-scale Chinese incursion into Rehe Province. In June 1935 he signed the He–Umezu Agreement, which was an attempt to defuse tensions between the Republic of China and Japan, and which gave Japan control over ten provinces of Hebei. Umezu was promoted to lieutenant general in August. In August 1935, he became commander of the Sendai-based IJA 2nd Division. He strongly opposed the February 26 incident attempted coup-de-etat in 1936. Umezu was appointed Vice Minister of the Army from March 1936 and working under Army Minister Hisaichi Terauchi, purged many of the radical kōdōha members from the Army ranks.

=== World War II ===
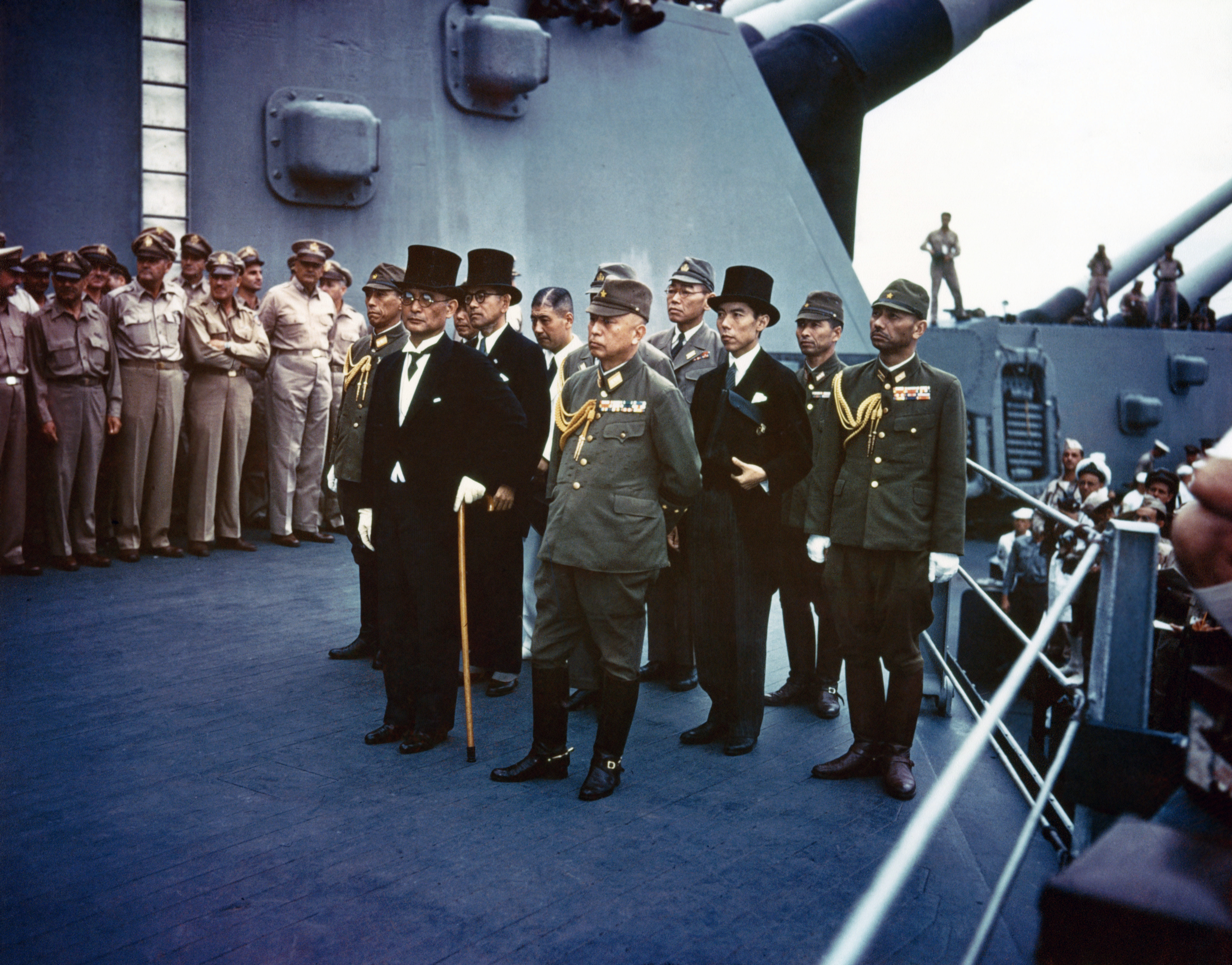
The surrender of Japan on the USS Missouri. Standing in the front row are Japanese Foreign Minister Mamoru Shigemitsu (left) and Umezu (right).

Umezu returned to China in May 1938 as commander-in-chief of the IJA 1st Army. By this time, the IJA 1st Army had completed its combat operations, and was serving as a garrison force in Japanese-occupied Northern China. From September 1939 he was commander-in-chief of the Kwantung Army, which was likewise acting as a garrison force in Manchukuo. He was promoted to full general on August 1, 1940.

In July 1944, Umezu was appointed as the final Chief of the Imperial Japanese Army General Staff, and a member of the Supreme War Council, following the resignation of Hideki Tojo. Along with Army Minister Korechika Anami and the Chief of Imperial Japanese Navy General Staff, Soemu Toyoda, Umezu opposed surrender in August 1945 and believed that the military should fight on and that by forcing the Allies to sustain heavy losses in an invasion, Japan could negotiate for peace under better terms. He was aware of the planned coup d'état by junior officers opposed to the surrender but did nothing to aid or to hinder it. He was personally ordered by Emperor Hirohito to sign the instrument of surrender on behalf of the armed forces on September 2, 1945, and was thus the Army's senior representative during the surrender ceremonies on the battleship USS Missouri, officially ending World War II. He entered the reserves on November 30.

After the war, he was arrested by the SCAP authorities and tried as a war criminal at the International Military Tribunal for the Far East in Tokyo. He was found guilty of Counts 1, 27, 29, 31 and 32 of waging a war of aggression and sentenced to life imprisonment on November 12, 1948.

Umezu died from rectal cancer in 1949 while he was still incarcerated. He converted to Catholicism one day before his death, and his last rites were performed at his bedside by a Catholic priest. Although Umezu had followed the militaristic State Shinto religion, his family favored Catholicism, and his daughter became a Catholic nun.

Umezu signing the instrument of surrender to the Allied nations

== Decorations ==
- 1906 – Order of the Rising Sun, 6th class
- 1906 – Order of the Golden Kite, 5th class
- 1913 – Order of the Sacred Treasure, 5th class
- 1915 – Order of the Rising Sun, 4th class
- 1922 – Order of the Sacred Treasure, 3rd class
- 1933 – Order of the Sacred Treasure, 2nd class
- 1936 – Grand Cordon of the Order of the Sacred Treasure
- 1939 – Grand Cordon of the Order of the Rising Sun
- 1940 – Order of the Golden Kite, 2nd class

== Notes ==
Government offices
Preceded by Kenkichi Ueda	Governor of the Kwantung Leased Territory; 1939–1944	Succeeded by Otozō Yamada
Military offices
Preceded by Kotaro Nakamura	Commander, China Garrison Army; Mar 1934 – Aug 1935	Succeeded by Hayao Tada
Preceded by Kiyoshi Katsuki	Commander, IJA 1st Army; May 1938 – Sept 1939	Succeeded by Yoshio Shinozuka
Preceded by Kenkichi Ueda	Commander, Kwantung Army; Sept 1939 – Jul 1944	Succeeded by Otozō Yamada
Preceded by Hideki Tōjō	Chief of Imperial Japanese Army General Staff; Jul 1944 – Sept 1945	Succeeded by none
