= Japanese China Garrison Army =

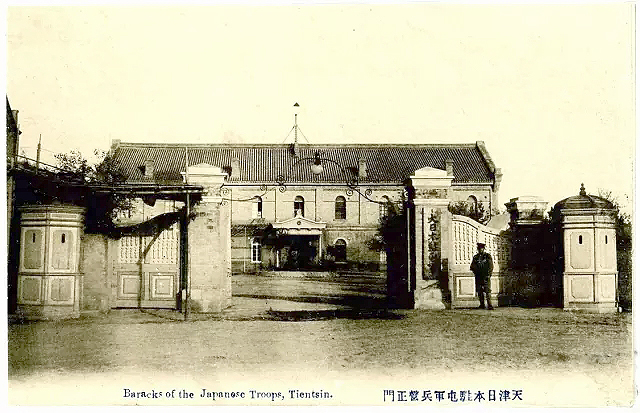
- Barracks of the China Garrison Army, approx. 1905
- Active: 1 June 1901 – 26 August 1937
- Country: Empire of Japan
- Branch: Imperial Japanese Army
- Type: Infantry
- Role: Field Army
- Garrison/HQ: Tianjin, China

The China Garrison Army (支那駐屯軍, Shina Chutongun) was formed 1 June 1901 as the Chinese Empire Garrison Army (清国駐屯軍, Shinkoku Chutongun), as part of Japan's contribution to the international coalition in China during the Boxer Rebellion. It took the name China Garrison Army from 14 April 1912 and onward, though was typically referred to as the Tianjin Garrison.

== History ==
The IJA 5th Division was dispatched to protect Japanese nationals and property in Tianjin, China in June 1900 after the start of the Boxer Rebellion. It formed the core of the Japanese expeditionary forces in northern China. Under the terms of the Boxer Protocol, Japan was allowed to maintain a military garrison to guard its embassy, concessions in China, as well as certain strategic fortifications and ports. The IJA 5th Division was thus transformed into the Chinese Empire Garrison Army in June 1901.

After the Xinhai Revolution overthrew the Qing dynasty and the Republic of China was proclaimed in 1911, the name was considered an anachronism, and the Chinese Empire Garrison Army was thus renamed in 1912 to the China Garrison Army.

From April 1936, as diplomatic relations between Japan and China continued to worsen, the China Garrison Army was reinforced with ten companies of infantry and one combined regiment.

Its forces were involved in the clash with the Chinese in the Marco Polo Bridge Incident that triggered the Second Sino-Japanese War. The China Garrison Army was reinforced in July 1937 with the IJA 20th Division from Korea and two Independent combined brigades from the Kwantung Army in Manchukuo, and subsequently with an additional three infantry divisions (the IJA 5th Division, IJA 6th Division and IJA 10th Division) from the Japanese home islands for the Battle of Beiping-Tianjin and Operation Chahar.

The China Garrison Army was abolished on 26 August 1937 and its forces redistributed between the Japanese First Army, Japanese Second Army and Japanese Northern China Area Army. Garrison duties for the Tianjin area were assigned to the IJA 27th Division.

== List of Commanders ==
=== Commanding officer ===
	Name	From	To
1	Lieutenant General Hisanao Oshima	1 June 1901	4 July 1901
2	Lieutenant General Takesuke Yamane	4 July 1901	25 October 1901
3	General Yoshifuru Akiyama	25 October 1901	2 April 1903
4	Lieutenant General Taro Senba	2 April 1903	25 June 1905
5	General Mitsumoi Kamio	25 June 1905	27 November 1906
6	Lieutenant General Aizo Nakamura	27 November 1906	21 November 1908
7	Lieutenant General Teijiro Abe	21 November 1908	24 April 1912
8	Lieutenant General Kojiro Sato	24 April 1912	8 August 1914
9	General Takeshi Nara	8 August 1914	5 July 1915
10	Lieutenant General Sueharu Saito	5 July 1915	2 May 1916
11	Lieutenant General Masaomi Ishimitsu	2 May 1916	10 June 1918
12	General Hanzo Kanaya	10 June 1918	25 July 1919
13	Major General Jirō Minami	25 July 1919	20 January 1921
14	Lieutenant General Ichiba Suzuki	20 January 1921	6 August 1923
15	Lieutenant General Kensaku Yoshioka	6 August 1923	1 May 1925
16	Lieutenant General Rokuichi Koizumi	1 May 1925	2 March 1926
17	Lieutenant General Toyoki Takada	2 March 1926	26 July 1927
18	Lieutenant General Kametaro Arai	26 July 1927	16 March 1929
19	General Kenkichi Ueda	16 March 1929	22 December 1930
20	Lieutenant General Kōhei Kashii	22 December 1930	29 February 1932
21	General Kotaro Nakamura	29 February 1932	5 March 1934
22	General Yoshijirō Umezu	5 March 1934	1 August 1935
23	General Hayao Tada	1 August 1935	1 May 1936
24	Lieutenant General Kanichiro Tashiro	1 May 1936	12 July 1937
25	Lieutenant General Kiyoshi Katsuki	12 July 1937	26 August 1937

=== Chief of Staff ===
	Name	From	To
1	Major General Kenji Matsumoto	10 August 1928	1 August 1931
2	Major General Toshijiro Takeuchi	1 August 1931	9 January 1932
3	Major General Monya Kikuchi	9 January 1932	1 August 1934
4	General Takashi Sakai	1 August 1934	2 December 1935
5	Major General Takenori Nagami	2 December 1935	1 August 1936
6	Major Gumu Hashimoto	1 August 1936	26 August 1937
