= Battle of Lanfeng order of battle =

The following units and commanders fought in the Battle of Lanfeng in May 1938.

== China ==
1st War Area - Cheng Qian

- Eastern Honan Army - Xue Yue
  - 64th Army - Li Han-huen
    - 155th Division - Chen Kung-hsin
    - 187th Division - Peng Ling-cheng
  - 8th Army - Huang Chieh
    - 40th Division - Lo Li-jung
    - 102nd Division - Po Hui-chang
  - 74th Army - Wang Yaowu
    - 51st Division - Wang Yao-wu
    - 58th Division - Feng Sheng-fa
- 71st Army Song Xilian
  - 87th Division [2]
  - 88th Division - Long Muhan

Reinforcements [May22nd]

- 17th Corps - Hu Zongnan - May22nd
  - 1st Army - Li Tieh-chun
    - 1st Division - Li Tieh-chun
    - 78th Division - Li Wen
  - 27th Army - Kuei Yung-ching
    - 36th Division [2] - Chiang Fu-sheng
    - 46th Division - Li Liang-yung
  - 200th Division (1st Column) - Qiu Qingquan
    - Tank battalion *
    - Infantry battalion
    - Engineer battalion
    - Armored car battalion
    - Antiaircraft unit
    - Motor maintenance unit
    - Antitank battalion

Note:

- * Tanks of the 1st Column's armoured battalion would have been equipped with new Soviet T-26 tanks. (There is some photographic evidence that there were some of the Italian CV-33 tanks there as well. One was photographed on the Lanfeng battlefield with three Japanese troops examining it. see photo and discussion http://www.china-defense.com/forum/index.php?showtopic=512)

== Japan ==
North China Area Army - Juichi Terauchi [1,3]

1st Army - Kyoji Kotsuki

- 14th Division - Kenji Doihara
  - 27th Infantry Brigade
    - 2nd Infantry Regiment
    - 59th Infantry Regiment
  - 28th Infantry Brigade
    - 15th Infantry Regiment
    - 50th Infantry Regiment
  - 20th Field Artillery Regiment
  - 18th Cavalry Regiment
  - 14th Engineer Regiment
  - 14th Transport Regiment

Note: IJA 1st Army had these armoured units directly under its command that could have been assigned to 14th Division: [3]

- 1st Independent Light Armored Car Squadron
- 5th Independent Light Armored Car Squadron
- 2nd Tank Battalion

== Sources ==
[1] Hsu Long-hsuen and Chang Ming-kai, History of The Sino-Japanese War (1937-1945) 2nd Ed., 1971. Translated by Wen Ha-hsiung, Chung Wu Publishing; 33, 140th Lane, Tung-hwa Street, Taipei, Taiwan Republic of China.

page 230-235

Map. 9-2

[2] German trained Division. Note these divisions had been badly mauled in the battles of Shanghai and of Nanking in 1937 and were no longer the crack units they once were.

[3] 抗日战争时期的侵华日军序列沿革 (Order of battle of the Japanese army that invaded China during the Sino Japanese War)

[4] 國軍精銳---國民革命軍第二○○師 Elite Troops of the National Revolutionary Army, the 200th Division, (in Chinese)

- Translation
