= Events preceding World War II in Asia =

This article is concerned with the events that preceded World War II in Asia.

== Noteworthy events ==
The following events played a significant role in setting the stage for the involvement of Asia and the Pacific in World War II:

- 1839: Outbreak of the First Opium War in Qing China against the British Empire, forcing China to import British opium from India. Britain won the war and as a result gained control over Hong Kong.
- 1853: Commodore Matthew Perry's fleet arrives in Tokyo Bay and forces the Tokugawa Shogunate to allow trade with American merchants with threat of military action.
- 1856: Outbreak of the Second Opium War or the Arrow War in China. Resulting Treaties of Tianjin at 1858, Treaty of Aigun, etc., Unequal Treaties and also burning, looting of the Old Summer Palace and New Summer Palace. "Beyond any doubt, by 1860 the ancient civilization that was China had been thoroughly defeated and humiliated by the West."
- 1858: Western nations force Japan to sign the Unequal Treaties. These articles established export and import tariffs and the concept of "extraterritoriality" (i.e. Japan held no jurisdiction over foreign criminals in its land. Their trials were to be conducted by foreign judges under their own nation's laws). Japan had no power to change these terms.
- 1868: Japan, in an effort to modernize and prevent future Western dominance, ousts the Tokugawa Shogunate and adopts a new Meiji Emperor. The next few decades see arguably the most rapid and successful industrialization of any economy in world history during the Meiji Restoration.
- 1884-1885: A failed diplomatic solution over Vietnam independence results in Tonkin War.
- 1894–1895: The First Sino-Japanese War ends in Japanese victory, results in Japanese dominance in Korea and Japanese control of the Liaodong Peninsula (later returned to China for payment), Taiwan and Penghu Islands. Balance of power in Asia permanently altered.
- 1899: With newly gained power from recent industrialization, Japan successfully renegotiates aspects of the Unequal Treaties.
- 1899–1901: The Boxer Rebellion led China to a humiliating defeat by the Eight-Nation Alliance of Western powers including the United States and Japan, ceding more territory, and dealing one of the final blows to the struggling Qing dynasty.
- 1904–1905: The Russo-Japanese War begins with a surprise attack and ends by an eventual Japanese victory over Imperial Russia. Japanese control over Korea until World War II is assured.
- 1910: Empire of Japan annexes Korea.

=== Republic of China era ===
- 1911: The 1911 Revolution overthrows the Manchu Qing dynasty and establishes the Republic of China. Warlord factions, however, continue to fight for personal gains, resulting in near-constant warfare as the Chinese Nationalists struggle to gain international recognition and support while bringing peace to volatile regions of China.
- 1914: During World War I Japan and other Allies seize German colonial possessions.
- 1919: The May Fourth Movement erupts in Beijing to protest to the Chinese government’s weak response to the Treaty of Versailles. Japan, as a member of the victorious Allies during World War I, gains a mandate over various Pacific islands previously part of the German colonial empire. The primary island chains are the Marshall Islands, Marianas, the Carolines, and Truk Lagoon. Japan joins the League of Nations.
- 1921: Foundation of the Chinese Communist Party.
- 1922: The Washington Naval Treaty is signed, limiting the fleets and vessels of the navies of the United States, United Kingdom, Japan, France, and Italy. Japan is limited to about two-thirds of the fleet allowed for the United States and Britain. This is seen in Japan as a denial of Japanese equality amongst European powers.
- 1924: Vladimir Ilyich Lenin dies in Moscow. After internal political intrigues, primarily against Leon Trotsky, Joseph Stalin takes power over the Soviet Union a year later. The first congress of the Kuomintang under Sun Yat-Sen is held in Guangzhou.
- 1925: Dr. Sun Yat-sen dies in Beijing. After internal political intrigues, primarily against Wang Jingwei, Chiang Kai-shek takes over the leadership of the KMT
- 1926: Hirohito becomes emperor upon his father's death.
- 1927: Open conflict between the Chinese Communist Party and the Kuomintang commences.
- 1928:
  - Jinan incident (May 1928)
  - Huanggutun incident (Japanese assassination of the Chinese head of state Generalissimo Zhang Zuolin on 4 June 1928)
  - Northeast Flag Replacement (Zhang Xueliang's announcement on 29 December 1928 that all banners of the Beiyang government in Manchuria would be replaced with the flag of the Nationalist government, thus nominally uniting China under one government)
- 1929: The Sino-Soviet conflict over the Manchurian Chinese Eastern Railway demonstrated the military weakness of the Republic of China (KMT). Later the Soviet Union sell its stocks to the Manchukuo government.
- 1930: The London Naval Treaty is signed, putting a halt to battleship production until 1937. Limitations on submarines and other surface combatants are also made.

== World War II in Asia ==
Many historians argue that World War II began with the Marco Polo Bridge Incident on July 7, 1937. While other historians believe the war began with the Mukden Incident in Manchuria on September 18, 1931. Japanese occupation of much of Asia would last until 1945.

=== 1931–37: Japan vs. China ===
- September 18, 1931: The Mukden Incident, known as the "9.18 Incident": Japanese agents blow up part of the Japanese owned South Manchurian Railroad at Mukden in northeastern China, and label it sabotage by Chinese forces. Using the incident as a pretext, the Japanese invasion of Manchuria is launched. Within six months the occupation of Manchuria is complete.
- January 28, 1932: The January 28 Incident: fighting erupts between Chinese boycotters and Japanese troops protecting the Japanese section of Shanghai. The Japanese dispatch a naval invasion force in an attempt to capture Shanghai. However, the invasion ended in a stalemate. United Kingdom and United States broker a cease-fire between China and Japan three months after the hostilities begin.
- February, 1932: Manchukuo is announced as an independent nation, in reality a Japanese puppet government for Manchuria. It encompassed the three northeastern Chinese provinces occupied by Japan since the "9.18 Incident." Japanese control remains direct however, and Japanese owned interests gain considerable power. Additionally, the opium trade is encouraged. Manchukuo was not recognized by the League of Nations and Japan subsequently withdraws from the organization.
- May, 1932 May 15 incident: Japanese Prime Minister Inukai Tsuyoshi assassinated by a group of young officers for his support of the London Naval Treaty, which is seen in Japan as preventing parity of forces.
- January 1934, the Soviet Union invades the Republic of China in the Soviet Invasion of Xinjiang.
- October, 1934 – November, 1935: The Chinese Communists led by Mao Zedong conduct the Long March, retreating from Jiangxi to Yan'an in Shaanxi.
- December 29, 1934: Japan abrogates the Washington Naval Treaty.
- December, 1935: Large-scale anti-Japanese riots take place in Beiping (now called Beijing)
- February, 1936 February 26 Incident: Japanese junior officers coup attempt.
- November, 1936: Japan joins Germany in signing the Anti-Comintern Pact, concluded to provide a two-front threat to the Soviet Union. Japan is however not interested in being drawn into a European war, and thus the pact is not a true alliance.
- December 25, 1936: Xi'an Incident: Arrest of Chiang Kai-shek by Zhang Xueliang leads to Second United Front alignment against Japan.
- July 7, 1937: Marco Polo Bridge Incident. Japanese forces conducting military exercises outside Beijing claimed that several Japanese soldiers were not accounted for after the exercise. Japanese launch an all-out assault. Nanjing government declares its intent to resist Japan, marking the start of the Second Sino-Japanese War. (Note: For political reasons, war was not declared by either side at this point. The Chinese declaration of war came on December 8, 1941).

=== 1937–39: The War expands ===
- August–October 1937: the Soviet Union invades the Republic of China in the Xinjiang War (1937)
- August–November 1937: Full-scale fighting erupts throughout northern China, and Japan overcomes initial failures with landings and reinforcements in Shanghai. Before the Battle of Shanghai, the Tokyo government announced that Japan would complete the conquest of Shanghai in three days, and all of China within three months. KMT troops held Shanghai for over three months.

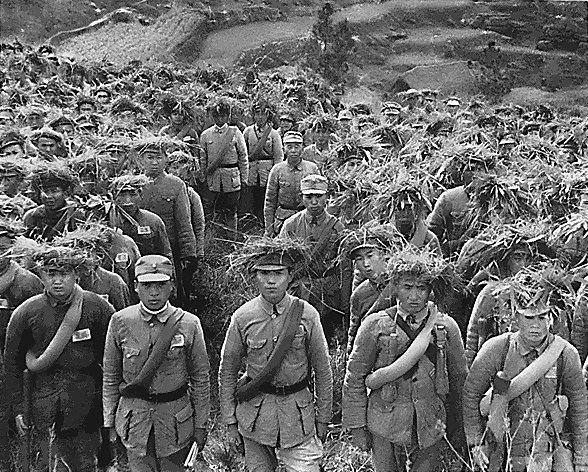
Chinese soldiers poorly armed.

- December 1937: the city of Nanjing is captured and subjected to months of the rampage. The Nanjing Massacre resulted in the deaths of up to 200,000 Chinese civilians. This is in line with the Three Alls Policy: kill all, burn all, loot all.
- April, 1938: Chinese Nationalists gain a major victory over Japanese forces in Shandong province.
- June, 1938: The Japanese advance along the Yellow River is halted by the breaking of dams by the Chinese. The surprise flood kills many Japanese but also as many as 1,000,000 civilians.
- July, 1938: Japanese forces provoke a battle with the Soviets at Lake Hassan in Manchukuo. The Soviets handily defeat the Japanese.
- October, 1938: The Japanese Central China Army captures Hankou in the Battle of Wuhan, ending their advance up the Yangtze River. Landings near Hong Kong capture Canton, cutting off of the Chinese Nationalists from ocean ports.
- November, 1938: The New Order for East Asia is declared by Japan. This declaration of Japanese plans for dominance of East Asia further deteriorates their relations with western nations.
- February, 1939: Japan captures Hainan Island, which is seen to have strategic implications by the British.
- May–September, 1939: Japan and the Soviet Union engage in border clashes around the Khalka River in Mongolia, culminating in the Battles of Khalkhin Gol. Crushing defeats lead the Strike South Group to avoid conflict against the powerful Red Army.
- July, 1939: The United States announces its withdrawal from its commercial treaty with Japan.

=== The conquest of Southeast Asia and the road to Pearl Harbor ===
- September 1940: Japan invades French Indochina.
- April, 1941: American volunteer pilots secretly recruited in U.S. Their first actual combat will be in December 1941 in Burma where they will begin to wreak havoc upon Japanese forces and will soon be named the Flying Tigers.
- June 22, 1941: Germany invades the Soviet Union in what became known as Operation Barbarossa.
- August, 1941: The United States, which at the time supplied 80% of Japanese oil imports, initiates a complete oil embargo. This threatens to cripple both the Japanese economy and military strength once the strategic reserves run dry, unless alternative oil-sources can be found.
- December 7, 1941: Japan invades Hong Kong, Guam, Malaya and The Philippines shortly after attacking Pearl Harbor. The United States, the Netherlands and the United Kingdom formally declare war on Japan the next day.

== See also ==
- Second Sino-Japanese War
- Germany–Japan relations
- World War II
- Causes of World War II
- Events preceding World War II in Europe
- Nanjing Massacre
