= Shigeyasu Suzuki =

- 鈴木 重康
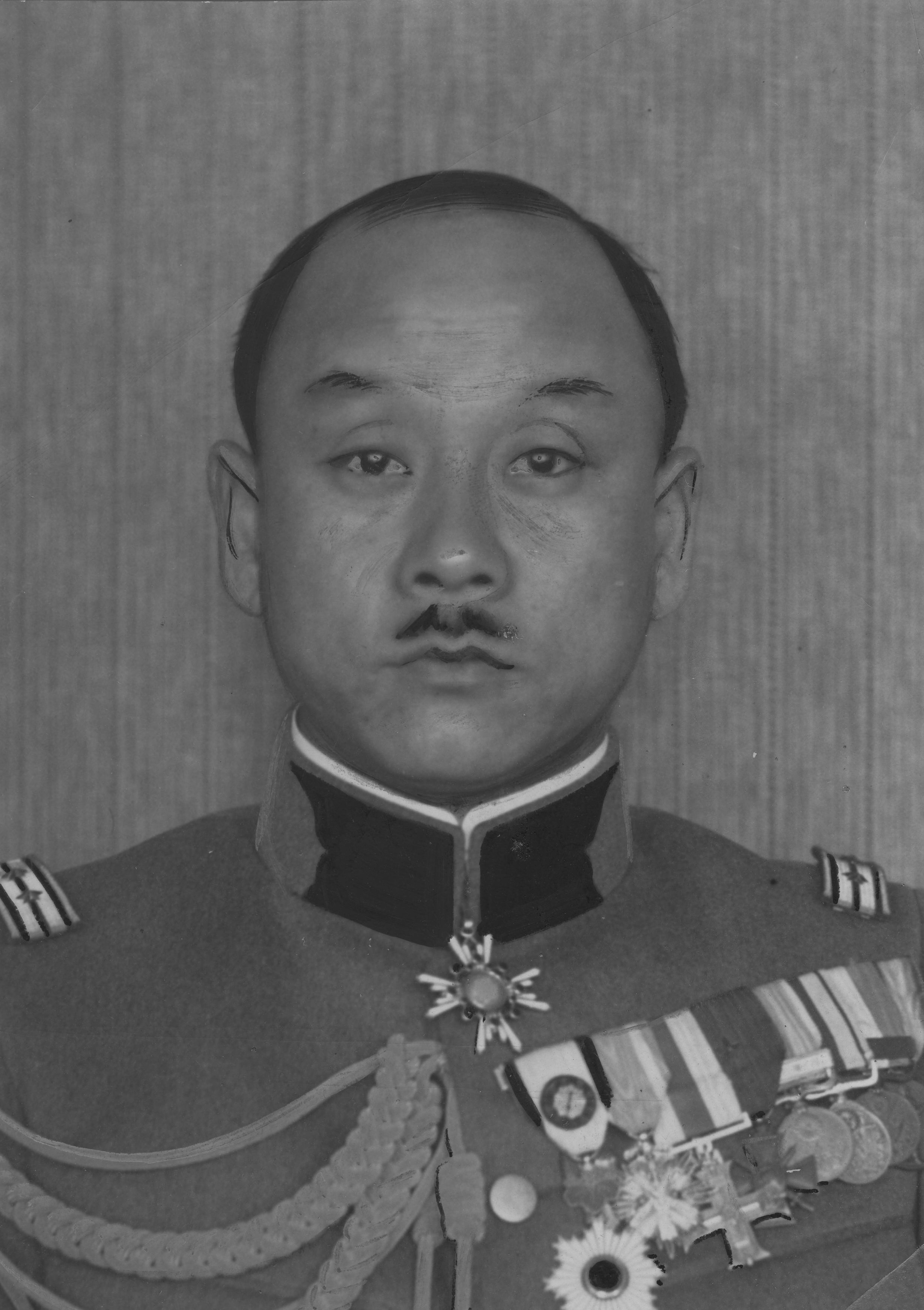
- Born: September 1, 1886; Ishikawa Prefecture, Japan
- Died: June 11, 1957 (aged 70)
- Military career
- Allegiance: Empire of Japan
- Branch: Imperial Japanese Army
- Service years: 1905 -1938
- Rank: Lieutenant General
- Commands: Guards 1st Regiment; 11th Independent Mixed Brigade (Imperial Japanese Army); 12th Division (Imperial Japanese Army)
- Conflicts: Second Sino-Japanese War

Shigeyasu Suzuki (鈴木 重康, Suzuki Shigeyasu; 1 September 1886 – 11 June 1957) was a lieutenant general in the Imperial Japanese Army during the early part of the Second Sino-Japanese War. His elder brother, Suzuki Minoru was a major general in the Imperial Japanese Army Medical Corps.

== Biography ==
The second son of a former samurai in the service of Kaga Domain, Suzuki was born in Ishikawa prefecture and attended military preparatory schools in Nagoya. He graduated from the 17th class of the Imperial Japanese Army Academy in 1905 and was assigned to the IJA 35th Infantry Regiment. After leaving 24th class of the Army Staff College in 1912, he has served as a military attaché to the Empire of Russia from 1916 to 1918, and was thus witness to many of the events of the Russian Revolution and the overthrow of the Romanov dynasty. After his return to Japan, he became Chief of Staff of the IJA 12th Division.

Suzuki was promoted to lieutenant colonel in March 1924 and was attached to the Imperial Japanese Army General Staff from December of that year. In 1927 he was attached to 34th Regiment of the IJA 3rd Division. He was subsequently posted to Poland as military attaché in February 1928 and concurrently to Latvia in September 1929. He was promoted to colonel in March 1928. Returning to the Army General Staff in June 1930, he was made the Chief of 2nd Section (Maneuvers), in the 1st Bureau. He then commanded of the Guards 1st Regiment from August 1931 to August 1932.

In March 1933, he was promoted to major general, and served as an instructor at the Army Staff College from August 1932 to March 1934. From 1934 to 1935 he was head of the 4th Bureau in the General Staff, and head of the 1st Bureau from 1935 to 1936.

In December 1936, shortly before the outbreak of the Second Sino-Japanese War, Suzuki was promoted to lieutenant general. He was given command of the IJA 11th Independent Mixed Brigade under the aegis of the Kwantung Army, and saw combat in the Battle of Beiping-Tianjin, Operation Chahar, and in the Battle of Taiyuan. Recalled to Japan in October 1937, Suzuki became commandant of the Narashino Chemical Warfare School until he retired at the end of December 1938.

After his retirement from military service, Suzuki was chairman of the rationing board of the Japanese automobile industry until the end of the war. He died in 1957.
