= Operation Chahar =

1937 military campaign in China

- Part of the Second Sino-Japanese War and the interwar period
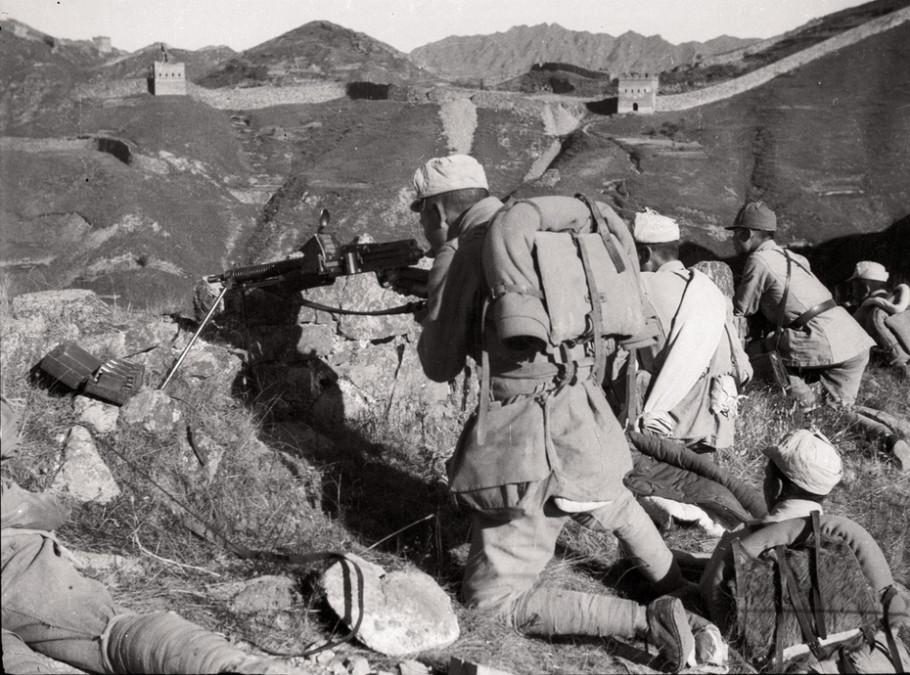
- Chinese soldiers, pictured by the Great Wall of China in Laiyuan in 1937
Date	8 August 1937 – 17 October 1937 (2 months, 1 week and 2 days)
Location	Vicinity of Beiping city and Chahar province – Suiyuan province, Inner Mongolia region, Republic of China
Result	Japanese victory

Belligerents
Japan: Mengjiang; Manchukuo	China

Commanders and leaders
Kiyoshi Katsuki; Shigiyasu Suzuki; Seishirō Itagaki; Hideki Tojo; Demchugdongrub	Tang Enbo; Chiang Kai-shek; Yan Xishan; Fu Zuoyi

Strength
90,000 Kwantung Army troops 60,000 Inner Mongolia and Manchukuo troops	7,432 officers and 122,910 soldiers

Casualties and losses
Chinese Claim : 8,652 casualties Japanese Claim : 5th division : 1,482 casualties 2nd mixed brigade in the battle of Zhangjiakou : 529 casualties 15th mixed brigade in the battle of Datong : 176 casualties 1st and 11th independent mixed brigades : 902 casualties	Western Claim : 26,000 casualties Chinese Claim : 15,710 killed 34,080 wounded 479 missing

Operation Chahar (Japanese: チャハル作戦, romanized: Chaharu Sakusen), known in Chinese as the Nankou Campaign (Chinese: 南口戰役; pinyin: Nankou Zhanyi), occurred in August 1937, following the Battle of Beiping-Tianjin at the beginning of Second Sino-Japanese War.

This was the second attack by the Kwantung Army and the Inner Mongolian Army of Prince Demchugdongrub on Inner Mongolia after the failure of the Suiyuan Campaign. The Chahar Expeditionary Force was under the direct command of General Hideki Tōjō, the chief of staff of the Kwantung Army. A second force from the Beiping Railway Garrison Force, later the 1st Army under General Kiyoshi Katsuki, was also involved.

== Japanese Order of battle ==
The Chinese forces opposing this invasion of Suiyuan were the Suiyuan Pacification Headquarters under the command of General Yan Xishan. Fu Zuoyi, the governor of Suiyuan, was made commander of the 7th Group Army, and Liu Ruming, governor of Chahar, was made its deputy commander, defending Chahar with the 143rd Division and two Brigades. General Tang Enbo was sent by Chiang Kai-shek with the 13th and 17th Armies from the Central Army and made Frontline Commander in Chief. The 1st Cavalry Army was sent to Chahar under the command of Zhao Chengshou, facing the Mongolian forces of Demchugdongrub.

== Chinese Order of battle ==
Following the loss of Beiping, Tang Enbo's 13th Army (4th and 89th Divisions) took up positions in depth along the Peking–Suiyuan Railway at Nankou, and further to the rear at Juyongguan (Juyong Pass). Gao's 17th Army stationed its 84th Division at Chicheng (赤诚), Yanqing (延庆), and Longguan, covering the flank of the 13th Army from Japanese forces in Chahar. The 21st Division was deployed in Huailai, on the railroad to the rear of Tang's forces. Zhao Chengshou's (赵承绶）1st Cavalry Army, Liu Ruming's （刘汝明) 143rd Division, and two Peace Preservation Brigades began an attack on the Mongol forces in northern Chahar.

== Battles around Nankou ==
On August 8, the Japanese 11th Independent Mixed Brigade, commanded by Gen. Shigiyasu Suzuki, began their attack on the left flank of the 13th Corps position at Nankou, but were thwarted after three days by the difficult terrain and the stubborn resistance of the Chinese. A new attack on August 11, supported by tanks and aircraft, took Nankou Station, after which Gen. Suzuki's brigade advanced on Juyong Pass.

That same day, Chiang Kai-shek ordered the activation of the 14th Group Army (10th, 83rd, and 85th Divisions) under Gen. Wei Lihuang. Coming by rail from Yingchia-chuang to Yi County, elements of the 14th Group Army were sent on a ten-day march through the plains west of Beiping in a flanking movement in support of Tang Enbo's forces. The Chinese 1st Army Region made attacks on the Japanese forces in Liangxiang and Chaili to distract them, and sent a detachment to Heilung Pass to cover the advance of 14th Group Army. From the dates on a Japanese map of the battle, these forces did not reach the area until September, when it was too late, and clashed with Japanese forces from September 9–17 without achieving its objective.

On August 12, Tang Enbo's army counterattacked, surrounding the Japanese and cutting them off from their supplies and communications. On August 14, Seishirō Itagaki's 5th Division was sent to the relief of the 11th Independent Mixed Brigade at Juyongguan.

On August 16, Itagaki arrived at Nankou and began an enveloping attack on the right flank of 13th Army, making a five pronged attack at Huanglaoyuan. The 7th Brigade of 4th Division under Shi Jue was moved to block this maneuver, and reinforcements of Li Xianzhou's 21st Division and Zhu Huaibing's 94th Division were brought up, engaging in days of heavy fighting. On August 17 General Yan Xishan, Director of the Taiyuan Pacification Headquarters, directed the 7th Group Army, under Fu Zuoyi, to move its 72nd Division and three brigades by rail from Datong to Huailai to reinforce Tang Enbo's forces.

== Battle of the Great Wall ==
Meanwhile, in northern Chahar the Chinese 1st Cavalry Army captured Shangdu, Nanhaochan, Shangyi and Huade from the puppet Mongolian Army of Demchugdongrub. Elements of the 143rd Division took Zhongli, while its main force reached Zhangbei. During this Chinese advance the Japanese Chahar Expeditionary Force under Lt. General Hideki Tōjō, composed of the mechanized 1st Independent Mixed Brigade and the 2nd and 15th Mixed Brigades, gathered for a counteroffensive from Zhangbei to Kalgan.

From August 18–19, the Chahar Expeditionary Force counterattacked from Zhangbei, and took Shenweitaiko on the Great Wall and the Hanno Dam. The scattered and poorly equipped Chinese forces were unable to stop the Japanese, who now threatened the Peking–Suiyuan Railway at Kalgan. On August 20 Gen. Fu Zuoyi's 7th Group Army diverted its 200th and 211th Brigades, which had been moving south by rail to join Gen. Tang Enbo's forces, back to defend Kalgan. Fu's remaining 72nd Division arrived to reinforce Chenpien, and his 7th Separate Brigade was sent to defend the railhead at Huailai.

On August 21, the Japanese forces broke through at the villages of Henglingcheng (横岭城) and Chenbiancheng (镇边城) Gen. Tang Enbo's forces awaiting reinforcement; but, having suffered over 50% casualties, still defended Huailai, Juyong Pass, and Yenqing. Liu Ruming's 143rd Division fell back to defend Kalgan from the advancing Japanese.

On August 23, as Seishirō Itagaki's 5th Division pushed toward Huailai from Chenpien against Ma Yenshou's 7th Separate Brigade, advance elements of the 14th Group Army arrived on the Japanese flank at Chingpaikou, driving off the Japanese outpost there and contacting the Japanese forces advancing to Chenpien and the front beyond. However, they were delayed in crossing the Yongding River, and their attack was delayed until it was too late to stop the Japanese advance. Due to poor communications they also failed to link up with Gen. Tang En-po's forces during the battle. After 8 days and 8 nights fighting, Itagaki, on August 24, linked up with the Kwantung Army's 2nd Independent Mixed Brigade at Xiahuayuan.

== Withdrawal ==
On August 26, Gen. Tang Enbo's forces were ordered to break out toward the Sangchien River while Liu Ruming's forces were ordered to withdraw to the far side of the Hsiang-yang River.

On August 29, the Japanese unit, called the Oui Column by the Chinese and the Ohizumi Detachment (大泉支隊) by the Japanese, attacked. According to Hsu Long-hsuen this unit moved south from Tushihkou, and on August 30 attacked Yenching via Chihcheng, but was repulsed by the Chinese 17th Army. The unit moved to Guyuan (沽源) on August 25 and to Xuanhua (宣化) by September 7, cutting the railroad in the rear of Tang's forces and east of Chinese forces along the Great Wall.

According to the Chinese account, after repulsing the Oui Column's attack the Chinese 17th Army withdrew to join the rest of Tang Enbo's force on the far side of the Sangchien River. Kalgan fell to the Japanese on August 27. After Gen. Fu Zuoyi's 200th and 211th Brigades failed in a counterattack to recapture Kalgan, Fu's forces fell back to the west to defend the railway to Suiyuan at Chaikoupao. This brought an end to Operation Chahar.

According to Time magazine, on September 4, the Japanese-aligned South Chahar Government was set up at Kalgan. After the fall of Kalgan, Chahar's "complete independence" from China was declared by "100 influential persons", headed by Demchugdongrub, a pro-Japanese Mongolian who had long been the head of the "Inner Mongolia for Inner Mongolians" movement. It was Demchugdongrub, with his Mongolian levies, who helped the Japanese to take Kalgan. Demchugdongrub was rewarded for his collaboration with the highest position in this new Japanese puppet state, the Mongol United Autonomous Government.

Notes

- Ohizumi Detachment (大泉支隊). It was a battalion from 4th Infantry Regiment of 2nd Division under the Kwantung Army. But, its course is different than the Chinese account says. It moved from Guyuan (沽源) to Xuanhua (宣化).

== Sources ==
- Hsu Long-hsuen and Chang Ming-kai, History of The Sino-Japanese War (1937–1945) 2nd Ed., 1971. Translated by Wen Ha-hsiung, Chung Wu Publishing; 33, 140th Lane, Tung-hwa Street, Taipei, Taiwan Republic of China. Pg. 180- 184 and Map 3
- Jowett, Phillip S., Rays of The Rising Sun, Armed Forces of Japan's Asian Allies 1931–45, Volume I: China & Manchuria, 2004. Helion & Co. Ltd., 26 Willow Rd., Solihull, West Midlands, England.
- Perry–Castañeda Library Map Collection, China 1:250,000, Series L500, U.S. Army Map Service, 1954- . Topographic Maps of China during the Second World War.
  - Chang-Chia-K'ou(Kalgan) nk50-10 Area of fighting on Great Wall and east of Nankou.
- Perry–Castañeda Library Map Collection, Manchuria 1:250,000, Series L542, U.S. Army Map Service, 1950- . Topographic Maps of Manchuria during the Second World War.
  - Cheng Te nk50-11 Nankou area.
