= Daisaku Kōmoto =

Imperial Japanese army officer (1883–1955)

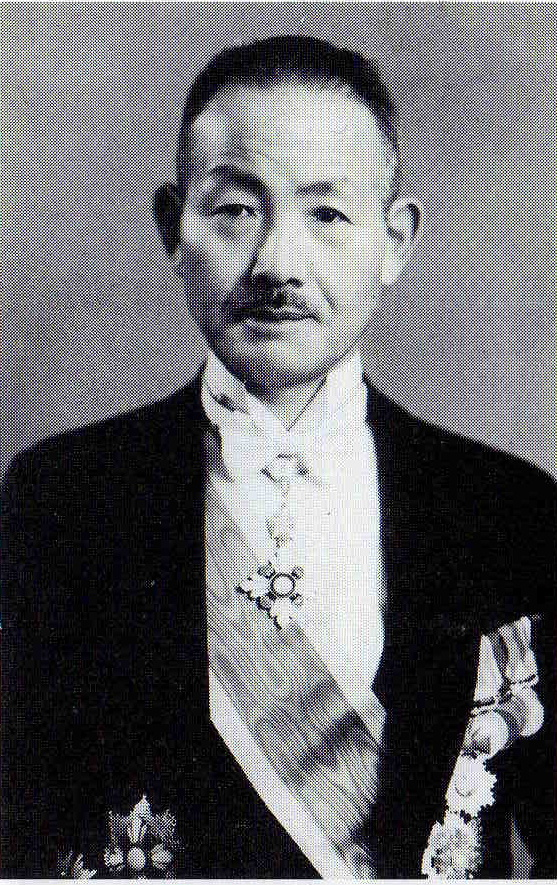
- Native name: 河本 大作
- Born: January 24, 1883; Mikazuki, Sayō Districg, Hyōgo Prefecture, Japan
- Died: August 25, 1955 (aged 72) Taiyuan, Shanxi, China
- Allegiance: Empire of Japan
- Branch: Imperial Japanese Army
- Service years: 1903–1929
- Rank: Colonel
- Conflicts: Russo-Japanese War
- Awards: Order of the Pillars of State, 1st class Order of the Auspicious Clouds, 2nd class
- Memorials: Tōkyō-ji, Fuchū, Tokyo
- Other work: Director of the South Manchuria Railway; Chairman of the Manchuria Coal Mining Company; President of Shanxi Industrial Company

Daisaku Kōmoto (河本 大作, Kōmoto Daisaku; January 24, 1883 – August 25, 1955) was an officer in the Japanese Imperial Japanese Army active during the early Shōwa period. He held the rank of colonel. He is known as the mastermind of the assassination of Zhang Zuolin.
