= Huanggutun incident =

Assassination of Zhang Zuolin in 1928

Coordinates: 41°48′32″N 123°24′12″E

- Part of the Northern Expedition
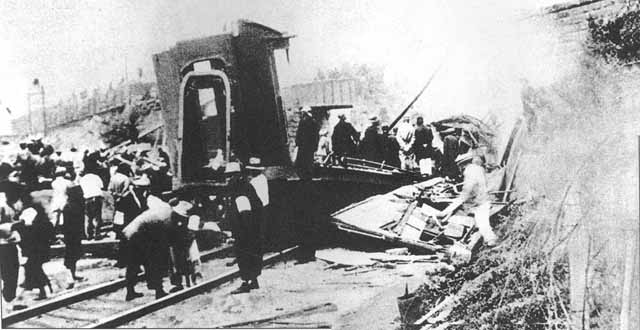
- Huanggutun railway station shortly after the explosion
- Native name: 皇姑屯事件
- Location: Shenyang, Fengtian clique
- Date: 4 June 1928; 98 years ago 5:23 AM (UTC+08:00)
- Target: Zhang Zuolin
- Attack type: Assassination by bombing
- Weapon: Picric acid explosives
- Deaths: Several (including Zhang)
- Perpetrator: Colonel Daisaku Kōmoto of the Kwantung Army
- Assailants: Captain Kaneo Tōmiya; First Lieutenant Sadatoshi Fujii
- No. of participants: 2
- Motive: Desire to install a pro-Japanese leader in Manchuria

The Huanggutun incident (Chinese: 皇姑屯事件; pinyin: Huánggū Tún Shìjiàn), also known as the Zhang Zuolin Explosion Death Incident (Japanese: 張作霖爆殺事件, Hepburn: Chō Sakurin bakusatsu jiken) in Imperial Japan, was the assassination of Fengtian clique warlord Zhang Zuolin, who was the acting president of the Republic of China and the last head of state of the Beiyang government, on early morning of June 4, 1928. Zhang, whose National Pacification Army was being defeated by the Nanjing government's Second Northern Expedition, was returning to Shenyang from Beijing when his personal train carriage was destroyed by a massive bomb explosion at an overpass near the Huanggutun railway station, mortally injuring Zhang (who died hours later) and killing his associate Wu Junsheng. The explosives, consisting of about 120 kg (260 lb) of picric acid, were planted by the Kwantung Army, the colonial detachment of the Imperial Japanese Army in Manchuria.

Although the Kwantung Army had wanted to remove the increasingly defiant Zhang in order to advance Japan's interests in Manchuria, Zhang's death had undesirable outcomes as Japan was not yet ready to capitalize on Zhang's death, and the incident was concealed as "A Certain Important Incident in Manchuria" (満州某重大事件, Manshū bō jūdai jiken) in Japan, with numerous Japanese right-wingers trying to blame the incident on the Soviets. Zhang's son and heir Zhang Xueliang, realizing the Japanese threat, agreed to peacefully submit to the Nationalist government at the end of 1928, marking the end of the Warlord Era, and in 1929 arrested and executed the pro-Japanese general Yang Yuting, whom the Kwantung Army had been grooming to replace Zhang. The fallout from the incident delayed the Japanese invasion of Manchuria for several years until the Mukden Incident in 1931.

== Background ==
Following the Xinhai Revolution of 1911, China dissolved in spontaneous devolution, with local officials and military leaders assuming power independent of control by the weak central government. In Northern China, the once-powerful Beiyang Army split up into various factions after the death of Yuan Shikai in 1916. Zhang Zuolin, the leader of the Fengtian clique, was one of the most powerful warlords and managed to seize control of Manchuria, then consisting of nine provinces.

At the time of the First United Front in 1924, foreign support in China was generally divided as follows:

- Fengtian clique – Japan
- Zhili clique – Europe and United States
- Kuomintang – Soviet Union

The Fengtian clique's support from abroad was Japan, which had vested economic and political interests in the region dating from the end of the Russo-Japanese War and was interested in exploiting their region's largely-untapped natural resources. The Japanese Kwantung Army, based in the Kwantung Leased Territory, also had responsibility for safeguarding the South Manchurian Railway and so had troops stationed in Manchuria, providing material and logistical support for the Fengtian clique. The co-operation initially worked to the benefit of both parties. Zhang provided security for the railroad and Japanese economic interests, suppressing Manchuria's endemic banditry problem and allowing extensive Japanese investments. The Imperial Japanese Army assisted Zhang in the First and Second Zhili–Fengtian Wars, including the suppression of the anti-Fengtian uprising by General Guo Songling, a senior Fengtian clique leader. However, Zhang wanted Japan's aid only to consolidate and expand his territory, but Japan envisioned a future joint occupation of Manchuria with Zhang. After he had achieved his objectives, he tried to improve relations with the United States and the United Kingdom by allowing both countries open access to the trade, investment and economic opportunities in Manchuria that he had allowed only to the Japanese.

That change in policy came while Japan was in the midst of a severe economic crisis from the 1923 Great Kantō Earthquake and successive economic depressions, and it caused both alarm and irritation in the Kwantung Army leadership. The situation was further complicated by the success of the Northern Expedition, led by Chiang Kai-shek of the National Revolutionary Army, in which the Kuomintang successively defeated Sun Chuanfang, Wu Peifu and other warlords of the Northern Faction and the Beijing government, controlled by Zhang Zuolin. As Zhang seemed to be shifting his allegiance in the direction of the Nationalists, the prospect of Nationalist control of Manchuria seemed increasingly likely. The Kwantung army leadership, in contrast, saw its mission as establishing effective control over Manchuria, which it considered to be a frontline in the struggle between Japan and the West, and building a model of a new society there. It hoped that assassinating Zhang would induce Japanese Prime Minister Tanaka Giichi to support a more aggressive policy in Manchuria.

== Events ==
=== Explosion ===
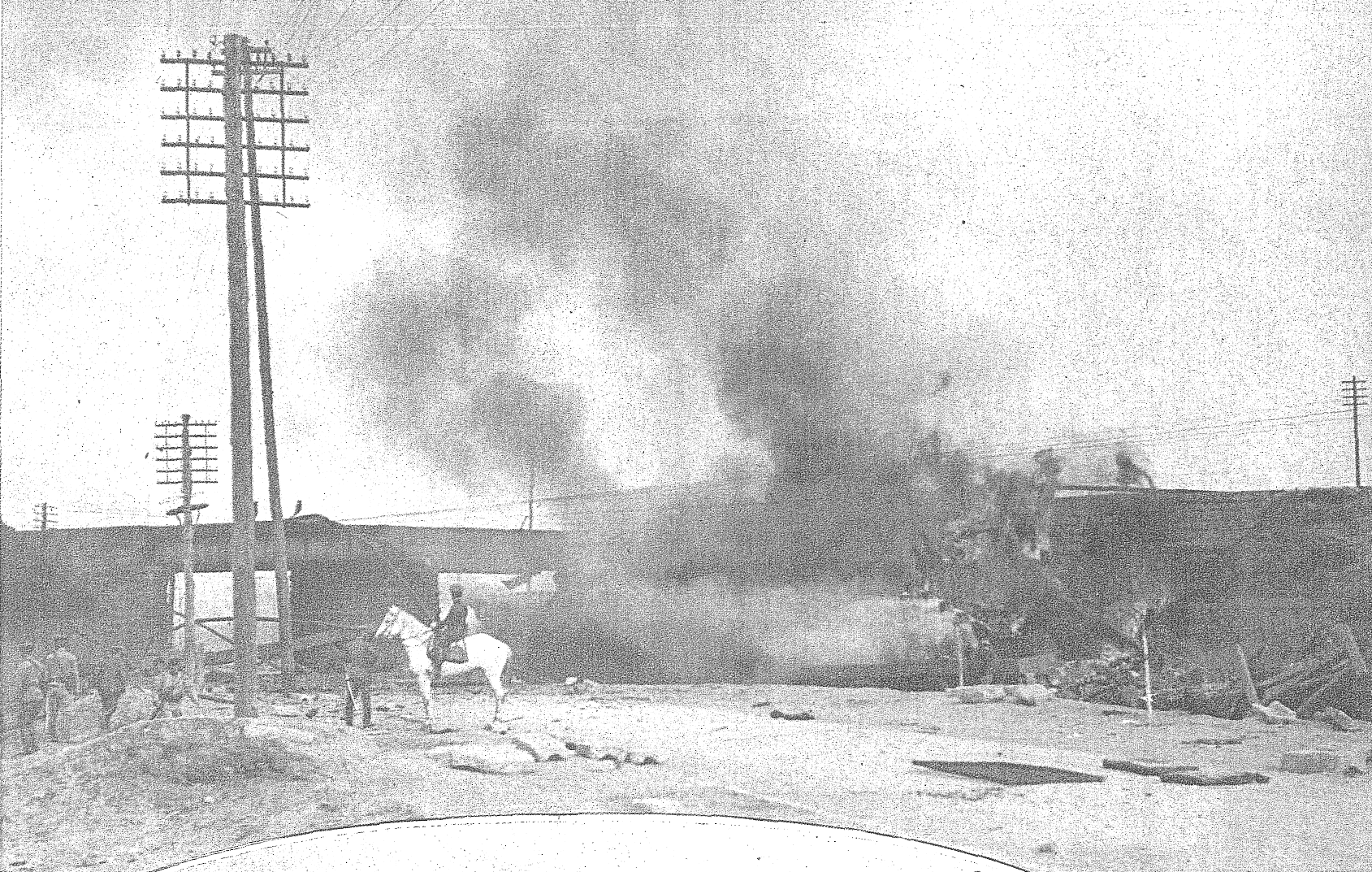
Fire from Zhang Zuolin's train

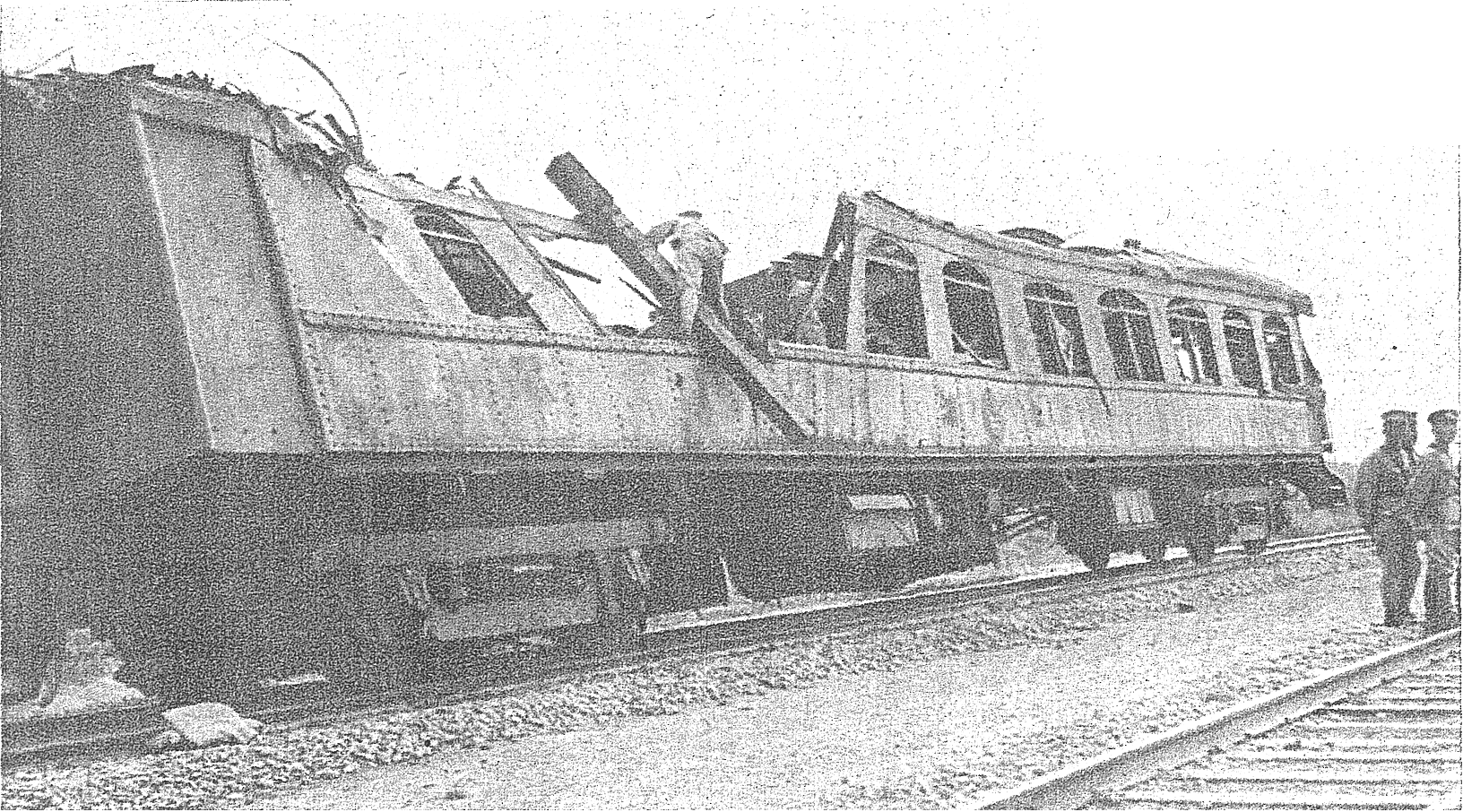
Wreck of Zhang Zuolin's saloon coach

Zhang left Beijing to go to Shenyang by train on the night of 3 June 1928. The train traveled along the Jingfeng Railway, a route that was heavily patrolled by his own troops. The only location along the railway that was not under Zhang's control was a bridge several kilometres east of Huanggutun Railway Station on the outskirts of Shenyang, where the South Manchuria Railway crossed the Jingfeng Railway via a bridge.

Colonel Daisaku Kōmoto, a junior officer in the Kwantung Army, believed that the assassination of Zhang would be the most expeditious way of installing a new leader more amenable to Japanese demands and planned an operation without direct orders from Tokyo. Japanese China expert Tōichi Sasaki claimed that he had given Kōmoto this idea. Kōmoto's subordinate, Captain Kaneo Tōmiya, was in charge of executing the plan. The bomb itself was planted on the bridge by Sapper First Lieutenant Sadatoshi Fujii.

At night, Zhang sat in his carriage with one of his Japanese advisors, Major Seiya Giga, feeling safe as long as Giga remained in the compartment. They spent most of the night playing mahjong and drinking beer. A few miles from Mukden station, Major Giga claimed he had to attend to his luggage. He hurried to the rear platform of the last carriage, curled up in a blanket and waited.

When Zhang's train passed the bridge at 5:23 a.m. on 4 June, the bomb exploded. Several of Zhang's officials, including the governor of Heilongjiang province Wu Junsheng (吳俊升), died immediately. Zhang was mortally wounded and sent back to his home in Shenyang. He died several hours later. Major Giga survived, shaken but unharmed.

=== Aftermath ===
At the time of the assassination, the Kwantung Army was already in the process of grooming Yang Yuting, a senior general in the Fengtian clique, to be Zhang's successor. However, the actual assassination apparently took even the Kwantung Army leadership off guard since troops were not mobilized and the Kwantung Army could not take any advantage by blaming Zhang's Chinese enemies and using the incident as a casus belli for a Japanese military intervention. Instead, the incident was roundly condemned by the international community and by both military and civilian authorities in Tokyo itself. The emergence of Zhang's son Zhang Xueliang as successor and leader of the Fengtian clique also came as a surprise.

== Consequences ==
Zhang was de jure head of state because he held the absolute power over the internationally-recognized Beiyang government, based in Beijing, which meant that the incident would be a major scandal, if revealed. The younger Zhang, to avoid any conflict with Japan and chaos that might provoke the Japanese into a military response, did not directly accuse Japan of complicity in his father's murder but instead quietly carried out a policy of reconciliation with the Nationalist government of Chiang Kai-shek, which left him as the recognized ruler of Manchuria instead of Yang Yuting. The assassination thus considerably weakened Japan's political position in Manchuria.

Furthermore, the assassination, which was conducted by low-ranking officers, did not have the prior consent of the Imperial Japanese Army General Staff Office or the civilian government. However, there was reluctance to investigate the issue in the army leadership, and Japanese Prime Minister Tanaka Giichi found out the truth with difficulty. He then declared to his cabinet and to the Emperor his intention to punish the assassins. However, both the military and Tanaka's own ministers opposed doing so or disclosing who was responsible, arguing that proceeding against the plotters would be disadvantageous to Japan's military and foreign policy. Even the opposition parties in the Imperial Diet, which already knew or suspected the truth, decided to refrain from questioning and criticizing the government too intensely over the investigation for the same reason. Eventually Tanaka agreed to cover up the matter. Emperor Hirohito was also informed of the decision to do so and accepted that course of action at that point, if not earlier; at any rate, as supreme commander in chief, he was constitutionally responsible for punishing the crime and chose not to do so. Indeed, according to some scholars, it was pressure from the throne that forced Tanaka to adopt that course of action. Tanaka was nevertheless scolded by the Emperor in connection with his handling of the matter and had to resign.

To achieve its goals in Manchuria, the Kwantung Army was forced to wait several years before creating another incident to justify the invasion of Manchuria and subsequent establishment of the puppet state of Manchukuo, under Puyi, last emperor of Qing dynasty.

== See also ==
- Warlord era
  - Northern Expedition
- Events preceding World War II in Asia
  - Jinan incident (May 1928)
  - Northeast Flag Replacement (by Zhang Xueliang on 29 December 1928)
  - Japanese invasion of Manchuria
    - Mukden Incident (18 September 1931)

== Bibliography ==
- Beasley, William G. (1991). Japanese Imperialism, 1894–1945. Oxford University Press. ISBN 0-19-822168-1.
- Gordon, Andrew (2003). A Modern History of Japan: From Tokugawa Times to the Present. Oxford University Press. ISBN 0-19-511061-7.
- Jiang, Arnold Xiangze (1998). The United States and China. The University of Chicago Press. ISBN 0-226-39947-8.
- Spence, Johnathan D. (1990). The Search for Modern China. Norton & Sons. ISBN 0-393-30780-8.
- Tobe, Ryōichi (2016). Nihon rikugun to chūgoku: shinatsū ni miru yume to satetsu [The Japanese Army and China: The Dreams and Setbacks of its "China Experts"] (in Japanese). Chikuma Shobō. ISBN 978-4-480-09740-8.
