= Kiyoshi Katsuki =

Imperial Japanese Army lieutenant general (1881–1950)

- 香月 清司
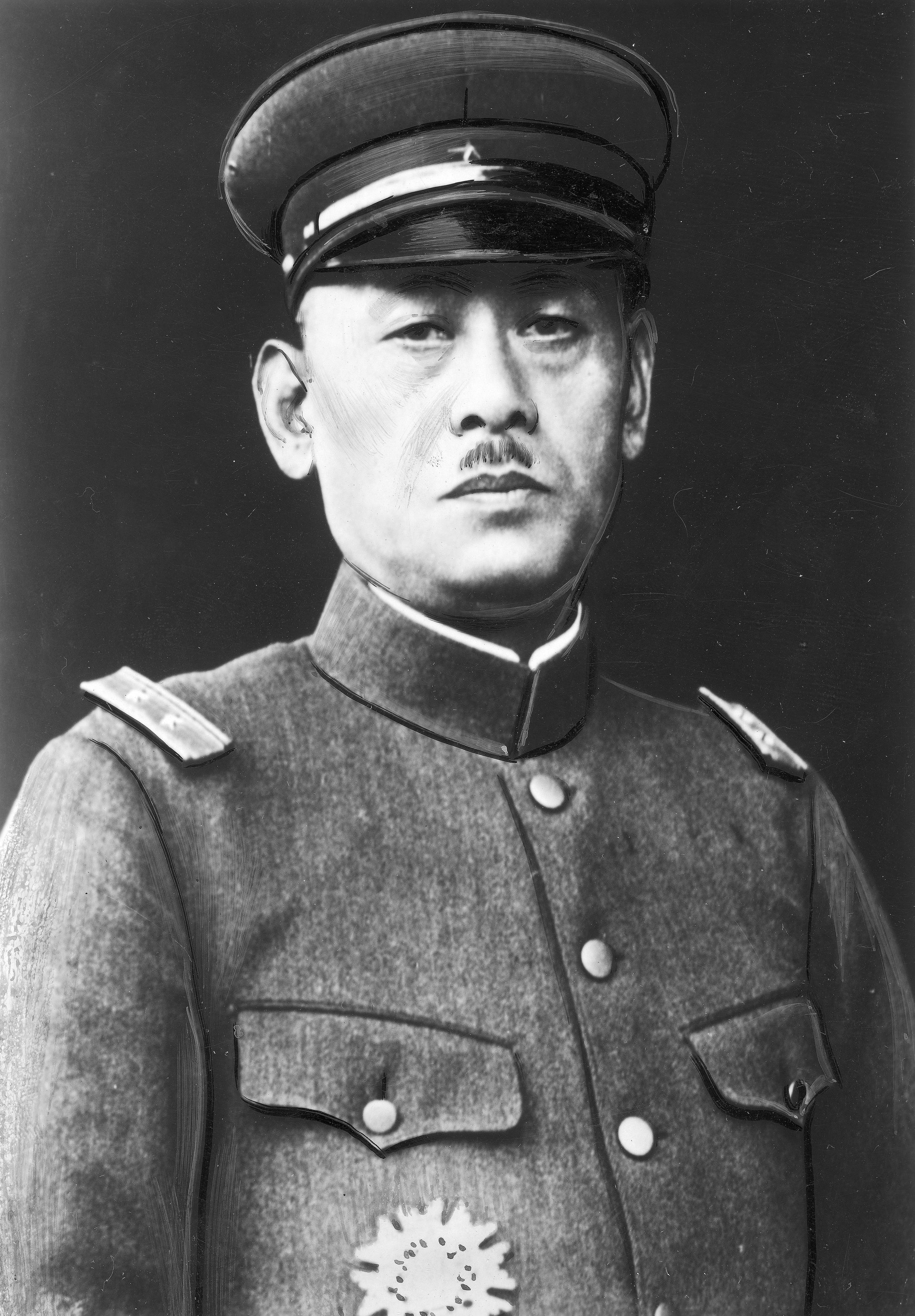
- Born: 6 October 1881; Saga, Japan
- Died: 29 January 1950 (aged 68)
- Education: Imperial Japanese Army Academy; Army Staff College
- Military career
- Allegiance: Empire of Japan
- Branch: Imperial Japanese Army
- Service years: 1902–1938
- Rank: Lieutenant general
- Units: Inspectorate General of Military Training; Imperial Japanese Army General Staff Office
- Commands: 60th Infantry Regiment, 8th Infantry Regiment, 30th Infantry Brigade, 12th Division, Imperial Guards Division, China Garrison Army, 1st Army
- Conflicts: Second Sino-Japanese War; Battle of Beiping–Tianjin; Operation Chahar; Beiping–Hankou Railway Operation; Battle of Northern and Eastern Henan; Battle of Lanfeng

Kiyoshi Katsuki (香月 清司, Katsuki Kiyoshi; 6 October 1881 – 29 January 1950) was a lieutenant general in the Imperial Japanese Army during the Second Sino-Japanese War.

== Biography ==
Katsuki was a native of Saga prefecture. He graduated from the 14th class of the Imperial Japanese Army Academy in 1902 and from the 24th class of the Army Staff College in 1912. Promoted to colonel in the infantry in 1923, he became commander of the IJA 60th Infantry Regiment the following year, and commander of the IJA 8th Infantry Regiment in 1925. In 1929, Katsuki was promoted to major general and given command of the IJA 30th Infantry Brigade.

After being promoted to lieutenant general in 1933, he served as Deputy Commandant of the War College until 1935. Katsuki was commander of the IJA 12th Division from 1935 to 1936, and then commander of the Imperial Guards Division from 1936-1937.

In early 1937, he became Deputy Inspector-General of Military Training until 12 July 1937, when he was called to replace Lieutenant General Kanichiro Tashiro as commander of the Japanese China Garrison Army after Tashiro had suddenly died a few days after the Marco Polo Bridge incident.

As commander of the IJA 1st Army from 26 August 1937, Katsuki presided over the early fighting in north China in the Second Sino-Japanese War, including the Beiping–Hankou Railway Operation. He remained IJA 1st Army commander until 30 May 1938, when he was recalled to the Imperial Army General Staff Office in Tokyo. He retired from active military service two months later.
