= Ōshima Hisanao =

Japanese general

Viscount Ōshima Hisanao
- 大島久直
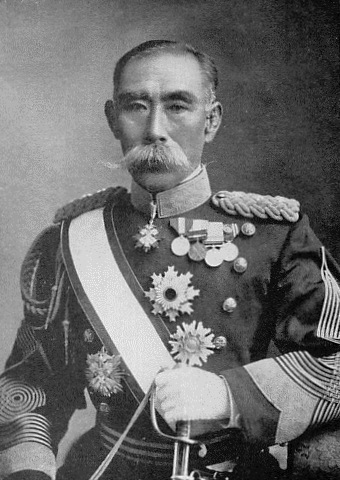
- Born: 1 October 1848; Akita Prefecture, Japan
- Died: 27 September 1920 (aged 71)
- Military career
- Allegiance: Empire of Japan
- Branch: Imperial Japanese Army
- Service years: 1870–1913
- Rank: General
- Conflicts: Boshin War; Satsuma Rebellion; First Sino-Japanese War; Russo-Japanese War

Viscount Ōshima Hisanao (大島久直, Hisanao Ōshima; 1 October 1848 – 27 September 1928) was a general in the early Imperial Japanese Army.

== Biography ==
Ōshima was the younger son of a teacher of sōjutsu ("art of the spear") of Akita Domain (present day Akita Prefecture). From 1868 to 1869 he fought during the Boshin War of the Meiji Restoration on the imperial side, and was commissioned as a lieutenant in the early Imperial Japanese Army. In December 1875, he was deputy chief-of-staff of the Tokyo Garrison. During the Satsuma Rebellion of 1877, he commanded a battalion.

He returned to the Tokyo Garrison after the war, serving in various posts, and was promoted to colonel in April 1887. In April 1889, he was appointed commander of the Guard’s Third Infantry Regiment and in June 1890 was commandant of the Army Staff College. In 1892, Ōshima was promoted to major general and was assigned command of the IJA 5th Infantry Brigade. In November 1893, he took over command of the IJA 6th Infantry Brigade, which he led in combat during the First Sino-Japanese War.

After the war, Ōshima served as chief-of-staff of the Taiwan Garrison and in August 1895 was elevated to the kazoku peerage with the title of baron (danshaku), and was also awarded the Order of the Golden Kite, 3rd class. He was promoted to lieutenant general in October 1898, and was assigned command of the newly formed IJA 9th Infantry Division. In 1903, he was awarded the Order of the Sacred Treasure, 1st class.

With the start of the Russo-Japanese War, Ōshima led the IJA 9th Division at the Siege of Port Arthur, under the overall command of General Nogi Maresuke’s Third Army. His forces played a major role in the bloody battle of Hill 203, and afterwards fought at the Battle of Mukden.

In April 1906, he was awarded the Grand Cordon of the Order of the Rising Sun, Gold Rays with Neck Ribbon and the Order of the Golden Kite, 2nd class and was promoted to general in May. In June, he was assigned command of the Imperial Guards. In September 1907, Ōshima was also elevated from baron to viscount (shishaku). In 1908, he was promoted to Inspector-General of Military Training, one of the three most powerful posts in the Imperial Japanese Army. He was subsequently named a military councilor in 1911 and entered the reserves in September 1913 and retired from service in 1918.

== Decorations ==
- 1885 – Order of the Rising Sun, 3rd class
- 1895 – Order of the Rising Sun, 4th class
- 1895 – Order of the Golden Kite, 3rd class
- 1895 – Order of the Sacred Treasure, 2nd class
- 1903 – Grand Cordon of the Order of the Sacred Treasure
- 1906 – Grand Cordon of the Order of the Rising Sun
- 1906 – Order of the Golden Kite, 2nd class
