= 11th Independent Mixed Brigade =

There were two 11th Independent Mixed Brigades in the Imperial Japanese Army.

== The original 11th IMB ==
The order of battle of the first 11th Independent Mixed Brigade in July 1937:

11th Independent Mixed Brigade

- 11th Independent Infantry Regiment
- 12th Independent Infantry Regiment
- 11th Independent Cavalry Company
- 11th Independent Field Artillery Regiment
- 12th Independent Mountain Gun Regiment
- 11th Independent Engineer Company
- 11th Independent Transport Company

This unit was involved in the Operation Chahar and Battle of Taiyuan in 1937, but soon after was recalled to Manchukuo where it was formed into the IJA 26th Division.

== The 11th IMB (1939-1945) ==
The order of battle of the second 11th Independent Mixed Brigade, which was formed in 1939, for garrison duties in China:

11th Independent Mixed Brigade

- 46th Infantry Battalion
- 47th Infantry Battalion
- 48th Infantry Battalion
- 49th Infantry Battalion
- 50th Infantry Battalion
- 11th IMB Artillery Battalion
- 11th IMB Engineer Company
- 11th IMB Light Antiaircraft Company
- 11th IMB Signal Unit

The brigade was in the Battle of West Henan–North Hubei.

== See also ==
- Independent Mixed Brigades (Imperial Japanese Army)
