= Battle of Northern and Eastern Henan =

Campaign of Northern and Eastern Henan
- Part of the Second Sino-Japanese War and the interwar period
Date	February 7 – June 10, 1938 (4 months and 3 days)
Location	Northern and Eastern part of Henan province in the Republic of China
Result	Japanese victory

Belligerents
China	Japan

Commanders and leaders
(Republic of China (1912–1949)) Cheng Qian	(Empire of Japan) Hisaichi Terauchi

Units involved
First Military Front	Japanese North China Area Army

Strength
349,800	Unknown

Casualties and losses
Chinese claim : 979 officers and 24,275 soldiers killed 1,453 officers and 24,284 soldiers wounded 451 officers and 10,785 soldiers missing	Chinese claim : 51 captured Japanese record : 14th division : 6,400 killed or wounded Other units : unknown

During the Second Sino-Japanese War, the Japanese 1st Army, under the command of Lt. General Kiyoshi Katsuki, drove General Cheng Qian's 1st War Area Chinese forces out of Northern and Eastern Honan. The Japanese advance continued until they were halted by the catastrophic 1938 Yellow River flood, which was caused by the Chinese Army diverting the Yellow River into the Jialu and Huai Rivers.
