= Kanichiro Tashiro =

Japanese general (1881–1937)

Kanichirō Tashiro
- 田代 皖一郎
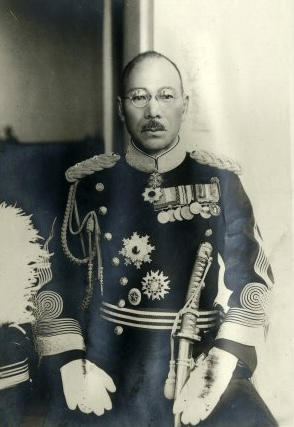
- Born: October 1, 1881; Taku, Saga, Japan
- Died: July 16, 1937 (aged 55); Tianjin, China
- Education: Imperial Japanese Army Academy; Army Staff College
- Military career
- Allegiance: Empire of Japan
- Branch: Imperial Japanese Army
- Service years: 1903–1937
- Rank: Lieutenant General
- Units: Imperial Army General Staff Office; Shanghai Expeditionary Army; Kwantung Army
- Commands: IJA 30th Infantry Regiment; IJA 27th Infantry Brigade; Shanghai Expeditionary Army; Kempeitai; 11th Infantry Division; Japanese China Garrison Army
- Conflicts: Second Sino-Japanese War; Marco Polo Bridge incident; Battle of Beiping–Tianjin
- Other work: Provost marshal

Kanichirō Tashiro (田代 皖一郎, Tashiro Kan'ichirō; 1 October 1881 – 16 July 1937) was a lieutenant general in the Imperial Japanese Army at the start of the Second Sino-Japanese War.

== Biography ==
A native of Saga Prefecture, Tashiro graduated from the 15th class of the Imperial Japanese Army Academy in 1903 and the 25th class of the Army Staff College in 1913. He was on the staff of the Japanese delegation to the Washington Disarmament Conference in 1921. On his return to Japan, he served in a number of administrative positions within the Imperial Army General Staff Office, including a stint from 1923 to 1924 when he was stationed in Hankou, China. Promoted to colonel in the infantry in 1924, he was given command of the IJA 30th Infantry Regiment.

Tashiro became Vice Chief of the 5th Section (Asian Intelligence), 2nd Bureau within the General Staff in 1926, and was considered an expert on China. He was promoted to major general in 1930, when he was given command of the IJA 27th Infantry Brigade. In 1932, he was promoted to Chief of Staff of the Shanghai Expeditionary Army. During the First Shanghai Incident, his commander, General Yoshinori Shirakawa was assassinated and he served as interim commander of the Shanghai Expeditionary Army, but resigned due to ill health. He was reassigned as commander of the Kempeitai within the Kwantung Army in Manchukuo from 1933 to 1934, and was promoted to lieutenant general in 1934. He then served as provost marshal from 1934 to 1935.

He returned to the field as commander of the IJA 11th Division from 1935 to 1936. He was then made commander of the Japanese China Garrison Army from May 1936 to July 1937, and was thus the leading Japanese officer at the time of the Marco Polo Bridge incident from July 7 to 9. However, Tashiro was hospitalized for heart illness and died in Tianjin on July 16, 1937, only a week later.

== Decorations ==
- 1934 – Order of the Sacred Treasure, 2nd class
- 1937 – Grand Cordon of the Order of the Sacred Treasure
