= First Army (Japan) =

Japanese First Army
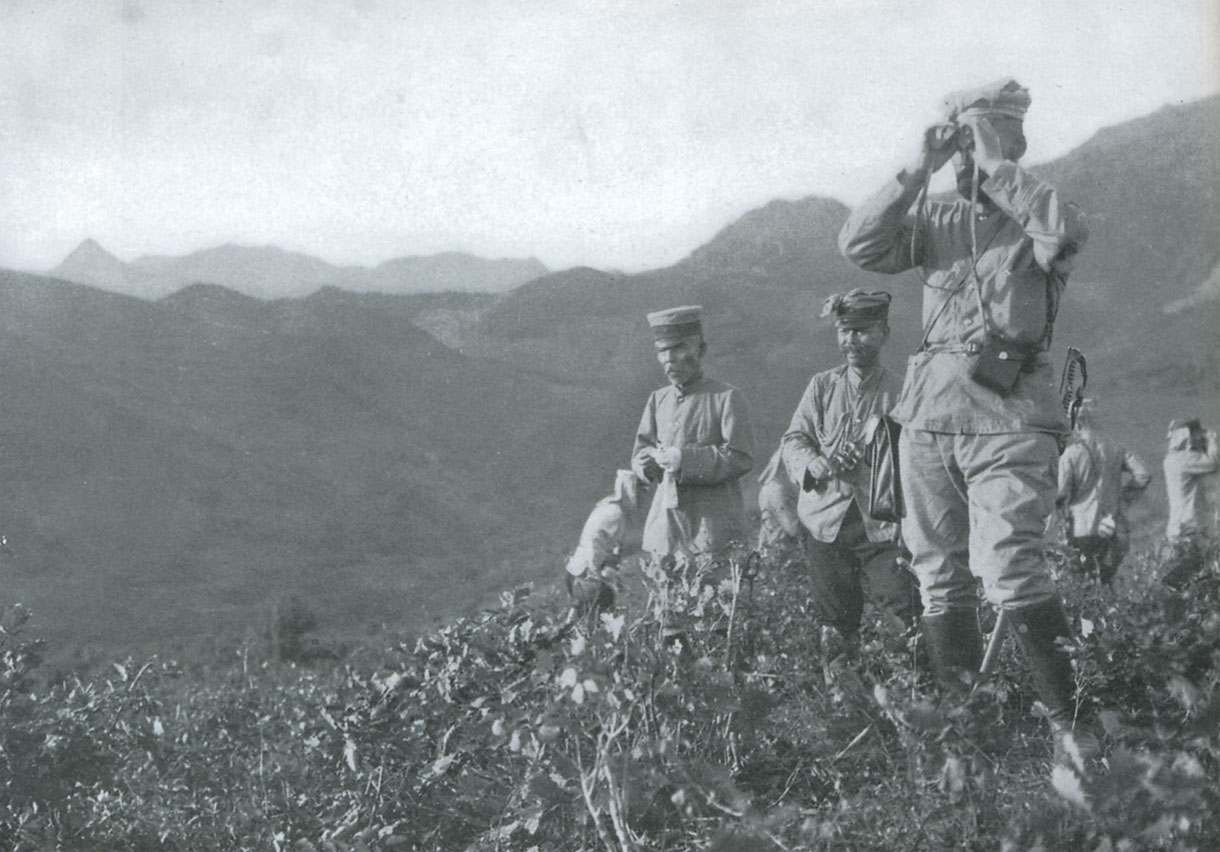
- Japanese General Kuroki and his Chief of Staff Shigeta Fujii
- Active: September 1894 – September 1945
- Country: Empire of Japan
- Branch: Imperial Japanese Army
- Type: Infantry
- Role: Corps
- Nicknames: Otsu (乙, Second)
- Engagements: First Sino-Japanese War; Russo-Japanese War; Second Sino-Japanese War; World War II

The Japanese 1st Army (第1軍, Dai-ichi gun) was an army of the Imperial Japanese Army. It was raised and demobilized on three occasions.

== History ==
The Japanese 1st Army was initially raised during the First Sino-Japanese War from 1 September 1894 – 28 May 1895 under the command of General Yamagata Aritomo. It participated in all of the major battles of that conflict, and was demobilized at the successful end of that war.

It was revived for the Russo-Japanese War from 2 February 1904 – 9 December 1905 under the command of General Kuroki Tamemoto. Its forces were the first to land in Korea and Manchuria and it fought in most of the major campaigns of the war, including the Battle of Yalu River, Battle of Motien Pass, Battle of Liaoyang, Battle of Shaho, Battle of Sandepu, and Battle of Mukden. It was again demobilized at the end of that conflict.

The Japanese 1st Army was raised again on 26 August 1937 in Tianjin, China under the Japanese China Garrison Army. In addition to protecting the Japanese settlement at Tianjin, it served as a reinforcement to the newly formed Japanese Northern China Area Army following the Marco Polo Bridge Incident during the Second Sino-Japanese War. The 1st Army subsequently participated in various campaigns in North China under the operational command of the Japanese Northern China Area Army, including the North China Incident, Beiping–Hankou Railway Operation, and the Battle of Taiyuan before being demobilized at Taiyuan, Shanxi province after the end of World War II on 30 September 1945.

== List of Commanders ==
=== Commanding officer ===
	Name	From	To
1	Marshal Yamagata Aritomo	1 September 1894	19 December 1894
2	Marshal Nozu Michitsura	19 December 1894	28 May 1895
X	demobilized	28 May 1895	2 February 1904
3	Marshal Kuroki Tamemoto	2 February 1904	9 December 1905
X	demobilized	9 December 1905	31 August 1937
4	Lieutenant General Kiyoshi Katsuki	26 August 1937	30 May 1938
5	General Yoshijirō Umezu	30 May 1938	7 September 1939
6	Lieutenant General Yoshio Shinozuka	7 September 1939	20 June 1941
7	Lieutenant General Yoshio Iwamatsu	20 June 1941	1 August 1942
8	General Teiichi Yoshimoto	1 August 1942	22 November 1944
9	Lieutenant General Raishiro Sumida	22 November 1944	30 September 1945

=== Chief of Staff ===
	Name	From	To
1	Major General Ogawa Mataji	1 September 1894	28 May 1895
X	demobilized	28 May 1895	2 February 1904
2	Major General Fujii Shigeta	2 February 1904	9 December 1905
X	demobilized	9 December 1905	26 August 1937
3	26 August 1937	27 January 1938	
4	Major General Shōjirō Iida	27 January 1938	9 November 1938
5	Lieutenant General Senichi Kushibuchi	9 November 1938	9 March 1940
6	Major General Ryukichi Tanaka	9 March 1940	2 December 1940
7	Major General Hideyoshi Kusuyama	2 December 1940	1 December 1941
8	Lieutenant General Tadashi Hanaya	1 December 1941	23 October 1943
9	Major General Ichimaro Horike	23 October 1943	16 December 1944
10	Major General Michitake Yamaoka	16 December 1944	September 1945
