= 65th Division (Imperial Japanese Army) =

- Active: 1943 - 1945
- Country: Empire of Japan
- Branch: Imperial Japanese Army
- Type: Infantry
- Role: garrison
- Garrison/HQ: Lu'an
- Nickname: Expert Division
- Engagements: Second Sino-Japanese War

Commanders
- Notable commanders: Shizuo Sakaguchi

The 65th Division (第65師団, Dai-rokujūgo Shidan) was an infantry division of the Imperial Japanese Army. Its call sign was the Expert Division (専兵団, Sen Heidan). It was formed on 1 May 1943 in Anhui province, simultaneously with the 62nd, 63rd and 64th divisions as a security (type C) division. The nucleus for the formation was the 13th Independent mixed brigade from Lu'an. As a security division, it lacked an artillery regiment. The men of the division were drafted from the Aichi mobilization district.

== Action ==
The 65th division was permanently assigned to the 13th army. Initially garrisoning Lu'an, its zone of responsibility was stretched to Xuzhou too, because the 17th division was departing for New Britain and Solomon Islands. The 65th division was garrisoning the assigned areas till the surrender of Japan 15 August 1945.

== See also ==
- List of Japanese Infantry Divisions
- Independent Mixed Brigades (Imperial Japanese Army)

== Notes ==
- This article incorporates material from Japanese Wikipedia page 第65師団 (日本軍), accessed 14 June 2016

== Reference and further reading ==
- Madej, W. Victor. Japanese Armed Forces Order of Battle, 1937-1945 [2 vols]

Allentown, PA: 1981
