= 64th Division (Imperial Japanese Army) =

- Active: 1943 - 1946
- Country: Empire of Japan
- Branch: Imperial Japanese Army
- Type: Infantry
- Role: garrison
- Garrison/HQ: Yangzhou
- Nickname(s): Open Division
- Engagements: Operation Ichi-Go

The 64th Division (第64師団, Dai-rokujūyon Shidan) was an infantry division of the Imperial Japanese Army. Its call sign was the Open Division (開兵団, Kai Heidan). It was formed on 1 May 1943 in Hubei province, simultaneously with the 62nd and 63rd divisions as a security (type C) division. The nucleus for the formation was the 12th Independent Mixed Brigade from Chuzhou. As a security division, it lacked an artillery regiment. The men of the division were drafted from the Hiroshima mobilization district.

== Action ==
On 10 July 1943, the 64th division was assigned to the 20th army. The division was then garrisoned in Yangzhou, Jiangbei District, Ningbo, Zhenjiang, and Wuxi. With the 11th army planning the Battle of Changsha in March 1944, the 64th division was reassigned to the Changsha area.

The 64th division started to participate in Operation Ichi-Go from October 1944. It was still in Changsha on the day of the surrender of Japan on 15 August 1945.

The divisions were able to concentrate at headquarters from 6 September 1945. On 1 May 1946 evacuation started via the Yueyang - Wuchang - Hankou - Zhengzhou - Xuzhou - Nanjing route, finally arriving in Shanghai on 10 June 1946. On 20 June six parties sailed from Shanghai to Sasebo and were demobilized on 15 July 1946. 79 men left Shanghai on 24 June 1946, and arrived at Kagoshima on 2 July to be immediately demobilized. The first large batch, the veterinary department and other auxiliaries, totaling 344 men, sailed from Shanghai on 25 June 1946, arriving at Sasebo on 26 June 1946, and at Fukuoka on 1 July 1946. That batch was demobilized on 6 July 1946. On 1 July 1946, main divisional troops started to depart from Shanghai, and the last batch of 532 soldiers was demobilized in Uraga on 1 August 1946.

== See also ==
- List of Japanese Infantry Divisions

== Notes ==
- This article incorporates material from Japanese Wikipedia page 第64師団 (日本軍), accessed 13 June 2016

== Reference and further reading ==
- Madej, W. Victor. Japanese Armed Forces Order of Battle, 1937-1945 [2 vols]

Allentown, PA: 1981
