= Battle of Okinawa =

Major 1945 battle of the Pacific War

- Part of the Volcano and Ryukyu Islands campaign of the Pacific War (World War II)
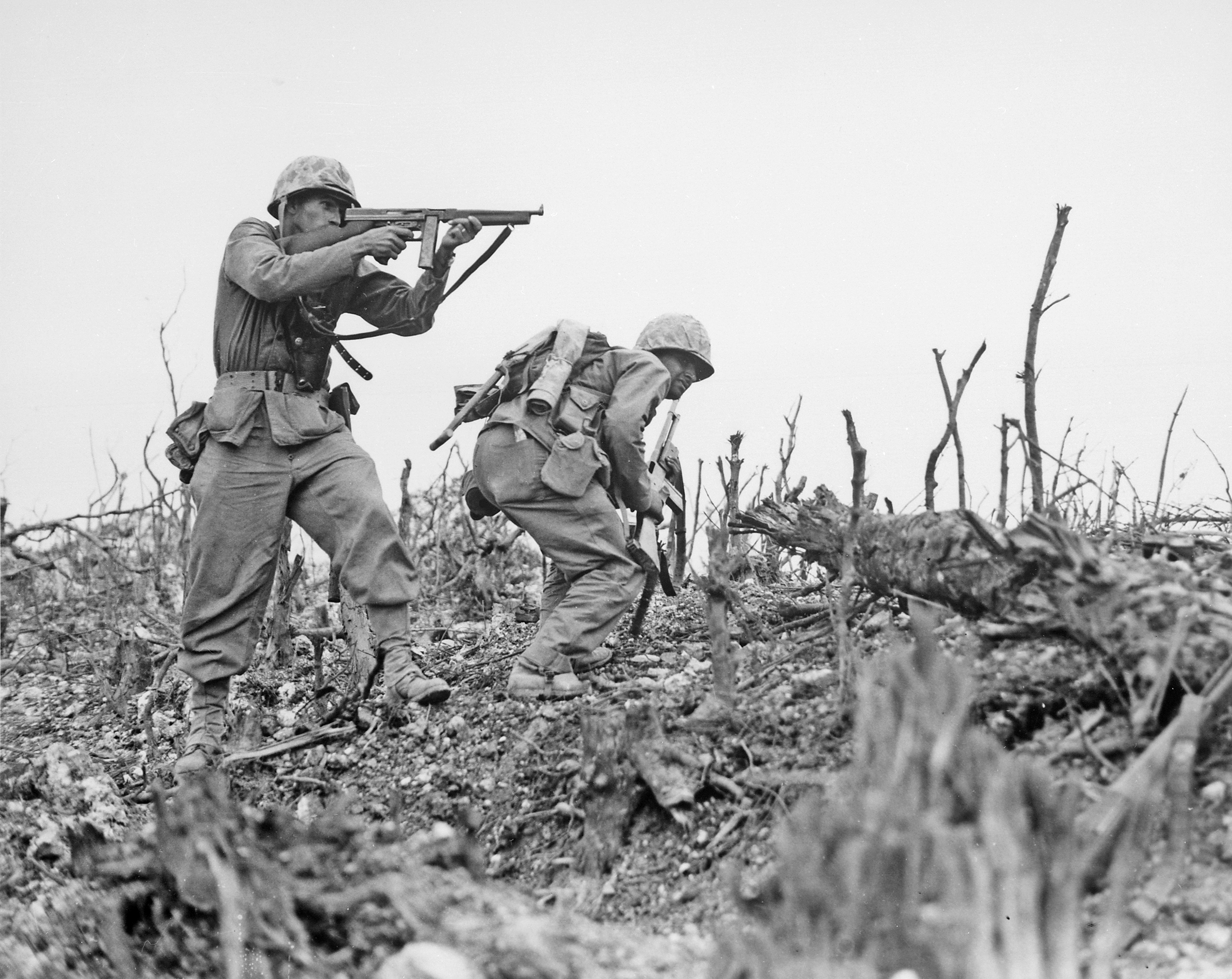
- 1st Marine Regiment during fighting at Wana Ridge during the Battle of Okinawa, May 1945
Date	1 April – 22 June 1945 (2 months and 3 weeks)
Location	Okinawa Island and Prefecture, Ryukyu Islands, Japan 26°30′N 128°00′E
Result	Allied victory

Belligerents
Ground forces: United States; Naval forces: United States; United Kingdom; Australia; New Zealand; Canada	(Empire of Japan) Japan

Commanders and leaders
COMPACFLT: Chester W. Nimitz; Tenth Army: Simon Bolivar Buckner Jr. †; Roy Geiger; John R. Hodge; Fifth Fleet: Raymond A. Spruance; Richmond K. Turner; Bernard Rawlings; Marc Mitscher	32nd Army: Mitsuru Ushijima ‡‡; Isamu Chō ‡‡; Hiromichi Yahara (POW); Combined Fleet: Soemu Toyoda; Minoru Ōta ‡‡; Special Attack Force: Seiichi Itō †

Units involved
Ground units: Tenth Army: III Amphibious Corps; 1st Marine Division; 2nd Marine Division; 6th Marine Division; XXIV Corps; 7th Infantry Division; 27th Infantry Division; 77th Infantry Division; 305th Infantry Regiment; 306th Infantry Regiment; 307th Infantry Regiment; 96th Infantry Division; 382nd Infantry Regiment; 1st Reconnaissance Battalion; Naval units: Fifth Fleet: Task Force 50; Task Force 58; (United Kingdom) Task Force 57; Joint Exp. Force	Ground units: (Empire of Japan) 32nd Army: 24th Infantry Division; 28th Infantry Division; 62nd Infantry Division; 44th Mixed Brigade; 45th Mixed Brigade; 59th Mixed Brigade; 60th Mixed Brigade; 27th Tank Regiment; Naval units: Combined Fleet: 2nd Fleet

Strength
United States Navy: 7 fleet carriers, 6 light carriers, 18 escort carriers, 8 fast battleships, 10 old battleships, 14 heavy cruisers, 17 light cruisers, 132 destroyers, 45 destroyer escorts; (United Kingdom) Royal Navy: 5 fleet carriers; 6 escort carriers; 2 fast battleships; 4 light cruisers; 12 destroyers; 251 carrier based aircraft; (United Kingdom) Royal Australian Navy: 4 destroyers; (United Kingdom) Royal New Zealand Navy: 2 light cruisers; (United Kingdom) Royal Canadian Navy: 1 light cruiser; Ground forces ~541,000 in Tenth Army; ~183,000 combat troops rising to ~250,000	(Empire of Japan) Imperial Japanese Navy: 1 battleship; 1 light cruiser; 8 destroyers; 1815 aircraft (of which 1050 were kamikazes); Imperial Japanese Army Air Service: 850 kamikazes; Ground forces: ~76,000+ Japanese soldiers; ~40,000+ Okinawan conscripts and boeitai

Casualties and losses
(United States) American personnel: Battle casualties: ~50,000, including ~12,500 dead Army: 19,929 (Note: 3,672 killed in action, 16,027 wounded (of whom 995 died), 58 captured (of whom 37 died), 172 missing (of whom 14 were declared dead as of 31 December 1946). The number for wounded only includes those who were hospitalized. Tenth Army's after action report lists a somewhat higher total of 22,564, including 4,549 killed or died of wounds, 18,010 wounded or injured, and 95 missing.); Navy: 10,007 at Okinawa, (Note: 3,803 killed, 219 died of wounds, 5,985 surviving wounded.) 1,294 on USS Franklin (Note: 807 killed, 487 wounded. Richard B. Frank points out that the Navy's Medical History excludes losses suffered on Franklin from its total for Okinawa; they are instead recorded under "Bombardment of Kyushu Island and Japan." This largely accounts for the discrepancy with the more commonly cited total of 4,907.); Marines: 19,460 (Note: 2,846 killed, 530 died of wounds, 67 missing, presumed dead, and 16,017 wounded. Due to the methodology of casualty accounting practices in World War II, a significant number of those who died of wounds were double counted as wounded in action.); Non-battle casualties: 26,211 to 33,096 (all causes); British personnel: Battle casualties: 119 killed 83 wounded 228 aircraft lost 4 fleet carriers damaged in kamikaze strikes Total casualties: ~76,000 to 84,000; Materiel: 375 tanks damaged, disabled, or destroyed 13 destroyers sunk 15 amphibious ships sunk 8 other ships sunk 386 ships damaged 763 aircraft lost	(Empire of Japan) Japanese personnel: Battle & non-battle casualties: 94,136 soldiers and sailors dead (all causes) (Note: 65,908 from outside Okinawa, 28,228 from Okinawa. Okinawa number includes civilians drafted into military units.); 4,037 dead from Yamato task force 7,401 captured (by 30 June)〜16,346 captured(by the end of November) (Note: Excludes 3,339 laborers and 15 civilian combatants. By the end of November, this total increased to 16,346 across all categories.); Total casualties: ~105,000 to 110,000; Materiel: 1 battleship sunk 1 light cruiser sunk 5 destroyers sunk 9 other warships sunk 1,430 aircraft lost 27 tanks destroyed 743–1,712 artillery pieces, anti-tank guns, mortars and anti-aircraft guns lost
- 40,000–150,000 civilians dead (Note: Hayashi (cited above) lists, in addition to the 28,228 Okinawan military personnel – many of whom were poorly trained and equipped civilians – 55,246 other civilians who directly aided the military in some way and 38,754 others who died. Historian Masayasu Oshiro criticizes the last figure as low, writing that it excludes deaths from starvation and malaria. Oshiro believes 150,000 total Okinawan dead, including the 28,000 directly attached to the military, is a more accurate number.)
- Location within Japan Battle of Okinawa (Pacific Ocean)

The Battle of Okinawa (Japanese: 沖縄戦, Hepburn: Okinawa-sen), codenamed Operation Iceberg, was a major battle of the Pacific War fought on the island of Okinawa by the United States Army and United States Marine Corps forces against the Imperial Japanese Army. The initial invasion of Okinawa on 1 April 1945 was the largest amphibious assault in the Pacific Theater of World War II. The Kerama Islands surrounding Okinawa were preemptively captured on 26 March 1945 by the U.S. Army 77th Infantry Division. The 82-day battle on Okinawa lasted from 1 April 1945 until 22 June 1945. After a long campaign of island hopping, the Allies were planning to use Kadena Air Base on the island as a staging point for Operation Downfall, the planned invasion of the Japanese home islands, 340 mi (550 km) away.

The United States created the Tenth Army, a cross-branch force consisting of the U.S. Army 7th, 27th, 77th and 96th Infantry Divisions with the 1st, 2nd, and 6th Marine Divisions, to secure the island. The Tenth Army was unique because it had its own Tactical Air Force (joint Army-Marine command) and was supported by combined naval and amphibious forces. Opposing the Allied forces on the ground was the Japanese Lieutenant General Mitsuru Ushijima's Thirty-Second Army, a mixed force consisting of regular army troops, naval infantry and conscripted local Okinawans. There were about 100,000 Japanese troops on Okinawa at the onset of the invasion. The battle was the longest sustained carrier campaign of the Second World War.

The battle has been referred to as the "typhoon of steel" (鉄の暴風, tetsu no bōfū). The nicknames refer to the ferocity of the fighting, the intensity of Japanese kamikaze attacks and the significant volume of Allied vessels and armored vehicles that assaulted the island. The battle was the bloodiest and fiercest in the Pacific Ocean Theatre, with some 50,000 Allied and around 100,000 Japanese casualties, also including local Okinawans conscripted into the Japanese Army. According to local authorities, at least 149,425 Okinawan people were killed, died by coerced suicide or went missing.

In the naval operations surrounding the battle, both sides lost a considerable number of ships and aircraft, including the Japanese battleship Yamato. After the battle, Okinawa provided the victorious Allies with a fleet anchorage, troop staging areas, and airfields in close proximity to Japan as they planned to invade the Japanese home islands.

== Order of battle ==
=== Allied ===
In all, the US Army had over 103,000 soldiers (of these, 38,000+ were non-divisional artillery, combat support and HQ troops, with another 9,000 service troops), over 88,000 Marines and 18,000 Navy personnel (mostly Seabees and medical personnel). At the start of the Battle of Okinawa, the US Tenth Army had 182,821 personnel under its command. It was planned that Lieutenant General Simon Bolivar Buckner Jr. would report to Vice Admiral Richmond K. Turner until the amphibious phase was completed, after which he would report directly to Admiral Raymond A. Spruance. Total aircraft provided by the US Navy, Marine and Army Air Force exceeded 3,000 over the course of the battle, including fighters, attack aircraft, scout planes, bombers and dive-bombers. The invasion was supported by a fleet consisting of 18 battleships, 27 cruisers, 177 destroyers/destroyer escorts, 39 aircraft carriers (11 fleet carriers, 6 light carriers and 22 escort carriers) and various support and troop transport ships.

The British naval contingent accompanied 251 British naval aircraft and included a British Commonwealth fleet with Australian, New Zealand and Canadian ships and personnel.

=== Japanese ===
The Japanese land campaign (mainly defensive) was conducted by the 67,000-strong (77,000 according to some sources) regular 32nd Army and some 9,000 Imperial Japanese Navy troops at Oroku Naval Base (only a few hundred of whom had been trained and equipped for ground combat), supported by 39,000 drafted local Ryukyuan people (including 24,000 hastily drafted rear militia called Boeitai and 15,000 non-uniformed laborers). The Japanese had used kamikaze tactics since the Battle of Leyte Gulf, but now for the first time they became a major institutionalized aspect of the Japanese defensive strategy. Between the American landing on 1 April and 25 May, seven major kamikaze attacks were attempted, involving more than 1,500 planes.

The 32nd Army initially consisted of the 9th, 24th and 62nd Divisions and the 44th Independent Mixed Brigade. The 9th Division was moved to Taiwan before the invasion, resulting in shuffling of Japanese defensive plans. Primary resistance was to be led in the south by Lieutenant General Mitsuru Ushijima, his chief of staff, Lieutenant General Isamu Chō and his chief of operations, Colonel Hiromichi Yahara. Yahara advocated a defensive strategy, whilst Chō advocated an offensive one.

In the north, Colonel Takehiko Udo was in command. The naval troops were led by Rear Admiral Minoru Ōta. They expected the Americans to land 6–10 divisions against the Japanese garrison of two and a half divisions. The staff calculated that superior quality and numbers of weapons gave each US division five or six times the firepower of a Japanese division. To this, would be added the Americans' abundant naval and air firepower.

==== Japanese use of children ====
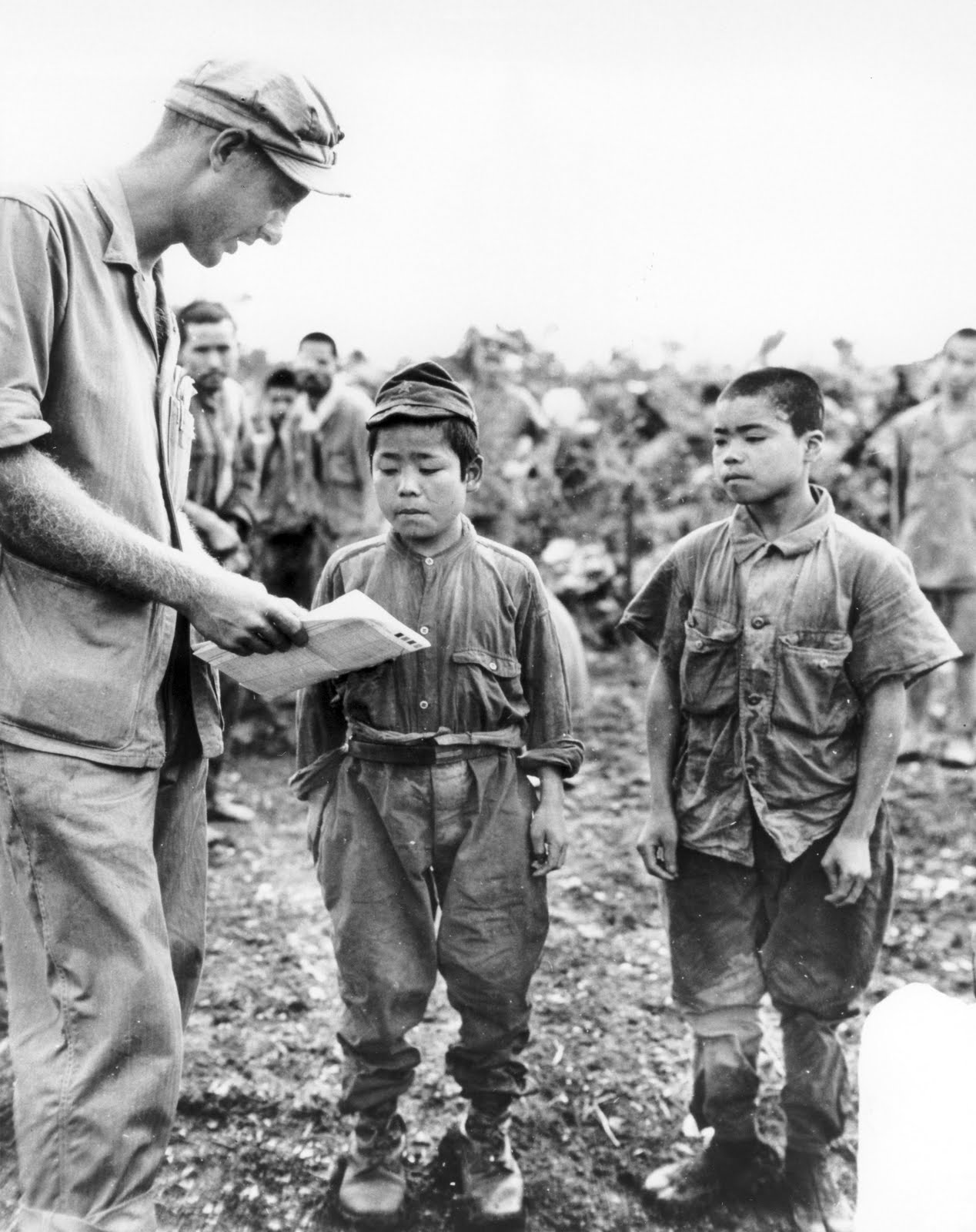
Tekketsu Kinnōtai child soldiers on Okinawa

On Okinawa, the Imperial Japanese Army mobilized 1,780 schoolboys aged 14–17 years into front line service as an Iron and Blood Imperial Corps (Japanese: 鉄血勤皇隊, romanized: Tekketsu Kinnōtai), while female Himeyuri students were organized into a nursing unit. This mobilization was conducted by an ordinance of the Ministry of the Army, not by law. The ordinances mobilized the students as volunteer soldiers for form's sake; in reality, the military authorities ordered schools to force almost all students to "volunteer" as soldiers; sometimes they counterfeited the necessary documents. About half of the Tekketsu Kinnōtai were killed, including in suicide bomb attacks against tanks and in guerrilla operations.

Among the 21 male and female secondary schools that made up these student corps, 2,000 students died on the battlefield. Even with the female students acting mainly as nurses to Japanese soldiers, they were still exposed to the harsh conditions of war.

== Naval battle ==
There was a hypnotic fascination to the sight so alien to our Western philosophy. We watched each plunging kamikaze with the detached horror of one witnessing a terrible spectacle rather than as the intended victim. We forgot self for the moment as we groped hopelessly for the thought of that other man up there.

— Vice Admiral C.R. Brown, US Navy

The US Navy's Task Force 58, deployed to the east of Okinawa with a picket group of 6 to 8 destroyers, kept 13 carriers (7 fleet carriers and 6 light carriers) on duty from 23 March to 27 April and a smaller number thereafter. Until 27 April, a minimum of 14 and up to 18 escort carriers were in the area at all times. Until 20 April, British Task Force 57, with 4 large and 6 escort carriers, remained off the Sakishima Islands to protect the southern flank.

The protracted length of the campaign under stressful conditions forced Admiral Chester W. Nimitz to take the unprecedented step of relieving the principal naval commanders to rest and recuperate. Following the practice of changing the fleet designation with the change of commanders, US naval forces began the campaign as the US 5th Fleet under Admiral Spruance, but ended it as the 3rd Fleet under Admiral Halsey.

Japanese air opposition had been relatively light during the first few days after the landings. However, on 6 April the expected air reaction began with an attack by some 400 Japanese planes from Kyushu.

Similar air attacks continued through April. From 26 March to 30 April, 20 American ships were sunk and 157 damaged by enemy action. By 30 April, the Japanese had lost more than 1,100 planes to Allied naval forces alone.

Between 6 April and 22 June, the Japanese flew 1,465 kamikaze aircraft in large-scale attacks from Kyushu, 185 individual kamikaze sorties from Kyushu, and 250 individual kamikaze sorties from Taiwan, then called Formosa. While US intelligence estimated there were 89 planes on Formosa, the Japanese actually had about 700, dismantled or well camouflaged and dispersed into scattered villages and towns; the US Fifth Air Force disputed Navy claims of kamikaze coming from Formosa.

The ships lost were smaller vessels, particularly the destroyers of the radar pickets, as well as destroyer escorts and landing ships. While no major Allied warship was lost, several fleet carriers were severely damaged. Land-based Shin'yō-class suicide motorboats were also used in the Japanese suicide attacks, although Ushijima had disbanded the majority of the suicide boat battalions before the battle because of expected low effectiveness against a superior enemy. The boat crews were re-formed into three additional infantry battalions.

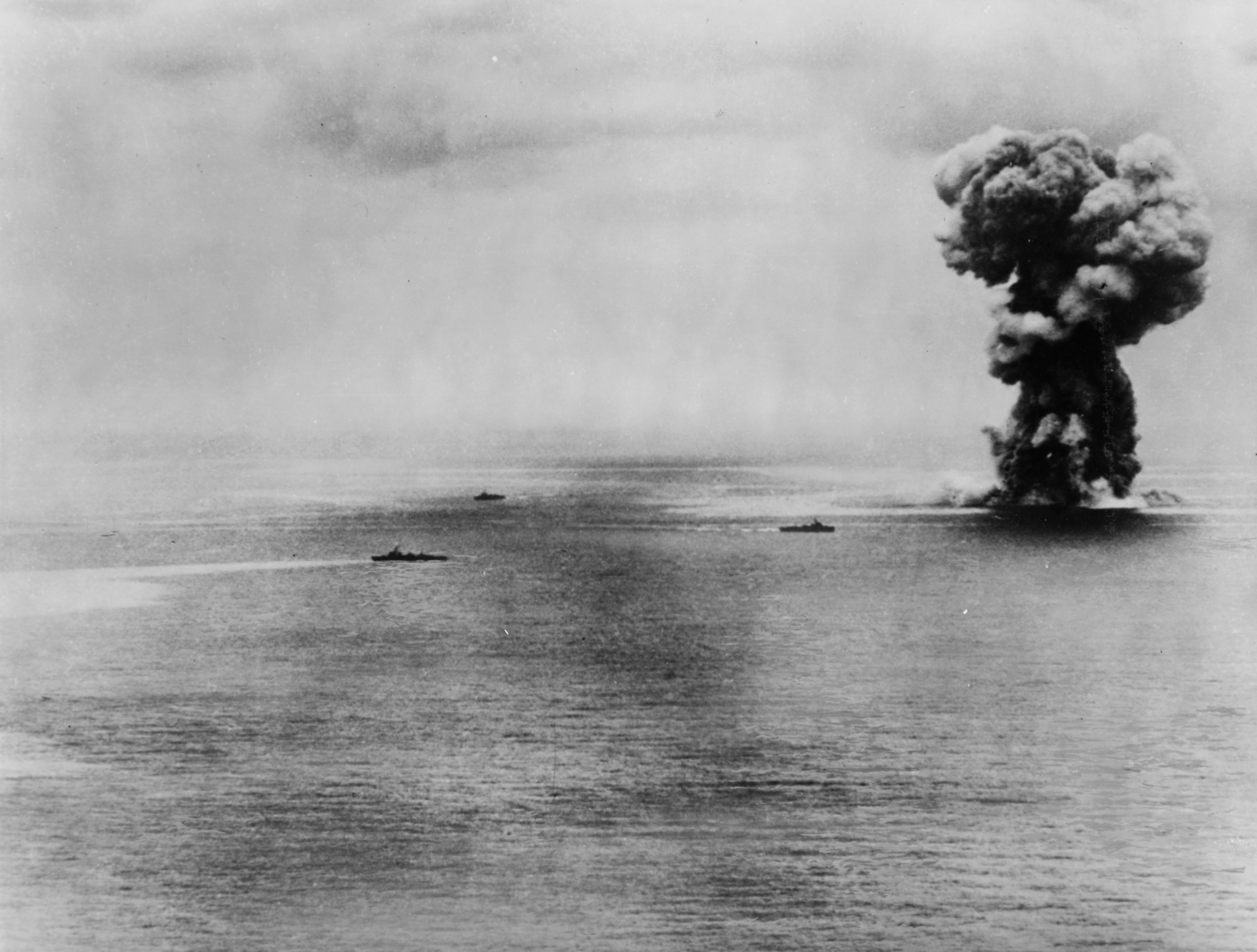
The battleship Yamato explodes after persistent attacks from US aircraft.

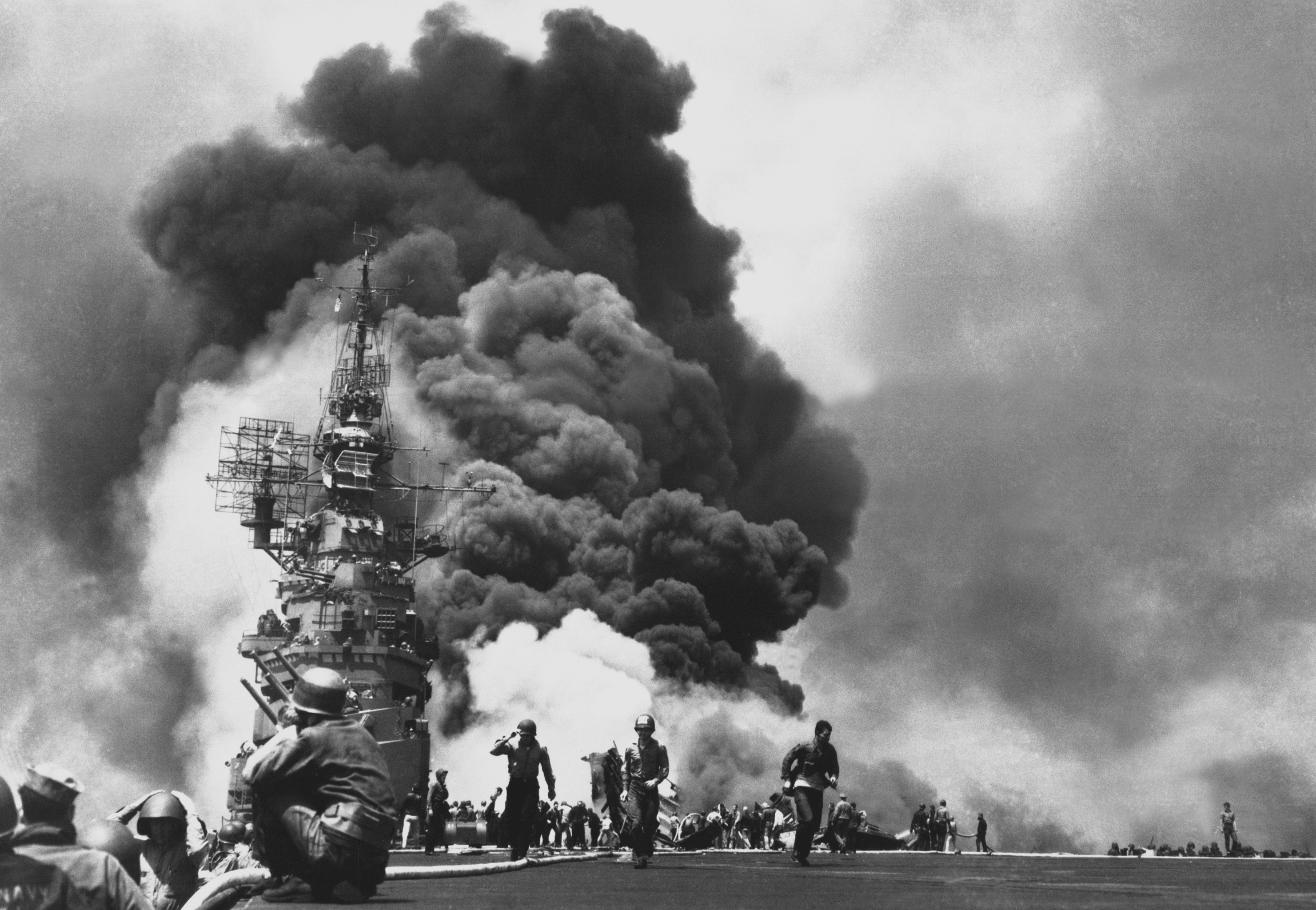
American aircraft carrier USS Bunker Hill burns after being hit by two kamikaze planes within 30 seconds.

=== Operation Ten-Go ===
Operation Kikusui I (菊水作戦, Kikusui Sakusen 1; Operation Chrysanthemum Water 1), best known as Operation Ten-Go (天号作戦, Ten-Gō Sakusen), literally Operation Heaven and in Japanese sources as the Battle off Cape Bono (坊ノ岬沖海戦, Bōno Misaki Oki-Kaisen) was the last major Japanese naval operation in the Pacific Theater of World War II. In April 1945, the Japanese battleship Yamato, the largest battleship in the world, and nine other Japanese warships, embarked from Japan for a suicide attack on Allied forces engaged in the Battle of Okinawa. The Japanese force was attacked by U.S. carrier-borne aircraft before it could reach Okinawa; Yamato and five other Japanese warships were sunk, while 10 American aircraft were shot down. Several ships in the U.S. carrier task force suffered moderate damage from aerial kamikaze attacks, while 100 Japanese planes were lost. Operation Kikusui I, best known as Operation Ten-Go, refers specifically to Yamato's sortie, while Operation Kikusui refers specifically to all Japanese kamikaze operations during the entire Okinawa campaign.

=== British Pacific Fleet ===
The British Pacific Fleet, taking part as Task Force 57, was assigned the task of neutralizing the Japanese airfields in the Sakishima Islands, which it did successfully from 26 March to 10 April. On 10 April its attention was shifted to airfields in northern Formosa. The force withdrew to San Pedro Bay on 23 April. On 1 May, the British Pacific Fleet returned to action, subduing the airfields as before, this time with naval bombardment as well as aircraft (they only used aircraft during their first mission of destroying airfields in the Sakishima Islands). Several kamikaze attacks caused significant damage, but as the Royal Navy carriers had armored flight decks, they experienced only a brief interruption to their force's operations.

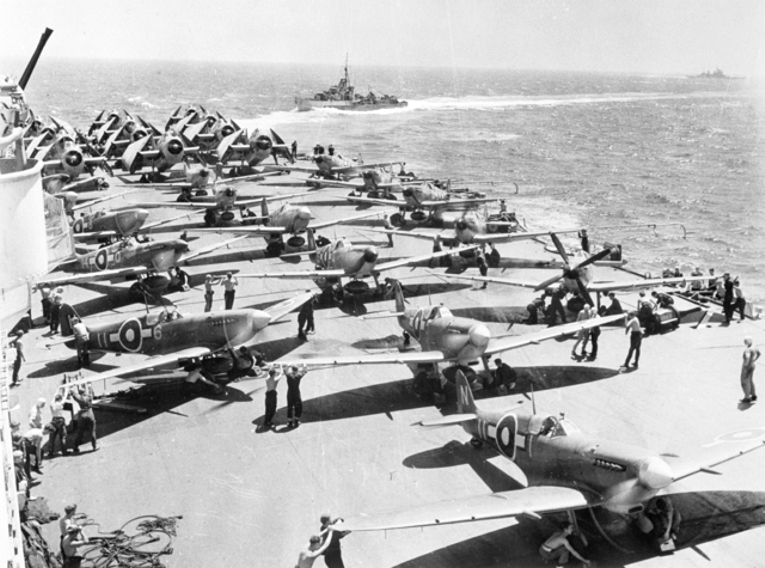
Royal Navy Fleet Air Arm Avengers, Seafires and Fireflies on HMS Implacable warm up their engines before taking off.

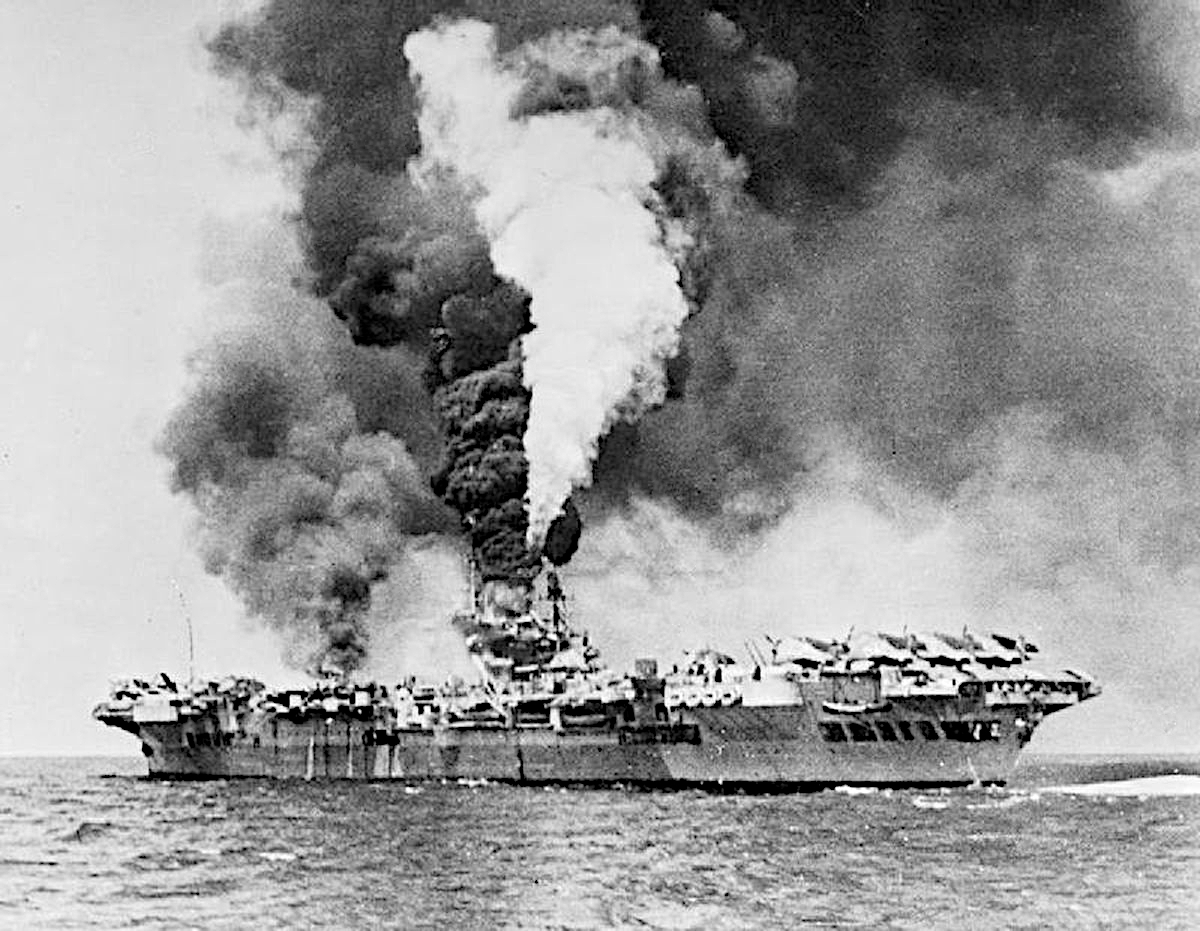
HMS Formidable on fire after a kamikaze attack on May 4. The ship was out of action for fifty minutes.

== Land battle ==
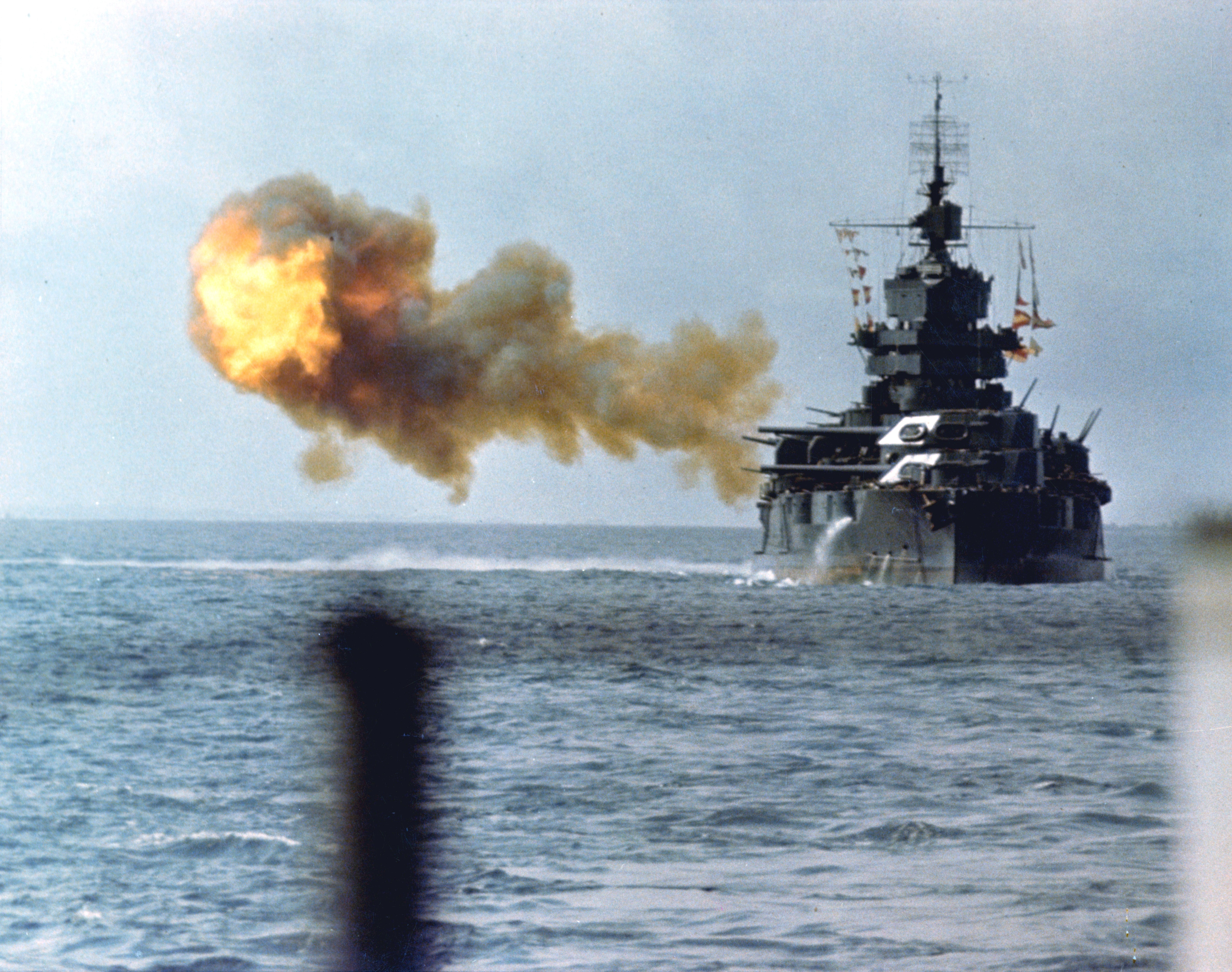
The battleship USS Idaho shelling Okinawa on 1 April 1945

The land battle took place over about 81 days beginning on 1 April 1945. The first Americans ashore were soldiers of the 77th Infantry Division who landed in the Kerama Islands, 15 mi (24 km) west of Okinawa on 26 March. Subsidiary landings followed, and the Kerama group was secured over the next five days. In these preliminary operations, the 77th Infantry Division suffered 27 dead and 81 wounded, while the Japanese dead and captured numbered over 650. On 28 March 1945, 394 civilians on Tokashiki island were forced by Japanese soldiers to kill themselves after the landing of US troops. The operation provided a protected anchorage for the fleet and eliminated the threat from suicide boats.

On 31 March, Marines of the Amphibious Reconnaissance Battalion landed without opposition on Keise Shima, four islets just 8 mi (13 km) west of the Okinawan capital of Naha. A group of 155 mm (6.1 in) "Long Tom" artillery pieces went ashore on the islets to cover operations on Okinawa.

=== Northern Okinawa ===
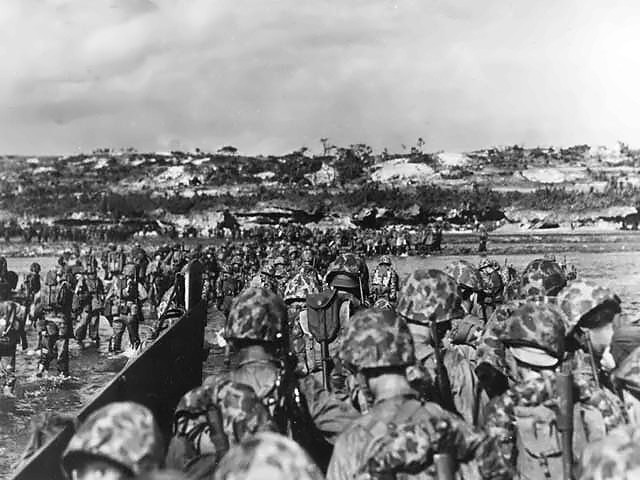
US Marine reinforcements wade ashore to support the beachhead on Okinawa, 1 April 1945.

The main landing was made by the XXIV Corps and the III Amphibious Corps on the Hagushi beaches on the western coast of Okinawa on 1 April. The 2nd Marine Division conducted a demonstration off the Minatoga beaches on the southeastern coast to deceive the Japanese about American intentions and delay movement of reserves from there.

Tenth Army swept across the south-central part of the island with relative ease, capturing the Kadena and the Yomitan airbases within hours of the landing. In light of the weak opposition, General Buckner decided to proceed immediately with Phase II of his plan, the seizure of northern Okinawa. The 6th Marine Division headed up the Ishikawa Isthmus and by 7 April had sealed off the Motobu Peninsula.

Six days later on 13 April, the 2nd Battalion, 22nd Marine Regiment, reached Hedo Point at the northernmost tip of the island. By this point, the bulk of the Japanese forces in the north (codenamed Udo Force) were cornered on the Motobu Peninsula. The terrain was mountainous and wooded, with the Japanese defenses concentrated on Mount Yaedake, a twisted mass of rocky ridges and ravines on the center of the peninsula. There was heavy fighting before the Marines finally cleared Yaedake on 18 April. However, this was not the end of ground combat in northern Okinawa. On 24 May, the Japanese mounted Operation Gi-gou: a company of Giretsu Kuteitai commandos were airlifted in a suicide attack on Yomitan. They destroyed 70,000 US gallons (260,000 L) of fuel and nine planes before being killed by the defenders, who lost two men.

Meanwhile, the 77th Infantry Division assaulted Ie Shima, a small island off the western end of the peninsula, on 16 April. In addition to conventional hazards, the 77th Infantry Division encountered kamikaze attacks and even local women armed with spears. There was heavy fighting before the area was declared secured on 21 April and became another airbase for operations against Japan.

=== Southern Okinawa ===
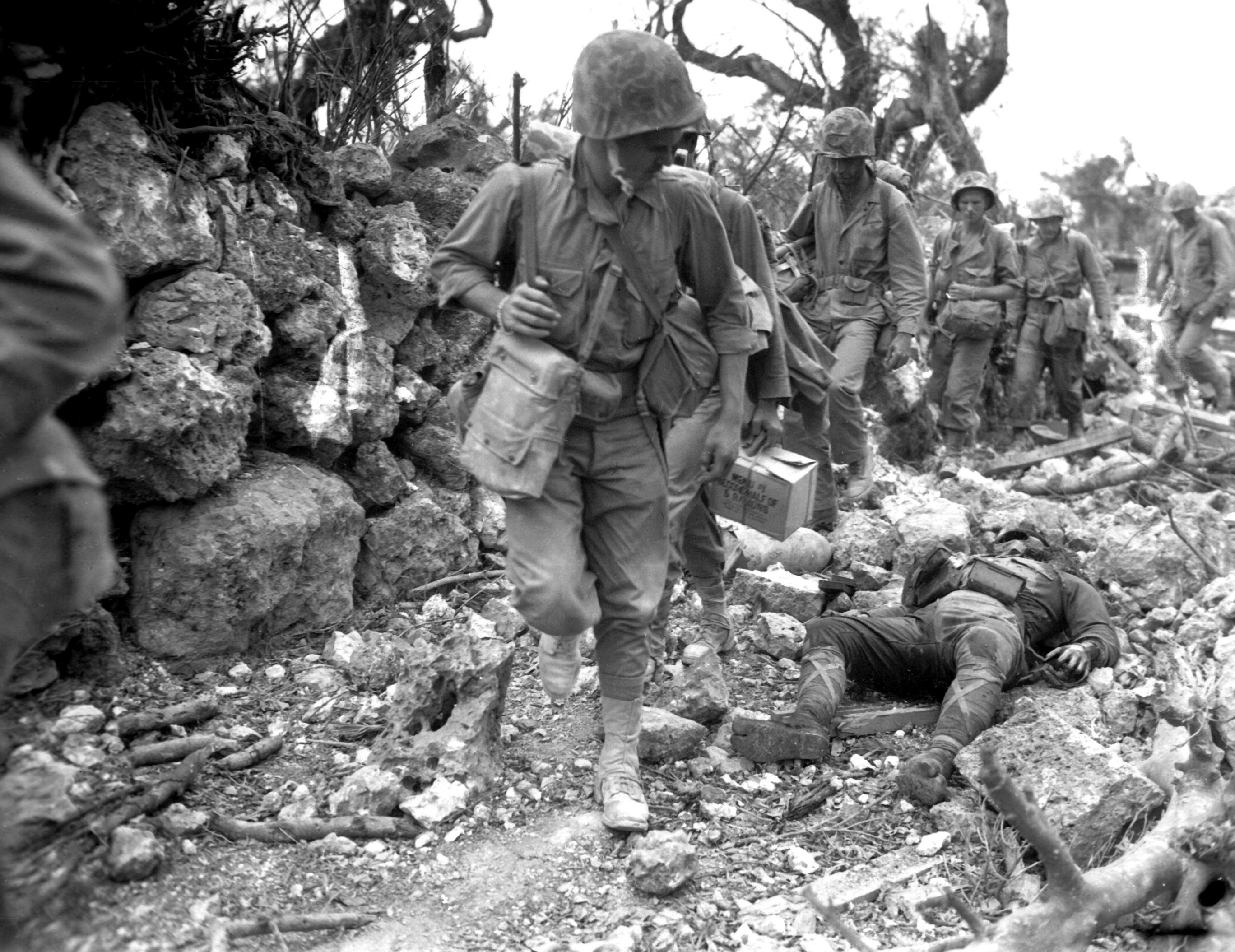
US Marines pass a dead Japanese soldier in a destroyed village, April 1945.

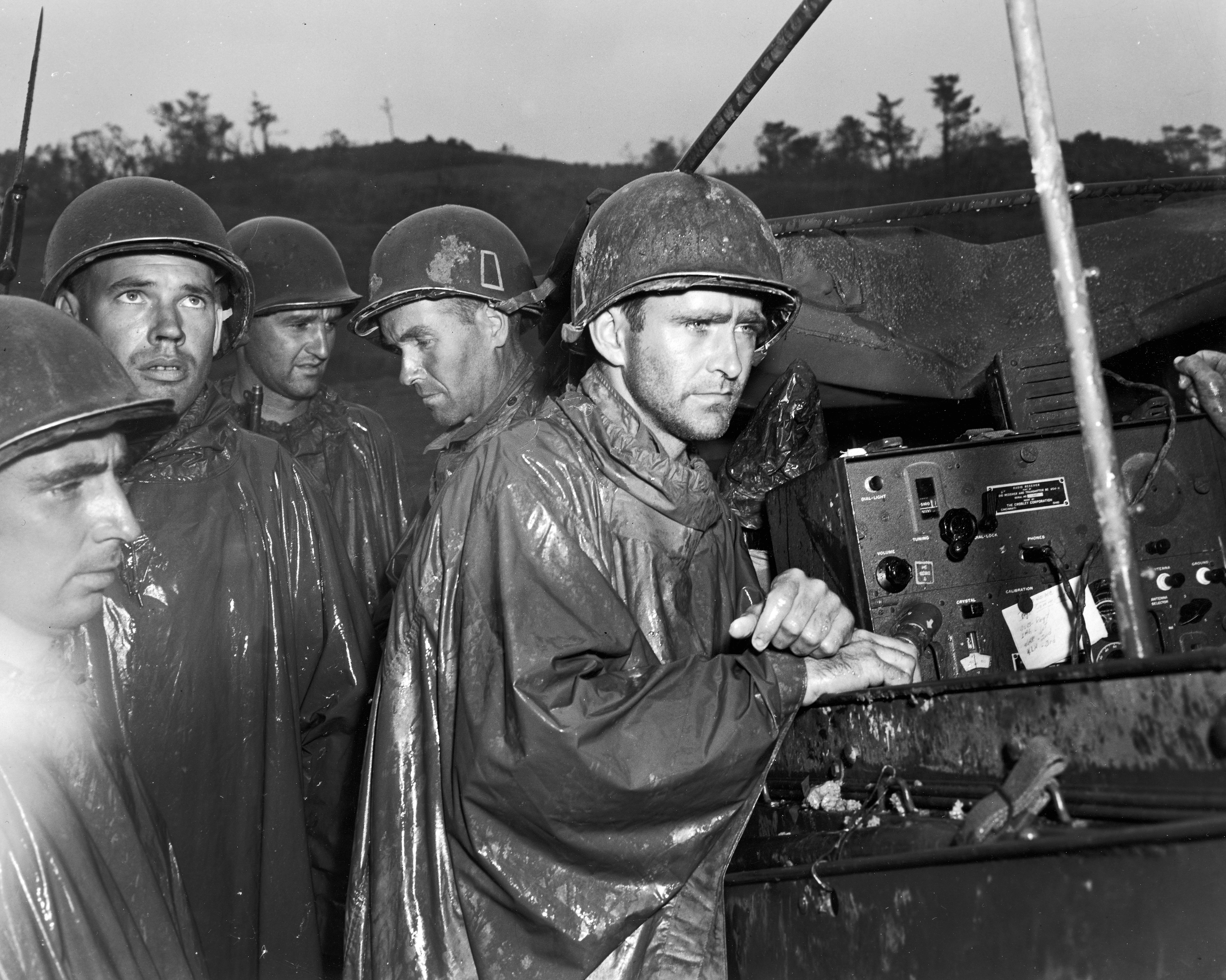
American soldiers of the 77th Infantry Division listen impassively to radio reports of Victory in Europe Day on 8 May 1945.

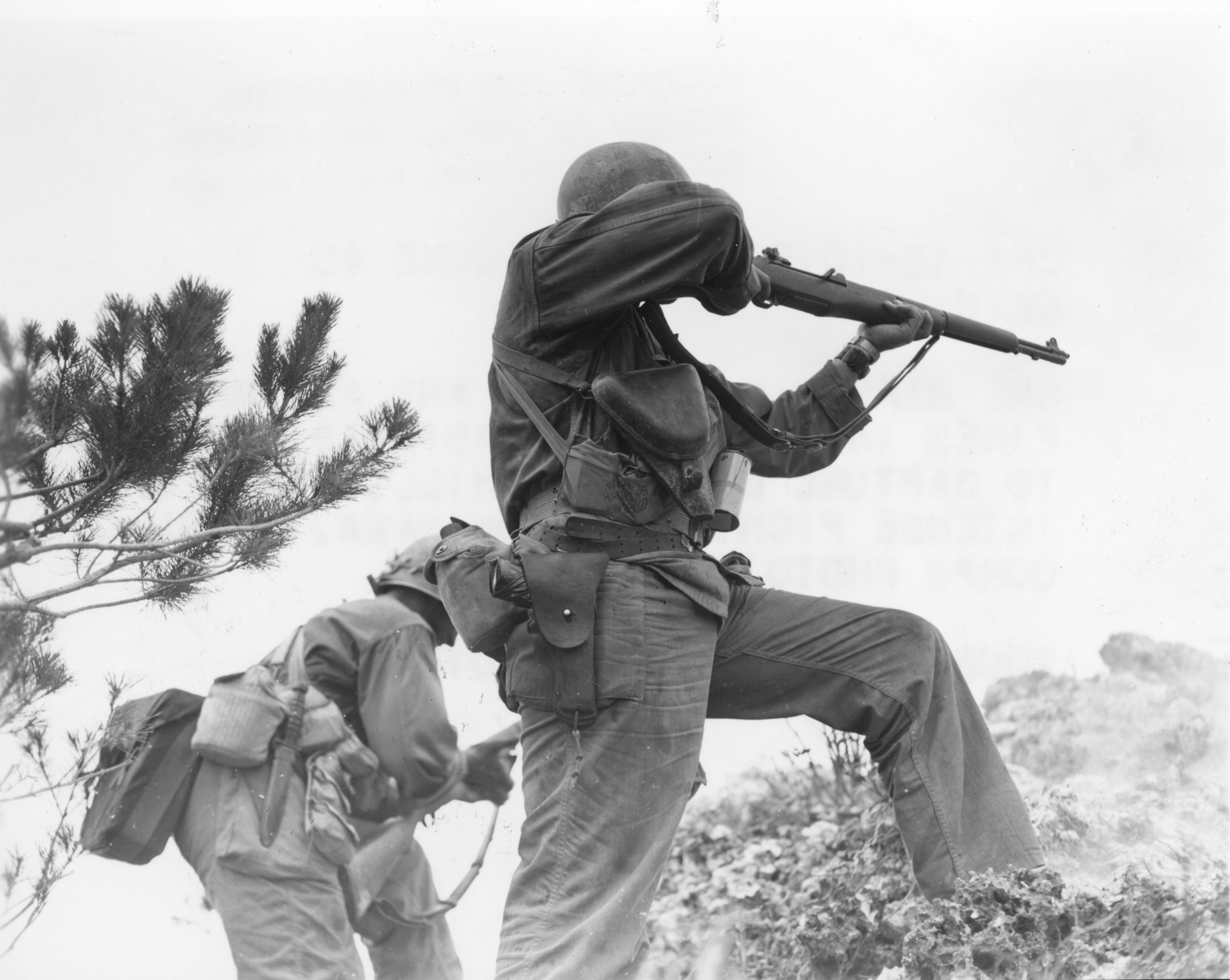
Soldiers of the 96th Infantry Division attack Japanese positions on Big Apple Ridge.

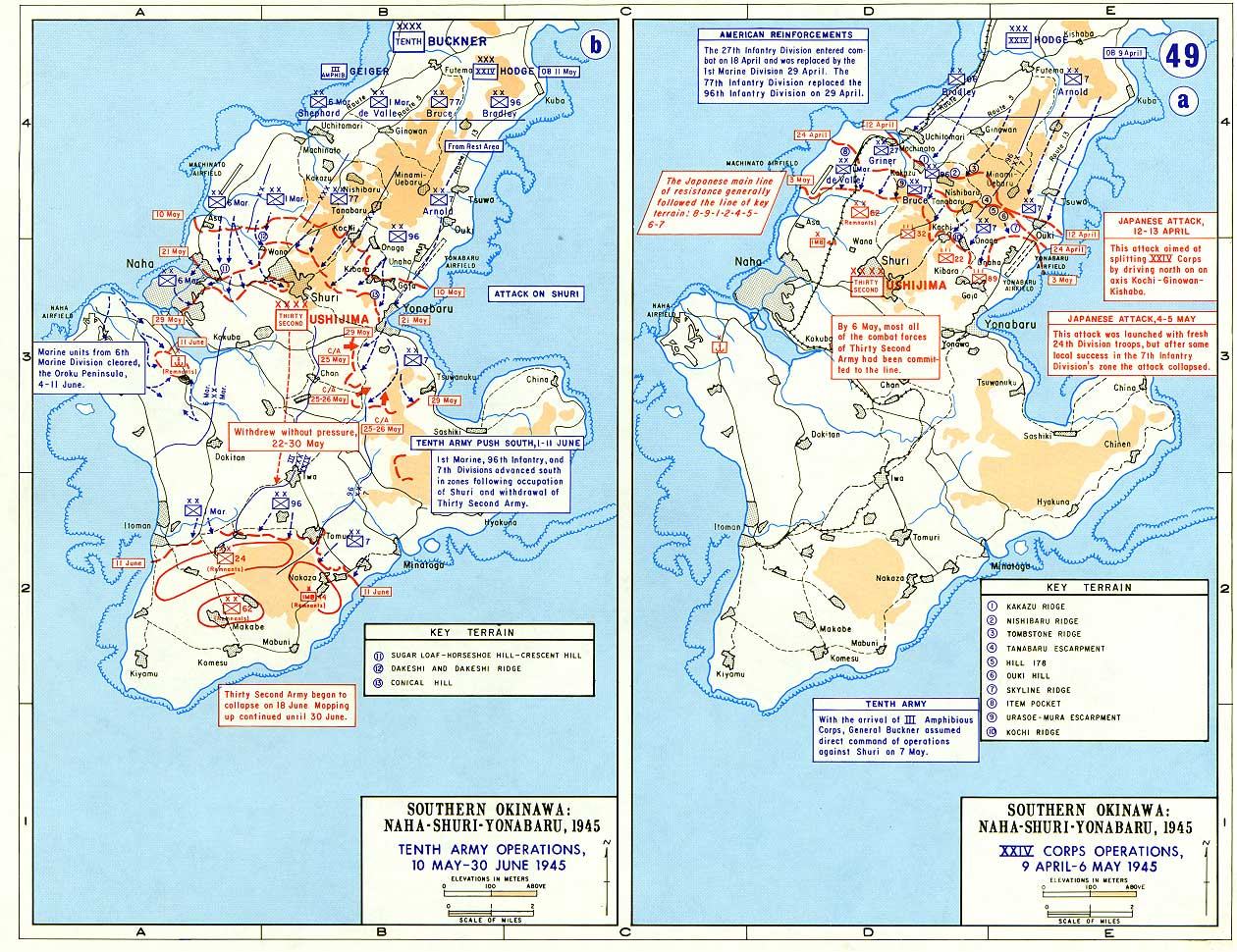
US Operations in Southern Okinawa

While the 6th Marine Division cleared northern Okinawa, the US Army 96th and 7th Infantry Divisions wheeled south across the narrow isthmus of Okinawa. The 96th Infantry Division began to encounter fierce resistance in west-central Okinawa from Japanese troops holding fortified positions east of Highway No. 1 and about 5 mi (8 km) northwest of Shuri, from what came to be known as Cactus Ridge. The 7th Infantry Division encountered similarly fierce Japanese opposition from a rocky pinnacle located about 1,000 yd (910 m) southwest of Arakachi (later dubbed "The Pinnacle"). By the night of 8 April, American troops had cleared these and several other strongly fortified positions. They suffered over 1,500 battle casualties in the process while killing or capturing about 4,500 Japanese. Yet the battle had only begun, for it was realized that "these were merely outposts," guarding the Shuri Line.

The next American objective was Kakazu Ridge (26.259°N 127.737°E)(see ja:嘉数の戦い), two hills with a connecting saddle that formed part of Shuri's outer defenses. The Japanese had prepared their positions well and fought tenaciously. The Japanese soldiers hid in fortified caves. American forces often lost personnel before clearing the Japanese out from each cave or other hiding place. The Japanese sent out Okinawans at gunpoint to obtain water and supplies for them, which led to civilian casualties. The American advance was inexorable but resulted in a high number of casualties on both sides. Meanwhile, American forces also faced heavy resistance at the Maeda Ridge, also known as Hacksaw Ridge (see ja:前田の戦い).

As the American assault against Kakazu Ridge stalled, Lieutenant General Ushijima—influenced by General Chō—decided to take the offensive. On the evening of 12 April, the 32nd Army attacked American positions across the entire front. The Japanese attack was heavy, sustained, and well organized. After fierce close combat, the attackers retreated, only to repeat their offensive the following night. A final assault on 14 April was again repulsed. The effort led the 32nd Army's staff to conclude that the Americans were vulnerable to night infiltration tactics but that their superior firepower made any offensive Japanese troop concentrations extremely dangerous, and they reverted to their defensive strategy.

The 27th Infantry Division, which had landed on 9 April, took over on the right, along the west coast of Okinawa. General John R. Hodge now had three divisions in the line, with the 96th in the middle and the 7th to the east, with each division holding a front of only about 1.5 mi (2.4 km). Hodge launched a new offensive on 19 April with a barrage of 324 guns, the largest ever in the Pacific Ocean Theater. Battleships, cruisers, and destroyers joined the bombardment, which was followed by 650 Navy and Marine planes attacking the Japanese positions with napalm, rockets, bombs, and machine guns. The Japanese defenses were sited on reverse slopes, where the defenders waited out the artillery barrage and aerial attack in relative safety, emerging from the caves to rain mortar rounds and grenades upon the Americans advancing up the forward slope.

A tank assault to achieve breakthrough by outflanking Kakazu Ridge failed to link up with its infantry support attempting to cross the ridge and therefore failed with the loss of 22 tanks. Although flame tanks cleared many cave defenses, there was no breakthrough, and the XXIV Corps suffered 720 casualties. The losses might have been greater except for the fact that the Japanese had practically all of their infantry reserves tied up farther south, held there by another feint off the Minatoga beaches by the 2nd Marine Division that coincided with the attack.

At the end of April, after Army forces had pushed through the Machinato defensive line, the 1st Marine Division relieved the 27th Infantry Division and the 77th Infantry Division relieved the 96th. When the 6th Marine Division arrived, the III Amphibious Corps took over the right flank and Tenth Army assumed control of the battle.

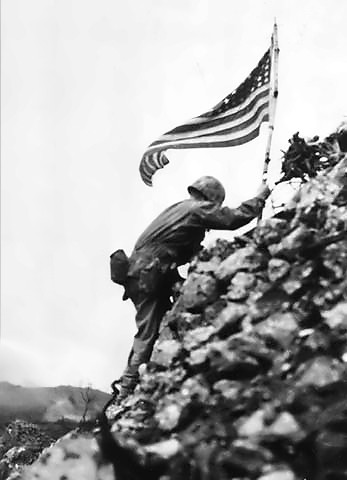
Lt. Col. Richard P. Ross Jr., commander of 3rd Battalion, 1st Marines braves sniper fire to place the United States' colors over the parapets of Shuri Castle on 30 May. This flag was first raised over Cape Gloucester and then Peleliu.

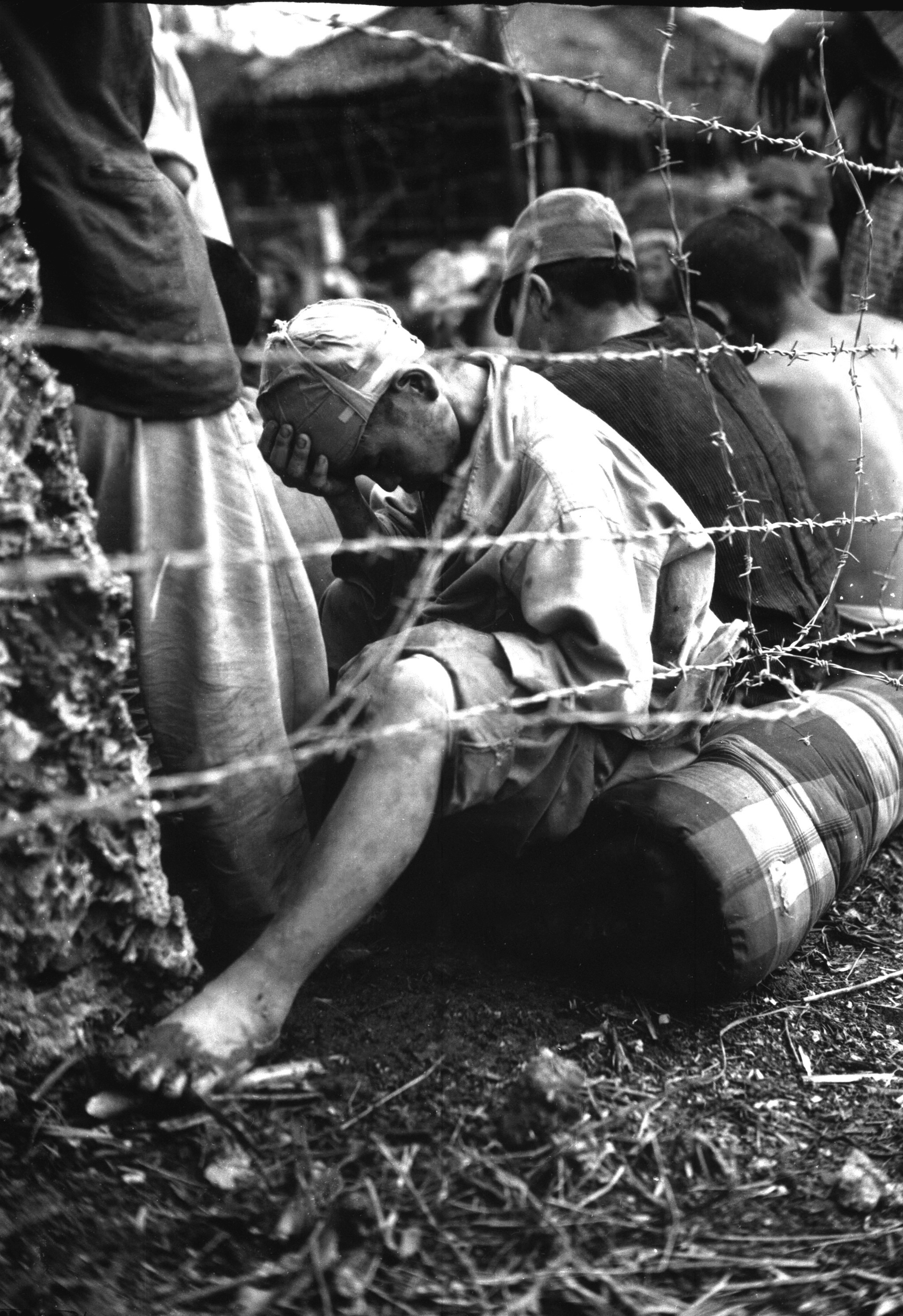
A Japanese prisoner of war sits behind barbed wire after he and 306 others were captured within the last 24 hours of the battle by 6th Marine Division.

On 4 May, the 32nd Army launched another counter-offensive. This time, Ushijima attempted to make amphibious assaults on the coasts behind American lines. To support his offensive, the Japanese artillery moved into the open. By doing so, they were able to fire 13,000 rounds in support, but effective American counter-battery fire destroyed dozens of Japanese artillery pieces. The attack failed.

Buckner launched another American attack on 11 May. Ten days of fierce fighting followed. On 13 May, troops of the 96th Infantry Division and 763rd Tank Battalion captured Conical Hill (26.21°N 127.75°E). Rising 476 ft (145 m) above the Yonabaru coastal plain, this feature was the eastern anchor of the main Japanese defenses and was defended by about 1,000 Japanese. Meanwhile, on the opposite coast, the 1st and 6th Marine Divisions fought for "Sugar Loaf Hill" (26.222°N 127.696°E). The capture of these two key positions exposed the Japanese around Shuri on both sides. Buckner hoped to envelop Shuri and trap the main Japanese defending force.

By the end of May, monsoon rains which had turned contested hills and roads into a morass exacerbated both the tactical and medical situations. The ground advance began to resemble a World War I battlefield, as troops became mired in mud, and flooded roads greatly inhibited evacuation of wounded to the rear. Troops lived on a field sodden by rain, part garbage dump and part graveyard. Unburied Japanese and American bodies decayed, sank in the mud and became part of a noxious stew. Anyone sliding down the greasy slopes could easily find their pockets full of maggots at the end of the journey.

From 24 to 27 May the 6th Marine Division cautiously occupied the ruins of Naha, the largest city on the island, finding it largely deserted.

On 26 May aerial observers saw large troop movements just below Shuri. On 28 May Marine patrols found recently abandoned positions west of Shuri. By 30 May the consensus among Army and Marine intelligence was that the majority of Japanese forces had withdrawn from the Shuri Line. On 29 May the 1st Battalion, 5th Marines (1/5 Marines) occupied high ground 700 yards (640 m) east of Shuri Castle and reported that the castle appeared undefended. At 10:15 Company A, 1/5 Marines occupied the castle.

Shuri Castle had been shelled by the battleship USS Mississippi for three days before this advance. The 32nd Army withdrew to the south and thus the Marines had an easy task of securing Shuri Castle. The castle, however, was outside the 1st Marine Division's assigned zone, and only frantic efforts by the commander and staff of the 77th Infantry Division prevented an American airstrike and artillery bombardment which would have resulted in many friendly fire casualties.

On 29 May a Confederate flag was raised over Shuri Castle, before being removed and replaced by a US flag three days later on orders of General Buckner, himself the son of a Confederate General.

The Japanese retreat, although harassed by artillery fire, was conducted with great skill at night and aided by the monsoon storms. The 32nd Army was able to move nearly 30,000 personnel into its last defense line on the Kiyan Peninsula, which ultimately led to the greatest slaughter on Okinawa in the latter stages of the battle, including the deaths of thousands of civilians. In addition, there were 9,000 IJN troops supported by 1,100 militia, with approximately 4,000 holed up at the underground headquarters on the hillside overlooking the Okinawa Naval Base in the Oroku Peninsula, east of the airfield.

On 4 June, elements of the 6th Marine Division launched an amphibious assault on the peninsula. The 4,000 Japanese sailors, including Admiral Ōta, all committed suicide within the hand-built tunnels of the underground naval headquarters on 13 June. By 17 June, the remnants of Ushijima's shattered 32nd Army were pushed into a small pocket in the far south of the island to the southeast of Itoman.

On 18 June, General Buckner was killed by Japanese artillery fire while monitoring the progress of his troops from a forward observation post. Buckner was replaced by Major General Roy Geiger. Upon assuming command, Geiger became the only US Marine to command a numbered army of the US Army in combat; he was relieved five days later by General Joseph Stilwell. On 19 June, Brigadier General Claudius Miller Easley, the commander of the 96th Infantry Division, was killed by Japanese machine-gun fire, also while checking on the progress of his troops at the front.

The last remnants of Japanese resistance ended on 21 June, although some Japanese continued hiding, including the future governor of Okinawa Prefecture, Masahide Ōta. Ushijima and Chō committed suicide by seppuku in their command headquarters on Hill 89 in the closing hours of the battle. Colonel Yahara had asked Ushijima for permission to commit suicide, but the general refused his request, saying: "If you die there will be no one left who knows the truth about the battle of Okinawa. Bear the temporary shame but endure it. This is an order from your army commander." Following his capture by American soldiers in July 1945 after going into hiding as a civilian, Yahara was the most senior officer to have survived the battle on the island, and he later authored a book titled The Battle for Okinawa. On 22 June, the Tenth Army held a flag-raising ceremony to mark the end of organized resistance on Okinawa. On 23 June a mopping-up operation commenced, which concluded on 30 June.

On 15 August 1945, Admiral Matome Ugaki was killed while part of a kamikaze raid on Iheyajima island. The official surrender ceremony was held on 7 September, near the Kadena Airfield.

== Casualties ==
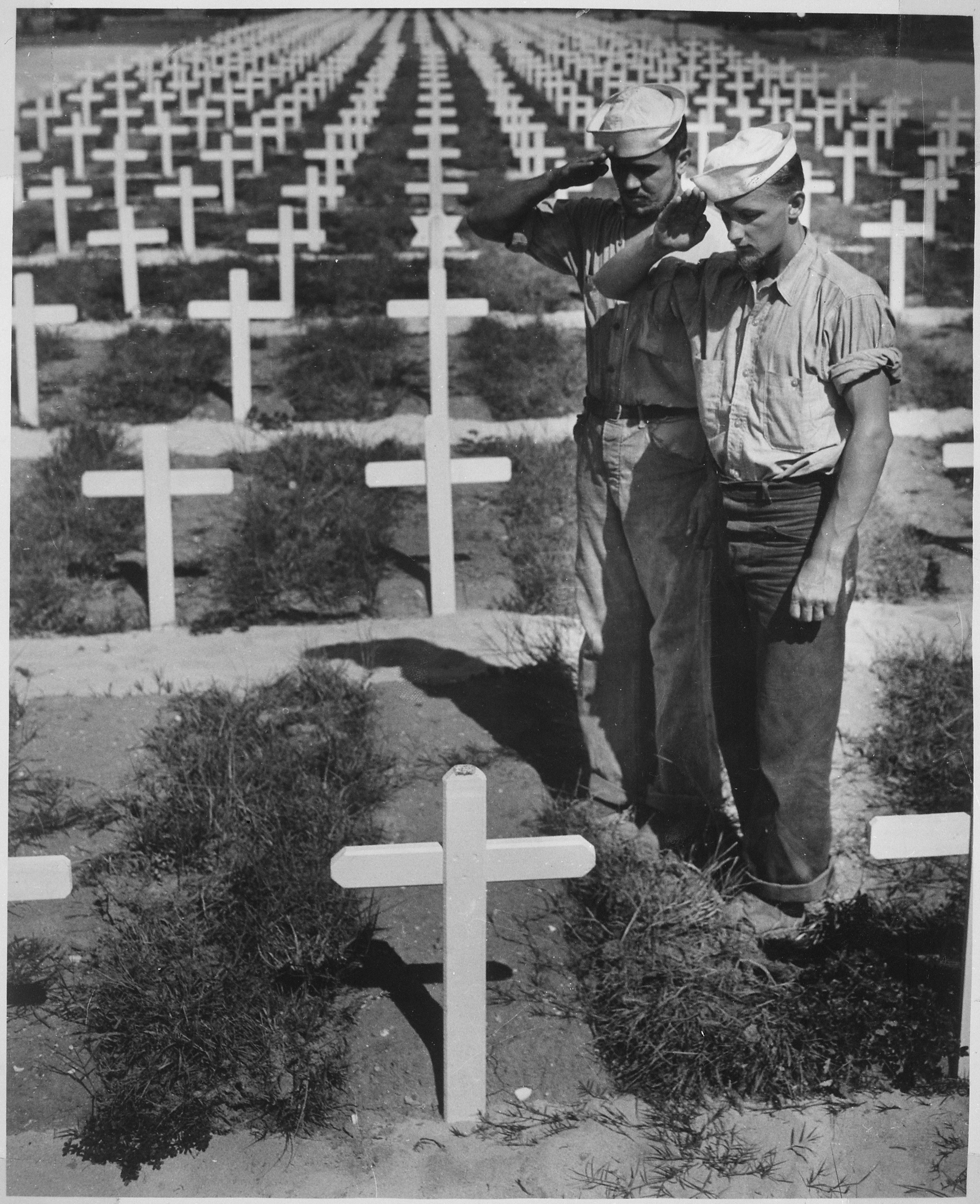
Two US Coast Guardsmen pay homage to their comrade killed in the Ryukyu Islands.

The Battle of Okinawa was the bloodiest battle of the Pacific War. The most complete tally of deaths during the battle is at the Cornerstone of Peace monument at the Okinawa Prefectural Peace Memorial Museum, which identifies the names of each individual who died at Okinawa in World War II. As of 2023, the monument lists 242,046 names, including 149,634 Okinawans, 77,823 Imperial Japanese soldiers, 14,010 Americans, and smaller numbers of people from South Korea (381), the United Kingdom (82), North Korea (82) and Taiwan (34).

The numbers correspond to recorded deaths during the Battle of Okinawa from the time of the American landings in the Kerama Islands on 26 March 1945 to the signing of the Japanese surrender on 2 September 1945, in addition to all Okinawan casualties in the Pacific War in the 15 years from the Manchurian Incident, along with those who died in Okinawa from war-related events in the year before the battle and the year after the surrender. 234,183 names were inscribed by the time of unveiling, and new names are added as necessary. 40,000 of the Okinawan civilians killed had been drafted or impressed by the Japanese army and are often counted as combat deaths.

=== Military losses ===
==== American ====
Two wounded American soldiers make their way to a medical aid station on Okinawa, 20 April 1945.

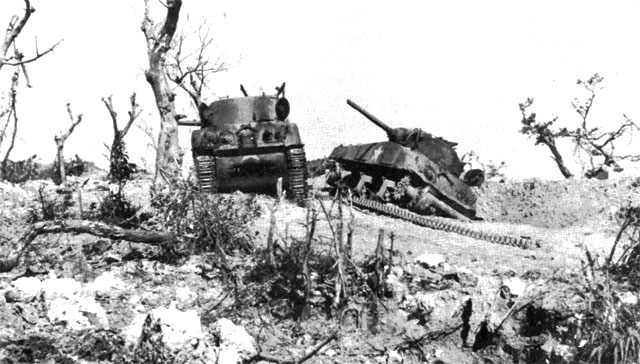
Two US M4 Sherman tanks knocked out by Japanese artillery at Bloody Ridge, 20 April 1945

The Americans suffered some 48,000 casualties, not including some 33,000 non-battle casualties (psychiatric, injuries, illnesses), of whom over 12,000 were killed or missing. Killed in action were 4,907 Navy, 4,675 Army, and 2,938 Marine Corps personnel; while 13,708 marines were wounded. When excluding naval losses at sea and losses on the surrounding islands (such as Ie Shima), 6,316 killed and over 30,000 wounded occurred on Okinawa proper. Other authors such as John Keegan have come up with higher numbers. The battle caused more than twice the number of American casualties than both the Guadalcanal Campaign and Battle of Iwo Jima combined, with the Japanese kamikaze effort causing the American Navy to suffer more casualties than any previous engagement in the Atlantic or Pacific.

The most famous American casualty was Lieutenant General Buckner, whose decision to attack the Japanese defenses head-on, although extremely costly in American lives, was ultimately successful. Four days from the closing of the campaign, Buckner was killed by Japanese artillery fire, which blew lethal slivers of coral into his body, while inspecting his troops at the front line. He was the highest-ranking US officer to be killed by enemy fire during the Second World War. The day after Buckner was killed, Brigadier General Easley was killed by Japanese machine-gun fire. War correspondent Ernie Pyle was also killed by Japanese machine-gun fire on Ie Shima, a small island just off of northwestern Okinawa.

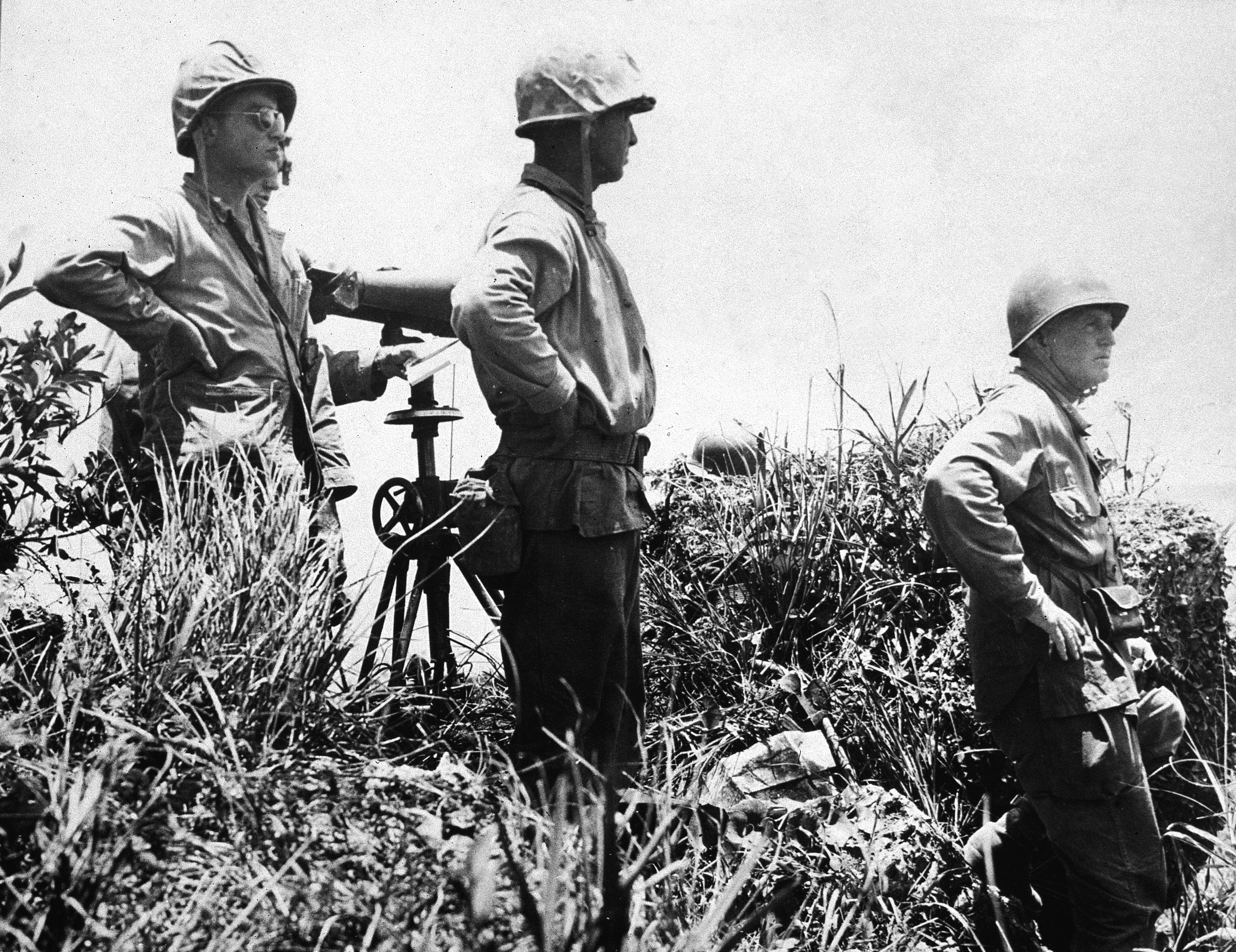
The last picture of US Army Lt. Gen. Simon Bolivar Buckner, Jr. (right), taken on 18 June 1945. Later in the day, he was killed by Japanese artillery fire.

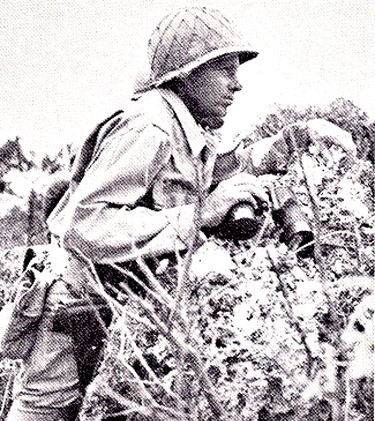
The last picture of US Army Brig. Gen. Claudius Miller Easley, taken on 19 June 1945. He was later killed by Japanese machine-gun fire.

Aircraft losses over the three-month period were 768 US planes, including those bombing the Kyushu airfields launching kamikazes. Combat losses were 458, and the other 310 were operational accidents. At sea, 368 Allied ships—including 120 amphibious craft—were damaged while another 36—including 15 amphibious ships and 12 destroyers—were sunk during the Okinawa campaign. The US Navy's dead exceeded its wounded, with 4,907 killed and 4,874 wounded, primarily from kamikaze attacks.

American personnel casualties included thousands of cases of mental breakdown. According to the account of the battle presented in Marine Corps Gazette:

More mental health issues arose from the Battle of Okinawa than any other battle in the Pacific during World War II. The constant bombardment from artillery and mortars coupled with the high casualty rates led to a great deal of personnel coming down with combat fatigue. Additionally, the rains caused mud that prevented tanks from moving and tracks from pulling out the dead, forcing Marines (who pride themselves on burying their dead in a proper and honorable manner) to leave their comrades where they lay. This, coupled with thousands of bodies both friend and foe littering the entire island, created a scent you could nearly taste. Morale was dangerously low by May and the state of discipline on a moral basis had a new low barometer for acceptable behavior. The ruthless atrocities by the Japanese throughout the war had already brought on an altered behavior (deemed so by traditional standards) by many Americans resulting in the desecration of Japanese remains, but the Japanese tactic of using the Okinawan people as human shields brought about a new aspect of terror and torment to the psychological capacity of the Americans.

Medal of Honor recipients from Okinawa are:
Marine Corps

- Richard E. Bush – 16 April
- Henry A. Courtney Jr. – 14–15 May (posth.)
- James L. Day – 14–17 May
- John P. Fardy – 7 May (posth.)
- William A. Foster – 2 May (posth.)
- Harold Gonsalves – 15 April (posth.)
- Dale M. Hansen – 7 May (posth.)
- Louis J. Hauge Jr. – 14 May (posth.)
- Elbert L. Kinser – 4 May (posth.)
- Robert M. McTureous Jr. – 7 June (posth.)
- Albert E. Schwab – 7 May (posth.)

Army

- Beauford T. Anderson – 13 April
- Clarence B. Craft – 31 May
- Desmond Doss – 29 April – 21 May
- Martin O. May – 19–21 April (posth.)
- Seymour W. Terry – 11 May (posth.)
- John W. Meagher – 19 June
- Edward J. Moskala – 9 April (posth.)
- Joseph E. Muller – 15–16 May (posth.)
- Alejandro R. Ruiz – 28 April

Navy

- Robert Eugene Bush – 2 May
- William D. Halyburton Jr. – 10 May (posth.)
- Fred F. Lester – 8 June (posth.)
- Richard M. McCool Jr. – 10–11 June

==== Allied naval losses ====
The following table lists the Allied naval vessels that received damage or were sunk in the Battle of Okinawa between 19 March – 30 July 1945. The table lists a total of 147 damaged ships, five of which were damaged by enemy suicide boats and another five by mines. During the naval battle, which started before the amphibious landings on Okinawa on 1 April, USS Franklin suffered over 800 killed and missing and USS Bunker Hill suffered 396 killed and missing. These were the first and third largest loss of life on damaged or sunken American aircraft carriers during World War II. USS Franklin (hit by two bombs in a level bombing attack by a D4Y Suisei (Judy) on 19 March 1945) and USS Bunker Hill were the only two aircraft carriers that sustained very severe damage from Japanese attacks and as a result were the only aircraft carriers in the Essex class that did not experience any active service after the end of World War II. One source estimated that total Japanese sorties during the entire Okinawa campaign exceeded 3,700, with a large percentage being kamikaze attacks, and that the attackers damaged slightly more than 200 Allied vessels, with 4,900 naval officers and seamen killed and roughly 4,824 wounded or missing. USS Thorton was damaged as the result of a collision with another US ship.

The Japanese air attacks were so intense that Fifth Fleet commander Admiral Spruance's flagships were struck two separate times (USS Indianapolis was hit in March and had to retire for repairs which forced him to transfer to USS New Mexico which was also hit in May). Fast Carrier Task Force commander Vice Admiral Marc Mitscher and his chief of staff Commodore Arleigh Burke were yards away from getting killed or wounded by kamikazes on his flagship USS Bunker Hill, which killed three of Mitscher's staff officers and eleven of his enlisted staff members and also destroyed his flag cabin along with all of his uniforms, personal papers, and possessions. Just three days later Mitscher's new flagship USS Enterprise was also struck by a kamikaze forcing him to have to change his flagship yet again. Both fleet carriers were knocked out for the rest of the war.

* sunk or had to be scuttled due to irreparable damage. Of those sunk, the majority were relatively smaller ships; these included destroyers of around 300–450 feet. A few small cargo ships were also sunk, several containing munitions which caught fire.

# scrapped or decommissioned as a result of damage.

Allied Naval vessels sunk or damaged by Japanese forces at Okinawa, primarily kamikazes, 19 March – 30 July 1945
Day	Ship	Type	Cause	Killed	Wounded
19 Mar 45	USS Wasp	Carrier	Air attack, bomb through flight, & hangar decks	102	269
19 Mar 45	USS Franklin	Carrier	Air attack	807	487
20 Mar 45	USS Enterprise	Carrier	Air attack, two near misses from bombs, at the same time of near misses immediately hit by two 5-inch AA shells from U.S. ships	9	28
20 Mar 45	USS Hasley Powell	Destroyer	Air attack, kamikaze	12	29
24 Mar 45	USS Nevada	Battleship	Air attack, kamikaze hit and knocked out 14-inch guns in turret number 3	11	49
26 Mar 45	* USS Haligan	Destroyer	Mine, 3 miles SE of Maye Shima, exploded two forward magazines, bow blown off	153	39
26 Mar 45	USS Kimberly	Destroyer	Air attack, kamikaze	4	57
27 Mar 45	USS Murray	Destroyer	Air attack, bomb	1	116
27 Mar 45	USS O'Brian	Destroyer	Air attack, Val kamikaze with bomb	50	76
28 Mar 45	* USS Skylark	Small Minesweeper	Mine, struck mines twice off Hagushi beaches	5	25
28 Mar 45	USS LSM(R)-188	Landing Ship	Air attack, kamikaze	15	32
29 Mar 45	USS Wyandot	Attack Cargo Ship	Mine, possibly bomb	0	1
31 Mar 45	USS Indianapolis (Note: flagship of Admiral Raymond Spruance)	Cruiser	Air attack, kamikaze with bomb through fuel tanks and propeller shafts	9	20
1 Apr 45	USS Adams	Destroyer Minelayer	Air attack, kamikaze with bombs to fantail	0	0
1 Apr 45	USS Alpine	Attack Transport	Air attack, bomb and kamikaze	16	27
1 Apr 45	USS Hinsdale	Attack Transport	Air attack, kamikaze with bombs at waterline	16	39
1 Apr 45	# USS LST-884	Tank Landing Ship	Air attack, kamikaze, scuttled 6 May	24	21
1 Apr 45	HMS Ulster	Destroyer	Air attack, near miss bomb, badly damaged	2	1
1 Apr 45	USS West Virginia	Battleship	Air attack, kamikaze	4	23
2 Apr 45	USS New York	Battleship	Air attack, kamikaze destroyed search plane on catapult	0	2
2 Apr 45	* USS Dickerson	Destroyer Transport	Air attack, kamikaze Nick crashed bridge, towed, scuttled	54	23
2 Apr 45	USS Goodhue	Attack Transport	Air attack, kamikaze aimed at bridge glanced mainmast, hit cargo boom, gun tubs, over side	24	119
2 Apr 45	USS Henrico	Attack Transport	Air attack, kamikaze w/bombs hit bridge	49	125
2 Apr 45	USS Achernar	Attack Cargo Ship	Air attack, kamikaze w/bomb hit starboard	5	41
3 Apr 45	USS Wake Island	Escort Carrier	Air attack, kamikaze blew below waterline	0	0
3 Apr 45	USS Pritchett	Destroyer	Air attack, 500 lb bomb	0	0
3 Apr 45	USS Foreman	Destroyer	Air attack, bomb passed through her bottom, exploded below	0	3
3 Apr 45	USS LST-599	Tank Landing Ship	Air attack, kamikaze through main deck, fires	0	21
3 Apr 45	# USS LCT-876	Landing Craft Tank	Air attack	0	2
4 Apr 45	* USS LCI(G)-82	Landing Craft, Infantry	Suicide boat	8	11
5 Apr 45	USS Nevada	Battleship	Air attack 25 Mar and 5 April coastal battery	2	16
6 Apr 45	* USS Bush	Destroyer	Air attack, three kamikaze hits, two between stacks, blew forward engine room, broke in half	94	32
6 Apr 45	* USS Colhoun	Destroyer	Air attack, four kamikaze hits, bombs blew forward, & aft fire rooms at waterline	35	21
6 Apr 45	USS Howorth	Destroyer	Air attack, kamikaze struck superstructure, fires put out	9	14
6 Apr 45	USS Hyman	Destroyer	Air attack, kamikaze Hampton hit torpedo tubes twixt stacks	10	40
6 Apr 45	# USS Leutze	Destroyer	Air attack, kamikaze blew at fantail, bad flooding	7	34
6 Apr 45	# USS Morris	Destroyer	Air attack, kate kamikaze portside	0	5
6 Apr 45	USS Mullany	Destroyer	Air attack, kamikaze hit depth charges	13	45
6 Apr 45	# USS Newcomb	Destroyer	Air attack, multiple kamikazes	40	24
6 Apr 45	USS Haynsworth	Destroyer	Air attack, kamikaze	7	25
6 Apr 45	# USS Witter	Destroyer Escort	Starboard waterline kamikaze	0	5
6 Apr 45	USS Fieberling	Destroyer	Air attack, kamikaze near miss	6	6
6 Apr 45	* USS Emmons	Destroyer Minesweeper	Air attack, five kamikaze hits, scuttled 7 April	64	71
6 Apr 45	USS Rodman	Destroyer Minesweeper	Air attack, four kamikaze hits	16	20
6 Apr 45	USS Defense	Small Minesweeper	Air attack, two kamikaze strikes	0	9
6 Apr 45	* USS LST-447	Landing Ship	Air attack, kamikaze hit close above waterline, bomb blew	5	17
6 Apr 45	* SS Hobbs Victory	Cargo	Air attack, kamikaze struck port, flames ignited ammunition	15	3
6 Apr 45	* SS Logan Victory	Cargo	Air attack, kamikaze struck superstructure, flames ignited ammunition	16	11
7 Apr 45	USS Hancock	Carrier	Air attack, cartwheeling kamikaze	72	82
7 Apr 45	USS Maryland	Battleship	Air attack, kamikaze hit starboard	16	37
7 Apr 45	USS Bennett	Destroyer	Air attack, kamikaze hit engine room	3	18
7 Apr 45	USS Wesson	Destroyer	Air attack, kamikaze starboard	8	23
7 Apr 45	* USS PGM-18	Small Gunboat	Mine, powerful explosion	14	14
7 Apr 45	* YMS-103	Small Minesweeper	Mine, struck two mines, blowing off her bow and stem rescuing PGM-18	5	0
8 Apr 45	USS Gregory	Destroyer	Air attack, port kamikaze amidships near waterline	0	2
8 Apr 45	USS YMS-92	Small Sweeper	Air attack	0	0
9 Apr 45	USS Charles J. Badger	Destroyer	Suicide boat threw depth charge or mine	0	0
9 Apr 45	USS Sterett	Destroyer	Air attack, kamikaze hit starboard at waterline	0	9
9 Apr 45	USS Hopping	Destroyer Transport	Coastal Battery, damaging hits off Buckner Bay	2	18
11 Apr 45	USS Enterprise	Carrier	Air attack, two kamikazes hit at the waterline near her hull	1	18
11 Apr 45	USS Kidd	Destroyer	Air attack, kamikaze	38	55
11 Apr 45	USS Missouri	Battleship	Air attack, kamikaze	0	0
12 Apr 45	USS Idaho	Battleship	Air attack, kamikaze hit port side anti-torpedo bulge	0	0
12 Apr 45	USS Tennessee	Battleship	Air attack, kamikaze hit signal bridge	25	104
12 Apr 45	* USS Mannert L. Abele	Destroyer	Air attack, kamikaze	79	35
12 Apr 45	USS Purdy	Destroyer	Air attack, splashed kamikaze bomb skidded in	13	27
12 Apr 45	USS Cassin Young	Destroyer	Air attack, kamikaze hit foremast	1	59
12 Apr 45	USS Zellars	Destroyer	Air attack, kamikaze crashed port, bomb blew	29	37
12 Apr 45	USS Rall	Destroyer	Air attack, kamikaze starboard aft, bomb blew	21	38
12 Apr 45	USS Whitehurst	Destroyer Escort	Air attack, kamikaze with bomb crashed into pilot house	37	37
12 Apr 45	USS Lindsey	Destroyer Minelayer	Air attack, two kamikaze Val strikes	56	51
12 Apr 45	USS LSM(R)-189	Landing Ship	Air attack, kamikaze	0	4
12 Apr 45	* USS LCS(L)-33	Landing Craft	Air attack, kamikaze Val amidships	4	29
12 Apr 45	USS LCS(L)-57	Landing Craft	Air attack, three kamikaze strikes	2	6
14 Apr 45	USS Sigsbee	Destroyer	Air attack, kamikaze damaged port engine	4	74
16 Apr 45	USS Intrepid	Carrier	Air attack, kamikaze crashed deck, fires put out	10	87
16 Apr 45	USS Bryant	Destroyer	Air attack, kamikaze to bridge, with explosion	34	33
16 Apr 45	USS Laffey	Destroyer	Air attack, multiple kamikaze hits	31	72
16 Apr 45	* USS Pringle	Destroyer	Air attack, kamikaze Val hit abaft stack No. 1, explosion, broke in half	65	110
16 Apr 45	USS Bowers	Destroyer Escort	Air attack, kamikaze to bridge, bomb hit pilot house	48	56
16 Apr 45	# USS Harding	Destroyer Minesweeper	Air attack, kamikaze struck side near bridge	22	10
16 Apr 45	USS Hobson	Destroyer Minesweeper	Air attack, near miss kamikaze's bomb veered in	4	8
16 Apr 45	USS LCS(L)-116	Landing Craft	Air attack, kamikaze hit aft gun mount	12	12
16 Apr 45	USS Missouri	Battleship	Air attack, kamikaze hit stern crane	0	2
18 Apr 45	USS LSM-28	Landing Ship	Air attack	0	0
22 Apr 45	USS Isherwood	Destroyer	Air attack, kamikaze w/bomb crashed gun mount	42	41
22 Apr 45	* USS Swallow	Small Sweeper	Air attack, bad kamikaze hit flooded her, 3 mins sunk	2	9
22 Apr 45	* USS LCS(L)-15	Landing Craft	Air attack	15	11
27 Apr 45	# USS Hutchins	Destroyer	Suicide boat explosive blew close	0	0
27 Apr 45	# USS Rathburne	Destroyer	Air attack, kamikaze hit port bow waterline	0	0
27 Apr 45	* SS Canada Victory	Cargo	Air attack, kamikaze hit stern, lit ammo, sunk in ten minutes	12	27
28 Apr 45	USS Pinkney	Destroyer	Air attack, kamikaze hit aft of superstructure, lit ammo	35	12
28 Apr 45	USS Comfort	Hospital Ship	Air attack, kamikaze through three decks to surgery	30	48
29 Apr 45	# USS Haggard	Destroyer	Air attack, kamikaze went through hull, blew engine room	11	40
29 Apr 45	USS Hazelwood	Destroyer	Air attack, kamikaze zero hit port bridge	46	26
29 Apr 45	# USS LCS(L)-37	Landing Craft	Suicide boat	0	4
30 Apr 45	USS Terror	Minelayer	Air attack, kamikaze blew through main deck	48	123
3 May 45	* USS Little	Destroyer	Air attack, five kamikaze strikes	30	79
3 May 45	# USS Aaron Ward	Destroyer Minelayer	Air attack; three kamikaze hits and bomb frags	45	49
3 May 45	USS Macomb	Destroyer Minelayer	Air attack, kamikaze	7	14
3 May 45	* USS LSM(R)-195	Landing Ship	Air attack, kamikaze hit rockets, sunk	8	16
4 May 45	# USS Sangamon	Escort Carrier	Air attack, kamikaze & bomb blew through flight deck	46	116
4 May 45	USS Birmingham	Light Cruiser	Air attack, kamikaze hit forward	51	81
4 May 45	USS Ingraham	Destroyer	Air attack, kamikaze above port waterline, bomb blew	14	37
4 May 45	HMS Formidable	Carrier	Air attack, kamikaze & bomb blew through flight deck	8	55
4 May 45	USS Hopkins	Destroyer Minesweeper	Air attack, glancing blow by burning kamikaze	0	1
4 May 45	* USS Luce	Destroyer	Air attack, first kamikaze bomb hit, second kamikaze struck aft	149	94
4 May 45	* USS Morrison	Destroyer	Air attack, first kamikaze hit bridge, then three more hits	159	102
4 May 45	USS Shea	Destroyer	Air attack, Ohka kamikaze through starboard bridge	27	91
4 May 45	USS Carina	Cargo Ship	Suicide boat ramming caused explosion	0	6
4 May 45	* USS LSM(R)-190	Landing Ship	Air attack, kamikaze set off her rockets	13	18
4 May 45	* USS LSM(R)-194	Landing Ship	Air attack	13	23
9 May 45	# USS England	Destroyer	Air attack, kamikaze dive bomber	35	27
9 May 45	HMS Formidable	Carrier	Air attack, kamikaze	1	4
9 May 45	# USS Oberrender	Destroyer Escort	Air attack, kamikaze hit starboard gun mount, bomb through main deck	8	53
11 May 45	USS Bunker Hill (Note: flagship of Vice Admiral Marc Mitscher)	Carrier	Air attack, three kamikaze hits with bombs through flight deck	396	264
11 May 45	# USS Hugh W. Hadley	Destroyer	Air attack, aft bomb, an Ohka, and two more kamikazes struck	28	67
11 May 45	# USS Evans	Destroyer	Air attack, struck by four kamikazes, fires put out	30	29
11 May 45	USS LCS(L)-88	Landing Craft	Air attack	7	9
12 May 45	USS New Mexico (Note: flagship of Admiral Raymond Spruance)	Battleship	Air attack, kamikaze hit, bomb	54	119
13 May 45	USS Bache	Destroyer	Air attack, kamikaze hit, bomb exploded amidships just above main deck	41	32
13 May 45	USS Bright	Destroyer Escort	Air attack, kamikaze zero hit fantail, bomb exploded	0	2
14 May 45	USS Enterprise (Note: flagship of Vice Admiral Marc Mitscher)	Carrier	Air attack, two kamikazes, struck port, & under starboard bow	14	68
17 May 45	USS Douglas H. Fox	Destroyer	Two kamikaze strikes, one to forward gun mounts, one to fantail	9	35
18 May 45	* USS Longshaw	Destroyer	Coastal Battery, four hits, one ignited magazine, blew off bow back to bridge	86	97
18 May 45	* USS LST-808	Landing Ship Tank	Air attack	11	11
20 May 45	# USS Chase	Destroyer Escort	Air attack, splashed kamikaze skidded in, bombs opened hull, with flooding	0	35
20 May 45	# USS Thatcher	Destroyer	Air attack, kamikaze Oscar struck aft of bridge, large hole	14	53
20 May 45	# USS John C. Butler	Destroyer Escort	Air attack, kamikaze hit to mast and antennas	0	0
25 May 45	USS Stormes	Destroyer	Air attack, crashed aft torpedo mount, bomb blew large hole, flooded aft	21	6
25 May 45	USS O'Neill	Destroyer Escort	Air attack, kamikaze	0	16
25 May 45	USS Butler	Destroyer Minesweeper	Air attack, kamikaze bombs exploded under keel	0	15
25 May 45	# USS Spectacle	Small Minesweeper	Air attack, kamikaze crashed port gun tub causing fires	29	6
25 May 45	* USS Barry	Destroyer Transport	Air attack, kamikaze badly crashed starboard side, fires, abandoned	0	30
25 May 45	* USS Bates	Destroyer Escort	Air attack, two kamikaze hits, fires, abandoned, towed, later sank	21	35
25 May 45	USS Roper	Destroyer	Air attack, kamikaze hit off Hanagushi, Okinawa	1	10
25 May 45	* LSM-135	Landing Ship	Air attack, kamikaze caused fires, beached, abandoned	11	10
25 May 45	SS William B. Allison (aka USS Inca)	Cargo Ship, Liberty Ship	Air attack, Aerial Torpedo off Nakagusuku Wan	8	2
27 May 45	USS Braine	Destroyer	Air attack, two kamikazes, first hit bridge, and second hit amidships	66	78
27 May 45	# USS Forrest	Destroyer Minesweeper	Air attack, kamikaze crashed starboard side waterline	5	13
27 May 45	USS Rednour	Transport	Air attack, two kamikazes hits, one made ten foot hole in main deck	3	13
27 May 45	USS Loy	Destroyer Escort	Air attack, kamikaze near miss sprayed fragments	3	15
27 May 45	LCS(L)-119	Landing Craft	Air attack	12	6
28 May 45	* USS Drexler	Destroyer	Air attack, first kamikaze Frances hit topside, second Francis with bombs crashed into superstructure	158	51
28 May 45	USS Sandoval	Attack Transport	Air attack, kamikaze hit portside of wheelhouse	8	26
28 May 45	SS Brown Victory	Cargo	Air attack, kamikaze hit	4	16
28 May 45	SS Josiah Snelling	Cargo	Air attack, kamikaze hit	0	11
28 May 45	SS Mary A. Livermore	Cargo	Air attack, kamikaze hit on starboard	10	4
29 May 45	USS Shubrick	Destroyer	Air attack, kamikaze bomb hit starboard causing hole, exploding depth charge	32	28
3 June 45	# USS LCI-90	Landing Craft Infantry	Air attack, kamikaze	1	7
5 Jun 45	USS Louisville	Cruiser	Air attack, kamikaze hit quad 40mm AA gun mount and number 1 smoke stack	8	45
5 Jun 45	USS Mississippi	Battleship	Air attack, kamikaze hit	1	2
6 June 45	# USS J. William Ditter	Destroyer Minelayer	Air attack, first kamikaze glanced, second hit port near main deck	10	27
6 Jun 45	USS Harry F. Bauer	Destroyer Minelayer	Air attack, kamikaze hit superstructure	0	0
7 June 45	USS Natoma Bay	Escort carrier	Air attack, kamikaze hit flight deck	1	4
10 Jun 45	* USS William D. Porter	Destroyer	Air attack, splashed kamikaze Val's bomb exploded close underwater	0	61
11 Jun 45	USS LCS(L)-122	Landing Craft	Air attack kamikaze hit conning tower base, bomb fragments caused fires	11	29
16 Jun 45	* USS Twiggs	Destroyer	Air attack, splashed kamikaze and bomb blew in hull plating, with structural damage	126	34
21 Jun 45	USS Halloran	Destroyer Escort	Air attack, splashed kamikaze's bomb struck	3	24
21 Jun 45	USS Curtiss	Seaplane Tender	Air attack, kamikaze and bomb ripped two holes in hull and blew	41	28
21 Jun 45	* USS LSM-59	Landing Ship	Air attack, kamikaze strike while towing USS Barry, sank in four minutes	2	8
22 Jun 45	USS LSM-213	Landing Ship	Air attack, kamikaze strike at Kimmu Wan, hull damage	3	10
22 Jun 45	USS LST-534	Landing Ship Tank	Air attack, while offloading on Nagagusuku Wan, kamikaze hit bow doors, tank deck	3	35
29 Jul 45	* USS Callaghan	Destroyer	Air attack, bi-plane kamikaze hit, its bomb blew aft engine room, sunk	47	73
30 Jul 45	USS Cassin Young	Destroyer	Air attack, kamikaze hit forward, earlier hit 12 April	22	45
Total				4582	6043

==== Japanese losses ====
The US military estimates that 110,071 Japanese soldiers were killed during the battle. This total includes conscripted Okinawan civilians.

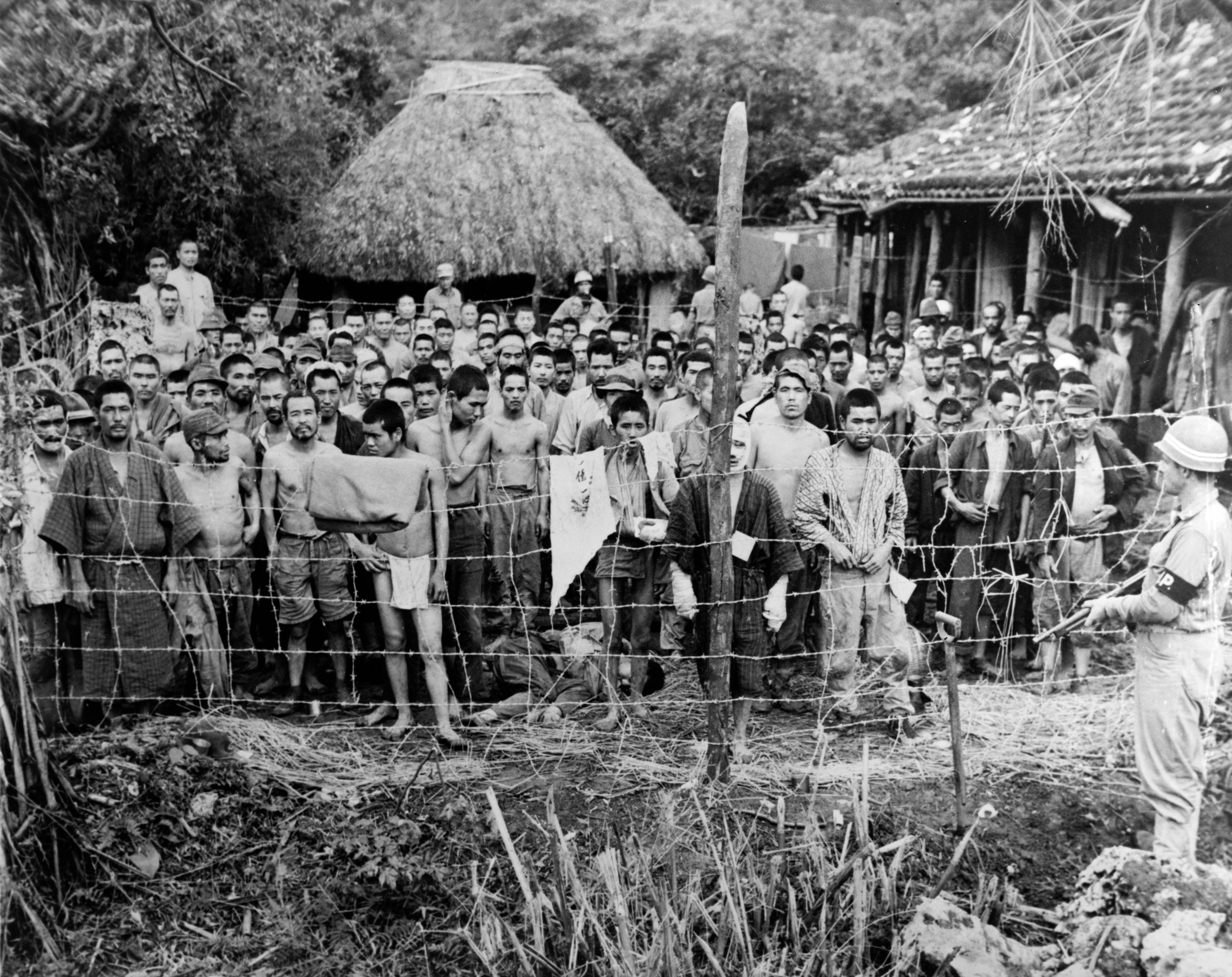
A group of Japanese prisoners taken in June 1945

A total of 7,401 Japanese regulars and 3,400 Okinawan conscripts surrendered or were captured during the battle of Okinawa. Additional Japanese and renegade Okinawans were captured or surrendered over the next few months, bringing the total to 16,346. This was the first battle in the Pacific War in which thousands of Japanese soldiers surrendered or were captured. Many of the prisoners were native Okinawans who had been pressed into service shortly before the battle and were less imbued with the Imperial Japanese Army's no-surrender doctrine. When the American forces occupied the island, many Japanese soldiers put on Okinawan clothing to avoid capture, and some Okinawans would come to the Americans' aid by offering to identify these mainland Japanese.

The Japanese lost 16 combat vessels, including the super battleship Yamato. Early claims of Japanese aircraft losses put the total at 7,800, however later examination of Japanese records revealed that Japanese aircraft losses at Okinawa were far below often-repeated US estimates for the campaign. The number of conventional and kamikaze aircraft actually lost or expended by the 3rd, 5th, and 10th Air Fleets, combined with about 500 lost or expended by the Imperial Army at Okinawa, was roughly 1,430. The Allies destroyed 27 Japanese tanks and 743 artillery pieces (including mortars, anti-tank and anti-aircraft guns), some of them eliminated by the naval and air bombardments but most knocked out by American counter-battery fire.

=== Civilian losses, suicides, and atrocities ===
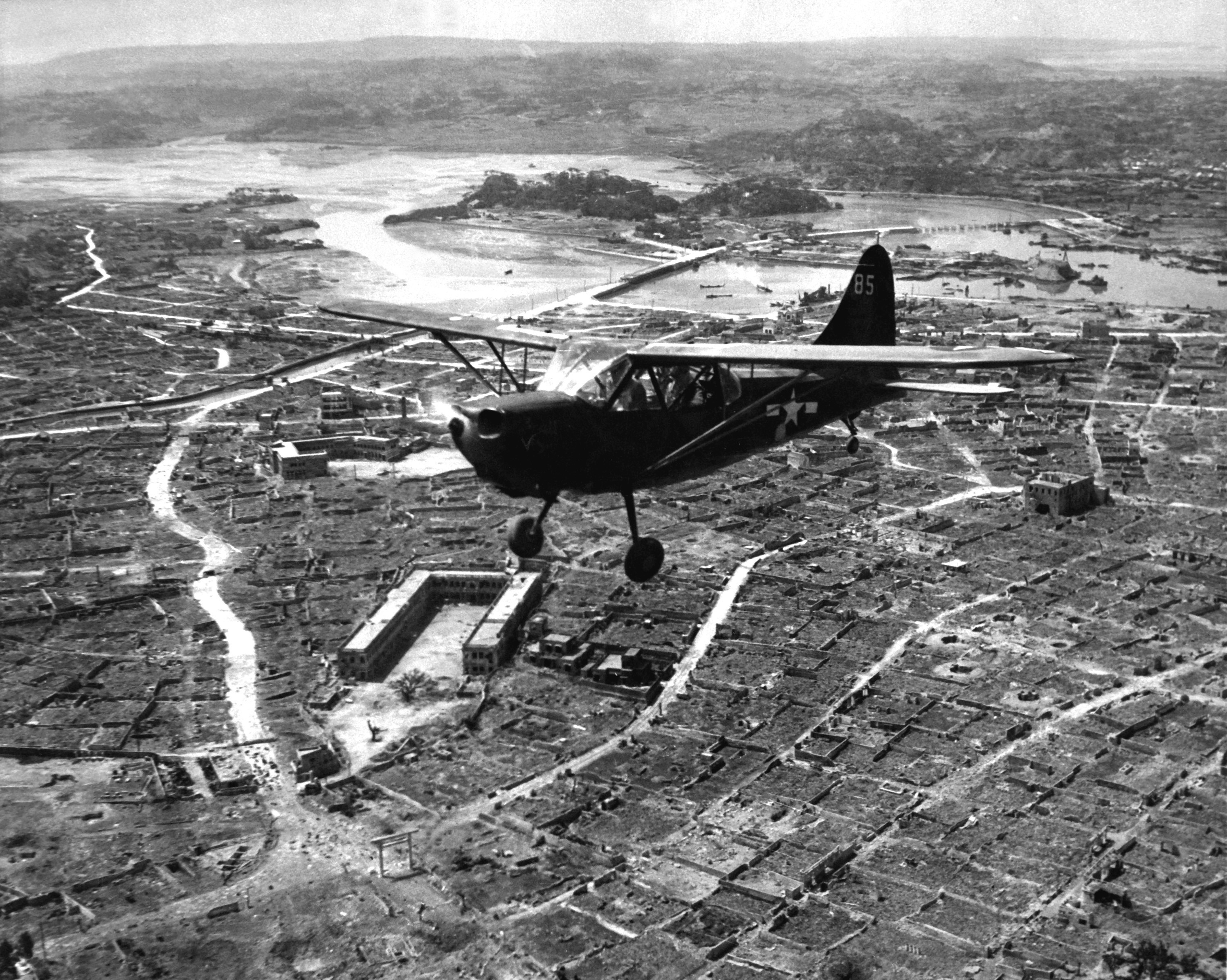
A US Marine Corps Stinson Sentinel observation plane flies over the razed Naha, capital of Okinawa, in May 1945.

Some of the other islands that saw major battles in World War II, such as Iwo Jima, were uninhabited or had been evacuated. Okinawa, by contrast, had a large indigenous civilian population; US Army records from the planning phase of the operation made the assumption that Okinawa was home to about 300,000 civilians. The official US Tenth Army count for the 82-day campaign is a total of 142,058 recovered enemy bodies (including those civilians pressed into service by the Imperial Japanese Army), with the deduction made that about 42,000 were non-uniformed civilians who had been killed in the crossfire. Okinawa Prefecture's estimate is over 100,000 losses.

During the battle, American forces found it difficult to distinguish civilians from soldiers. It became common for them to shoot at Okinawan houses, as one infantryman wrote:

There was some return fire from a few of the houses, but the others were probably occupied by civilians—and we didn't care. It was a terrible thing not to distinguish between the enemy and women and children. Americans always had great compassion, especially for children. Now we fired indiscriminately.

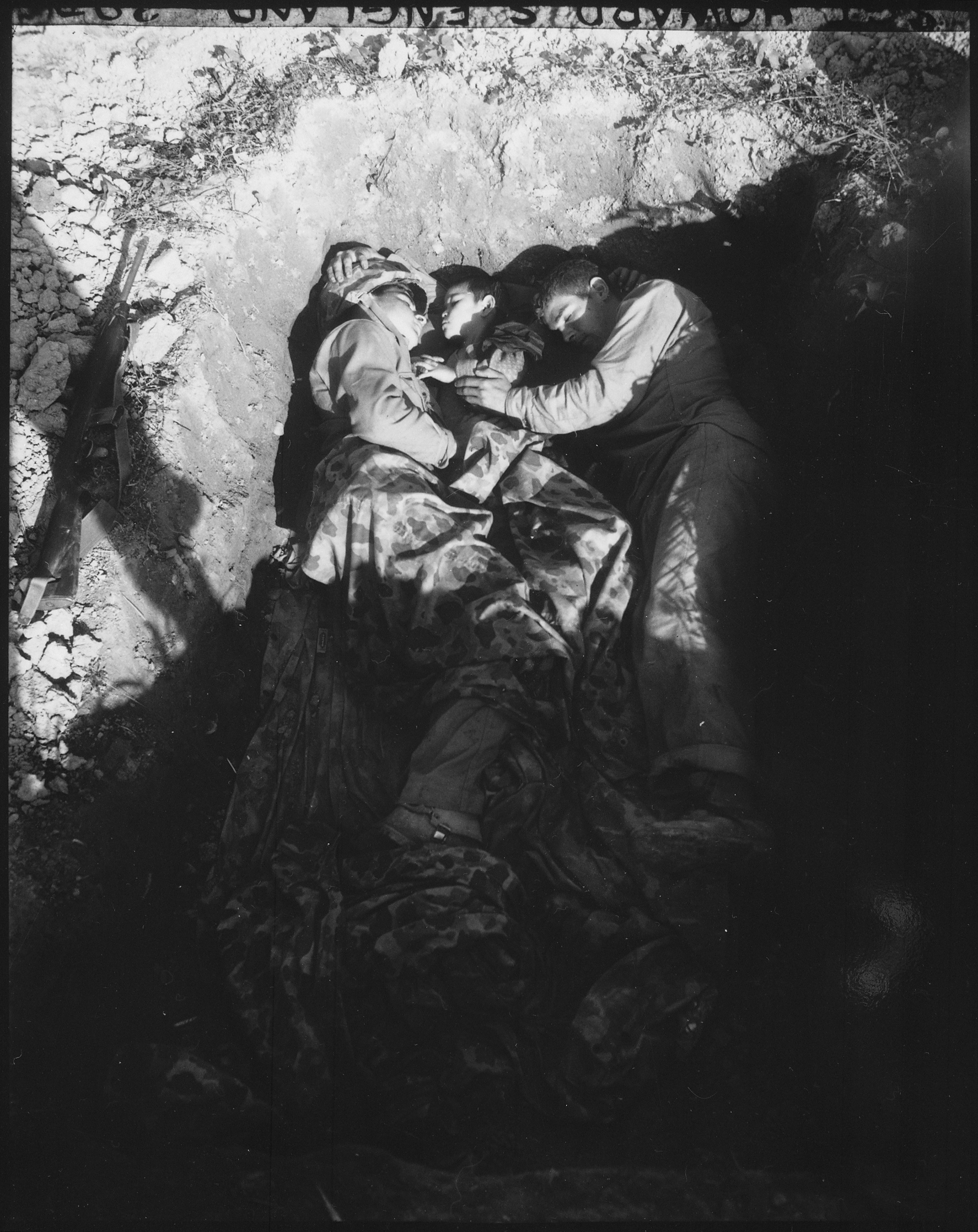
Two US Marines share a foxhole with an Okinawan war orphan in April 1945.

In its history of the war, the Okinawa Prefectural Peace Memorial Museum presents Okinawa as being caught between Japan and the United States. During the battle, the Imperial Japanese Army showed indifference to Okinawans' safety, and its soldiers used civilians as human shields or outright killed them. The Japanese military also confiscated food from the Okinawans and executed those who hid it, leading to mass starvation, and forced civilians out of their shelters. Japanese soldiers also killed about 1,000 people who spoke in the Okinawan language to suppress spying. The museum writes that "some were blown apart by [artillery] shells, some finding themselves in a hopeless situation were driven to suicide, some died of starvation, some succumbed to malaria, while others fell victim to the retreating Japanese troops."

With the impending Japanese defeat, civilians often committed mass suicide, urged on by the Japanese soldiers who told locals that victorious American soldiers would go on a rampage of killing and raping. Ryūkyū Shimpō, one of the two major Okinawan newspapers, wrote in 2007: "There are many Okinawans who have testified that the Japanese Army directed them to commit suicide. There are also people who have testified that they were handed grenades by Japanese soldiers" to blow themselves up. Thousands of civilians, having been induced by Japanese propaganda to believe that American soldiers were barbarians who committed horrible atrocities, killed their families and themselves to avoid capture at the hands of the Americans. Some of them threw themselves and their family members from the southern cliffs where the Peace Museum now resides.

Okinawans "were often surprised at the comparatively humane treatment they received from the American enemy". Islands of Discontent: Okinawan Responses to Japanese and American Power by Mark Selden states that the Americans "did not pursue a policy of torture, rape, and murder of civilians as Japanese military officials had warned". American Military Intelligence Corps combat translators such as Teruto Tsubota managed to convince many civilians not to kill themselves. Survivors of the mass suicides blamed also the indoctrination of their education system of the time, in which the Okinawans were taught to become "more Japanese than the Japanese" and were expected to prove it.

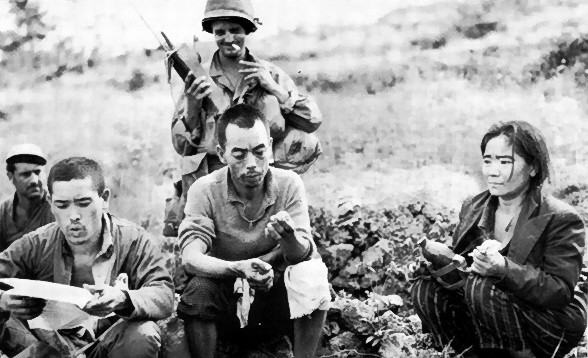
Overcoming the civilian resistance on Okinawa was aided by US propaganda leaflets, one of which is being read by a prisoner awaiting transport.

Witnesses and historians claim that American and Japanese soldiers raped Okinawan women during the battle. Rape by Japanese troops reportedly "became common" in June, after it became clear that the Imperial Japanese Army had been defeated. Marine Corps officials in Okinawa and Washington have said that they knew of no rapes by American personnel in Okinawa at the end of the war. There are, however, numerous credible testimony accounts which note that a large number of rapes were committed by American forces during the battle. This includes stories of rape after trading sexual favors or even marrying Americans, such as the alleged incident in the village of Katsuyama, where civilians said they had formed a vigilante group to ambush and kill three black American soldiers whom they claimed would frequently rape the local girls there.

==== MEXT textbook controversy ====
There is ongoing disagreement between Okinawa's local government and Japan's national government over the role of the Japanese military in civilian mass suicides during the battle. In March 2007, the national Ministry of Education, Culture, Sports, Science and Technology (MEXT) advised textbook publishers to reword descriptions that the embattled Imperial Japanese Army forced civilians to kill themselves in the war to avoid being taken prisoner. MEXT preferred descriptions that just say that civilians received hand grenades from the Japanese military. This move sparked widespread protests among Okinawans. In June 2007, the Okinawa Prefectural Assembly adopted a resolution stating, "We strongly call on the (national) government to retract the instruction and to immediately restore the description in the textbooks so the truth of the Battle of Okinawa will be handed down correctly and a tragic war will never happen again."

On 29 September 2007, about 110,000 people held the biggest political rally in the history of Okinawa to demand that MEXT retract its order to textbook publishers regarding revising the account of the civilian suicides. The resolution states, "It is an undeniable fact that the 'multiple suicides' would not have occurred without the involvement of the Japanese military and any deletion of or revision to (the descriptions) is a denial and distortion of the many testimonies by those people who survived the incidents." In December 2007, MEXT partially admitted the role of the Japanese military in civilian mass suicides. The ministry's Textbook Authorization Council allowed the publishers to reinstate the reference that civilians "were forced into mass suicides by the Japanese military", on condition it is placed in sufficient context. The council report states, "It can be said that from the viewpoint of the Okinawa residents, they were forced into the mass suicides." That was not enough for the survivors who said it is important for children today to know what really happened.

The Nobel Prize-winning author Kenzaburō Ōe wrote a booklet that states that the mass suicide order was given by the military during the battle. He was sued by revisionists, including a wartime commander during the battle, who disputed this and wanted to stop publication of the booklet. At a court hearing, Ōe testified "Mass suicides were forced on Okinawa islanders under Japan's hierarchical social structure that ran through the state of Japan, the Japanese armed forces and local garrisons." In March 2008, the Osaka Prefecture Court ruled in favor of Ōe, stating, "It can be said the military was deeply involved in the mass suicides." The court recognized the military's involvement in the mass suicides and murder-suicides, citing the testimony about the distribution of grenades for suicide by soldiers and the fact that mass suicides were not recorded on islands where the military was not stationed.

In 2012, Korean-Japanese director Pak Su-nam announced her work on the documentary Nuchigafu (Okinawan for "only if one is alive") collecting living survivors' accounts to show "the truth of history to many people", alleging that "there were two types of orders for 'honorable deaths'—one for residents to kill each other and the other for the military to kill all residents". In March 2013, Japanese textbook publisher Shimizu Shoin was permitted by MEXT to publish the statements that "Orders from Japanese soldiers led to Okinawans committing group suicide" and "The [Japanese] army caused many tragedies in Okinawa, killing local civilians and forcing them to commit mass suicide."

== Aftermath ==
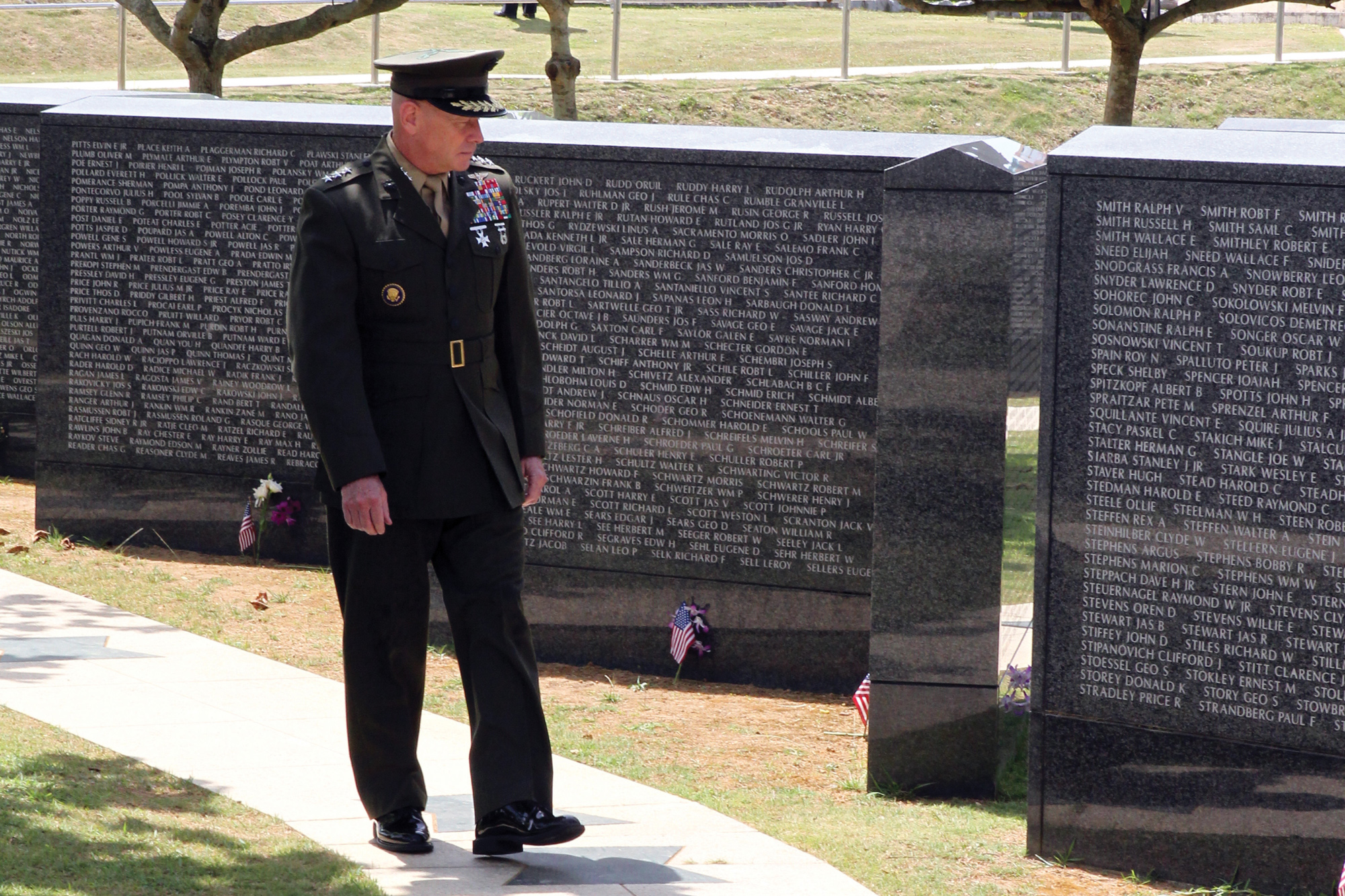
The Cornerstone of Peace Memorial with names of all military and civilians from all countries who died in the Battle of Okinawa

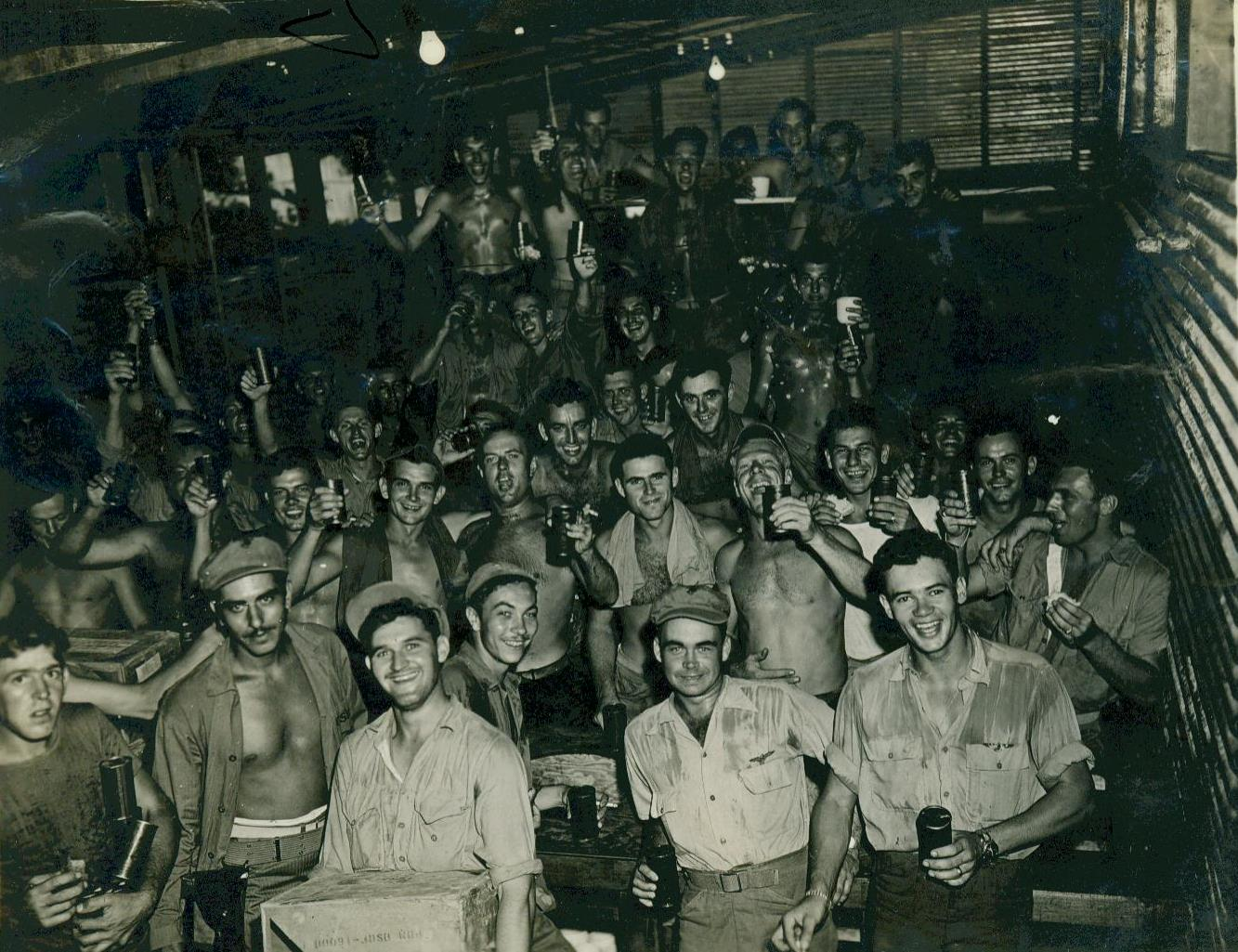
Marines celebrate Victory over Japan Day on Okinawa, August 1945

Military historian and journalist Hanson W. Baldwin stated about scale and ferocity of the battle, especially for American forces, that:

The battle for Okinawa can be described only in the grim superlatives of war. In size, scope and ferocity, it dwarfed the Battle of Britain. Never before had there been, probably never again will there be, such a vicious sprawling struggle of planes against planes, of ships against planes. Never before, in so short a space, had the Navy lost so many ships; never before in land fighting had so much American blood been shed in so short a time in so small an area: probably never before in any three months of the war had the enemy suffered so hugely, and the final toll of American casualties was the highest experienced in any campaign against the Japanese. There have been larger land battles, more protracted air campaigns, but Okinawa was the largest combined operation, a "no quarter" struggle fought on, under and over the sea and land.

According to historian George Feifer, Okinawa was the "site of the largest land-sea-air battle in history" and that the battle was the "last major one before the start of the atomic age". At least 90% of the buildings on the island were destroyed, along with countless historical documents, artifacts, and cultural treasures, and the tropical landscape was turned into "a vast field of mud, lead, decay and maggots". The military value of Okinawa was significant, as Okinawa provided a fleet anchorage, troop staging areas, and airfields in proximity to Japan. The US cleared the surrounding waters of mines in Operation Zebra, occupied Okinawa, and set up the United States Civil Administration of the Ryukyu Islands, a form of military government, after the battle. In 2011, one official of the prefectural government told David Hearst of The Guardian:

You have the Battle of Britain, in which your airmen protected the British people. We had the Battle of Okinawa, in which the exact opposite happened. The Japanese army not only starved the Okinawans but used them as human shields. That dark history is still present today – and Japan and the US should study it before they decide what to do with next.

=== Effect on the wider war ===
Because the next major event following the Battle of Okinawa was the total surrender of Japan, the effect of this battle is more difficult to consider. Because Japan surrendered when it did, the anticipated series of battles and the invasion of the Japanese homeland never occurred, and all military strategies on both sides which presupposed this apparently-inevitable next development were immediately rendered moot.

Some military historians believe that the Okinawa campaign led directly to the atomic bombings of Hiroshima and Nagasaki, as a means of avoiding the planned ground invasion of the Japanese mainland. This view is explained by Victor Davis Hanson in his book Ripples of Battle:

... because the Japanese on Okinawa ... were so fierce in their defense (even when cut off and without supplies), and because casualties were so appalling, many American strategists looked for an alternative means to subdue mainland Japan, other than a direct invasion. This means presented itself, with the advent of atomic bombs, which worked admirably in convincing the Japanese to sue for peace [unconditionally], without American casualties.

Meanwhile, many parties continue to debate the broader question of "why Japan surrendered", attributing the surrender to a number of possible reasons including: the atomic bombings, the Soviet invasion of Manchuria, and Japan's depleted resources.

=== Memorial ===
In 1995, the Okinawa government erected a memorial monument named the Cornerstone of Peace in Mabuni, the site of the last fighting in southeastern Okinawa. The memorial lists all the known names of those who died in the battle, civilian and military, Japanese and foreign. As of 2024, the monument lists 242,225 names.

=== Modern US base ===
Significant US forces remain garrisoned on Okinawa as the United States Forces Japan, which the Japanese government sees as an important guarantee of regional stability, and Kadena remains the largest US air base in Asia. Local residents have long protested against the size and presence of the base.

== See also ==
- Himeyuri students – Japanese wartime nurses in Okinawa
- Chiran Peace Museum for Kamikaze Pilots – Museum in Kagoshima, Japan
- History of the Ryukyus
- Josef R. Sheetz – United States Army general (1895–1992)
- Rape during the occupation of Japan
- Suicide in Japan
- Okinawa Memorial Day – Local observance and public holiday, 23 June
- Naval Base Okinawa – United States military facilities in Okinawa Island, Japan
- Marine Corps Air Station Futenma – Airport
- Camp Hansen – U.S. Marine Corps base in Japan
- Torii Station – US Army facility in Yomitan, Okinawa Prefecture, Japan
- Camp Schwab – US Marine Corps camp in Okinawa Prefecture, Japan
- Camp Foster – U.S. Marine Corps facility in Okinawa, Japan
- Camp Kinser – US Marine Corps logistics base in Okinawa, Japan
- Giretsu Kuteitai – May 1945 Japanese commando raid on Allied held Okinawa airfields
- Okinawa Prefectural Peace Memorial Museum – Museum and memorial monument in Japan
