= 24th Division (Imperial Japanese Army) =

- Active: 1939 - 1945
- Country: Empire of Japan
- Branch: Imperial Japanese Army
- Type: Infantry
- Garrison/HQ: Harbin, Manchukuo
- Nickname(s): Mountain Division
- Engagements: Second Sino-Japanese War; Pacific War: Battle of Okinawa

Commanders
- Notable commanders: Lt. Gen. Amamiya Tatsumi †

The 24th Division (第24師団, Dai-nijūyon Shidan) was an infantry division in the Imperial Japanese Army. Its callsign was the Mountain Division (山兵団, Yamahei-dan). The 24th Division was formed in Harbin, Manchukuo on 6 October 1939, as part of the Manchukuo territorial defense force under overall command of the 5th Army group of the Kwantung Army.

== Action ==
22 February 1944, the 7th detachment consisting of companies from each regiment, including engineer regiment and field artillery regiment, was sent to Woleai island. The 7th detachment have reached Woleai in April 1944 and re-formed into 50th Independent Mixed Brigade in June 1944. Out of 6426 initial troops of the detachment, only 1650 have survived the air raids and starvation. Also, the 1st detachment comprising an infantry battalion from the 89th infantry regiment was sent to Saipan and reorganized eventually into 47th Independent Mixed Brigade. The 9th detachment, consisting of three infantry battalions, headed for Yap island, but was diverted to Saipan after some of the troop transports were sunk en route. Initially organized into 318th independent infantry battalions, the survivors ended up in 47th Independent Mixed Brigade. All troops who reached Saipan were eventually annihilated in Battle of Saipan in July 1944. Another battalion-sized 12th detachment have reached Yap uneventfully.

In July 1944, the 24th division remainders were sent to Okinawa prefecture as part of the final defense of the Japanese home islands against the American invasion, taking the positions prepared by the departing 9th division at Ōzato, Okinawa. Soon after the US landing 1 April 1945, the 2nd and 3rd battalions of the 22nd infantry regiment of the 24th division were used to reinforce the embattled 62nd division. For 24th division the Battle of Okinawa started north-west of Shuri, Okinawa 23 April 1945. In the all-out counterattack 4 May 1945, the 1st battalion of the 32nd infantry regiment managed to capture the Tanabaru heights in Nishihara, Okinawa, but the division failed to advance elsewhere. Following a war of attrition, by early June 1945 the 24th division had lost over 12000 troops and been reduced to approximately 3000 men. The division fragmented into several holdouts 20 June 1945, but the 1st and 3rd battalions of the 32nd infantry regiment continued to resist US occupation before surrendering in the late August to early September, 1945.

== Armament of the 24th division at the Battle of Okinawa ==
- Type 38 rifle - 7000
- Type 4 15 cm howitzer - 12
- Type 91 10 cm Howitzer - 16
- Type 95 75 mm Field Gun - 8

By early June 1945, all field gun and howitzers were destroyed, machine guns went down to 20% of normal complement, and mortars with infantry support guns were down to 10% of normal complement.

== See also ==
- List of Japanese Infantry Divisions

== Bibliography and further reading ==
- Fuller, Richard (1991). Shokan, Hirohito's Samurai - Leaders of the Japanese Armed Forces 1926-1945. London: Arms and Armour Press. ISBN 1-85409-151-4.
- Madej, W. Victor, Japanese Armed Forces Order of Battle, 1937-1945 [2 vols] Allentown, PA: 1981
- This article incorporates material from the Japanese Wikipedia page 第24師団 (日本軍), accessed 7 March 2016.
