= 62nd Division (Imperial Japanese Army) =

- Active: 1943 - 1945
- Country: Empire of Japan
- Branch: Imperial Japanese Army
- Type: Infantry
- Garrison/HQ: Taiyuan
- Nickname(s): Stone Division
- Engagements: Operation Ichi-Go; Battle of Okinawa

Commanders
- Notable commanders: Takeo Fujioka

The 62nd Division (第62師団, Dai-rokujūni Shidan) was an infantry division of the Imperial Japanese Army. Its call sign was the Stone Division (石兵団, Ishi Heidan). It was formed on 1 May 1943 in Taiyuan, simultaneously with the 63rd Division as a security (type C) division. The nucleus for the formation was the 4th and a part of the 6th Independent Mixed Brigades. As a security division, it lacked an artillery regiment. The division was initially assigned to the 1st Army.

== Action ==
Upon formation, the 62nd Division performed the garrison duties of the independent mixed brigades it replaced.

From March 1944, it was assigned to the 12th Army and participated in the Henan part of Operation Ichi-Go. After the fighting subsided in July 1944, the 62nd Division was removed from the front lines and subordinated first to the China Expeditionary Army and later directly to the Emperor's control.

In August 1944, the 62nd Division was assigned to the 32nd Army and sent to the Okinawan main island. The main batch of troops left Wusong District in Shanghai on 16 August 1944 and arrived at Naha on 19 August 1944. Soon afterward one of the divisional transports, the Tsushima Maru, was sunk on 22 August 1944 with a heavy death toll, as the majority of the passengers were evacuated schoolchildren. By December 1944 the 62nd Division had left the coastal defenses and manned the then vacant positions left by the 9th Division, which had left for Taiwan. In February 1945, the positions were further changed to include more of the large cities, with the goal of training militia units from the local population. This deployment resulted in significantly lower morale due to the abandonment of nearly complete coastal fortifications. It was decided to use the partially completed fortifications as false targets by Mitsuru Ushijima.

Starting on 1 April 1945, the division fought in the Battle of Okinawa, countering initial US advances at Chatan-Toguchi to the north and Naha-Yonabaru to the south. Also, the 2nd and 3rd Battalions of the 22nd Infantry Regiment had been transferred from the 24th Division to the area of what is now Kadena Air Base, under the command of the 62nd Division. As front lines stabilized, the 62nd Division was defending the positions in the Battle of Kakazu Ridge. The 13th Independent Infantry Battalion fought with particular distinction. Other important battlegrounds were Makiminato, Ganeko, and the Wauke (和宇慶) line. The 62nd Division was forced to start a retreat on 23 April 1945 and was completely annihilated on 22 June 1945 on the southern tip of Okinawa Island by the 1st Marine Division.

== See also ==
- List of Japanese Infantry Divisions
- Independent Mixed Brigades (Imperial Japanese Army)

== Notes ==
- This article incorporates material from Japanese Wikipedia page 第62師団 (日本軍), accessed 13 June 2016

== Reference and further reading ==
- Madej, W. Victor. Japanese Armed Forces Order of Battle, 1937-1945 [2 vols]

Allentown, PA: 1981
