= 63rd Division (Imperial Japanese Army) =

- Active: 1943 - 1945
- Country: Empire of Japan
- Branch: Imperial Japanese Army
- Type: Infantry
- Garrison/HQ: North China
- Nickname: Camp Division
- Engagements: Operation Ichi-Go; Soviet invasion of Manchuria

Commanders
- Notable commanders: Ken'ichi Kishikawa

The 63rd Division (第63師団, Dai-rokujūsan Shidan) was an infantry division of the Imperial Japanese Army. Its call sign was the Camp Division (陣兵団, Jin Heidan). It was formed on 1 May 1943 in Beijing, simultaneously with the 62nd division as a security (type C) division. The nucleus for the formation was parts of the 6th and 15th independent mixed brigades. As a security division, it lacked an artillery regiment. The men of the division were drafted from the Utsunomiya mobilization district. The division was initially assigned to the 1st army.

== Action ==
Upon formation, the 63rd division was sent to Baoding to perform garrison duties.

From 19 May 1944, the 63rd division also participated in Operation Ichi-Go, attacking Luoyang together with the 9th independent infantry brigade without much success until being rescued by the rest of the 12th army.

In June 1945, the 63rd division was relieved from front line duty and sent to Tongliao. It fought in Soviet invasion of Manchuria, ending up in eastern Mukden by the time the fighting ceased 2 September 1945 without any formal treaty.

The division personnel were mostly taken prisoner by the Soviet Union, and were confined to labour camps in Mukden, Irkutsk, Russian Turkestan and other locations. Although prisoners had started to return in November 1945, some soldiers remained in captivity, with the last of them dying in 1954.

== See also ==
- List of Japanese Infantry Divisions

== Notes ==
- This article incorporates material from Japanese Wikipedia page 第63師団 (日本軍), accessed 13 June 2016

== Reference and further reading ==
- Madej, W. Victor. Japanese Armed Forces Order of Battle, 1937-1945 [2 vols]

Allentown, PA: 1981
