= 40th Cavalry Regiment =

40th Armor Regiment 40th Cavalry Regiment
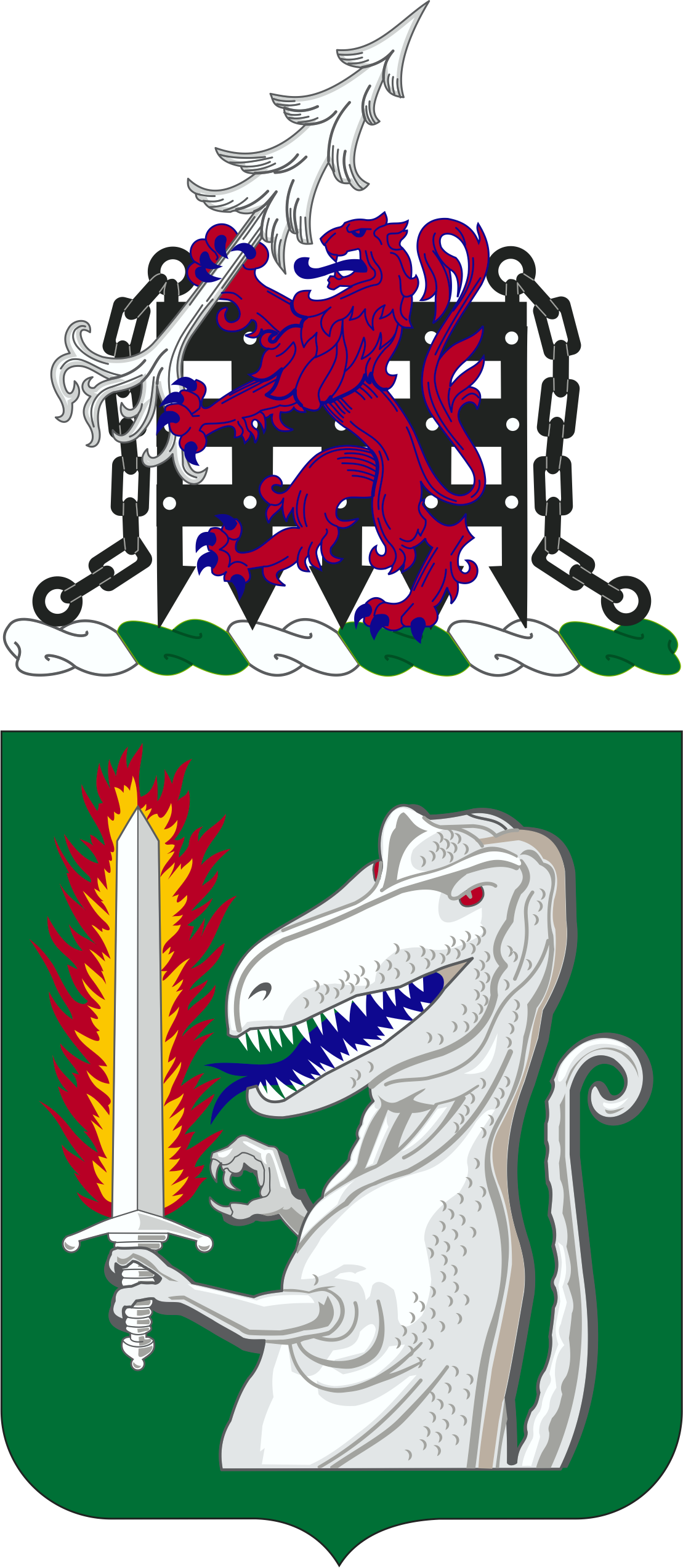
- Coat of arms
- Active: 1941–1996; 2005–2026
- Country: United States
- Branch: United States Army
- Type: Armor and cavalry
- Part of: 2nd Brigade Combat Team, 11th Airborne Division
- Mottos: By Force and Valor

Commanders
- Current commander: LTC Craig J. Nelson

Insignia
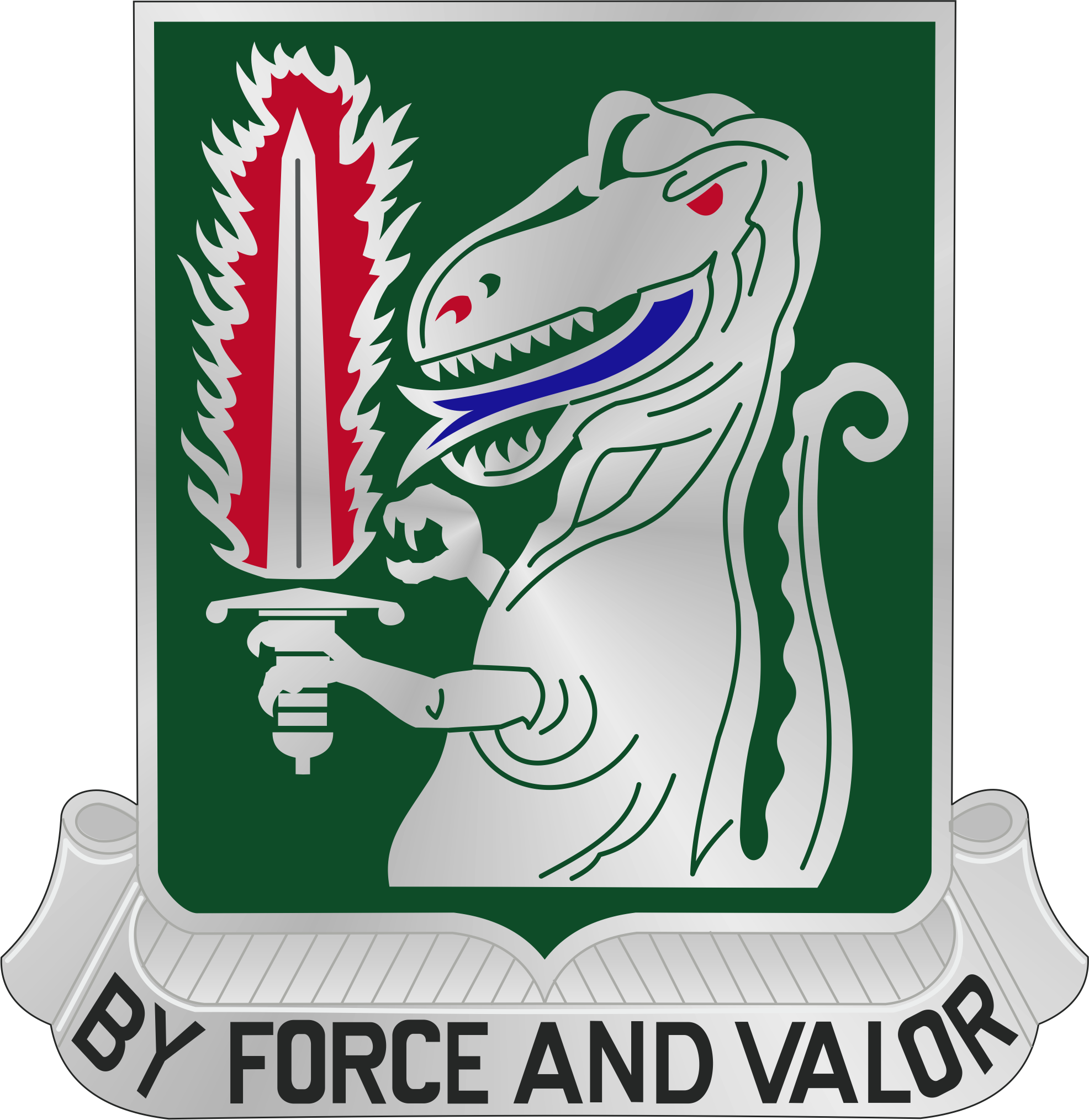
- Distinctive unit insignia

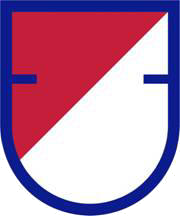
- Former beret flash of 1st Squadron, 40th Cavalry Regiment

The 40th Armor Regiment was a regiment of the Armored Branch of the United States Army until the inactivation of its last element, its 1st Battalion, in 1996. It was redesignated and reactivated in 2005 as the 40th Cavalry Regiment. Thereafter its 1st Squadron (Airborne) was assigned to the 4th Brigade (Airborne), 25th Infantry Division. In 2022 it became part of the 2nd Infantry Brigade Combat Team (Airborne), 11th Airborne Division. In 2026 it was reflagged as 1st Battalion, 511th Infantry Regiment, making 1st Squadron the last airborne cavalry formation of the U.S. Army.

== World War II ==
Constituted as the 4th Armored Regiment on 13 January 1941, the unit was retitled the 40th Armored Regiment on 8 May 1941 and then inactivated on 1 January 1942. The 40th Armored Regiment was reactivated on 2 March 1942 at Camp Polk, Louisiana and assigned to the 7th Armored Division.

The regiment moved to Fort Benning on 20 September 1943, and was divided into two tank battalions, the 40th and the 709th Tank Battalions, equipped with M4 Medium and M5 Light tanks.

The 40th Tank Battalion entered combat on 15 August 1944 fighting across northern France into Belgium, where it made a significant contribution to the defeat of German forces at St. Vith during the Battle of the Bulge. The 40th then drove into Germany linking up with the Russians on the Baltic coast. The 40th Tank Battalion received participation credit for four European campaigns from Northern France to Central Europe and was awarded the Belgian Fourragere.

The 709th Tank Battalion, which served as a separate tank battalion, entered combat in France on 11 July 1944. The battalion participated in five European campaigns from Normandy to Central Europe. The 709th was inactivated on 10 April 1946 at Camp Kilmer, New Jersey. The 709th was reactivated as the 86th Tank Battalion on 30 July 1948 joining the 3d Armored Division at Fort Knox, Kentucky. In 1953, it was redesignated as the 709th and then inactivated in Germany on 1 October 1957.

== Postwar ==
On 15 October 1957, the 40th and 709th Tank Battalions, as well as Troop E, 87th Cavalry Reconnaissance Squadron, were combined to form the 40th Armor under the Combat Arms Regimental System. Thereafter, elements of the regiment served dispersed among various army commands worldwide.

- 1st Medium Tank Battalion, 40th Armor was activated on 15 October 1957 and redesignated Company A, 40th Armor on 16 December of the same year. It was assigned to the 171st Infantry Brigade (U.S. Army Alaska) on 20 May 1963 and equipped with the M41 light tank at Ladd Air Force Base. It was inactivated on 21 September 1969. The battalion was reactivated in 1975 and was subordinated to the 5th Infantry Division, Fort Polk until it was inactivated in 1987. The battalion was reactivated in January 1996 as an experimental test battalion at Fort Hunter Liggett, California, then inactivated in September 1997.
- 2n Medium Tank Battalion, 40th Armor was activated on 1 July 1957 and subordinated to the 7th Infantry Division in Korea. The unit was inactivated on 1 July 1963. On 9 October 1963, the unit was redesignated Company B, 40th Armor. Company B, 40th Armor was activated at Fort Sill, Oklahoma, on 24 October 1963. The unit was inactivated in 1978.
- 3d Medium Tank Battalion, 40th Armor was activated on 15 October 1957 and subordinated to the 1st Cavalry Division in Korea. The unit was inactivated on 1 September 1963.
- 4th Medium Tank Battalion was formed on 15 October 1957 and redesignated Company D, 40th Armor on 16 December of the same year. The unit was subordinated to the 172nd Infantry Brigade and stationed in Alaska. Later expanded to 4th Battalion, 40th Armor from March 1976 until April 1984, and subordinated to 4th Infantry Division. It was inactivated on 1 April 1957 at Fort Lewis, Washington.
- 5th Medium Tank Battalion, 40th Armor was reconstituted on 15 October 1957, subordinated to the Sixth Army in California, and inactivated on 19 February 1962. Redesignated 5th Battalion, 40th Armor on 27 March 1963 and subordinated to the 63rd Infantry Division of the Army Reserve. The unit was inactivated on 31 December 1965.

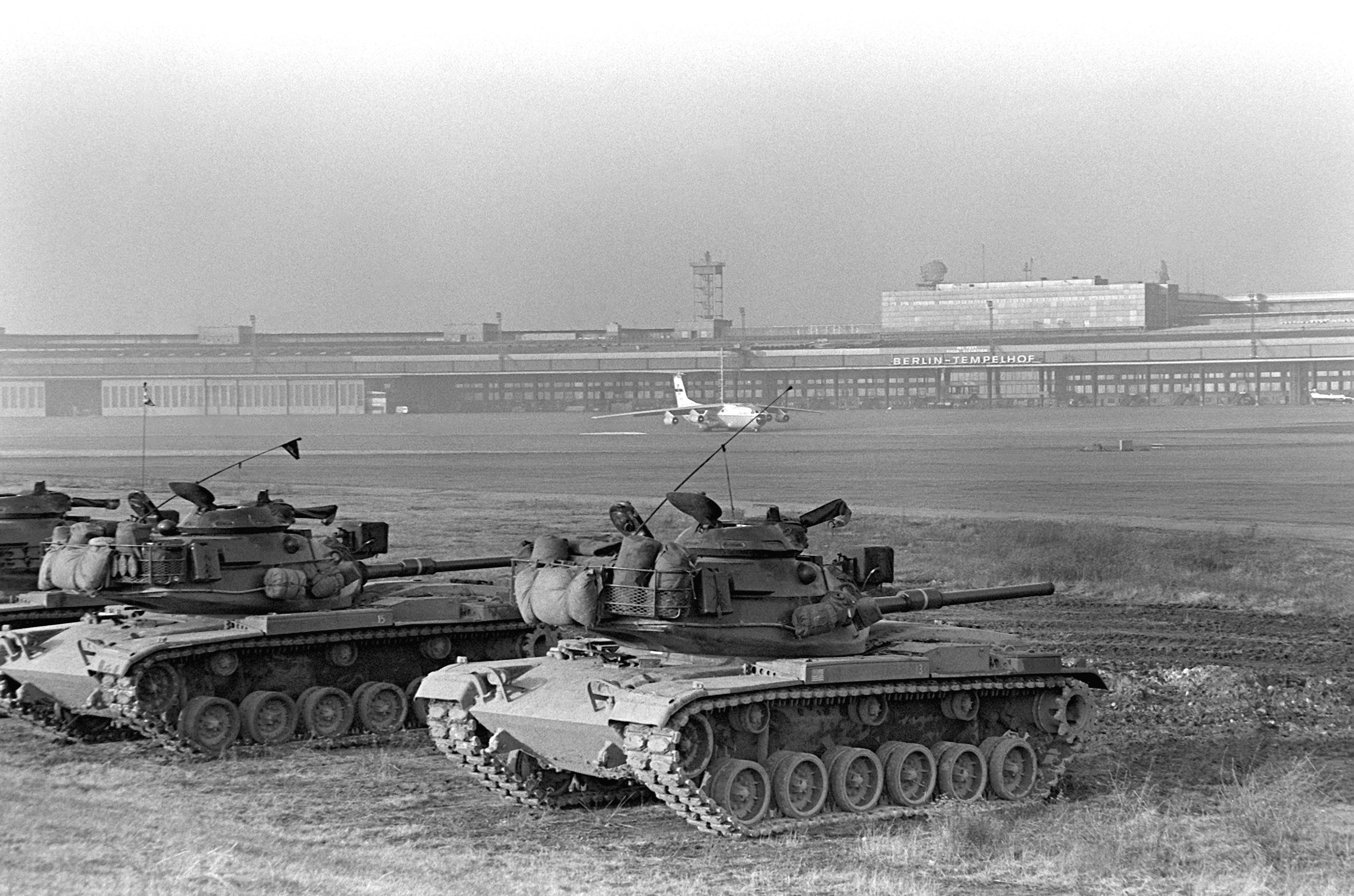
M60 main battle tanks of Co. F, 40th Armor, Berlin Bde., undergo dry firing proficiency training at Tempelhof Airport in West-Berlin. 17 december 1980.

- 6th Medium Tank Battalion, 40th Armor was reconstituted on 15 October 1957. The unit was redesignated Company F, 40th Armor on 2 May 1958 and assigned to the U.S. Army's Berlin Brigade from 1 September 1963 forward. Later it expanded to 6th Battalion, 40th Armor from September 1990 until May 1992.
- 7th Medium Tank Battalion, 40th Armor was activated on 1 May 1959. It was redesignated as the 7th Battalion, 40th Armor on 1 April 1963. Subordinated to the 63d Infantry Division and inactivated on 31 December 1965.
- 8th Medium Tank Battalion, 40th Armor was formed on 15 October 1957 and assigned on 20 May 1959 to the 96th Infantry Division of the Army Reserve. On 15 February 1963, the unit was redesignated 8th Tank Battalion, 40th Armor, and subordinated to the 191st Infantry Brigade in Arizona. Final designation was as 8th Battalion, 40th Armor on 12 September 1963. On 12 January 1994, the Tucson Citizen reported that the unit's function would be transferred to the Nevada Army National Guard. The unit had been headquartered in at the Tucson Reserve Center. The 8th Battalion's "mission will be transferred to Nevada. The battalion, with headquarters in Tucson, is slated to be shut down and its mission transferred to Nevada, according to congressional sources. Congressman Jon Kyl, R-Phoenix, said yesterday that officials associated with the 63d U.S. Army Reserve Command briefed members of the 8/40 over the weekend and, for the first time, informed members of the unit that it will be deactivated. Kyl said mission functions, but not personnel, from the armored unit are set to be transferred to the Nevada National Guard. Kyl said Pentagon officials indicated the deactivation will take effect in 1997. Closure of the 8/40 could result in the loss of 642 Army Reserve positions in Arizona. The unit has companies in Phoenix and Fort Huachuca that also would be closed under the plan. The unit inactivated in September 1996.

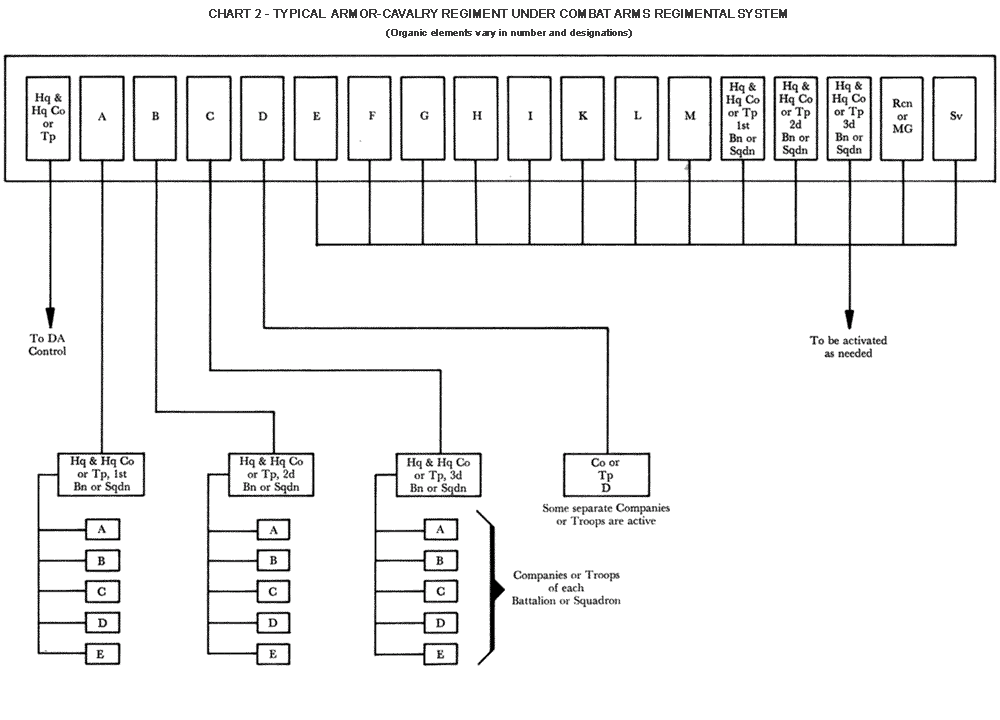

== Twenty-first century ==
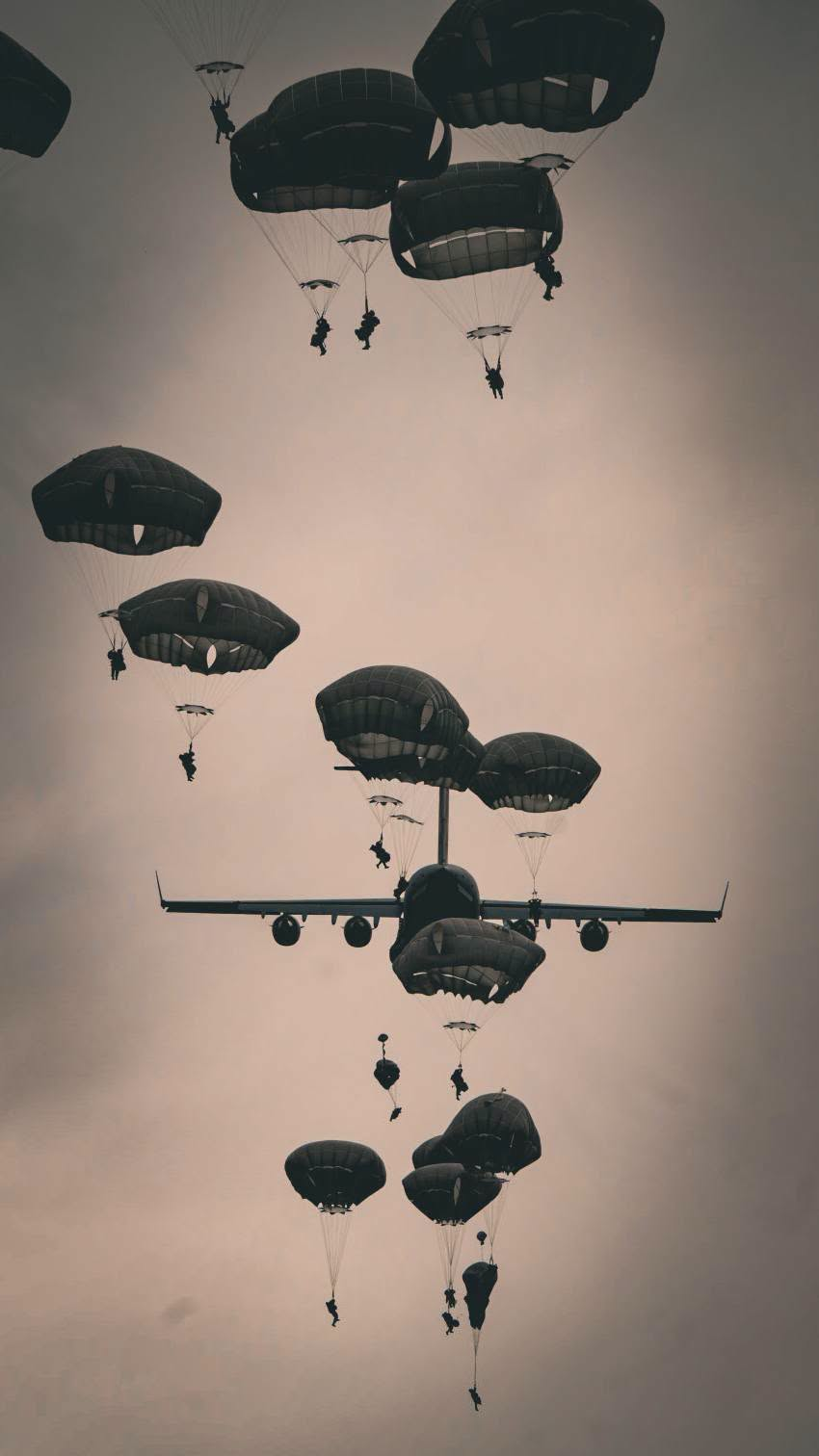
1st Squadron, 40th Cavalry Regiment cement their place in history as the last active airborne cavalry squadron in the US Army by conducting a parachute incursion at Malemute Drop Zone, Alaska (16 July 2026)

In 2005, the 40th Armor was redesignated as the 40th Cavalry. The former Company A, 40th Armor was reorganized and redesignated as Headquarters and Headquarters Troop, 1st Squadron (Airborne), 40th Cavalry Regiment (organic elements constituted). The 1st Squadron was assigned to the 4th Brigade Combat Team (Airborne), 25th Infantry Division and activated on 16 October 2005 at Joint Base Elmendorf-Richardson, Alaska.

In October 2006, 1st Squadron, 40th Cavalry Regiment (Airborne) conducted its first deployment as part of the 4th Brigade Combat Team (Airborne) in support of Operation Iraqi Freedom. The 1-40 Cavalry Regiment conducted 14 months of counterinsurgency operation throughout Southern Baghdad including leading a decisive effort during the Iraq troop surge of 2007. For extraordinary heroism in action against an armed enemy 1st Squadron, 40th Cavalry Regiment was awarded the Valorous Unit Award. In December 2007, the unit redeployed back to Joint Base Elmendorf-Richardson.

In February 2009, 1st Squadron deployed to Afghanistan in support of Operation Enduring Freedom conducting counterinsurgency operations across Paktia Province in partnership with Afghan Security Forces. In November 2009, the unit deployed to Western Khost partnering with 1st Brigade, 203rd Corps of the Afghan Army bringing increased stability to the Western districts. The squadron was awarded the Meritorious Unit Commendation. In February 2010, 1-40 Cavalry Regiment redeployed back to Joint Base Elmendorf-Richardson.

In December 2011, 1st Squadron (Airborne), 40th Cavalry Regiment deployed back to Paktia and Khost Provinces in Afghanistan in support of Operation Enduring Freedom. After a successful mission, partnering with the Afghan National Army, the Squadron increased stability in the region for a successful future. For exceptionally Meritorious Service, 1st Squadron, 40th Cavalry Regiment was awarded the Meritorious Unit Commendation. In October 2012, the unit redeployed back to Joint Base Elmendorf-Richardson.

On July 17th, 2026, 1st Squadron cased its colors and was reflagged to 1st Battalion (Airborne), 511th Infantry Regiment in an effort to further the 11th Airborne Division modernization initiative.

== Bibliography ==
- Timothy Aumiller, United States Army Infantry, Armor/Cavalry, Artillery Battalions 1957–2011, Takoma Park: Tiger Lily Publications, 2008. ISBN 978-0-9776072-3-5.
- Mary L. Stubbs and Stanley R. Connor, Army Lineage Series Armor-Cavalry Part I: Regular Army and Army Reserve, Washington D.C.: GPO, 1969.
