= Long gun =

Firearms with longer barrels and length

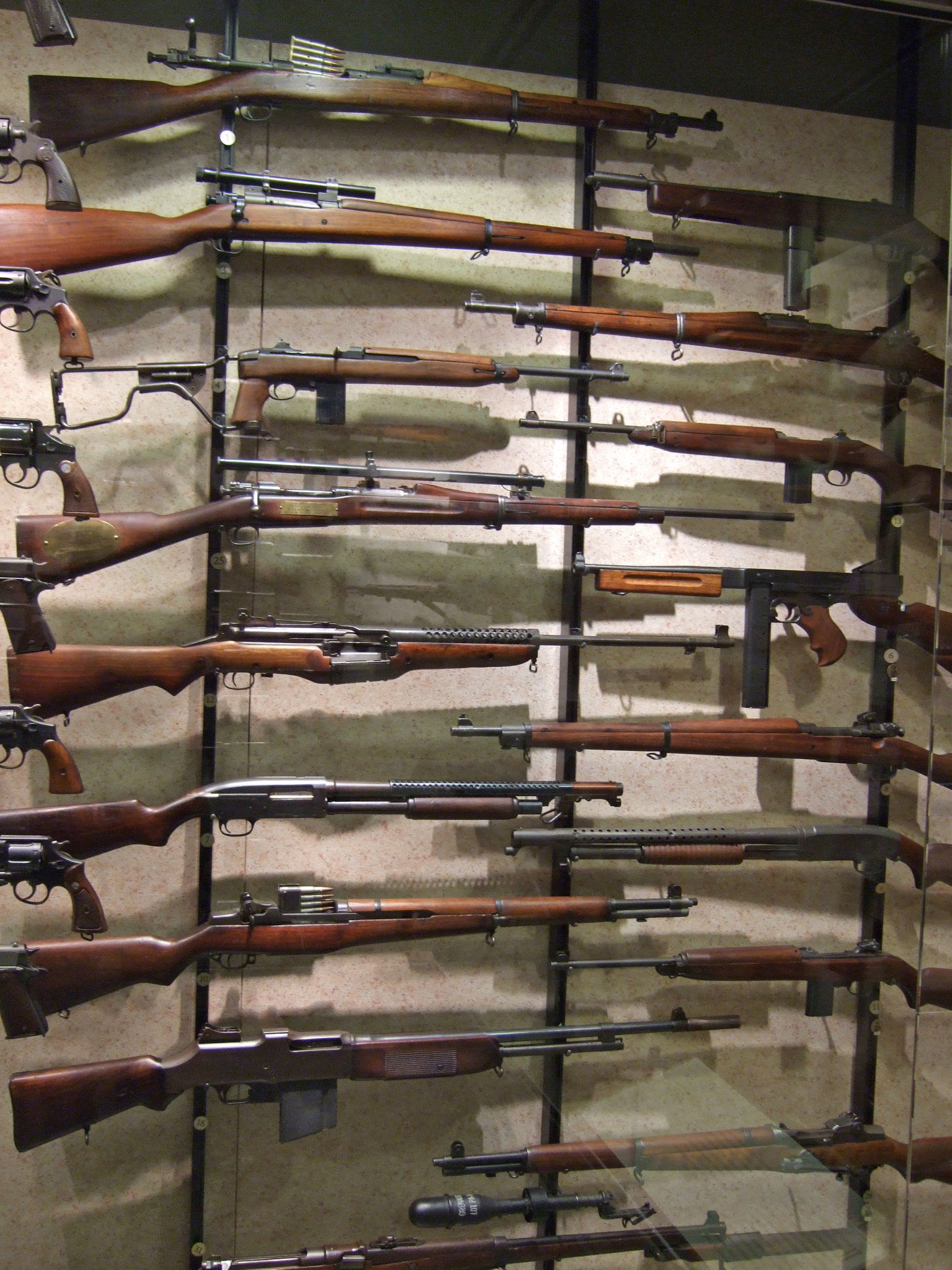
Various long guns used by the United States military during World War II, including rifles, carbines, submachine guns, and shotguns. In contrast, partially visible to the left are various handguns.

A long gun is a category of firearms with long barrels. In small arms, a long gun or longarm is generally designed to be held by both hands and braced against the shoulder, in contrast to a handgun, which can be fired being held with a single hand. In the context of cannons and mounted firearms, an artillery long gun would be contrasted with a field gun or howitzer.

== Small arms ==
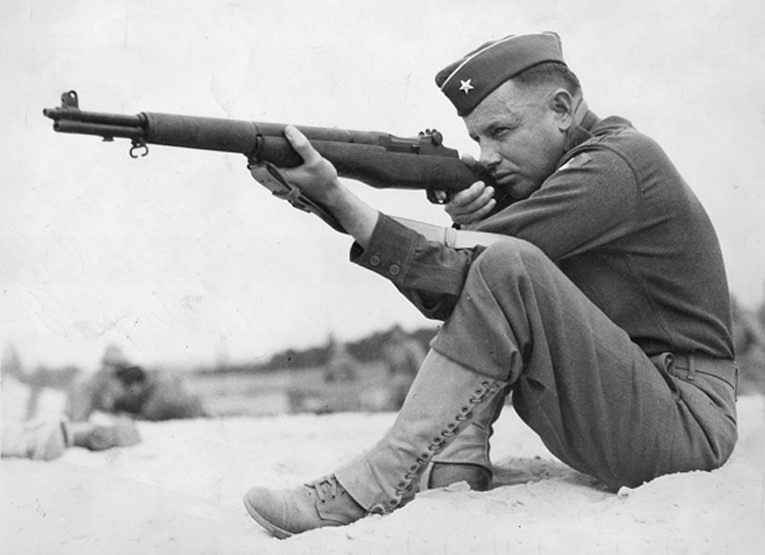
U.S. Army Brigadier General Claudius Miller Easley practicing with an M1 Garand ca. 1942–1945

The actual length of the barrels of a long gun is subject to various laws in many jurisdictions, mainly concerning minimum length, sometimes as measured in a specific position or configuration. The National Firearms Act in the United States sets a minimum length of 16 inches (41 cm) for rifle barrels and 18 inches (46 cm) for shotgun barrels. Canada sets a minimum of 18.5 inches (47 cm) for either. In addition, Canada sets a minimum fireable length for long guns with detachable or folding stocks 26 inches (66 cm). In the United States, the minimum length for long guns with detachable or folding stocks is 26 inches (66 cm) with the stock in the extended position.

Examples of various classes of small arms generally considered long arms include, but are not limited to shotguns, personal defense weapons, submachine guns, carbines, assault rifles, designated marksman rifles, sniper rifles, anti-materiel rifles, light machine guns, medium machine guns, and heavy machine guns.

=== Advantages and disadvantages ===
Almost all long arms have front grips (forearms) and shoulder stocks, which provide the user the ability to hold the firearm more steadily than a handgun. In addition, the long barrel of a long gun usually provides a longer distance between the front and rear sights, providing the user with more precision when aiming. The presence of a stock makes the use of a telescopic sight or red dot sight easier than with a handgun.

The mass of a long gun is usually greater than that of a handgun, making the long gun more expensive to transport, and more difficult and tiring to carry. The increased moment of inertia makes the long gun slower and more difficult to traverse and elevate, and it is thus slower and more difficult to adjust the aim. However, this also results in greater stability in aiming. The greater amount of material in a long gun tends to make it more expensive to manufacture, other factors being equal. The greater size makes it more difficult to conceal, and more inconvenient to use in confined quarters, as well as requiring larger storage space.

As long guns include a stock that is braced against the shoulder, the recoil when firing is transferred directly into the body of the user. This allows better control of aim than handguns, which do not include stock, and thus all their recoil must be transferred to the arms of the user. It also makes it possible to manage larger amounts of recoil without damage or loss of control; in combination with the higher mass of long guns, this means more propellant (such as gunpowder) can be used and thus larger projectiles can be fired at higher velocities. This is one of the main reasons for the use of long guns over handguns—faster or heavier projectiles help with penetration and accuracy over longer distances.

Shotguns are long guns that are designed to fire many small projectiles at once. This makes them very effective at close ranges, but with diminished usefulness at long ranges, even with shotgun slugs they are mostly only effective to about 100 yd (91 m).

== Naval long guns ==
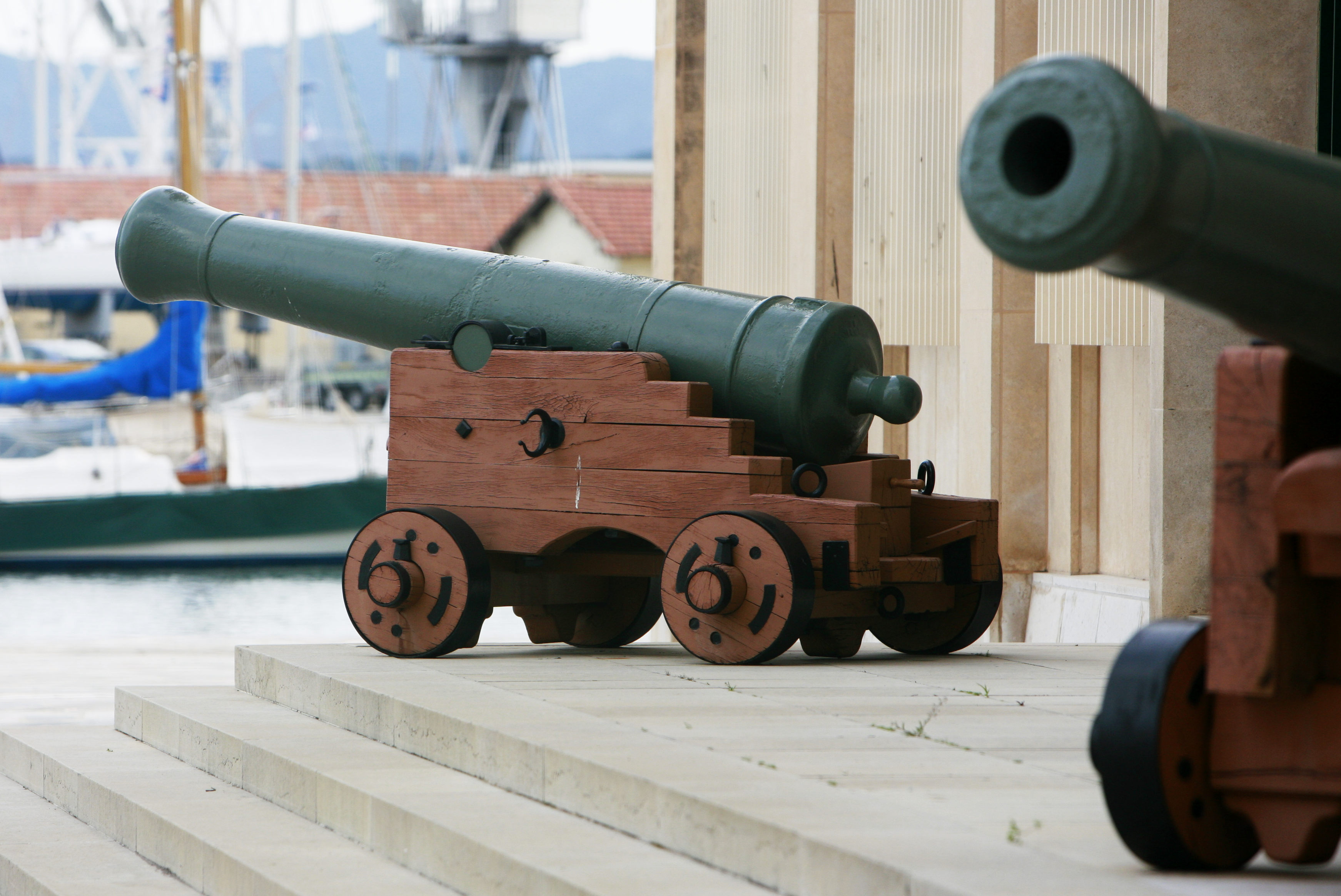
Long guns on display in front of the Préfecture maritime in Toulon

In historical navy usage, a long gun was the standard type of cannon mounted by a sailing vessel, called such to distinguish it from the much shorter carronades. In informal usage, the length was combined with the weight of the shot, yielding terms like "long 9s", referring to full-length cannons firing a 9-pound round shot.

== See also ==
- Large-calibre artillery
- Java arquebus, a long firearm
