= 59th Infantry Regiment (United States) =

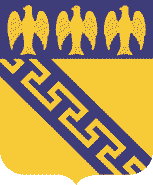
- Coat of arms
- Active: 1917-1968
- Country: United States
- Branch: United States Army
- Type: Infantry
- Motto: "Let 'em Have It"

Insignia
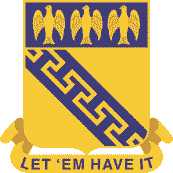
- Distinctive unit insignia

The 59th Infantry Regiment was a regiment of the United States Army first established in 1917.

It appears that the last remaining element of the regiment, 1st Battalion, 59th Infantry, was part of the 191st Infantry Brigade until 1968. The 191st Infantry Brigade inactivated in 1968 and the last element of the 59th Infantry was inactivated as well at that time.

== History ==
The 59th Infantry, organized in 1917 by transfer of men from the 4th Infantry Regiment, saw hard fighting as a part of the 4th Division in Champaign in the Aisne-Marne engagement, in Lorraine at St Mihiel and at the Meuse-Argonne. In the Aisne-Marne offensive the regiment did gallant service against the Chateau-de-Diable north of the Vesle River. In this action "a squad of machine gunners, in woolen olive drab uniforms were sighted approaching the flank of the 59th from the direction of the Chateau-de-Diable. Cautioned by one of his men that the approaching men were American the sergeant commanding the flank platoon yelled, 'They come from the wrong direction, let 'em have it.' The dead men were later identified as Germans in American uniforms." The 59th Infantry arrived at the port of New York in August 1919 and was transferred to Camp Merritt, New Jersey. Transferred in August 1919 to Camp Dodge, Iowa. Transferred in January 1920 to Camp Lewis, Washington. Transferred in September 1922 to Vancouver Barracks, Washington. Concurrently, the 2nd Battalion was transferred to Fort William H. Seward, Territory of Alaska. The regiment was demobilized (disbanded) on 28 September 1922 at Vancouver Barracks and its personnel and equipment were transferred to the 7th Infantry Regiment.

During World War II, the 59th Armored Infantry Battalion formed part of the 13th Armored Division from its activation on 15 October 1942, serving alongside the 16th and 67th Armored Infantry Battalions. The division entered combat in March 1945 and fought in the Rhineland and Central Europe campaigns.

In April 1945, the 59th Armored Infantry Battalion, operating with Combat Command B of the 13th Armored Division, fought through the Battle of the Ruhr, securing bridgeheads and advancing through Dunnwald and Mettmann amid artillery, mortar, small-arms, and anti-tank fire while capturing prisoners and liberating civilians. After the Ruhr pocket was defeated, it advanced southeast across the Danube near Moosham and the Isar at Plattling, fought through Osterhofen and Malgersdorf, crossed the Inn river at Eisenfelden on 2 May, and completed the operations covered by its report at Neuötting on 4 May 1945.

== Coat of arms ==
The coat of arms was originally approved for the 59th Infantry Regiment, Organized Reserves on 10 Sep 1921. It was amended on 18 Nov 1921 to correct the wording of the blazon. It was redesignated for the 59th Armored Infantry Regiment on 8 Jul 1943. On 30 Nov 1943 the coat of arms was redesignated for the 59th Armored Infantry Battalion. It was amended on 26 Oct 1951. On 16 Jun 1952 it was redesignated for the 59th Infantry Regiment, Organized Reserves. The coat of arms was amended on 24 Sep 1959 to withdraw "Organized Reserves" from the designation and to delete the Organized Reserves' crest. On 5 Aug 1970 it was amended to reinstate the crest of the Army Reserves and revise the symbolism.

== Lineage ==
Constituted 15 May 1917 in the Regular Army as the 59th Infantry. Organized 8 June 1917 at Gettysburg National Park, Pennsylvania from personnel of the 4th Infantry Regiment. Assigned to the 4th Infantry Division 19 November 1917. Relieved from the 4th Division and demobilized 28 September 1922. Reconstituted in the Regular Army as the 59th Armored Infantry and assigned to the 13th Armored Division 7 July 1942. Activated 15 October 1942 at Camp Beale, California. Regiment broken up 20 September 1943 and its elements reorganized as elements of the 13th Armored Division and redesignated as follows:

- 59th Armored Infantry (less 1st and 2d Battalions) as the 59th Armored Infantry Battalion.
- 1st Battalion as the 67th Armored Infantry Battalion.
- 2d Battalion as the 16th Armored Infantry Battalion.

Battalions inactivated at Camp Cooke, California 9–12 November 1945. Withdrawn from the Regular Army and allotted to the Organized Reserve Corps 8 August 1947.

- 59th Armored Infantry Battalion activated 21 August 1947 with headquarters at Phoenix, Arizona.
- 67th Armored Infantry Battalion activated 23 March 1948 at Los Angeles, California.
- 16th Armored Infantry Battalion activated 22 January 1948 with headquarters at Tucson, Arizona.

16th, 67th, and 59th Armored Infantry Battalions consolidated to form the 59th Infantry 22 February 1952. Relieved from the 13th Armored Division, assigned to the 96th Infantry Division and reorganized 1 March 1952 with headquarters at Phoenix. Reorganized 20 May 1959 as the 59th Infantry, a parent regiment under the Combat Arms Regimental System.

== Campaign streamers ==
World War I

- Aisne-Marne
- St. Mihiel
- Meuse-Argonne
- Lorraine 1918
- Champagne 1918

World War II

- Rhineland
- Central Europe
