= Ray D. Free =

American soldier and politician (1910–2002)

- Born: January 4, 1910; Weston, Idaho, United States
- Died: August 9, 2002 (aged 92); Salt Lake City, Utah, United States
- Spouse: Louise Wilken
- Children: 6
- Military career
- Allegiance: United States
- Branch: United States Army
- Service years: 1936–1970
- Rank: Major General
- Unit: 7th Infantry Division
- Commands: 96th Army Reserve Command
- Awards: Purple Heart
- Other work: member of the Utah House of Representatives

Ray DuChene Free (January 4, 1910 – August 9, 2002) was a major general in the U.S. Army Reserves, business owner, and a Republican member of the Utah House of Representatives.

== Personal life ==
Free was born in Weston, Idaho, to J. Roy and Jennie DuChene Free. He graduated from the University of Utah in 1932, where he was a member of Sigma Pi fraternity. After graduation, he received his commission in the army and spent a year as a missionary for the Church of Jesus Christ of Latter-day Saints in Europe. When he returned from Europe he married Louise Wilken on June 26, 1935. They had six children, five boys and one girl.

== Military career ==
Free began his military career in the artillery corps in 1936 as a Second Lieutenant. He graduated from the Career Artillery Course and the Command and General Staff College in the late 1930s. He served with the Seventh "Bayonet" Division during World War II in the Pacific Theater where he received the Purple Heart.

He joined the Army Reserve after the war. On March 3, 1964, he was promoted to brigadier general and assigned command of the 96th Army Reserve Command in Ft. Douglas, Utah. He was promoted to Major General on September 12, 1968. In December 1968, he became Deputy Chief of the Office of Reserve Components, USAR. In 1969, he was elected national president of the Reserve Officers Association.

== Other activities ==
As a reserve officer, Free had the time to be active outside of the military. He owned and operated Hygeia Ice Company and Carbo Chemical Company for over forty years and served as president of Granite National Bank. He was a member of the Great Salt Lake Council of the Boy Scouts of America. He also served as president of the Sugar House Rotary Club and district governor of the Utah and Idaho clubs.

In 1953, he was chairman of the committee that investigated the Utah State Prison riot that happened earlier that year. He wrote the committee's findings in what would become known as the Free Report.

He later served as a member of the Utah House of Representatives for ten years (1979–89). In 1986, Free led a large group of Utah legislators who supported Free's resolution proposing to add the concept of "responsibility" to the Pledge of Allegiance.

== Death and legacy ==
He died in Salt Lake City in 2002.
