= 171st Infantry Brigade (United States) =

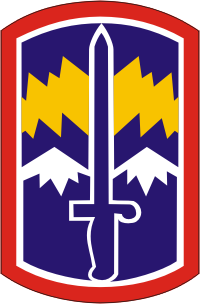
- 171st Infantry Brigade shoulder sleeve insignia
- Active: 5 August 1917–January 1919 (National Army); 24 June 1921–30 December 1946 (various designations); 20 May 1963–13 November 1972; 16 March 2007–10 June 2016
- Country: United States
- Branch: United States Army
- Type: Infantry
- Role: Training support
- Size: Brigade
- Garrison/HQ: Fort Jackson, South Carolina
- Engagements: World War I; World War II; Central Europe

Insignia
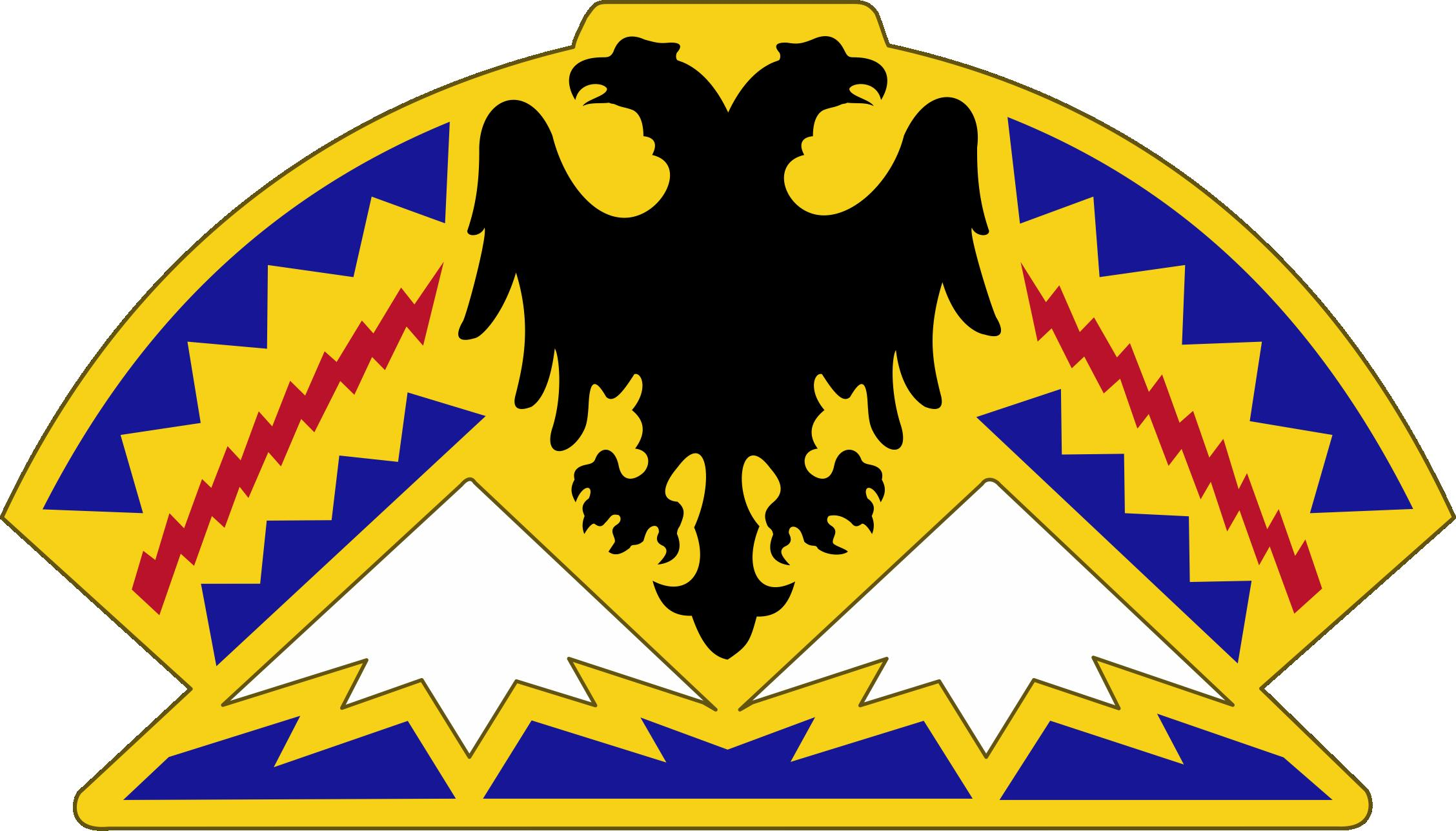
- 171st Infantry Brigade DUI

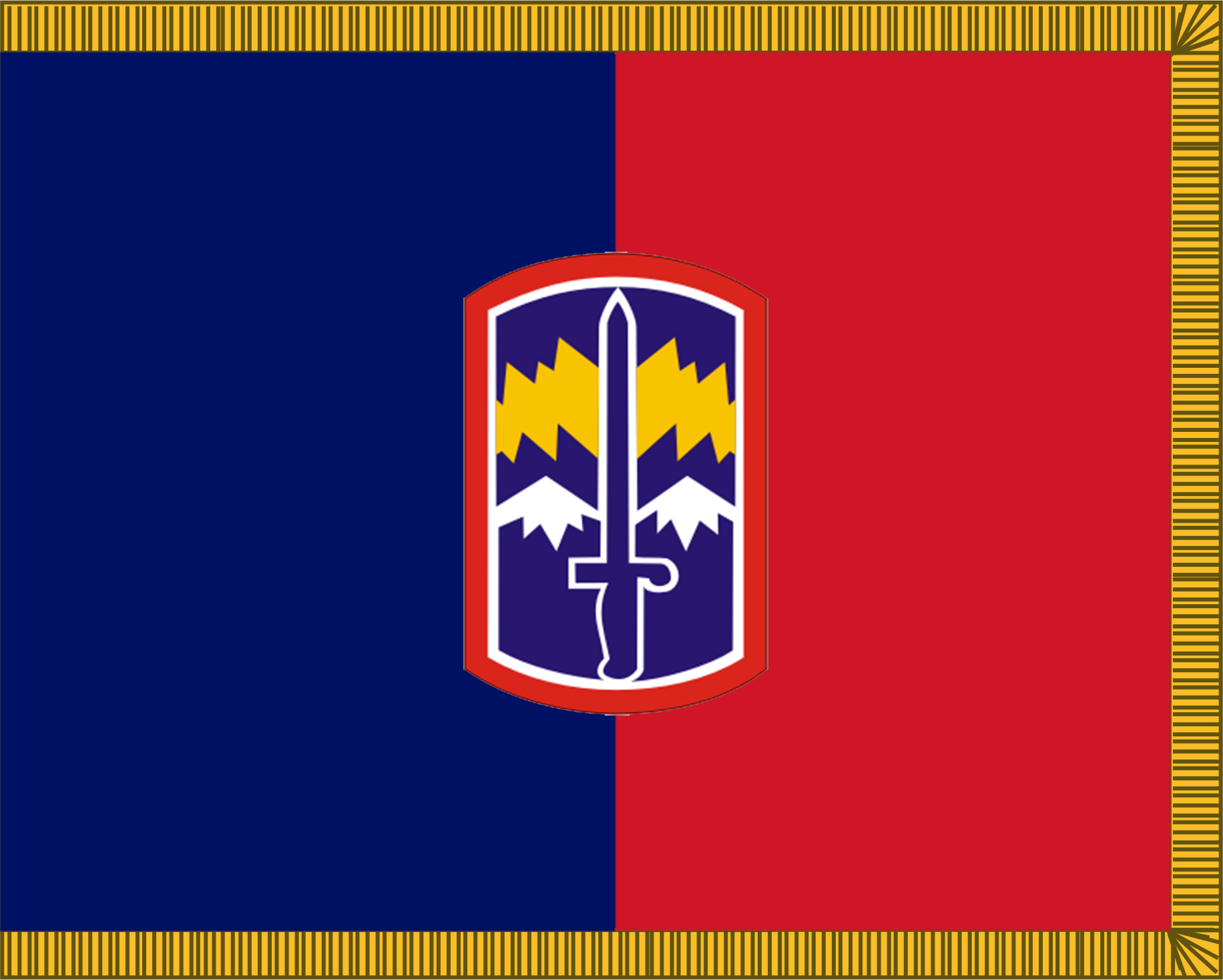
- 171st Infantry Brigade Flag

The 171st Infantry Brigade was an infantry brigade of the United States Army based at Fort Jackson, South Carolina. With a long history of serving, the brigade saw action during both World War I and World War II before it was inactivated in 1946. During the Cold War (in 1963) the brigade was once again activated for a period of ten years until again inactivated in 1972. In 2007 the brigade was reactivated as a training support unit and inactivated on 10 June 2016.

== History ==
=== World War I ===
Constituted 5 August 1917 in the National Army as Headquarters, 171st Infantry Brigade, and assigned to the 86th Division. Organized 3 September 1917 at Camp Grant in Rockford, Illinois. Demobilized in January 1919 at Camp Grant, Illinois. Reconstituted 24 June 1921 in the Organized Reserves as Headquarters and headquarters Company, 171st Infantry Brigade, and assigned to the 86th Division. organized in July 1922 at Chicago, Illinois. Redesignated 23 March 1925 as Headquarters and Headquarters Company, 171st Brigade. Redesignated 24 August 1936 as Headquarters and Headquarters Company, 171st Infantry Brigade. Composition 1917-1936

- Headquarters Company
- 341st Infantry Regiment
- 342nd Infantry Regiment
- 332nd Machine Gun Battalion

=== World War II ===
Converted and redesignated 31 March 1942 as the 86th Reconnaissance Troop (less 3d Platoon), 86th Division (Headquarters and Headquarters Company, 172d Infantry Brigade, concurrently converted and redesignated as the 3d Platoon, 86th Reconnaissance Troop, 86th Division). Troop ordered into active military service 15 December 1942 and reorganized at Camp Howze, Texas, as the 86th Cavalry Reconnaissance Troop, an element of the 86th Infantry Division. Reorganized and redesignated 5 August 1943 as the 86th Reconnaissance Troop, Mechanized. Reorganized and redesignated 10 October 1945 as the 86th Mechanized Reconnaissance Troop. Inactivated 30 December 1946 in the Philippine Islands. (Organized Reserves redesignated 25 March 1948 as the Organized Reserve Corps; redesignated 9 July 1952 as the Army Reserve.)

=== Cold War ===
Converted and redesignated (less 3d Platoon) 20 May 1963 as Headquarters and Headquarters Company, 171st Infantry Brigade, and relieved from assignment to the 86th Infantry Division; concurrently withdrawn from the Army Reserve and allotted to the Regular Army (3d Platoon, 86th Reconnaissance Troop – hereafter separate lineage). Brigade activated 1 July 1963 at Fort Wainwright in Fairbanks, Alaska. Inactivated 13 November 1972 in Alaska.

While in Alaska included elements of the 40th Armor Regiment.

In 1964-1966 the 171st Infantry Brigade (Mechanized) included A Co, 40th Armor, 4th battalion, 9th inf: 1st battalion, 47th Infantry 15th field artillery, 171st transportation, (helicopters) and 171st support battalion. In 1966 the 4th battalion, 9th infantry deployed to Vietnam. The 559th Engineer Company (Combat) was also a part of the 171st Infantry Brigade (M). In 1968 the 559th was commanded by Major William D. Anderson, who, after being assigned to South Vietnam was succeeded by the most capable Captain Peter V. B. Marshalk.

Although the 171st Infantry is now located in Fort Jackson, SC, the patch depicts the a sword with mountains of the Alaskan range and the Northern Lights. A similar patch of the 172nd Inf Brigade depicts the sword, mountains, and the constellation "Big Dipper."

The 171st Infantry Brigade was assigned to Fort Wainwright AK, near Fairbanks. Its primary mission was to defend Eielson AFB. The 172nd Inf Brigade was near Anchorage, AK and its primary mission was to defend Elmendorf AFB. Both brigades trained to fight under arctic conditions.

=== Post-Cold War ===
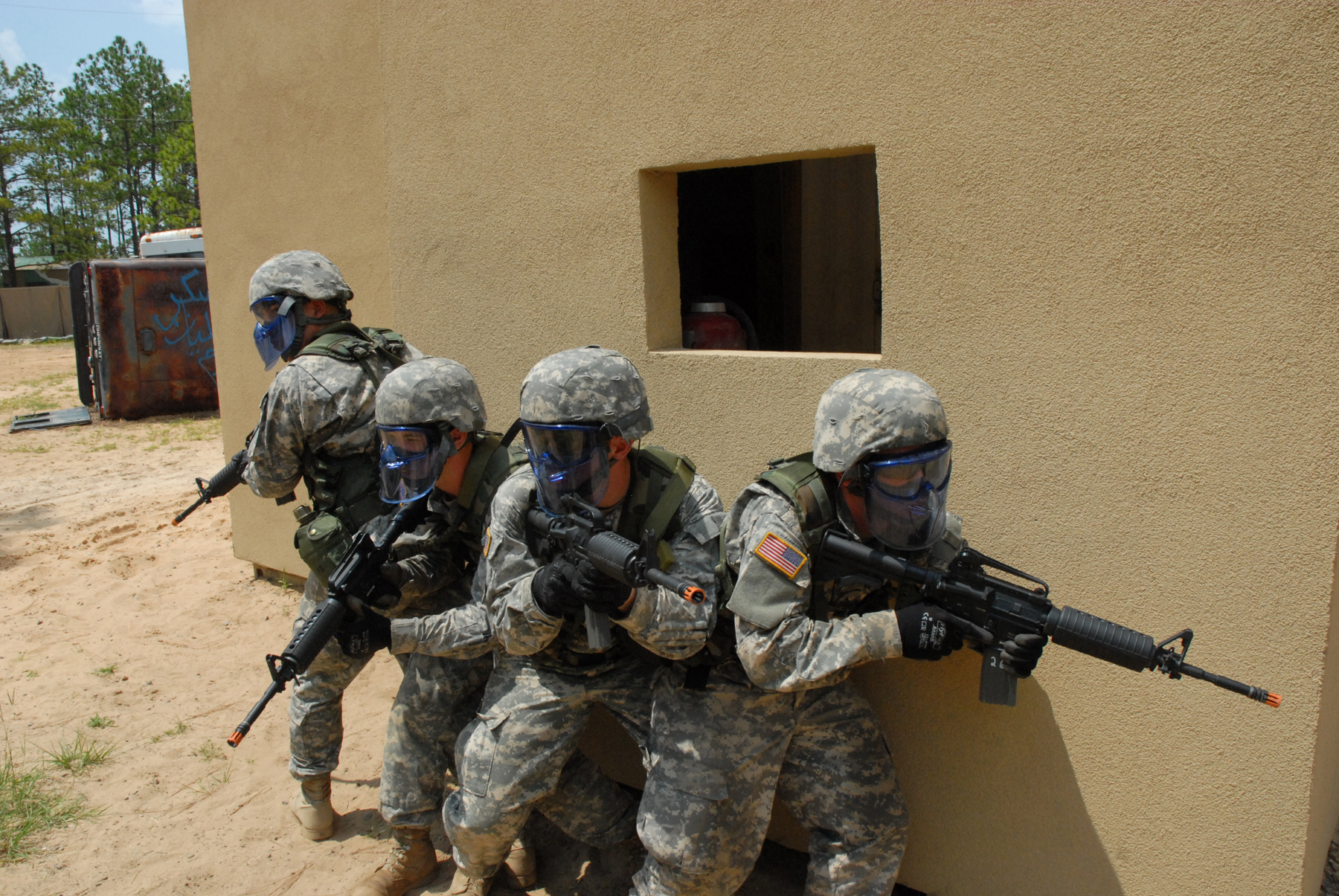
Some soldiers assigned to the 187th Ordnance Battalion are training

On 16 March 2007, the 171st Infantry Brigade was reactivated at Fort Jackson, South Carolina with the mission to support training resulting in the transformation of civilians into American soldiers. On 10 June 2016, as part of the overall drawdown of the Army, the brigade was inactivated in a ceremony at Fort Jackson, with subordinate units being inactivated or reassigned to other commands.

- Headquarters & Headquarters Company
- 4th Battalion, 10th Infantry Regiment (reflagged as Special Troops Battalion on 1 October 2014; concurrent with the inactivation of the brigade, the STB was reassigned to the US Army Garrison)
  - Family Readiness and Support
  - HHC ATC
  - Company B (Ranges)
  - USA Student Detachment
  - 17th Military Police Detachment
  - 282d Army Band
- 120th Adjutant General Battalion (reassigned to the 193rd Infantry Brigade)
- 187th Ordnance Battalion (inactivated in 2015)
- Drill Sergeant School
- Task Force Marshall

== Campaign participation credit ==
- World War I (Streamer without inscription)
- World War II
  - Central Europe
