= Claudius Miller Easley =

US Army general (1891–1945)

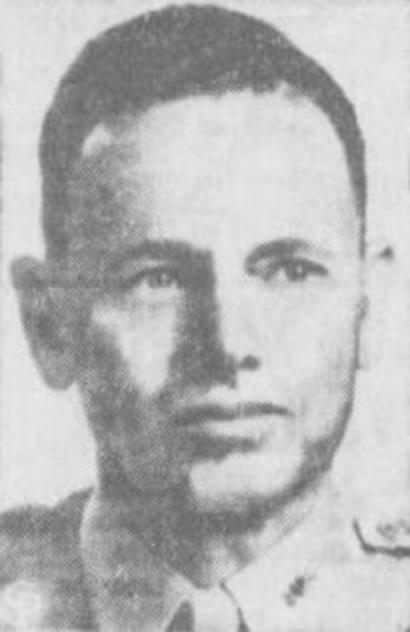
- Born: July 11, 1891; Thorp Spring, Texas, United States
- Died: June 19, 1945 (aged 53); Okinawa, Empire of Japan
- Military career
- Allegiance: United States
- Branch: United States Army
- Service years: 1910–1945
- Rank: Brigadier General
- Nickname: "Speck"
- Unit: Infantry Branch
- Commands: 325th Glider Infantry Regiment
- Conflicts: Pancho Villa Expedition; World War II: Pacific War; Battle of Okinawa †
- Awards: Silver Star; Legion of Merit; Bronze Star; Purple Heart (2)

Brigadier General Claudius Miller Easley (July 11, 1891 – June 19, 1945) was a decorated United States Army officer who was killed in action by the Japanese during the Battle of Okinawa.

== Early life and military career ==
Claudius Miller Easley was born on July 11, 1891, in the small village of Thorp Spring, Hood County, Texas as the eldest son of Alexander Campbell Easley and his wife Claudia Miller. When Easley was four years old his family moved to Waco, Texas. Easley attended the local Waco High School, where he graduated in 1911. During his time at high school, Easley enlisted in the Texas National Guard and participated in the National Matches rifle marksmanship competition at Camp Perry in Ohio in 1910. He was later commissioned as an officer, with the rank of second lieutenant in the Infantry Branch on July 11, 1912, his 21st birthday.

Easley subsequently attended the Agricultural and Mechanical College of Texas and graduated in 1916 with a Bachelor of Science degree in Architectural Engineering. Upon graduating from college, Easley went into active service in the United States Army. He first served with the Texas Army National Guard on the Mexican Border, during which period he met his future wife, Inez Wickline of Woodville, Texas. They were married in 1917 in Kansas City, Missouri, and had one son, Claudius M. Easley, Jr. Easley was subsequently commissioned in the Regular Army in 1917, shortly after the American entry into World War I. Easley did not see service in a theatre of war due to border patrol duties with the 37th Infantry Regiment during the remainder of World War I.

== Between the wars ==
Easley was then sent to the U.S. Army Infantry School at Fort Benning, Georgia, where he graduated from the Advanced Infantry Course in 1919.

In 1921, Easley was transferred to the Philippines, where he was assigned to the 31st Infantry Regiment, then stationed at Fort William McKinley. He served a three-year tour of duty in Manila, before he returned to the United States. He also attended the U.S. Army Command and General Staff School at Fort Leavenworth, Kansas in 1925. He was subsequently assigned to the 4th Infantry Regiment at Fort George Wright, Washington. It was followed by short period of duties with the 30th Infantry Regiment at Presidio of San Francisco, California.

In 1930, he was appointed an Instructor in the Weapons Section of the U.S. Army Infantry School at Fort Benning, Georgia and served in this capacity until 1934. He was later appointed a commander of the Los Angeles District of the Civilian Conservation Corps. As an avid and experienced marksman, Easley served as Captain of the Infantry Rifle and Pistol Teams during the years 1937-1939. He was subsequently ordered for studies at U.S. Army War College in Washington, D.C. and graduated in 1940.

== World War II ==
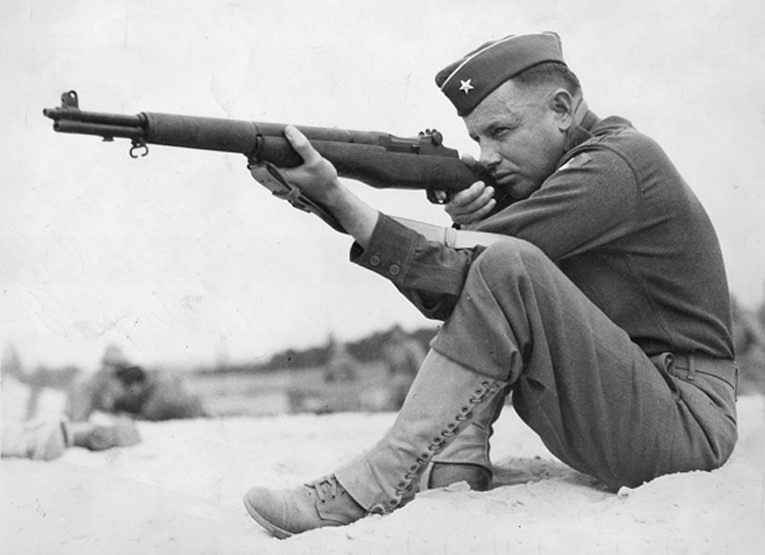
Easley with an M1 Garand

After his graduation, Easley remained in Washington, D.C., because he was assigned to the War Department General Staff, where he was responsible for the Storage Section of Requirements and Distribution branch of the Supply Division. He stayed there until February 1942, when he was transferred to Camp Claiborne, Louisiana, where he was appointed as commander of the 325th Infantry Regiment, which later became the 325th Glider Infantry Regiment when the regiment's parent formation, the 82nd Infantry Division under Major General Omar Bradley, became the U.S. Army's first airborne division and was redesignated the 82nd Airborne Division.

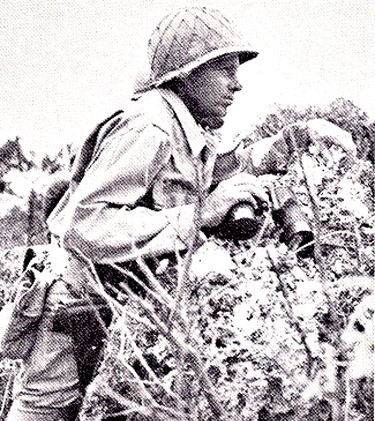
The last known photograph of Brigadier General Easley in Okinawa, taken about two hours before he was killed in action

In September 1942 Easley was transferred to Camp Adair, Oregon, where he was appointed Assistant Division Commander (ADC) of the 96th Infantry Division, commanded by Major General James L. Bradley. He was also promoted to the one-star general officer rank of brigadier general.

Brigadier General Easley personally supervised the 96th Division's marksmanship training and helped to keep the high level of marksmanship. Thus division gained the nickname "Deadeyes". Easley also participated in the Oregon Maneuver during the fall of 1943. The 96th Division was sent to Hawaiian Islands in July 1944 for preparation for landing in Philippines. Brigadier General Easley subsequently went ashore during the Battle of Leyte and was wounded by enemy sniper fire. He was later decorated with the Legion of Merit for meritorious conduct and leadership and the Bronze Star for gallantry in action.

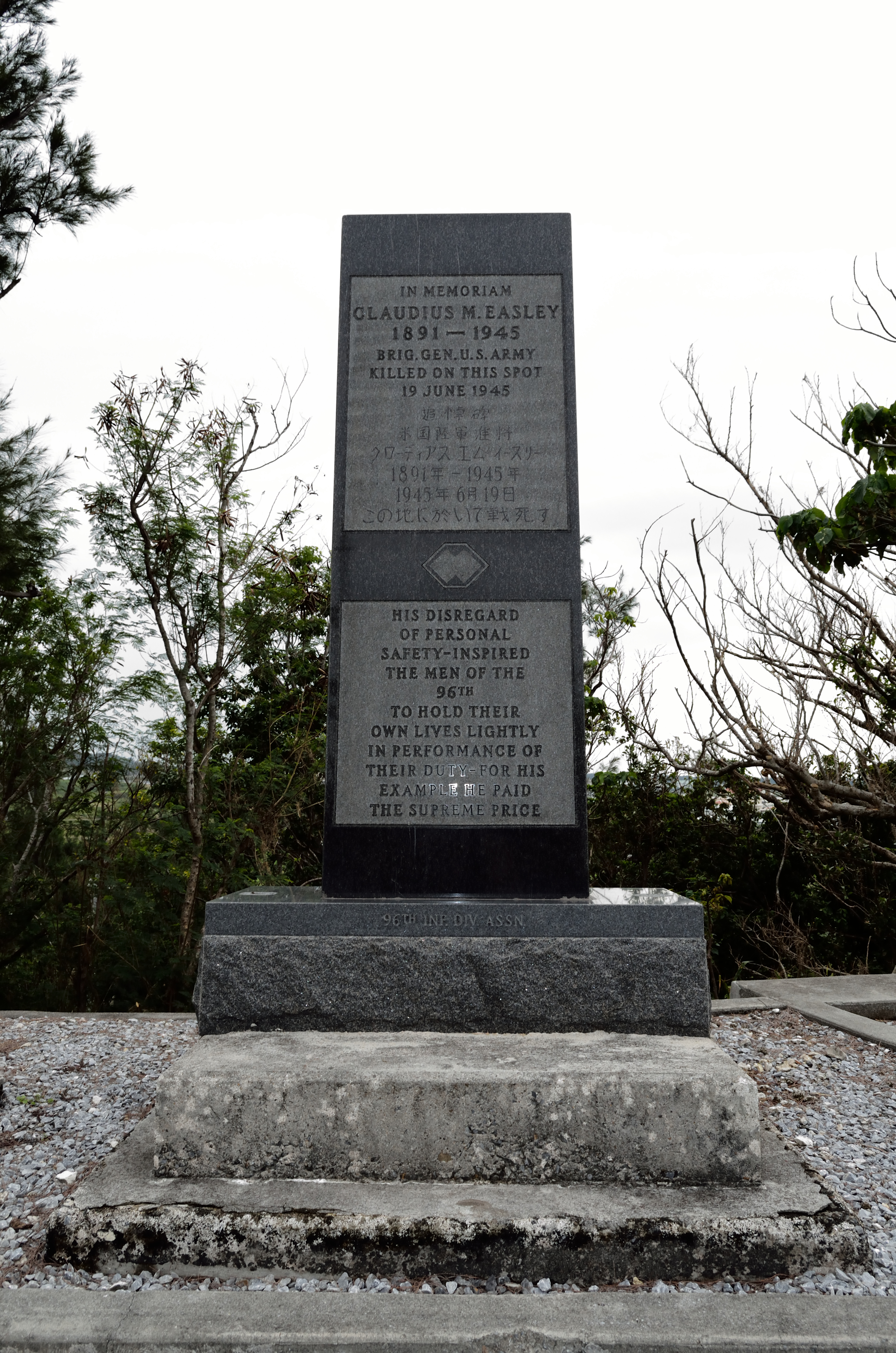
Brigadier General Easley's memorial monument in Okinawa, Japan. 26°6′52.62″N 127°40′49.51″E

Easley remained in command and later participated in the Battle of Okinawa, where he was decorated with the Silver Star for gallantry in action. On June 19, 1945, during the final phase of the battle, Easley went to the front to check the progress of his troops as they cleared the last Japanese positions. After a Japanese machine gun opened fire and wounded one of his aides, Easley crawled to the top of a knoll to try to locate its position. As he peered over the edge of the knoll, the machine gun fired a burst in his direction, and two rounds hit him in the forehead, killing him instantly. He was the second general officer killed in action during one week on Okinawa just a day after US Army Lt. Gen. Simon Bolivar Buckner Jr. was killed by Japanese artillery fire. He was initially buried in Okinawa, but was later reburied in the United States at Arlington National Cemetery in Virginia.

His son Claudius Miller Easley, Jr., served as a lieutenant colonel with the Sixth Army. On April 21, 1946, Easley was posthumously awarded a Doctorate of Laws by AMC.

== Decorations ==
Brigadier General Claudius M. Easley´s ribbon bar:

1st Row	Silver Star		Legion of Merit	Bronze Star Medal
2nd Row	Purple Heart with Oak Leaf Cluster	Mexican Border Service Medal	World War I Victory Medal	American Defense Service Medal
3rd Row	American Campaign Medal	Asiatic–Pacific Campaign Medal with three service stars	World War II Victory Medal	Philippine Liberation Medal with two stars
Presidential Unit Citation
