= 192nd Infantry Brigade (United States) =

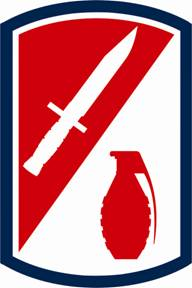
- Shoulder sleeve insignia
- Active: 1942–1946; 2007–16 June 2013
- Country: United States
- Branch: United States Army
- Type: Infantry
- Role: Training
- Size: Brigade
- Part of: First Army
- Engagements: World War II

Insignia
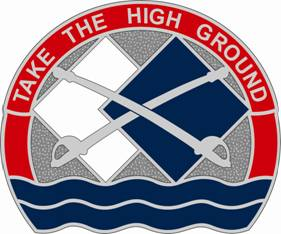
- 192nd Infantry Brigade DUI

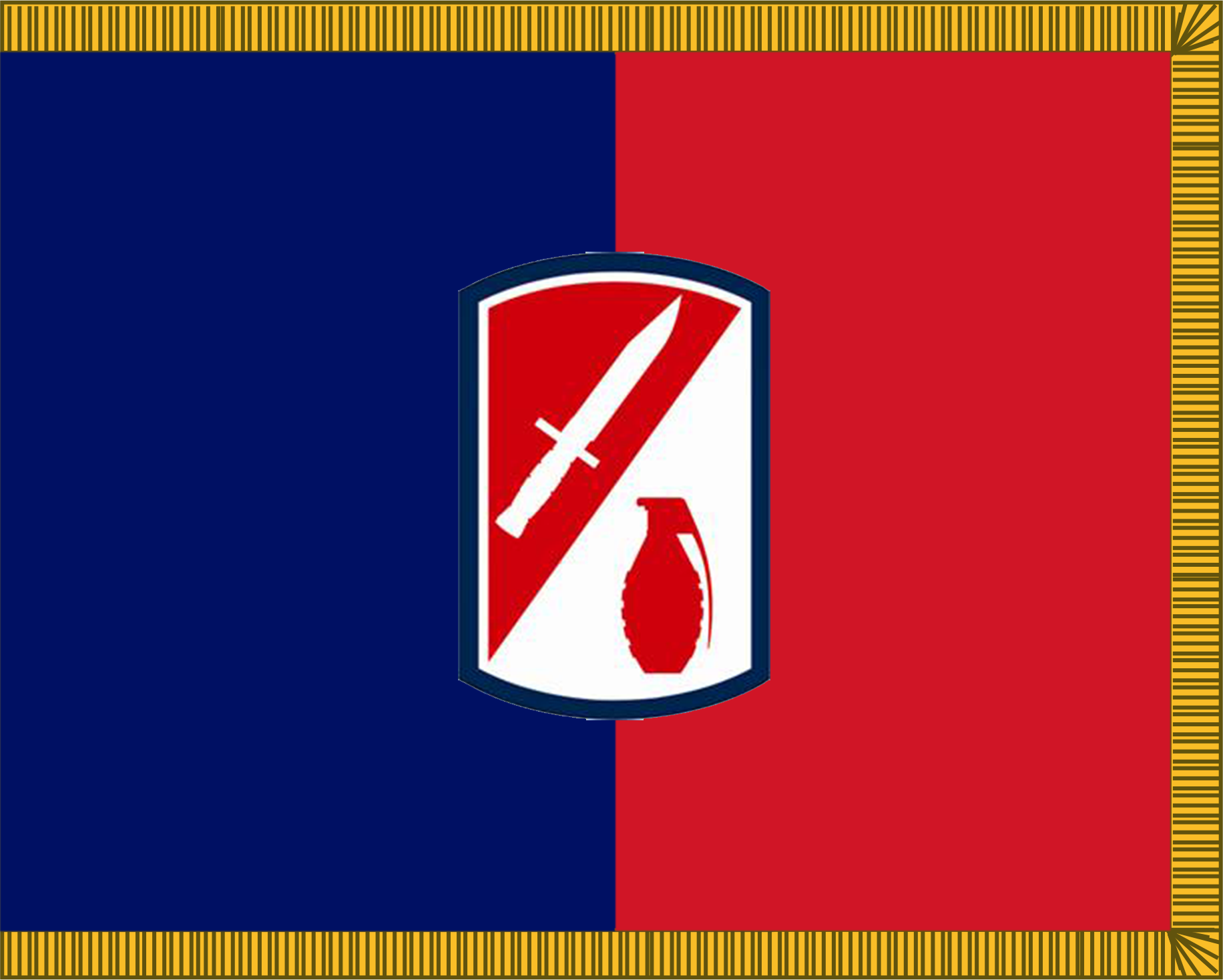
- 192nd Infantry Brigade Flag

The 192nd Infantry Brigade is an inactive infantry brigade of the United States Army. It was first formed as part of the United States Army Reserve's 96th Division. As part of the triangularization of the US Army before World War II, the Brigade was inactivated and the assets & personnel formed the 96th Reconnaissance Troop.

== World War II ==
The unit served as the 96th Recon Troop. It served as the "eyes & ears" of the 96th Infantry Division in the Pacific Theater during World War II.

- Activated: 15 August 1942.
- Overseas: 23 July 1944.
- Campaigns: Ryukyus, Southern Philippines.
- Returned to U. S.: 2 February 1946.
- Inactivated: 3 February 1946.

== 2007–2013 ==
The 192d Infantry Brigade was reactivated at Fort Benning, Georgia to serve as the Basic Combat Training Brigade from 2007 until 16 June 2013. The units of the 192d Infantry Brigade were moved to the 194th Armored Brigade when the brigade inactivated.

The brigade included the following units:

- Headquarters & Headquarters Company
- 2d Battalion, 54th Infantry
- 1st Battalion, 46th Infantry
- 2d Battalion, 47th Infantry
- 3d Battalion, 47th Infantry (Inactivation ceremony held on 8 April 2013)
- 30th Adjutant General Battalion
