= 191st Infantry Brigade (United States) =

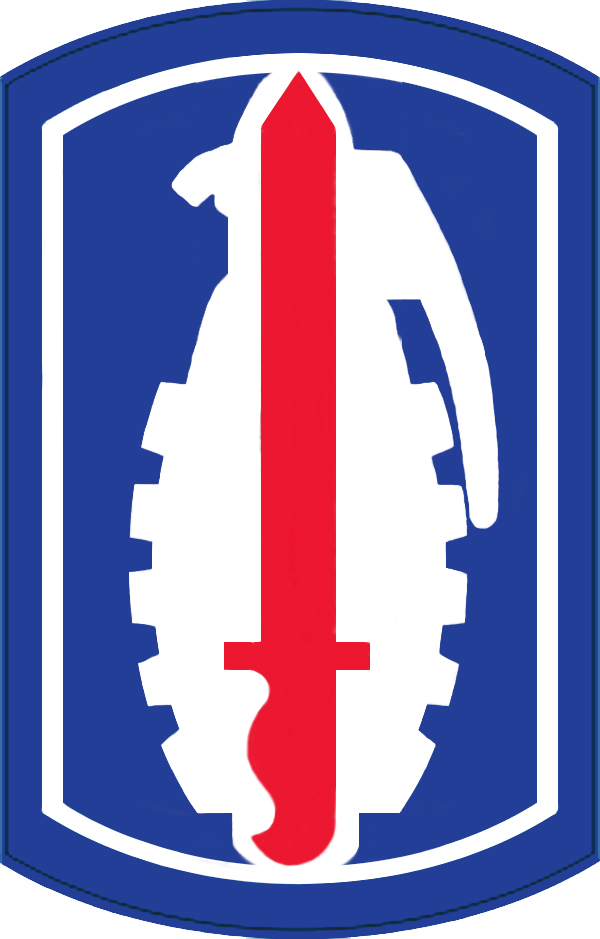
- Shoulder sleeve insignia
- Active: 24 June 1921–3 February 1946 (various designations); 20 January 1947–5 November 1962 (various designations); 5 November 1962–29 February 1968 (191st Infantry Brigade); 24 October 1997–16 October 1999; 1 December 2006–12 January 2014
- Country: United States
- Branch: United States Army
- Role: Training
- Size: Brigade
- Part of: United States Army Training and Doctrine Command
- Garrison/HQ: Joint Base Lewis-McChord, Washington
- Engagements: World War II; Leyte; Ryukyus
- Decorations: Philippine Presidential Unit Citation; Army Superior Unit Award

Insignia
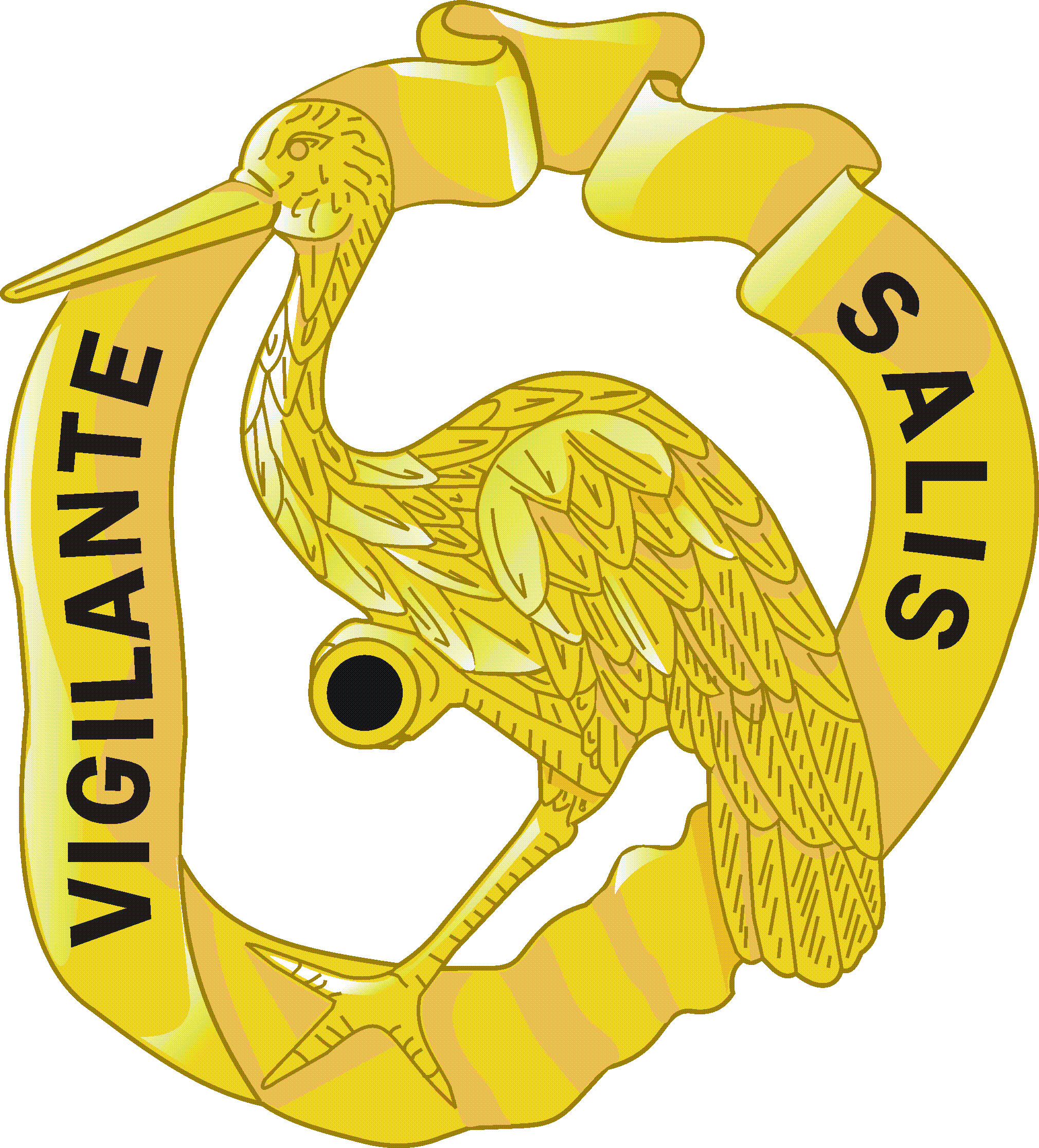
- Distinctive unit insignia

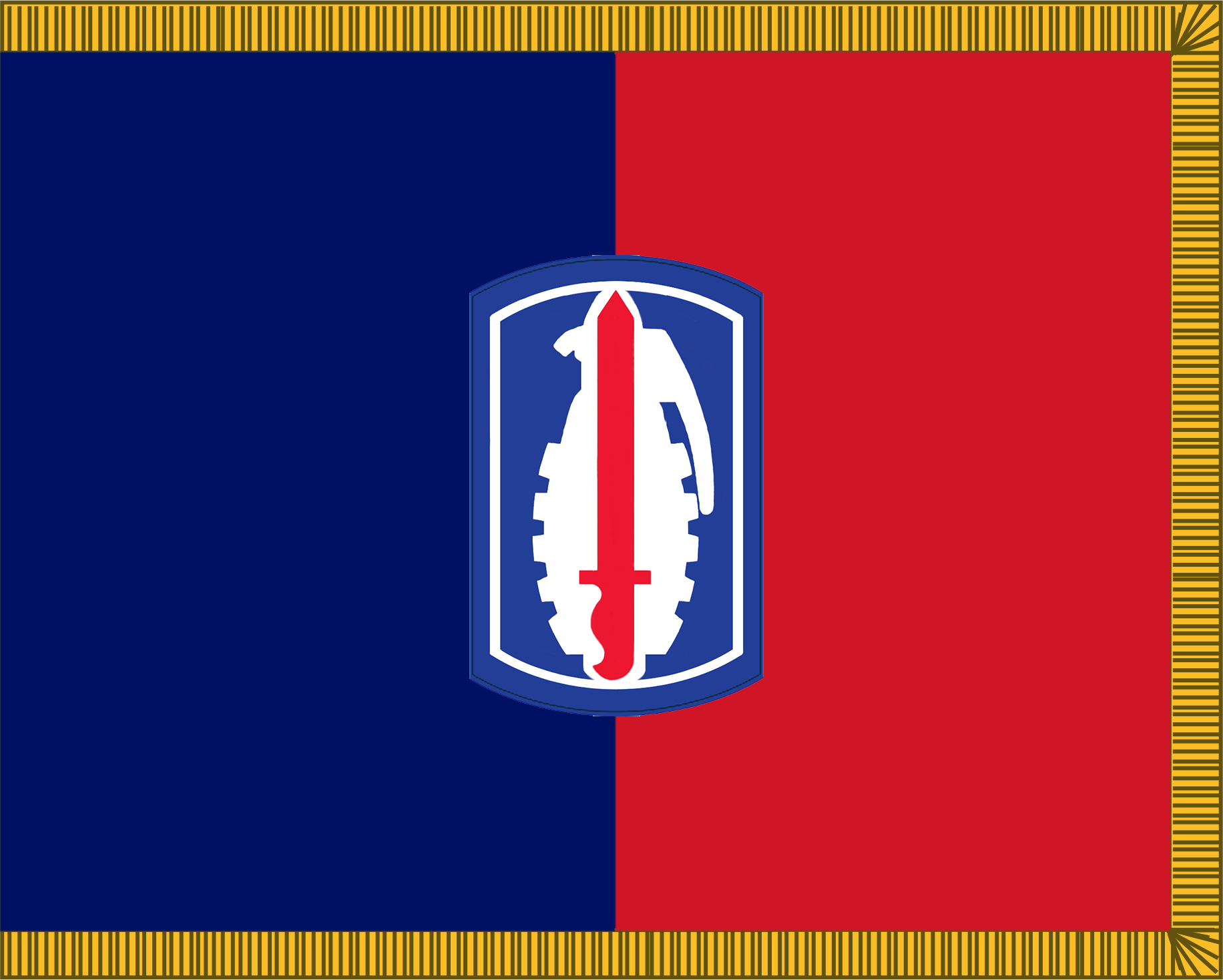
- 191st Infantry Brigade Flag

The 191st Infantry Brigade was constituted on 24 June 1921 in the Organized Reserves as Headquarters and Headquarters Company, 191st Infantry Brigade, and assigned to the 96th Division. It was organized in December 1921 at Portland, Oregon, and redesignated on 23 March 1925 as Headquarters and Headquarters Company, 191st Brigade, then redesignated on 24 August 1936 as Headquarters and Headquarters Company, 191st Infantry Brigade. It was converted and redesignated on 6 April 1942 as the 96th Reconnaissance Troop (less 3rd Platoon), 96th Division (Headquarters and Headquarters Company, 192d Infantry Brigade, concurrently converted and redesignated as the 3rd Platoon, 96th Reconnaissance Troop, 96th Division). The Troop was ordered into active military service on 15 August 1942 and reorganized at Camp Adair, Oregon, as the 96th Cavalry Reconnaissance Troop, an element of the 96th Infantry Division. It was reorganized and redesignated on 16 August 1943 as the 96th Reconnaissance Troop, Mechanized, and then again reorganized and redesignated on 20 November 1945 as the 96th Mechanized Cavalry Reconnaissance Troop. Following World War II service with the 96th Infantry Division in the Pacific, it was inactivated on 3 February 1946 at Camp Anza, California.

The unit was again activated on 20 January 1947 at Spokane, Washington. (The Organized Reserves was redesignated 25 March 1948 as the Organized Reserve Corps; redesignated 9 July 1952 as the Army Reserve.) It was reorganized and redesignated on 12 April 1949 as the 96th Reconnaissance Company and its location changed on 15 October 1951 to Salt Lake City, Utah. As part of an overall force reduction in the Reserve, the unit was inactivated 1 June 1959 at Salt Lake City, Utah. It was converted and redesignated (less 3rd Platoon) on 5 November 1962 as Headquarters and Headquarters Company, 191st Infantry Brigade, and relieved from assignment to the 96th Infantry Division (3rd Platoon, 96th Reconnaissance Company, concurrently redesignated as Headquarters and Headquarters Company, 192nd Infantry Brigade – hereafter separate lineage) and activated on 1 February 1963 at Helena, Montana, as the Army Reserve's only mechanized infantry brigade, with elements in four states. The brigade consisted of these units:

- Headquarters & Headquarters Company, 191st Infantry Brigade, Helena, MT
- 3rd Battalion, 38th Infantry, Provo, UT
- 1st Battalion, 59th Infantry, Phoenix, AZ
- 4th Battalion, 81st Armor, Salt Lake City, UT (attached for training)
- 8th Battalion, 40th Armor, Tucson, AZ
- 4th Battalion, 35th Artillery, Billings, MT
- 4th Battalion, 11th Artillery, Salt Lake City, UT (attached for training)
- Troop D, 8th Cavalry, Ogden, UT
- 191st Support Battalion, Great Falls, MT
  - Co B (Medical), Pocatello, ID
- 391st Engineer Company, Missoula, MT

The 191st held its first active duty training as a brigade at Fort Lewis, WA, in June 1963 and in May 1964 took part in Exercise DESERT STRIKE in the Mojave Desert. Half of the brigade took part in the exercise while the other half participated in active duty training at Fort Irwin, CA. According to an article in the March 1967 issue of The Army Reserve Magazine, "The 191st was to be the largest Army Reserve element in a combined operation that brought Active Army and Reserve Component troops together in the largest peacetime maneuver ever held in the United States. Under the guidance of [Brigadier] General [John P.] Connor, the brigade worked around the clock to bring troops and equipment to the required state of readiness to make a good showing for the Army Reserve during the exercise".

The brigade returned to Fort Irwin for its 1965 active duty training, the first time all elements of the entire brigade attended training at the same location at the same time. This was followed by extensive home station training in preparation for active duty training in 1966. Such training continued into the following year as the brigade prepared for a field training exercise at Fort Irwin in June 1967.

The 191st Infantry Brigade was inactivated on 29 February 1968 at Helena, Montana, after only five years of existence, although some of its subordinate elements remained active as separate units. This included the 8th Battalion, 40th Armor, which was reassigned to the 63d ARCOM.

In late July 1990, soldiers of 8th, 40th Armor were sent to Fort Hunter Ligget, California for Annual Training. After their arrival, they were notified they were to be mobilized in preparation for Operation Desert Shield (Due to Iraq invading Kuwait, 2 Aug. 1990)

On 24 October 1997 the brigade was withdrawn from the Army Reserve and allotted to the Regular Army; Headquarters concurrently activated at Fort Lewis, Washington. It was inactivated there on 16 October 1999, then reactivated at Fort Lewis on 1 December 2006. This was accomplished by reorganizing and reflagging the existing 4th Brigade, 91st Division (Training Support) and assuming the mission to train Army Reserve and National Guard units.

In September 2012 elements of HQ 191st Infantry Brigade deployed as an SFAT (Strategic Forces Advisory Team) to eastern Afghanistan in support of Operation ENDURING FREEDOM. The brigade was inactivated at Fort Lewis, Washington, during a ceremony held on 8 January 2014 and elements of the unit were integrated with the 189th Infantry Brigade (Training Support).

== Organization ==
During its most recent service the brigade was composed of:

- Headquarters & Headquarters Company, 191st Infantry Brigade
- 1st Battalion, 356th Regiment (Logistics Support Battalion)
- 1st Battalion, 357th Regiment (Infantry)
- 2nd Battalion, 357th Regiment (Infantry)
- 2nd Battalion, 358th Regiment (Armor)
- 3rd Battalion, 358th Regiment (Field Artillery)
- 1st Battalion, 364th Regiment (Training Support Battalion)
- 2nd Battalion, 364th Regiment (Training Support Battalion)
- 3rd Battalion, 364th Regiment (Engineer)

== Unit decorations ==
Streamer	Award	Year	Orders
	Philippine Republic Presidential Unit Citation	17 OCTOBER 1944 TO 4 JULY 1945	
	Army Superior Unit Award	2008-2011	Permanent Orders 332-07 announcing award of the Army Superior Unit award

== Campaign streamers ==
Conflict	Streamer	Year(s)
World War II	Leyte (with Arrowhead)	1944
World War II	Ryukyus	1945
