= 96th Infantry Division (United States) =

96th Infantry Division 96th Sustainment Brigade
- Shoulder sleeve insignia
- Active: 5 September 1918–7 January 1919 (National Army); 24 June 1921–3 February 1946 (Organized Reserves); 31 December 1946–31 December 1966 (Army Reserve); 22 April 1968–16 April 1996 (96th ARCOM); 16 April 1996–16 July 2003 (96th RSC); 16 July 2003–17 September 2008 (96th RRC); 17 September 2008–present (96th Sust. Bge.)
- Country: United States
- Branch: United States Army Reserve
- Role: Sustainment
- Size: Brigade
- Part of: 364th Expeditionary Sustainment Command
- Garrison/HQ: Fort Douglas, Utah
- Nicknames: "Columbia Division" "Deadeye Division"
- Motto: To Serve And Excel
- Engagements: World War II; Leyte with arrowhead; Ryukyus; Operation Iraqi Freedom; Iraqi Governance; National Resolution; Operation Inherent Resolve
- Decorations: Presidential Unit Citation; Philippine Republic Presidential Unit Citation

Commanders
- Commander: COL Charles E. Fairbanks
- Notable commanders: MGen James L. Bradley (WWII); BGen Claudius M. Easley (WWII Asst CGO); BGen Ray D. Free (USAR)

Insignia
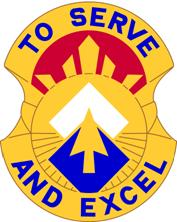
- 96TH SUSTAINMENT BRIGADE DUI

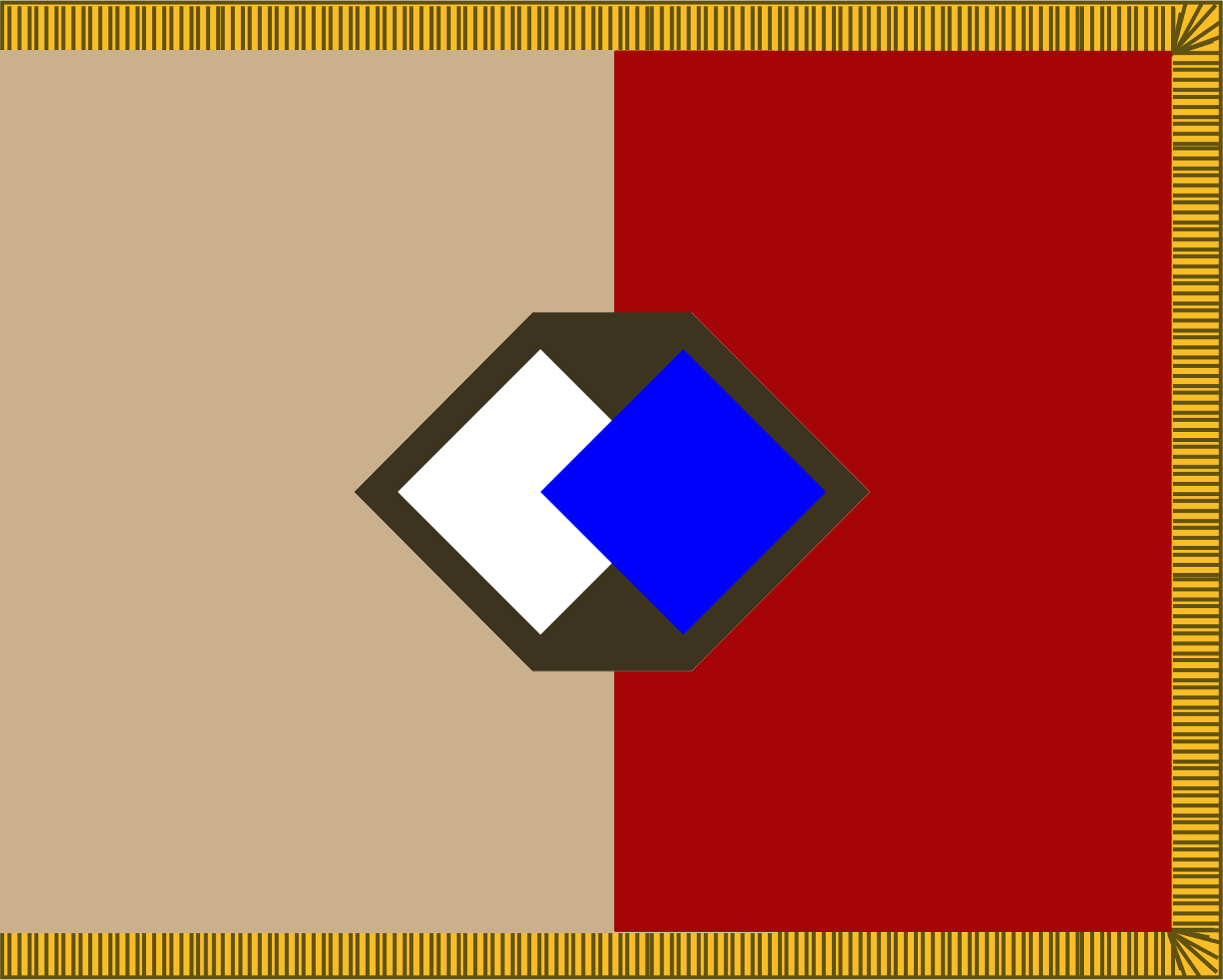
- 96th Sustainment Brigade Flag

The 96th Infantry Division was an infantry division of the United States Army. It was formed in 1918 and served in World War I and in the Pacific War during World War II. It was reformed after the war and was part of the United States Army Reserve until 1965.

In 1967 the number "96" was resurrected for a U.S. Army Reserve area administrative headquarters, the 96th Army Reserve Command. Technically it had no lineage connection to the 96th Infantry Division. With a number of redesignations, it continues in service in the 21st Century. Effective 17 September 2008, it became the 96th Sustainment Brigade, with its headquarters located at Fort Douglas, Salt Lake City, Utah.

== History ==
=== World War I ===
On 5 September 1918, the War Department directed the organization of the 96th Division at Camp Wadsworth, South Carolina. Plans called for the division to include a headquarters, headquarters troop, the 191st Infantry Brigade (381st and 382nd Infantry Regiments and 362nd Machine Gun Battalion), 192nd Infantry Brigade (383rd and 384th Infantry Regiments and 363rd Machine Gun Battalion), 361st Machine Gun Battalion, 171st Field Artillery Brigade (64th-66th Field Artillery Regiments and 22nd Trench Mortar Battery), 321st Engineers, 621st Field Signal Battalion, and 321st Train Headquarters and Military Police (Ammunition, Engineer, Sanitary, and Supply Trains).

The 171st Field Artillery Brigade (including the 321st Ammunition Train) was to be organized at Camp Kearny, California, while it was intended that the 191st Infantry Brigade would be organized in France from the 3rd and 4th Pioneer Infantry Regiments. Formation of the division began in October with the appointment of Major General Guy Carleton to command. By the end of October and the Armistice of 11 November 1918, the strength of the division was only around 3,100 officers and men and training had not progressed beyond the elementary phases, and it was ordered demobilized on 30 November 1918. The division was demobilized on 7 January 1919 at Camp Wadsworth.

=== Interwar period ===
The 96th Division was reconstituted in the Organized Reserve on 24 June 1921, allotted to the Ninth Corps Area, and assigned to the XIX Corps. The division was further allotted to the states of Oregon and Washington as its home area. The division headquarters was organized on 7 October 1921 at the New Post Office Building in Portland, Oregon, and remained there until activated for World War II. To encourage esprit de corps, in September 1922 the division’s officers adopted the nickname “Columbia Division” after the Columbia River, which ran through the middle of the division’s home area. To maintain communications with the officers of the division, the division staff published a newsletter nicknamed "The Columbian." The newsletter informed the division’s members of such things as when and where the inactive training sessions were to be held, what the division’s summer training quotas were, where the camps were to be held, and which units would be assigned to conduct the Citizens Military Training Camps.

The designated mobilization and training station for the division was Camp Lewis (later redesignated Fort Lewis in 1931), Washington, the location where much of the 96th’s training activities occurred over the next 20 years. For the few summers when the division headquarters was called to duty for training as a unit, it usually trained with the staff of the 3rd Division at Camp Lewis. The subordinate infantry regiments of the division held their summer training primarily with the units of the 3rd Division's 5th Infantry Brigade at Fort Lewis or Vancouver Barracks, Washington. Other units, such as the special troops, artillery, engineers, aviation, medical, and quartermaster, trained at various posts in the Ninth Corps Area with Regular Army units of the same branch. For example, the 321st Engineer Regiment usually trained with elements of the 6th Engineer Regiment at Fort Lewis or Fort Lawton, Washington; the 321st Medical Regiment trained with the 3rd Medical Regiment at Camp Lewis; and the 321st Observation Squadron trained with the 91st Observation Squadron at Crissy Field, California. In addition to the unit training camps, the infantry regiments of the division rotated responsibility to conduct the Citizens Military Training Camps training held at Camp Lewis each year.

On a number of occasions, the division participated in Ninth Corps Area and Fourth Army command post exercises (CPXs) in conjunction with other Regular Army, National Guard, and Organized Reserve units. These training events gave division staff officers’ opportunities to practice the roles they would be expected to perform in the event the division was mobilized. Unlike the Regular and Guard units in the Ninth Corps Area, the 96th Division did not participate in the various Ninth Corps Area maneuvers and the Fourth Army maneuvers of 1937, 1940, and 1941 as an organized unit due to lack of enlisted personnel and equipment. Instead, the officers and a few enlisted reservists were assigned to Regular and Guard units to fill vacant slots and bring the units up to full peace strength for the exercises. For the 1937 maneuver, for example, about 200 of the division’s officers were attached to the National Guard's 41st Division (Idaho, Montana, Oregon, Washington, and Wyoming) to allow that unit to function as an almost full-strength division. Additionally, some officers were assigned duties as umpires or as support personnel.

The 321st Squadron was redesignated as the 321st Observation Squadron on 25 January 1923. Relieved on 21 February 1929 from assignment to the 96th Division.

=== World War II ===
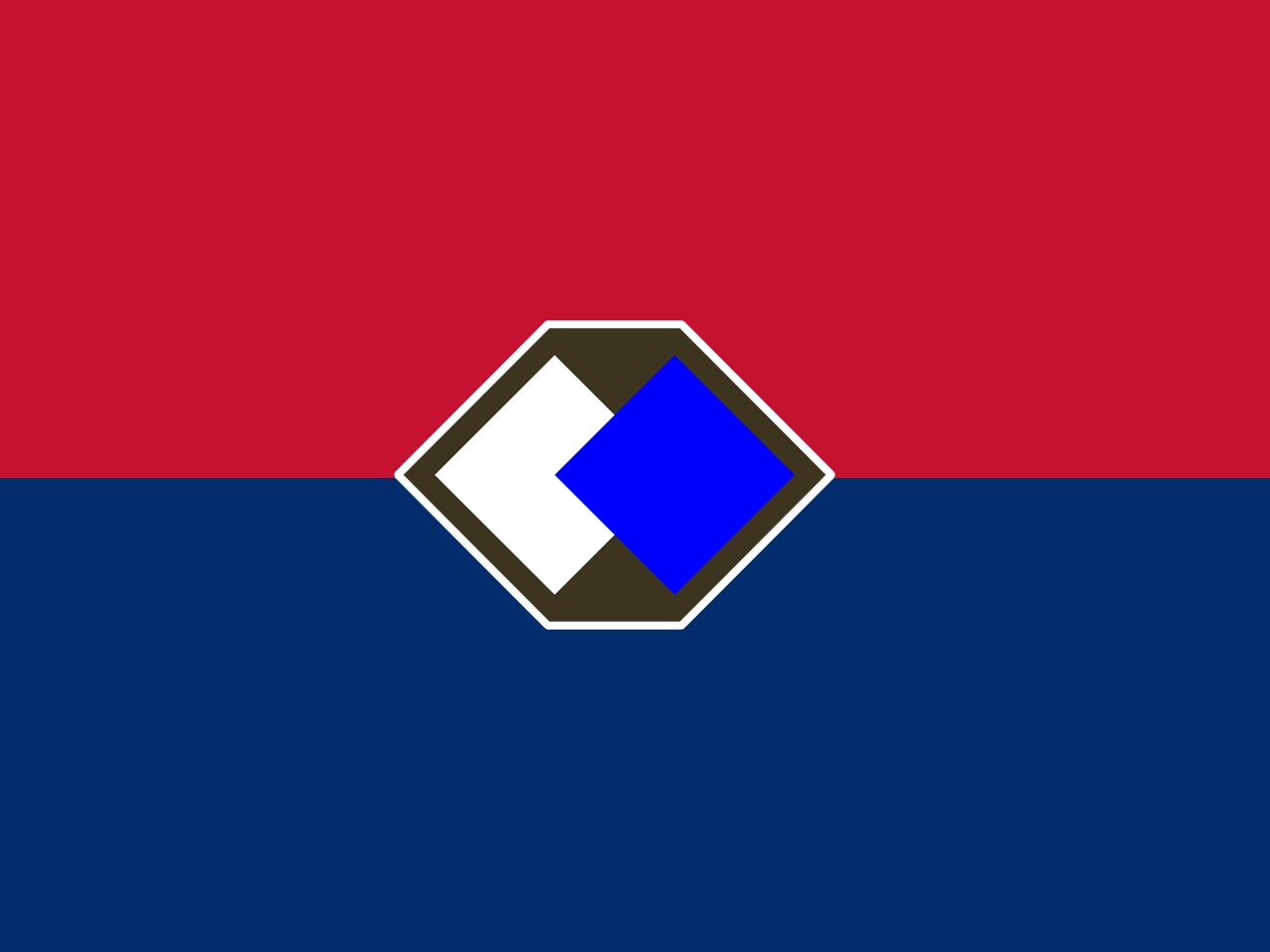
Flag of the United States Army 96th Infantry Division

- Ordered into active service: 15 August 1942, Camp Adair, Oregon.
- Overseas: 23 July 1944.
- Campaigns: Leyte, Ryukyus
- Days of Combat: 200
- Entered Combat: 20 October 1944 (Leyte)
- Killed In Action: 1,563
- Total Casualties: 8,812
- Presidential Unit Citation: 1.
- Awards: MH-5; DSC-12; DSM-1; SS-232; LM-4; SM-73; BSM-4,588; AM-84.
- Commanders: Maj. Gen. James L. Bradley commanded the division throughout the entirety of World War II.
- Assistant Division Commanders: Brig. Gen. Claudius M. Easley (August 1942 – June 1945, KIA); Brig. Gen. Dennis E. McCunniff (December 1945 – February 1946)
- Division Artillery Commander: Brig Gen. Paul V. Kane (July 1942 – April 1944); Brig Gen. Robert G. Gard (May 1944 – December 1945)
- Chief of Staff: Colonel Hammond M. Monroe (May 1942 – May 1944)
- Returned to U.S.: 2 February 1946.

==== Mobilization ====
The 96th Division was ordered into active service on 15 August 1942, eight months after the Attack on Pearl Harbor brought the United States into World War II. Before Organized Reserve infantry divisions were ordered into active military service, they were reorganized on paper as "triangular" divisions under the 1940 tables of organization. The headquarters companies of the two infantry brigades were consolidated into the division's cavalry reconnaissance troop, and one infantry regiment was removed by inactivation. The 384th Infantry Regiment was relieved from the division and the field artillery regiments were reorganized into four field artillery battalions—the 361st, 362rd, and 921st (105mm howitzers), and 363rd (155mm howitzers). The field artillery brigade headquarters and headquarters battery became the headquarters and headquarters battery of the division artillery, and its three field artillery regiments were reorganized into four battalions. The engineer, medical, and quartermaster regiments were reorganized into battalions. In 1942, divisional quartermaster battalions were split into ordnance light maintenance companies and quartermaster companies, and the division's headquarters and military police company, which had previously been a combined unit, was split.

==== Division organization ====
The division consisted of the following units:

96th Infantry Division organization (click to enlarge)

- 96th Infantry Division
  - 96th Infantry Division Headquarters
  - 96th Cavalry Reconnaissance Troop (Mechanized) (M3 scout cars and then M8 Greyhound armored cars)
  - 381st Infantry Regiment
    - Headquarters and Headquarters Company
    - 3× Infantry battalions
      - each battalion consists of: 1× Headquarters and Headquarters Company, 3× Rifle companies, 1× Heavy Weapons Company
    - Cannon Company (T12 Gun Motor Carriages and T19 Howitzer Motor Carriages, later replaced by either M3 105mm towed howitzers or M7 Priest self propelled howitzers)
    - Anti-Tank Company (M3 37mm anti-tank guns, which were replaced by 1944 with M1 57mm anti-tank guns)
    - Service Company
  - 382nd Infantry Regiment
    - same organization as 381st Infantry Regiment
  - 383rd Infantry Regiment
    - same organization as 381st Infantry Regiment
  - 96th Infantry Division Artillery
    - Headquarters and Headquarters Battery
    - 361st Field Artillery Battalion
      - Headquarters and Headquarters Battery
      - 3× Batteries (M2 105mm towed howitzers)
      - Service Battery
    - 362nd Field Artillery Battalion
      - same organization as 361st Field Artillery Battalion
    - 363rd Field Artillery Battalion
      - Headquarters and Headquarters Battery
      - 3× Batteries (M1 155mm towed howitzers)
      - Service Battery
    - 921st Field Artillery Battalion
      - same organization as 361st Field Artillery Battalion
  - Headquarters Special Troops
    - Headquarters Company, 96th Infantry Division
    - 96th Signal Company
    - 96th Quartermaster Company
    - 796th Ordnance Light Maintenance Company
    - Military Police Platoon
    - 96th Infantry Division Band (attached)
  - 321st Engineer Combat Battalion
    - Headquarters and Headquarters and Service Company
    - 3× Engineer combat companies
  - 321st Medical Battalion
    - Headquarters and Headquarters Detachment
    - 3× Collecting companies
    - Clearing Company

==== Combat chronicle ====
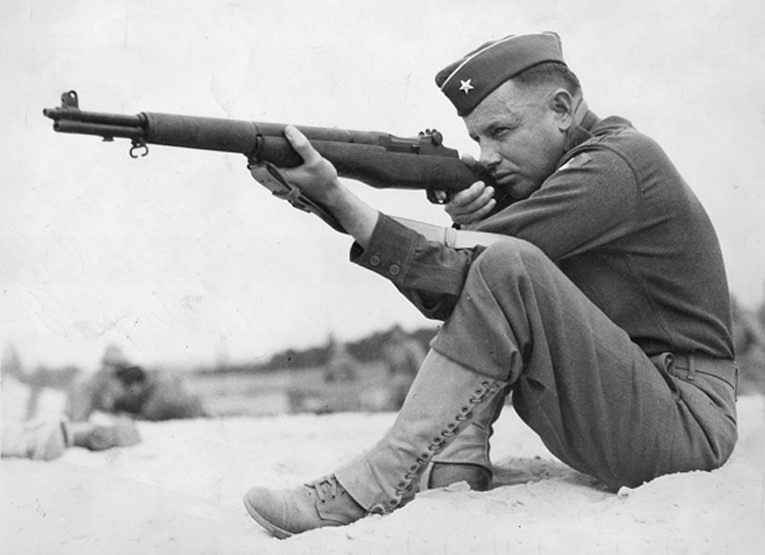
Brig. Gen. Claudius Miller Easley personally supervised the 96th's marksmanship training, earning it the nickname "Deadeyes". He was later killed on Okinawa.

Machine gun crew of the 1st Bn., 381st Infantry, keep on the alert for enemy movement on Okinawa. 19 April 1945

Before Organized Reserve infantry divisions were ordered into active military service, they were reorganized on paper as "triangular" divisions under the 1940 tables of organization. The two infantry brigade headquarters were converted to provide personnel for other units, and the 380th Infantry Regiment was disbanded. The 192nd Infantry Brigade headquarters company was converted into the division's 96th Reconnaissance Troop, while the 191st Infantry Brigade headquarters formed the core of the division's headquarters company. The field artillery brigade headquarters and headquarters battery became the headquarters and headquarters battery of the division artillery. Its three field artillery regiments were reorganized into four battalions; one battalion was taken from each of the two 75 mm gun regiments to form two 105 mm howitzer battalions, the brigade's ammunition train was reorganized as the third 105 mm howitzer battalion, and the 155 mm howitzer battalion was formed from the 155 mm howitzer regiment. The engineer, medical, and quartermaster regiments were reorganized into battalions. In 1942, divisional quartermaster battalions were split into ordnance light maintenance companies and quartermaster companies, and the division's headquarters and military police company, which had previously been a combined unit, was split.

Initial training started at Camp Adair, Oregon in late 1942. Upon completion of basic training, the 96th Infantry Division went to Ft. Lewis, Washington, prior to their first combat training exercise in Central Oregon. After that first month in the central Oregon plateau, they settled in the winter of 1943 at Camp White in southern Oregon. The 96th Infantry Division then participated in a second Oregon Maneuver combat exercise in the fall of 1943. Major General James L. Bradley commanded the 96th Infantry Division throughout its entire life in World War II. His assistant division commander, Brigadier General (later Major General) Claudius M. Easley, who would later be killed in action on Okinawa on 19 June 1945, personally supervised and emphasized the 96th Division's marksmanship training, leading to the 96th's nickname of "Deadeye Division".

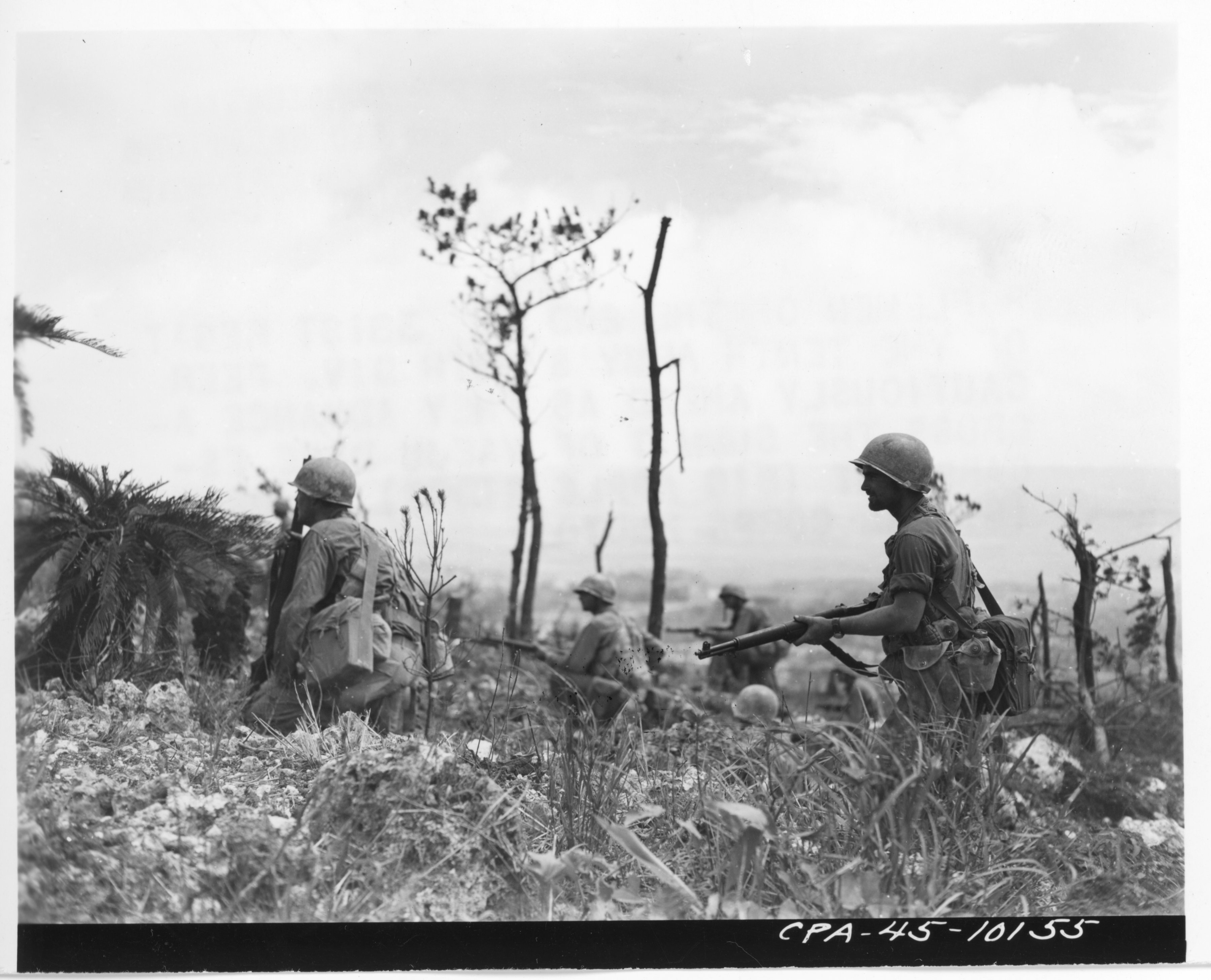
Riflemen of the 2nd Bn., 381st Regiment of the 96th Division peer cautiously ahead as they advance across the summit of Yaeju-Dake escarpment (Big Apple Ridge) on Okinawa. 14 June 1945.

By 18 July 1944, the entire Division began staging at Camp Stoneman for departure from the San Francisco Port of Embarkation. On 21 July, The Division began shipping out for Hawaii and jungle training on Oahu before its first combat operations against Japanese-held Yap in the western Pacific. The 96th Infantry Division trained in the Hawaiian Islands from July to September 1944, before entering combat in an assault landing in Leyte Gulf, Philippine Islands, between Tanauan and Dulag on 20 October 1944. Enemy resistance in the beachhead area was quickly broken and the Division had advanced to and secured the Tanauan-Dagami-Tabontabon sector by 9 November after heavy fighting. The Division continued to wipe out resistance on the island, engaging in small unit actions, patrolling, probing, and wiping out pockets of Japanese. Chalk Ridge was taken, 12 December 1944, and major organized resistance was at an end by Christmas Day. The next 3 months were spent in mopping up, security duty, training, and loading for the coming invasion of Okinawa.

The Division left the Philippines on 27 March 1945, for Okinawa, making an assault landing on the island, 1 April 1945. The landing was unopposed and a beachhead was established near Sunabe, 1–3 April. Resistance stiffened considerably as the Division advanced to Kakazu Ridge, where fighting was fierce, 7–16 April. The 96th assaulted and cracked the fanatically defended enemy defense line, Tanabaru-Nishibaru, 17–23 April, and after advancing slightly against extremely determined resistance, was relieved on 30 April by the 77th Infantry Division. The Division trained and rested, 1–9 May, while elements mopped up bypassed enemy pockets and then returned to the offensive, 10 May, attacking and capturing Conical-Sugar Hill Ridge on 21 May, thus breaking the right flank of the Shuri defenses. Heavy rains the following week slowed down the advance. The offensive was resumed, 30 May, against weakening enemy resistance; Japanese north of Yonabaru-Shuri-Naha Road area were cleared out. Resistance stiffened again, 3 June, and Laura Hill was taken, 14 June 1945, only after a bloody fight; the last important Japanese defense position, the Yuza-Dake, Yaeju-Dake Hill mass, was secured by 17 June, and on 22 June all resistance was declared at an end. The Division patrolled an area from Chan to Ogusuku until 30 June.

After resting in July, the Division left Okinawa for Mindoro, in the Philippines, and engaged in a training program. The Division left the Philippines, 17 January 1946, for the United States.

The division was inactivated on 3 February 1946, at Camp Anza, California.

=== Individual awards ===
- Beauford T. Anderson, Technical sergeant – 381st Infantry Regiment (Battle of Okinawa)
- Clarence B. Craft, Private first class – 382nd Infantry Regiment (Battle of Okinawa)
- Ova A. Kelley, Private – 382nd Infantry Regiment, KIA (Battle of Leyte)
- Louis Lusardi, Medic – (Battle of Okinawa)
- Edward J. Moskala, Private first class – 383rd Infantry Regiment, KIA (Battle of Okinawa)
- Seymour W. Terry, Captain – 382nd Infantry Regiment, KIA (Battle of Okinawa)

=== Cold War ===
The division was reactivated within the Army Reserve on 31 December 1946, commanded by Colonel Ross J. Wilson of Kalispell, Montana. The division headquarters was Fort Missoula, Montana. Major units were located at Great Falls, Montana, Phoenix, Arizona, and Salt Lake City. The division appears to have kept the 381st, 382nd, and 383rd Infantry Regiments. In August 1948, Colonel LeRoy H. Anderson of Conrad, Montana was appointed as the Commander. The headquarters moved to Helena, Montana, and then transferred to Fort Douglas, Utah in 1962. Major General Michael B. Kauffman was named commander, followed by Brigadier General Ray D. Free. Within four months in 1963 the division became first an operational headquarters, then a command headquarters. The 96th Command Headquarters was inactivated on 31 December 1965.

However some previous elements of the division remained active within the newly activated 191st Infantry Brigade.

On 22 December 1967, the Department of the Army announced that Salt Lake City, Utah had been chosen as the site for one of the eighteen new nationwide Army Reserve Command (ARCOM) headquarters. The ARCOM would command all Army Reserve units in Utah, Idaho and Montana. In March 1968, the number "96" was assigned to the command. The Department of the Army allowed ARCOMs to wear the shoulder sleeve insignia and numerical designation of previously active infantry divisions but did not convey upon ARCOMs the lineages of those divisions, as it is against Army policy for TDA units, such as ARCOMs, to perpetuate the lineages of TO&E units, such as divisions. Also in March the 259th Quartermaster Battalion, an ARCOM unit in Pleasant Grove, Utah was ordered to active duty. In September, the 259th transferred overseas for duty in Vietnam and served with distinction, being awarded the Meritorious Unit Commendation. It was released from active duty on 18 September 1969. Sterling R. Ryser succeeded Major General Free as ARCOM commander in early 1969. In 1971 with the merger of the Fourth and Fifth Army areas, the 96th ARCOM's span of command was increased to include North Dakota, South Dakota, Wyoming, and Colorado. In 1973 the command was again reorganized, gaining the state of New Mexico and losing North and South Dakota.

Since 1974, 96th ARCOM units have trained with their regular Army counterparts throughout the United States, Europe, and Asia. Franklin McKean was appointed Commanding General in 1975, followed by Larry Morris in 1979. In 1984, the ARCOM was again reorganized, losing New Mexico and regaining North and South Dakota. Richard O. Christiansen was appointed as Commanding General. In 1985, the 96th ARCOM was geographically the largest Army Reserve Command in the United States. The ARCOM consisted of 94 units and 9,320 reservists, augmented by 243 full-time soldiers and 288 civilian employees. On 9 April 1989 Donald M. Bagley was appointed Commanding General.

=== Recent history ===
In 1991, 3rd Battalion, 87th Infantry Regiment, located in Colorado, was mobilized for security duties in Germany during the Gulf War. In 1993 MG Richard F. Reeder assumed command of the 96th ARCOM. In 1996, as part of the US Army Reserve Command restructuring, the 96th ARCOM became the 96th Regional Support Command. After the end of the Cold War, the command was finally redesignated the 96th Regional Readiness Command. Subordinate units of the 96th RRC have been deployed to Iraq, Afghanistan, and Djibouti in support of the Global War on Terror from 2001. Units have also been deployed to Bosnia and Herzegovina and Kosovo as part of peacekeeping operations in the Balkans.

Effective 17 September 2008, the 96th Regional Readiness Command was reorganized and redesignated as the 96th Sustainment Brigade, with its headquarters located at Fort Douglas, Salt Lake City, Utah. The 96th Sustainment Brigade deployed for Operation Iraqi Freedom in 2009. The brigade returned to the United States in May 2010.

In 2015, members of the headquarters element mobilized in support of Operation Inherent Resolve fighting Daesh in Iraq and Syria, providing support to Special Operations Command Central, and returned to the U.S. in April 2016.

== Organization ==
The brigade is a subordinate unit of the 364th Expeditionary Sustainment Command. As of January 2026 the brigade consists of the following units:

- 96th Sustainment Brigade, at Fort Douglas (UT)
  - 96th Special Troops Battalion, at Fort Douglas (UT)
    - Headquarters and Headquarters Company, 96th Sustainment Brigade, at Fort Douglas (UT)
    - 850th Brigade Signal Company (MEB/CAB/SB), at Fort Douglas (UT)
    - 478th Human Resources Company, at Fort Douglas (UT)
    - 395th Financial Management Support Unit, at Fort Douglas (UT)
  - 191st Combat Sustainment Support Battalion, at Fort Douglas (UT)
    - Headquarters and Headquarters Company, 191st Combat Sustainment Support Battalion, at Fort Douglas (UT)
    - 146th Transportation Medium Truck Company (POL, 5K GAL) (EAB Linehaul), in Ogden (UT)
    - 419th Transportation Medium Truck Company (POL, 5K GAL) (EAB Linehaul), in Salt Lake City (UT)
    - 478th Human Resources Company, at Fort Douglas (UT)
    - 786th Quartermaster Company (Petroleum Support), in Provo (UT)
    - 872nd Ordnance Company (Support Maintenance), in Ogden (UT)
    - 889th Transportation Detachment (Movement Control Team), in Salt Lake City (UT)
    - 890th Transportation Company (Inland Cargo Transfer Company — ICTC), in Logan (UT)
  - 395th Financial Management Support Unit, at Fort Douglas (UT)

Abbreviations: POL — Petroleum Oil Lubricants; EAB — Echelon Above Brigade
