= Oregon Maneuver =

Large scale US military training exercise

- Part of World War II training
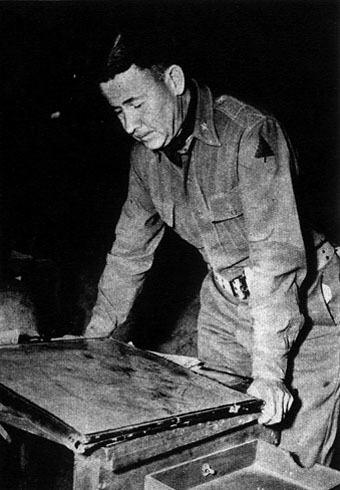
- Blue Force officer during Oregon Maneuver
Date	13 September-8 November 1943
Location	Central Oregon, United States

Belligerents
(United States) Red Force; 96th Infantry Division; IV Corps support	(United States) Blue Force; 91st Infantry Division; 104th Infantry Division; IV Corps support

Commanders and leaders
(United States) James L. Bradley	(United States) Gilbert R. Cook

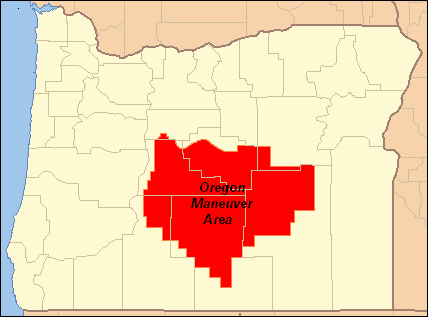

The Oregon Maneuver was a large scale military training exercise held in Central Oregon in September through November 1943. The exercise was designed to test United States Army units prior to deployment in support of Allied combat operations in World War II. The maneuver included approximately 100,000 men. The major units involved in the exercise were all part of the army's IV Corps, commanded by Major General Alexander Patch. The exercise headquarters was located at Camp Abbot, south of Bend, Oregon. The maneuver included five specific training problems that engaged troops from a defensive Red Force and an offensive Blue Force. Following the maneuver the three participating divisions, the 91st Infantry Division, the 96th Infantry Division, and the 104th Infantry Division were sent into combat in the European or the Pacific theaters.

== Background ==
The Oregon Maneuver was the largest military field exercise ever conducted in the Pacific Northwest. It involved over 100,000 army troops, many of them from Camp Adair, Camp White, and combat engineers training center at Camp Abbot. Camp Abbot was used as the exercise headquarters because of its military infrastructure and location near Bend in central Oregon.

The maneuver extended across parts of seven eastern Oregon counties, a total of over 10,000 square miles (26,000 km^{2}). Almost all of Deschutes County was included in the maneuver area along with large parts of Crook, Harney, Klamath, and Lake counties. Small portions of Jefferson and Grant counties were also included in the maneuver area. The area included parts of four national forests, the Deschutes National Forest in the west, the Fremont National Forest in the southwest, the Ochoco National Forest in the north and the Malheur National Forest in the northeast plus vast tracts of land administered by the Bureau of Land Management throughout the maneuver area. The maneuver area was an irregular triangle shape, with Sisters in the northwest corner, Burns in the northeast corner, and Valley Falls in the south.

The three divisions that made up the IV Corps were the 91st Infantry Division, the 96th Infantry Division, and the 104th Infantry Division. During the exercise the 96th Infantry Division became the core element of the Red Force. The Red Force was commanded by Major General James L. Bradley. The 91st Infantry Division and the 104th Infantry Division were combined to create the Blue Force. The Blue Force was commanded by Major General Gilbert R. Cook. The Red Force was given the defensive role in the exercise; while the much larger Blue Force conducted offensive operations.

The maneuver plan called for the integration of infantry, armor, artillery, air forces, engineers, and support units in five specific training problems conducted in nine phases. The specific combat problems included an attack on a consolidated position; an attack and defense of a river line; and an assault and occupation of defensive positions. Army combat aircraft were assigned to support the maneuvering ground forces from airfield near Redmond, Madras, and Burns. To help simulate the hardships of real combat, each exercise phase was scheduled to run continuously for two to three days.

== Training exercise ==
Planning for the exercise began in the spring of 1943. By July 1943, preparations for the maneuver were underway in central Oregon. Before training could begin, army engineers had to complete a number of infrastructure projects including the construction of several airfields. Supply depots were established at key locations and a Signal Corps battalion set up a communication network in the maneuver area.

On 27 July 1943, General Patch and his senior staff arrived at Camp Abbot. The main bodies of infantry arrived in the maneuver area in early August. Most of the infantry units were initially bivouacked along U.S. Route 20 between Sisters and Bend. As the divisions moved to the maneuver area from Camp White and Camp Adair, Oregon state officials warned civilians there would be heavy military traffic crossing the Cascade Mountains over the McKenzie and Santiam passes and on U.S. Route 97. The public was also reminded to obey directions from military police when traveling anywhere in the maneuver area.

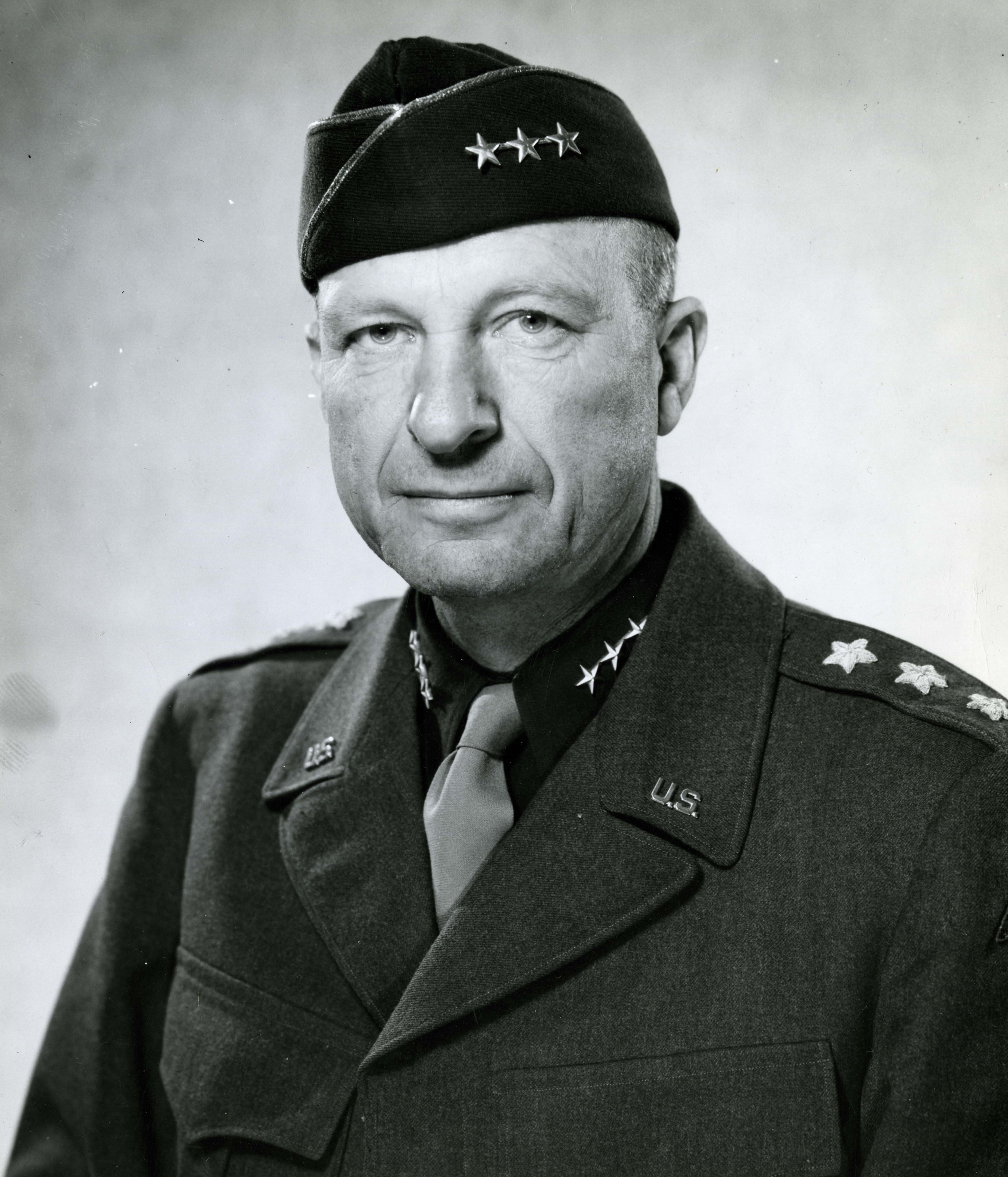
General Patch led the Oregon Maneuver

The initial phase of the maneuver was conducted in the triangle between Sisters, Bend, and Redmond. This phase lasted four weeks and focused on combat preparations including live-fire exercises. Combat engineers of the United States Army Corps of Engineers, many from the engineer training center at Camp Abbot, conducted bridging exercises along the Deschutes River. They also built roads and did other construction work throughout the maneuver area. Medical personnel participated in the maneuver as well, provided on-site medical care to injured and sick troops. As the maneuver got underway, Army logistics troops began working around the clock to move combat supplies, food, water, gasoline, and equipment from a special railhead near Bend to the front lines.

In mid-September, the Red Force deployed to positions 40 miles (64 km) east of Bend, establishing a north-south defensive line near Brothers, Oregon. The Blue Force attacked the line, forcing the Red division to withdraw further east. The Red Force's new defensive position was approximately 65 miles (105 km) east of Bend, near Hampton Mountain. Their defensive line stretched 20 miles (32 km) north to south. Again, Blue units attacked the Red line. After several days of stubborn resistance, the Red Force withdrew to the east toward Burns, fighting a delaying action as it pulled back. The Red Force abandoned the town of Burns, withdrawing to positions 30 miles (48 km) southwest of the city. The final battle of the Oregon Maneuver was conducted east of Wagontire, Oregon, near Silver Creek in Harney County, near where a real battle was fought during the Bannock War in 1878. The final battle lasted three days, with the Red Force occupying strong positions on high ground blocking U.S. Route 395. The larger Blue Force used tanks to spearhead their final assault, knocking out one Red outpost after another until the defenders could no longer maintain their line.

The final phase of the maneuver was observed by Lieutenant General Lesley McNair, chief of United States Army Ground Forces. During an interview at a dirt airfield near Alkali Lake, south of the Wagontire battle area, General McNair pronounced the maneuver a success. He also noted that the rugged High Desert terrain was an exceptionally good training environment for the troops participating in the maneuver. On 13 October 1943, General Patch officially ended the maneuver, declaring that the Red and Blue forces had both accomplished their training missions. The participating units began departing the maneuver area for their home stations in early November 1943. On 9 November 1943, Army officials announced they would repair roads damaged by tanks and other heavy vehicles during the maneuver.

The United States War Department report on the Oregon Maneuver said the high desert environment proved to be ideal for the prescribed training. It noted that "the generally clear, cold weather facilitated long foot marches and permitted almost continuous operations of aircraft." Commanders also found that temperatures could vary by as much as 50 °F (28 °C) in a twenty-four-hour period. This tested the troops in a wide variety of conditions. The report stated that the last two exercise problems were conducted when the temperatures were well below freezing, dropping to 6 °F (−14 °C) on some occasions. This was particularly challenging during a river-crossing operation that left participating personnel thoroughly wet; nevertheless, at the end of the maneuver the health of the entire command was found to be excellent.

== Post-exercise ==
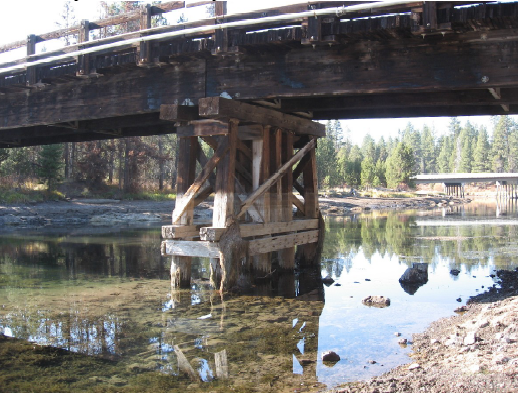
General Patch Bridge built during the maneuver

After completing the Oregon training maneuver, the three participating divisions were sent into combat. The 91st Infantry Division was sent to North Africa for staging before participating in combat operations in Italy. The 96th Infantry Division went to Hawaii to prepare for the invasion of the Philippines. The division participated in the Leyte landing followed by other combat operations in the Philippines. The division also fought at Okinawa. The 104th Infantry Division landed in France on 7 September 1944 and participated in combat operations in northern France, the Rhineland, and central Germany.

The only structure built during the Oregon Maneuver to survive for an extended period of time was the General Patch Bridge. The bridge was located on Deschutes National Forest land within the boundaries of Camp Abbot. The Forest Service demolished the bridge in 2008 because the wooden structure had become unsafe.

In 2009, the Oregon Legislature passed a bill designating the Oregon portion of U.S. Route 97 and parts of Oregon Route 126 as World War II Veterans Historic Highway in recognition of the Oregon Maneuver. The bill notes that the Oregon Maneuver was the largest military training exercise ever held in the Pacific Northwest, involving over 100,000 American soldiers and airmen.
