= Camp White =

Former military installation in Oregon, United States

Coordinates: 42.4375°N 122.85833°W

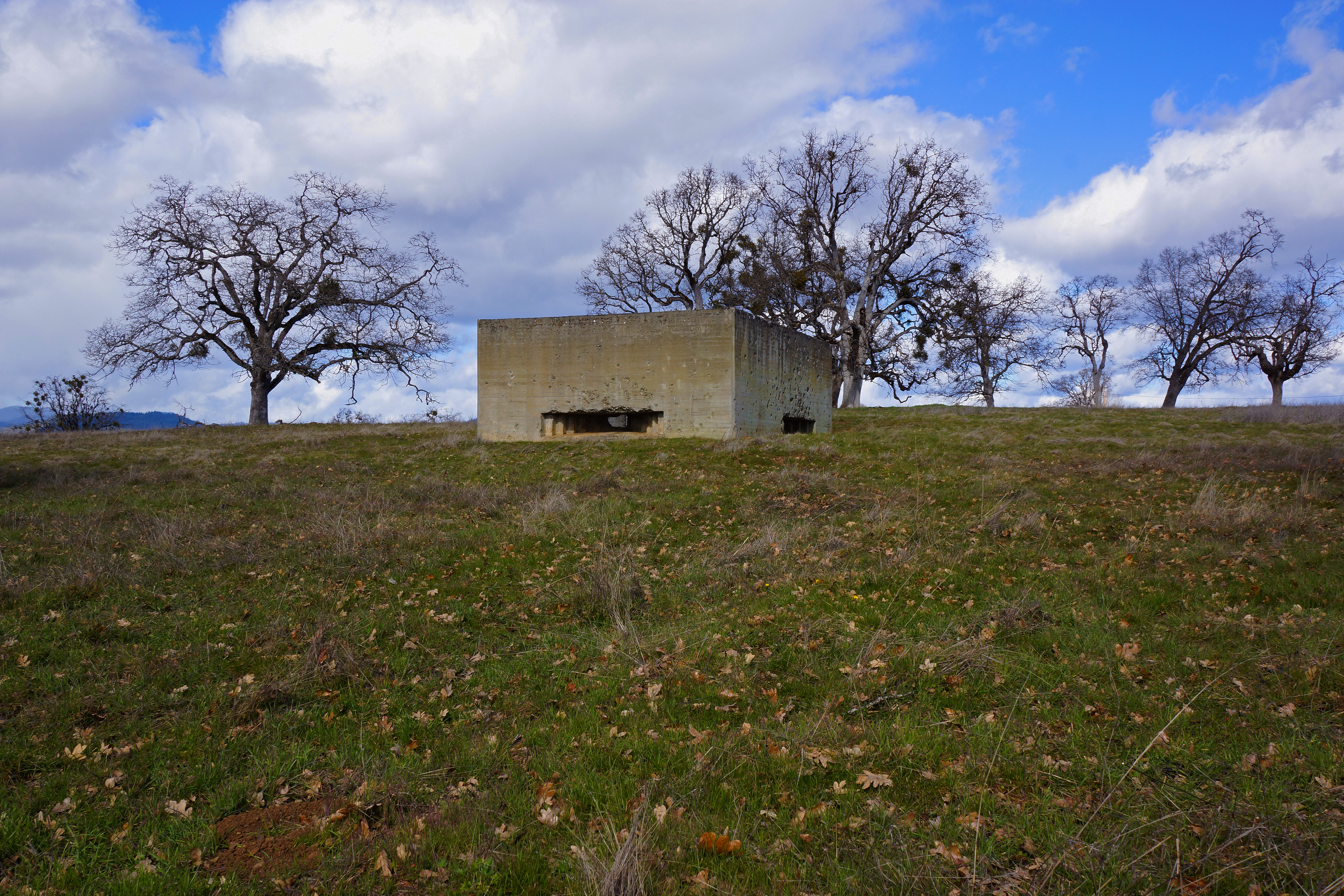
One of the concrete pillboxes on Upper Table Rock designed to simulate Nazi fortified coastal regions of Europe

Camp White was an Army training base located in Jackson County, Oregon, United States, during World War II. It was also the site of a prisoner-of-war (POW) camp. The camp was named in honor of George A. White, who served as adjutant general for Oregon starting in 1915.

== History ==
On December 12, 1941, five days after the attack on Pearl Harbor, Congress appropriated $27 million to transform the Agate Desert into Camp White. A portion of Upper Table Rock was also used for training. The camp was dedicated September 15, 1942. Many of the troops trained at Camp White participated in the Oregon Maneuver combat exercise in the fall of 1943. At its peak, the camp occupied nearly 50,000 acres and contained nearly 40,000 people, making it the second-largest city in Oregon at the time. The camp was deactivated in April 1946. There was a Camp White post office from 1942–60, when the name was changed to White City, the name of the civilian community that took Camp White's place.

== Documentary ==
The Camp White Story: Southern Oregon Goes to War is a documentary program produced by Southern Oregon Public Television (SOPTV) chronicling the transformation of rural Southern Oregon during World War II and focusing on the Camp White military facility. It is one of several programs produced by SOPTV documenting the history of Southern Oregon. The documentary chronicles the stories of the troops that were trained in this "Alcatraz of Boot Camps" and the impact of the military base on the Southern Oregon economy. This program was produced in cooperation with the Camp White Military Museum. It was written by Ashland freelancer John E. Darling.

== See also ==
- Denman Wildlife Area
- Charles H. Gerhardt
- List of POW camps in the United States
- List of United States Army installations
