= Zhejiang-Jiangxi campaign (1942) order of battle =

The Zhejiang-Jiangxi campaign was a military campaign fought from May to September 1942 as part of the Second Sino-Japanese War. This article in as order of battle, listing the present Chinese and Japanese military forces.

== Japan ==
China Expeditionary Force – General Shunroku Hata (畑俊六) (Late April, 1942)

- 13th Army – Lt. General Shigeru Sawada (沢田茂)
  - 15th Division – Lt. General Naotsugu Sakai (酒井直次) – KIA
    - 15th Infantry Group HQ
      - 51st Infantry Regiment
      - 60th Infantry Regiment
      - 67th Infantry Regiment
    - 21st Field Artillery Regiment
    - 15th Engineer Regiment
    - 15th Division Signal Unit
    - 15th Transport Regiment
  - 22nd Division – Lt. General Sanji Ōkido (大城戸三治)
    - 84th Infantry regiment
    - 85th Infantry regiment
    - 86th Infantry regiment
    - 52nd Mountain Artillery Regiment
    - 22nd Military Engineer Regiment
    - 22nd Transport Regiment
  - 32nd Division – Lt. General Tetsuzo Ide (井出鉄蔵 [3]) [2]
    - 32nd Infantry Group HQ
      - 210th Infantry Regiment
      - 211th Infantry Regiment
      - 212th Infantry Regiment
    - 32nd Armored Vehicle Squadron
    - 32nd Field Artillery Regiment
    - 32nd Engineer Regiment
    - 32nd Transport Regiment

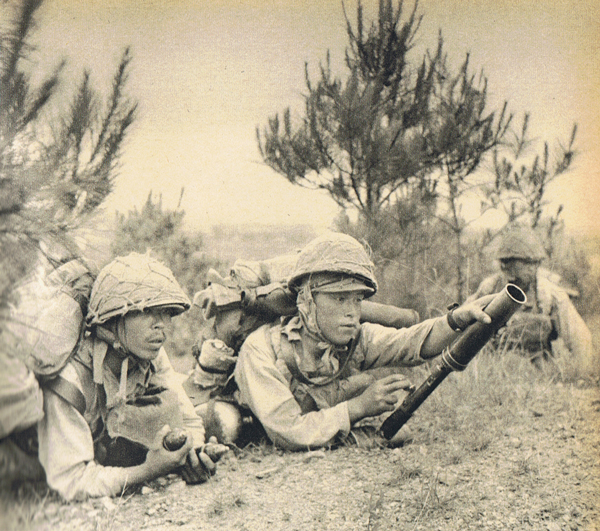
A Japanese soldier with 50mm heavy grenade discharger during the Zhejiang-Jiangxi Campaign, 30 May 1942.

  - 70th Division – Lt. General Takayuki Uchida (内田孝行)
    - 61st Infantry Brigade
      - 102nd Independent Infantry Battalion
      - 103rd Independent Infantry Battalion
      - 104th Independent Infantry Battalion
      - 105th Independent Infantry Battalion
    - 62nd Infantry Brigade
      - 121st Independent Infantry Battalion
      - 122nd Independent Infantry Battalion
      - 123rd Independent Infantry Battalion
      - 124th Independent Infantry Battalion
    - Labor troops
  - 116th Division – Lt. General Toshijiro Takeuchi (武内俊二郎)
    - 119th Infantry Brigade
      - 109th Infantry Regiment
      - 120th Infantry Regiment
    - 130th Infantry Brigade
      - 133rd Infantry Regiment
      - 138th Infantry Regiment
    - 120th Cavalry Battalion
    - 122nd Field Artillery Regiment
    - 116th Military Engineer Regiment
    - 116th Transport Regiment
  - 12th Independent Mixed Brigade – Major General Johkichi Nanbu – (南部襄吉) [2]
    - 51st Independent Infantry Battalion
    - 52nd Independent Infantry Battalion
    - 53rd Independent Infantry Battalion
    - 54th Independent Infantry Battalion
    - 55th Independent Infantry Battalion
    - artillery troops
    - labor troops
    - signal communication unit.
  - 13th Independent Mixed Brigade – Major General Haruo Yamamura (山村治雄) [2]
    - 56th Independent Infantry Battalion
    - 57th Independent Infantry Battalion
    - 58th Independent Infantry Battalion
    - 59th Independent Infantry Battalion
    - 60th Independent Infantry Battalion
    - artillery troops
    - labor troops
    - signal communication unit.
  - 17th Independent Mixed Brigade – Major General Hachiro Tagami (田上八郎) [2]
    - 87th Independent Infantry Battalion
    - 88th Independent Infantry Battalion
    - 89th Independent Infantry Battalion
    - 90th Independent Infantry Battalion
    - 91st Independent Infantry Battalion
    - artillery troops
    - labor troops
    - signal communication unit.
  - Directly under 13th Army
    - 3 Separate Artillery Regiments
    - 3 Separate Engineer Regiments
    - 1 Tank Battalion ?
    - 5 truck Regiments
    - 1 Road Construction Battalion

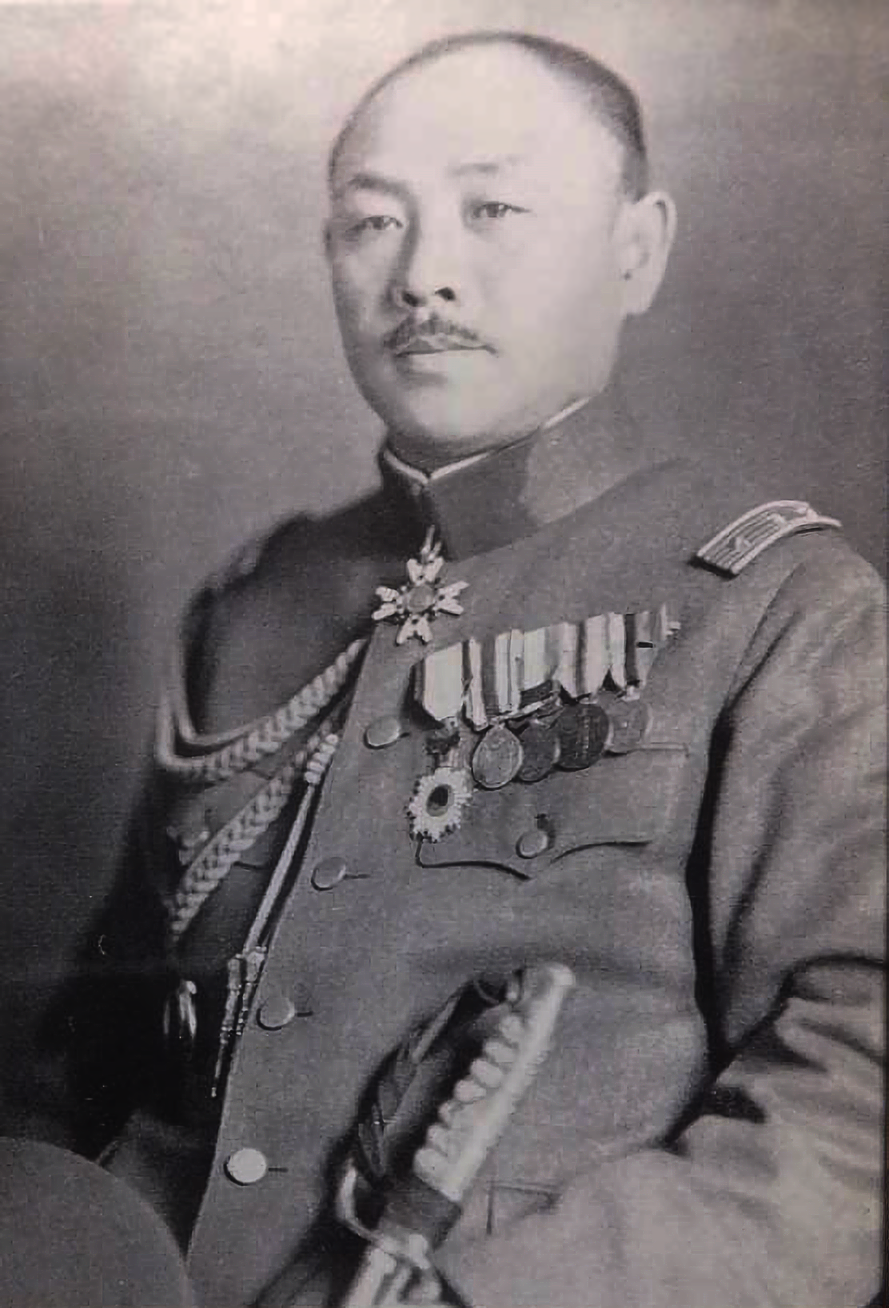
General Anami commanded the 11th Army, which advanced from Nánchāng to Fŭzhōu.

- 11th Army – Lt. General Korechika Anami (阿南惟幾)
  - 3rd Division – Lt. General Tagaji Takahashi (高橋多賀二)
    - 5th Infantry Brigade
      - 6th Infantry Regiment
      - 68th Infantry Regiment
    - 29th Infantry Brigade
      - 18th Infantry Regiment *
      - 34th Infantry Regiment
    - 3rd Field Artillery Regiment
    - 3rd Cavalry Regiment
    - 3rd Engineer Regiment
    - 3rd Transport Regiment
  - 34th Division – Lt. General Shigeru Ōga (大賀茂)
    - ?
  - Takehara Column – Major General Saburo Takehara (竹原三郎)
    - 4 Battalions from 6th Division
  - Imai Column – Colonel Takejiro Imai (今井亀次郎)
    - 3 inf Battalions/40th Div.
  - Ide Column – Colonel Tokutaro Ide (井出篤太郎)
    - 1 Infantry Battalion /68th Div.
  - Hirano Column – Colonel Giichi Hirano (平野儀一)
    - 1 Infantry Battalion /68th Div.

Airforce:

- 1st Air Group (第一飛行団)
  - 2 Recon flights
  - 1 Recon squadron
  - 1 Fighter squadron
  - 1 squadron Lt bombers
  - 1 squadron Hvy bombers

Notes:

- [1] 3rd Division was reorganized as a triangular Division in July. The 18th Infantry Regiment was removed and the remaining Infantry Regiments were subordinated under the 3rd Infantry Brigade Group.
- [2] 2nd, 6th and 9th Independent Tankette Companies participated in the campaign. But, 2nd and 6th were used in the sub-operation along Dongting Lake and 9th stayed at Nanchang for a feint operation.
- [3] 34th Recon Regiment participated in the main operation, but its tankette company was left behind and did not see action.

== China ==
3rd War Area - Ku Chu-tung

- 25th Army Group - Li Chueh
  - 88th Corps - Ho Shou-chou
    - New 21st Division
    - New 30th Division
    - 32nd Provincial Division
  - 9th Provincial Corps - Feng Sheng-fu
    - 33rd Provincial Division
    - 34th Provincial Division
    - 35th Provincial Division
- 10th Army Group - Wang Ching-chiu
  - 49th Corps - Wang Tieh-han
    - 26th Division
    - 105th Division
    - 13th Provincial Division
  - 79th Division
  - 53rd Division
- 32nd Army Group - ?
  - 25th Corps - Chang Wen-ching
    - 40th Division
    - 55th Division
    - 108th Division
  - 28th Corps - Tao Kuang
    - 62nd Division
    - 192nd Division
- 23rd Army Group - Tang Shih-tsun
  - 21st Corps - Liu Yu-ching
    - 146th Division
    - 147th Division
    - 148th Division
  - 50th Corps - Fan Tse-ying
    - 144th Division
    - 145th Division
    - New 7th Division
- 26th Corps - Ting Chih-pan
  - 32nd Division
  - 41st Division
  - 46th Division
- 86th Corps - Mo Yu-shuo
  - 16th Division
  - (less 79th Division)
  - 67th Division
- 74th Corps - Wang Yao-wu
  - 51st Division
  - 57th Division
  - 58th Division
- 100th Corps - Shih Chung-cheng
  - 19th Division
  - (less 63rd Division)
  - 75th Division
- 5th Reserve Division

9th War Area - ?

- 4th Corps
  - 59th Division
  - 90th Division
  - 100th Division
- 58th Corps
  - New 10th Division
  - New 11th Division
- 79th Corps
  - 98th Division
  - 194th Division
  - 6th Provincial Division

Airforce:

- ?

== Sources ==
- Hsu Long-hsuen and Chang Ming-kai, History of The Sino-Japanese War (1937–1945) 2nd Ed., 1971. Translated by Wen Ha-hsiung, Chung Wu Publishing; 33, 140th Lane, Tung-hwa Street, Taipei, Taiwan Republic of China.
- Generals of World War II
- 1億人の昭和史 『日本の戦史6 (日中戦争4)』 毎日新聞社, Mainichi Shimbunsha, 1979.
- 第32師団長
