= Battle of West Henan–North Hubei order of battle =

Battle during Sino-Japanese war

Below is the order of battle for the Western Henan - Northern Hubei Border Campaign, fought late March through late May 1945. It was one of the 22 major engagements between the National Revolutionary Army and the Imperial Japanese Army during the Second Sino-Japanese War.

== Japan ==
As of mid-March 1945

=== Northern Hubei Command ===
Sinnosuke Sasaki

39th Division ‒ Sumida
39th Infantry Brigade Group

231st Infantry Regiment
232nd Infantry Regiment
233rd Infantry Regiment

39th Recon regiment
39th Field Artillery Regiment
39th Engineer Regiment
39th Transport Regiment
5th Independent Mixed Brigade (elements) ‒ ?
16th Independent Infantry Battalion
17th Independent Infantry Battalion
18th Independent Infantry Battalion
19th Independent Infantry Battalion
20th Independent Infantry Battalion
artillery troops
labor troops.
11th Independent Mixed Brigade (elements)
Field Replacement Detachment (elements)
13 Armoured Cars

=== Western Henan Command (12th Army) ===
Lieutenant General Takashi Takamori

3rd Division (elements)
3rd Infantry Brigade Group

6th Infantry Regiment
68th Infantry Regiment
34th Infantry Regiment

3rd Field Artillery Regiment
3rd Cavalry Regiment
3rd Engineer Regiment
3rd Transport Regiment
69th Division (elements)
59th Infantry brigade

82nd, 83rd, 84th, 85th Independent Infantry Battalions

60th Infantry brigade

86th, 118th, 119th, 120th Independent Infantry Battalions

Signal communication unit
labor troops
transport team
110th Division
110th Infantry Regiment
139th Infantry Regiment
163rd Infantry Regiment
6th Field Artillery Regiment
Mountain Artillery squadron
40th Independent Engineer regiment
25th Transport Regiment
115th Division
85th Infantry Brigade

26th, 27, 28, 29 Independent Infantry Battalions

86th Infantry brigade

30th, 385, 386, 387 Independent Infantry Battalions

117th Division (elements)
87th Infantry brigade ‒ (headquarters Kaifeng)

203rd, 204th, 205th, 206th Independent Infantry Battalions

88th Infantry brigade (headquarters Zhengzhou)

388th, 389th, 390th, 391st Independent Infantry Battalions

11th Independent Mixed Brigade ‒ Takeo Miyashita
46th, 47th, 48th, 49th, 50th Independent Infantry Battalions
artillery troops
labor troops
signal communication unit.
14th Independent Mixed Brigade ‒ Yashikata Yoshikawa
61st, 62nd, 63rd, 64th, 65th Independent Infantry Battalions
artillery troops
labor troops
signal communication unit.
4th Cavalry Brigade –
4th Cavalry Regiment
25th Cavalry Regiment (in Huaiyang)
26th Cavalry Regiment (in 商邱)
3rd Tank Division (>100 tanks) (elements)
13th Tank Regiment
17th Tank Regiment
3rd Mobile Infantry regiment (in Lushan, Baofeng)
3rd mobile artillery regiment (in Xiangcheng, Lushan, Ye County)
Quick-firing artillery team (in Shan county)
reconnaissance troops (in Ye County)
labor troops (in Wang village)
AA team (in Ying bridge).

Military transport units (1,000+ transport vehicles)

== China ==
As of mid-March 1945

=== First War Area ===
Hu Zongnan (acting)

31st Group Army ‒ Wang Zhonglian

27th Army ‒ Hsieh Fusan

47th Division
4th Provincial Division
28th Division
64th Provincial Division (uncommitted)

78th Army ‒ Lai Ju-hsiung

New 42nd Division
New 43rd Division
New 44th Division

85th Army ‒ Wu Shao-chao

23rd Division
110th Division
55th Provincial Division

89th Army

62nd Provincial Division
New 1st Division

4th Group Army ‒ Pei Chang-hui (acting)

38th Army ‒ Chang Yao-ming

17th Division
New 35th Division ?

96th Army ‒ Li Hsing-chung

(main force) New 35th Division ?
(main force) 117th Division

90th Army ‒ Yen Ming

61st Division
7th Division (from 3rd Army)

40th Army ‒ Ma Fa-wu

39th Division
106th Division
New 40th Division

Western Henan Garrison ‒ Liu Ju-ming
15th Army ‒ Wu Ting-lin

64th Division
65th Division
55th Provincial Division (97th Army)

=== Hebei-Chahar War Area ===
Kao Shu-hsun

New 8th Army ‒ Hu Po-han

New 6th Division
29th Provincial Division

=== Fifth War Area ===
Liu Zhi

North Hubei Right Force (33rd Group Army) ‒ Feng Zhi'an

59th Army ‒ Liu Chen-san

38th Division
180th Division
53rd Division

77th Army ‒ Ho Chi-feng

132nd Division
179th Division

69th Army ‒ Mi Wen-ho

181st Division
28th Provincial Division

Western Henan Left Force (2nd Group Army) ‒ Liu Ruming

55th Army ‒ Tsao Fu-lin

29th Division
74th Division
81st Division

68th Army ‒ Liu Ju-chen

119th Division
143rd Division
36th Provincial Division

Western Henan Center Force (22nd Group Army) ‒ Sun Zhen

41st Army ‒ Tseng Su-sheng

122nd Division
124th Division

45th Army ‒ Chen Ting-hsun

125th Division
127th Division

47th Army ‒ Li Tsung-fang

104th Division
178th Division
1st Provisional Army

16th Artillery Regiment
4th Engineer Regiment

=== Tenth War Area ===
Li Pin-hsien

Army in Response ‒ Fu Li-ping

9th Provisional Army

3rd Division
4th Replacement Division
13th Replacement Division
20th Replacement Division
27th Provincial Division
173rd Division

Note: A total of 148,000 men and 4 Airforce groups.

== Sources ==
- Hsu Long-hsuen and Chang Ming-kai, History of The Sino-Japanese War (1937–1945) 2nd Ed., 1971. Translated by Wen Ha-hsiung, Chung Wu Publishing; 33, 140th Lane, Tung-hwa Street, Taipei, Taiwan Republic of China. Pg. 452-57. Map 43.
- 抗日战争时期的侵华日军序列沿革 (Order of battle of the Japanese army that invaded China during the Sino Japanese War)
