= 114th Division (Imperial Japanese Army) =

- Active: 1937 - 1945
- Country: Empire of Japan
- Branch: Imperial Japanese Army
- Type: Infantry
- Garrison/HQ: Utsunomiya
- Nickname: Commander Division
- Engagements: Battle of Shanghai; Battle of Nanking; Battle of Xuzhou; Battle of Northern and Eastern Henan; Chinese Civil War

Commanders
- Notable commanders: Saburou Miura

The 114th Division (第114師団, Dai-hyakujūyon Shidan) was an infantry division of the Imperial Japanese Army. Its call sign was Commander Division (将兵団, Shou Heidan). It was formed on 12 October 1937 in Utsunomiya, Tochigi as a B-class square division. The nucleus for the formation was the 14th Division headquarters. It was originally subordinated to the Central China Area Army.

== First formation ==
In October 1937 the division was subordinated to the Tenth Army and sent to ongoing Battle of Shanghai. It departed from Osaka 30 October and arrived in Hangzhou Bay on 5 November 1937, spending the next five days unloading, due to faulty landing craft. It also participated in Battle of Nanking in December 1937. In February 1938, the division was transferred to the North China Area Army and participated in the Battle of Xuzhou and Battle of Northern and Eastern Henan. Later performing a garrison duties in the North China, the division was demobilized in July 1939. From the start of the Second Sino-Japanese War until its return to Japan in September 1939, the 114th Division suffered 906 killed, 198 dead from illnesses, and 2,527 wounded.

== Second formation ==
Because the 26th and 62nd divisions were sent to Pacific War, the 114th was reformed 10 July 1944 in Linfen, simultaneously with the 115th, 117th and 118th divisions. As a security (class C) division, its backbone consisted of independent infantry battalions, and division lacked an artillery regiment. The nucleus for the formation was the 3rd Independent Infantry Brigade in Yuncheng and 69th division in North China. The unit was originally assigned to the First Army. It then garrisoned the Linfen area of Shanxi along the Tongpu Railroad, taking over all of the 69th Division garrisoned territory. By the start of Soviet invasion of Manchuria 9 August 1945, the 114th division was on move in Tianjin. After World War II ended with the surrender of Japan 15 August 1945, a significant fraction of its men have continued to fight under command of the warlord Yan Xishan in the ongoing Chinese Civil War.

== See also ==
- List of Japanese Infantry Divisions

== Notes ==
- This article incorporates material from Japanese Wikipedia page 第114師団 (日本軍), accessed 15 June 2016
