= Suzhou-Jiaxing-Shanghai Suppression Campaign (1942) =

Battle of the Second Sino-Japanese War

- Part of the Second Sino-Japanese War
Date	February 20 – March 18, 1942 (3 weeks and 5 days)
Location	Eastern part of the Suzhou-Jiaxing line in China
Result	Japanese victory

Belligerents
China	Japan

Commanders and leaders
(Republic of China (1912–1949)) Gu Zhutong (Republic of China (1912–1949)) Ruan Qingyuan	(Empire of Japan) Shigeru Sawada

Units involved
(Republic of China (1912–1949)) National Revolutionary Army; Loyal and Patriotic Army; Suzhou-Jiaxing-Shanghai Advance Column; Local government troops	Imperial Japanese Army; 13th Army; Shanghai Guard Unit (Note: Formed in early 1939 in response to guerrilla activities. Troops were drawn from various army divisions with each contributing as few as one company to as many as one battalion.); 22nd Division; 11th Independent Mixed Brigade; Imperial Japanese Navy; Naval Landing Force

Strength
30,000 to 40,000 (Weng Yangzheng's claim) (Note: Most were local government troops. The units that made up the Suzhou-Jiaxing-Shanghai Advance Column had a total of approximately 5,000 troops in May 1941.)	Over 5,000 (contemporary Chinese report)

Casualties and losses
Chinese claims : extremely heavy casualties. Japanese claims (by March 15) : 3,500 killed, 1,521 captured, 31 surrendered.	Japanese claims : 3 killed, 8 wounded.
- See Luxu-Xinta-Beiku massacre

The Suzhou-Jiaxing-Shanghai Suppression Campaign, also known as the second phase of Operation No. 18 of the Japanese Thirteenth Army, was a sweeping campaign implemented in February 1942 to destroy the 3rd Regiment of Dai Li's Loyal and Patriotic Army, which was the main unit of Ruan Qingyuan's Suzhou-Jiaxing-Shanghai Advance Column. The operation, including the killings and torture of non-combatants, largely ended by March 14 according to Chinese post-war sources while the Japanese Army reported its end on March 15 with a minor sweep done on March 18.

== Background ==
=== Formation of the Loyal and Patriotic Army ===
When the Battle of Shanghai broke out in August 1937, Chiang Kai-shek ordered Dai Li to form a special forces unit to support the National Revolutionary Army in its actions. On the night of August 15, Dai Li personally went to Shanghai to discuss with various influential local figures, in particular Du Yuesheng, on forming and combining civilian armed forces as a guerilla force to do sabotage work. At the end of the month, the "Jiangsu-Zhejiang Action Committee" was established. By September, in addition to several training units, the special forces unit had over 10,800 officers and soldiers in seventeen regular battalions and one special forces battalion from five detachments which were all deployed to Shanghai. The Luanyu guerilla force with over 2,000 troops was also formed near Tianjin and was reorganized into the "Northern Detachment" with Wang Tianmu as its commander and Chen Gongshu as deputy commander. The total strength of the Jiangsu-Zhejiang Action Committee had reached approximately 13,000.

In November 1937, the five detachments were all engaged in fierce fighting in the Shanghai battlefield. The 4th Detachment was completely wiped out covering the retreat of the National Revolutionary Army on the south bank of the Suzhou River. The Songjiang training class was subjected to enemy airstrikes and was reduced to no more than 50 survivors out of over 500. The 5th Detachment and portions of the 2nd and 3rd Detachments, totaling as many as 5,000 troops, were deployed to Nanshi and were ordered by Dai Li to follow in the footsteps of the "Eight Hundred Heroes" and hold Nanshi to the last man alongside Zhang’s brigade of the 55th Division. However, after a plea from Du Yuesheng, Dai Li negotiated with French authorities to facilitate the retreat of the Nanshi defenders into their safety zone. The French Consulate agreed as long as the Chinese troops were disarmed in accordance with international law. After three days of bitter fighting, the remnants of the special forces troops received the order to abandon their positions and withdrew to the French Concession where they handed over their weapons. After the battle of Shanghai, six recovery teams were dispatched from Nantong to assemble the scattered troops of the special forces unit. Except for the 5th Detachment in the French Concession and the 1st Detachment behind Japanese lines guerrilla fighting in Pudong, only approximately 1,700 or 2,000 troops from the 2nd and 3rd Detachments and the training units were accommodated. In December 1937, they withdrew to Likou Town in Anhui Province for training and reorganization.

On March 13, 1938, Dai Li received a telegraph from Chiang Kai-shek ordering him to gather and reorganize scattered NRA soldiers in Pudong and along the Nanjing-Shanghai and Shanghai-Hangzhou highway to strengthen guerilla warfare behind enemy lines, which the Nationalists were already beginning to focus on as early as January 1938. In May 1938, the "Jiangsu-Zhejiang Action Committee" was officially renamed to the "Loyal and Patriotic Army" which grew to over 10,000 troops strong. The guerilla unit was composed not only of the remnants of the special forces unit and scattered NRA soldiers, but also local armed forces, former collaborationist troops, and outlaws in the Shanghai-Nanjing area willing to accept reorganization. The most famous case of the latter was Huang Bamei, a notorious salt smuggler who had been arrested as a bandit but released with the help of a benefactor. After the Japanese landing of Jinshanwei in November 1937, she closed up her shop and formed an anti-Japanese force.

Among the units, Wang Tianmu's Luanyu guerilla force had grown to fifteen detachments with over 5,000 troops by the end of December 1937. Moreover, there were over 26,000 collaborationist policemen and scattered soldiers it had connection with. From November 30 to December 10, the guerilla force along with local units took part in a number of actions in Hebei and Chahar during which the 1st Detachment commander was captured by the Japanese.

In early 1938, deputy commander Chen Gongshu of the Tianjin station of the Kuomintang Blue Shirts Society ordered Chen Weifan, a local of Baodi County and a graduate of the Baoding Military Academy, to form the Seventh Route Army of the Nationalist Government's Loyal and Patriotic Army. The route army grew to several hundred strong after Chen Weifan organized a peasant uprising but was defeated and temporarily disbanded due to Japanese and Collaborationist Chinese's mopping-up operations. In July 1938, the Communists led the East Hebei Great Uprising and the Seventh Route Army, now 2,000 troops strong, attacked and captured Baodi on July 14, 1938, a victory which caused its ranks to swell to 10,000 which was soon reorganized into twelve divisions. Right before the East Hebei Great Uprising took place, Chen Gongshu had also ordered Weng Wan, another local of Baodi, to form the Ninth Route Army which expanded to 5,000 with the inclusion of uprising troops reorganized into three brigades and one independent regiment. After the capture of Baodi, the Japanese and Collaborationist Chinese Armies launched a counterattack and drove the Seventh Route Army out of Baodi, pursuing them relentlessly and inflicting heavy casualties. By early 1939, most of the route army had disbanded or disintegrated. The Ninth Route Army had also been defeated by the end of 1938. Some commanders led what remained of their troops to join the Eighth Route Army. After the collapse of their units, Chen Weifan and Weng Wan were killed in action in Tianjin and Beijing respectively. By the end of 1938, the entire Northern Detachment had been annihilated after being besieged by the Japanese Army near Baodi.

By the spring of 1940, the Loyal and Patriotic Army had under its command four columns established in Pudong, Shanghai and one Nanjing Corps, totalling 29,611 troops and 17,785 rifles and pistols in twenty-six detachments and two battalions directly subordinated under the army. They were active around the Shanghai, Nanjing, and Hangzhou areas committing sabotage, assassinations, and political works against traitors and collaborationist troops. By May 1941, the Loyal and Patriotic Army had approximately 10,000 troops and 5,029 guns, including 1,374 troops from the headquarters and directly subordinated units, 1,502 troops from the 1st Teaching Regiment and the Jiangyin-Wuxi-Changshu Special Forces Unit (the latter being composed of former collaborationist troops) that would form the Jiangyin-Wuxi Advance Column, 1,480 troops from the 2nd Teaching Regiment and 2nd Teaching Corps which would form the Wuxi-Wujin-Yixing Advance Column, 207 troops from the headquarters of the Suzhou-Jiaxing-Shanghai Advance Corps and its directly subordinated units, 1,946 troops from the 3rd Teaching Regiment, Shanghai Corps, and 1st Teaching Corps which would later be reorganized into the Suzhou-Jiaxing-Shanghai Advance Corps along with approximately 2,700 to 2,800 local militia troops newly reorganized into a self-defense corps under Ruan Qingyuan's command, 288 troops from the Nanjing Corps which would be reorganized into the Nanjing-Danyang-Liyang Advance Column, and 500 troops from two other detachments.

=== Ruan Qingyuan and the Suzhou-Jiaxing-Shanghai Advance Corps ===
Ruan Qingyuan was a career soldier, having served as a private for Sun Chuanfang's army in his teenage years. He went on to work as a police officer under the Kuomintang and then a special forces member under Dai Li, participating in the Fifth Encirclement Campaign against the Communists. During the Xi'an incident, he was nearly caught by rebels but escaped safely. After the Battle of Shanghai in 1937, Ruan Qingyuan attempted to assassinate collaborationist lawyer Chen Zemin in Shanghai but was betrayed and arrested by the police. He was able to talk his way out of an attempted murder charge and was sentenced to only several months of imprisonment for endangering public safety.

==== Aijia Bridge "Great Victory" ====
After his release from prison, Ruan Qingyuan gathered several dozen Kuomintang soldiers scattered during the Battle of Shanghai and joined the 5th Detachment of what was now the Loyal and Patriotic Army. In June 1938, Ruan Qingyuan set up an ambush near Aijia Bridge in Jiangyin with several dozen troops. As a company of a hundred Japanese soldiers was passing through the bridge by boat, the Chinese guerrillas threw grenades and claimed to have wiped out most of them, with only twenty-eight claimed to have escaped. Ruan Qingyuan gained much acclaim for the ambush and became the leader of the 5th Detachment. However, due to conflicts with the Communists which resulted in heavy casualties on the 6th and 10th Detachments of the Loyal and Patriotic Army in the area, Ruan Qingyuan's troops were forced to abandon the Jiangyin-Wuxi-Changshu guerrilla base soon after.

According to 10th Group Army commander Liu Jianxu's report on July 24, 1938 based on the 45th Independent Brigade commander's report on July 17, two companies of the independent brigade and the Loyal and Patriotic Army ambushed 140 Japanese troops passing through the Aijia Bridge by boat from Jiangyin on July 15. In the ensuing battle, the Chinese claimed to have killed over 80 Japanese troops and captured 2 soldiers along with 12 rifles. The 45th Independent Brigade suffered 4 killed and 1 wounded and the Loyal and Patriotic Army suffered 4 killed and 9 wounded.

==== Frictions with the New Fourth Army ====
After the establishment of the Shanghai Corps of the Loyal and Patriotic Army, there were frequent clashes between Ruan Qingyuan's troops and the Communist New Fourth Army in the Jiangyin-Wuxi-Changshu area. At this time, the Shanghai Corps compromising the 5th, 6th, and 10th Detachments was bolstered with the transfer of the 1st and 2nd Detachments and the establishment of an intelligence battalion. At the night of December 20, 1939, the Loyal and Patriotic Army claimed that Chen Yi's New Fourth Army took advantage of the Japanese attacks on the Loyal and Patriotic Army by gathering four regiments to besiege the 2nd Detachment at Anzhen, Wuxi. The Loyal and Patriotic Army sent in reinforcements from the 5th and 10th Detachments to engage the Communists which allowed the 2nd Detachment to break out of the encirclement. However, the Japanese Army also took the opportunity of the infighting between two Chinese parties to launch an attack. The New Fourth Army quickly retreated and the Loyal and Patriotic Army bore the brunt of the assault. In this battle, the Nationalists claimed that the Communists had used human wave tactic to attack the Loyal and Patriotic Army which was claimed to have resulted in nearly 1,000 Communist losses compared to no more than 200 from the Loyal and Patriotic Army.

In their book "Dai Li and the Bureau of Investigation and Statistics", Jiang Shaozhen, who believed that Chiang Kai-shek had implemented a policy of passive resistance against Japan and active anti-communism during the war and that the Loyal and Patriotic Army was formed under the guise of anti-Japanese resistance to counter the growth of the New Fourth Army's base areas, offered a different interpretation of the events of the battle. They claimed that the Loyal and Patriotic Army had repeatedly attacked the New Fourth Army and the Jiangnan Anti-Japanese Volunteer Army which conveniently helped the Japanese and Collaborationists in their mopping-up operations. However, because the Loyal and Patriotic Army was still under the banner of anti-Japanese resistance, they were also attacked by the Japanese and Collaborationist armies. Jiang Shaozhen claimed that it was the 5th and 10th Detachments of the Loyal and Patriotic Army which attacked the Communists first but was then surrounded by Japanese and Collaborationist troops in Anzhen and was able to break through with the support of the 2nd Detachment after suffering over 200 casualties.

The New Fourth Army recorded several notable engagements with the Loyal and Patriotic Army during the war. On June 3, 1939, the Jiangnan Anti-Japanese Volunteer Army claimed to have annihilated two battalions of the 10th Detachment at Yanjia bridge in Wuxi County while suffering zero casualties. In September 1941, the 18th Brigade of the 6th Division claimed to have killed or wounded over 100 troops of the 1st Teaching Regiment and the 2nd Teaching Corps including corps commander Mei Mingzhang. (Note: According to Dai Li's historical documents, the 1st Teaching Regiment and 2nd Teaching Corps suffered heavy casualties in this battle against Communist troops on September 22, 1941 including the death of corps commander Mei Mingzhang.) From late November to mid-December 1942, the New Fourth Army claimed to have captured or scattered most of the over 2,000 troops under Ai Qingzhang of the Loyal and Patriotic Army with over 100 willing to be integrated into the New Fourth Army. From February until June 1945, the New Fourth Army launched multiple operations at the Tianmu Mountain, claiming to have annihilated over 1,700 troops of the 62nd Division and the Loyal and Patriotic Army in the first anti-stubborn campaign, over 1,700 troops from various units of the Third War Zone including the Loyal and Patriotic Army in the second, and 6,922 troops from Third War Zone in the third while suffering 820 casualties.

==== Tianma train derailment ====
On November 29, 1940, collaborationist leader Wang Jingwei planned to sign the "Sino-Japanese Treaty" and the "Joint Declaration by Japan, China, and Manchukuo" in Nanjing which marked the formal recognition of the collaborationist state of Manchukuo in exchange for Japan's formal recognition of Wang Jingwei's government. Japanese and collaborationist personnel from Shanghai planned to travel to Nanjing via the "Tianma" train to attend the signing ceremony which was publicized greatly. In response, Dai Li ordered the Suzhou station to blow up the train to send a message to the collaborationist government.

At the night of November 29, Gu Wei and Wang Zhongqing led a demolition team to plant explosives near the Weiting station. Zhan Zongxiang and Xue Yao were tasked with pressing the trigger. As the train passed through the designated location, the explosives detonated accurately and blew up the front carriage and caused the train to derail. Zhan Zongxiang and Xue Yao came out of their hiding spot to observe the result firsthand but were spotted by escorting Japanese troops who opened fire. The two operators died in the line of duty. This sabotage act right at the middle of the Shanghai-Nanjing railway was widely reported by foreign news agencies and the Chinese claimed that it resulted in over 100 Japanese and collaborationist personnel including several high-ranking ones to be killed or wounded.

The Japanese military reported that there were approximately 100 killed or wounded as a result of this sabotage and claimed that most of the casualties were Chinese coolies who were in the only train carriage to have been destroyed. Many of the Chinese and Japanese officials who were supposed to be in this train had instead waited for a later one and thus were not in any risk of harm.

==== Development of the Suzhou-Jiaxing-Shanghai Advance Corps ====
After the South Anhui Incident in January 1941, the Loyal and Patriotic Army split its forces into the occupied areas of Shanghai and Nanjing in four routes. The Suzhou-Jiaxing-Shanghai Advance Corps, with Ruan Qingyuan's 3rd Detachment and the Shanghai Corps as its core, operated in the areas of Suzhou, Jiaxing and Shanghai east of Taihu Lake. The Jiangyin-Wuxi-Changshu Advance Column, with the 1st Detachment as its core, operated in the Yangcheng Lake, Changshu, and Kunshan areas. The Wuxi-Wujin-Yixing Advance Column, with the 2nd Detachment at its core, operated in the Yixing, Wuxi, Changzhou, and Jiangyin areas, and the last and fourth route, the Nanjing-Danyang-Liyang Advance Column with the Nanjing Corps as its core, operated in the Nanjing, Jiangpu, and Danyang areas. These four routes all engaged in fierce battles with the Japanese, Collaborationist, and Communist armies.

On March 25, 1941, the 2nd Battalion of the 3rd Teaching Regiment engaged in a battle with Japanese troops which resulted in the wounding, capture, and death of battalion commander Jiang Zuocheng and the annihilation of the 4th and 5th Companies. Gu Zhutong, the commander-in-chief of the Third War Zone, reported on April 14, 1941 the losses of the 2nd Battalion of the 3rd Teaching Regiment in the battle at the Qingpu area on March 25 as thirty-eight including the deputy battalion commander killed, thirty wounded, and forty-three including battalion commander Jiang Zuocheng missing or captured. On April 26, while leading his troops into combat against Japanese and Collaborationist troops, the deputy corps commander of the Shanghai Corps was killed in action. These two battles had resulted in considerable losses on Ruan Qingyuan's troops. Throughout the months of guerrilla activities, the Suzhou-Jiaxing-Shanghai Advance Corps continued to expand. By September 1941, the battalions of the 3rd Teaching Regiment had been reorganized into three detachments, the three companies of the Shanghai Corps had been reorganized into three battalions, there was an additional independent battalion, and a self-defense corps had been formed with 2,700 to 2,800 troops from local militias.

==== Supporting the Western allies in the Pacific War ====
On December 8, 1941, the Japanese military launched a surprise attack on Pearl Harbour and declared war on the United Kingdom and the United States. Dai Li immediately contacted Ruan Qingyuan to discuss a major operation in Shanghai during the Lunar New Year. On January 14, 1942, the Suzhou-Jiaxing-Shanghai Advance Corps deployed its sabotage and assault units to damage and destroy railway tracks and artillery pieces while attacking Japanese troops. At the same time, the arson unit infiltrated the foreign concessions now occupied by Japan and set multiple targets on fire. As the police and fire stations were busy putting out the flames, a number of prominent British and American citizens escaped into Ruan Qingyuan's guerrilla zone in Qingpu and were escorted to Chongqing and returned to their home countries. This Lunar New Year's Eve attack was claimed to be the reason why the Japanese Army would conduct a month-long major mopping-up operation against the Loyal and Patriotic Army.

On the other side, Jiang Shaozhen, citing Qiao Jiacai's book, believed that this Lunar New Year's Eve attack on Shanghai was only to demonstrate that the Loyal and Patriotic Army still existed. They claimed that the raid posed no real threat on the Japanese and only brought panic to the Shanghai citizens. The guerrilla troops only randomly fired a few shots and killed several pack horses before fleeing but Dai Li boasted that this attack showed that vast areas around Shanghai were under the control of the Nationalists. Instead, this operation prompted the Japanese Army to immediately launch a brutal large-scale mopping-up operation in the Suzhou-Jiaxing-Shanghai area.

=== Previous Japanese campaigns ===
After the Chinese winter offensive of 1939, the Japanese Thirteenth Army continued its suppression campaigns against the Chinese Third War Zone in Zhejiang, Jiangsu, and Anhui. Some notable mopping-up operations were the Jiangnan Operation in October 1940 and the West Lake Tai Operation in March 1941. In April 1941, the Thirteenth Army had also launched an invasion of eastern Zhejiang.

In late March 1940, the Japanese Army assessed that the five detachments of the Loyal and Patriotic Army and the six detachments of the Communist New Fourth Army both had 'C' ratings in combat effectiveness. By late July the combat capability of the New Fourth had gone up to a 'B' while the Loyal and Patriotic Army had been downgraded to a 'D' in the eyes of the Japanese Army.

On December 20, 1941, the Thirteenth Army launched the Anhui-Zhejiang Operation (also known as Operation No. 17) in two phases. By January 3, 1942, the army had reported suffering 82 killed and 261 wounded while claiming 2,307 abandoned enemy corpses and 216 enemy POWs. The Thirteenth Army also reported the capture of 2 mortars, 9 heavy machine guns, 22 light machine guns, 353 rifles, 8 pistols, 11 grenade launchers, and 123 bayonets. (Note: The "History of the Anti-Japanese War" recorded that in major guerrilla actions from December 19, 1941 to January 15, 1942 against the Thirteenth Army in Anhui, Jiangsu, and Zhejiang, the Third War Zone suffered a total of 1,830 killed, 1,783 wounded, and 849 missing while claiming to have killed or wounded over 4,900 Japanese troops. The Chinese Army also reported the capture of 2 Japanese soldiers, 59 rifles, 2 pistols, 2 bayonets, and 3 grenade launchers but lost 882 rifles, 5 heavy machine guns, 56 light machine guns, 36 pistols, 370 bayonets, 2 mortars, and 18 grenade launchers. The 2nd Advance Column also suffered 27 killed, 51 wounded, and 32 missing in late December 1941 that were not included in the "History of the Anti-Japanese War".)

In early February 1942, the Thirteenth Army began the first phase Operation No. 18, intending to mop-up the Loyal and Patriotic Army and possibly Communist forces in western Jiangyin. By February 15, the Thirteenth Army had reportedly captured 241 POWs and disarmed another 198 from a self-defense unit while suffering 3 killed and 6 wounded. Of those captured, 9 officers, 2 warrant officers, and 155 NCOs and soldiers were from the Loyal and Patriotic Army. Spoils of war included 300 rifles, 11 light machine guns, 1 heavy machine gun, 1 grenade launcher, 40 pistols, 24 bayonets, and 209 swords. The second phase of the operation were to begin on February 21 with the objective of surrounding and annihilating the 3rd Regiment of the Loyal and Patriotic Army.

== Operation process ==
On February 21, with the cooperation of a portion of the Imperial Japanese Navy, the Thirteenth Army deployed the bulk of the Shanghai Guard Unit and portions of the 22nd Division and 11th Independent Mixed Brigade to sweep the Suzhou-Jiaxing area. They made rapid progress in overrunning and destroying the headquarters of the 3rd Regiment while mopping-up Chinese units along the way. By February 25, the Japanese units were clearing positions in search for enemy troops who had scattered and hid in the area.

Contemporary Chinese reports recorded that over 5,000 Japanese troops advanced from Suzhou, Jiaxing, and Lake Shi to launch an assault on the main force of the Suzhou-Jiaxing-Shanghai Advance Column before conducting house-to-house searches on February 20 along with over 180 boats. After receiving the report, the column headquarters ordered the Independent Battalion under its direct command to block Japanese troops at Tianningzhuang and Qi's battalion of the 3rd Teaching Regiment to block Japanese troops at Tongli and, if necessary, withdraw while maintaining contact with the Shanghai Corps. The Independent Battalion engaged in a series of delaying actions against Japanese forces from Jiaxing and Shanghai towards Beiku until they ran out of ammunition and supplies by the evening at which point they withdrew and dispersed. Qi's battalion was surrounded by Japanese troops at the southern shore of Lake Cheng. With no hope of breaking out, the battalion commander shot his wife and daughter before dying for the country. (Note: Shen Wenbao, at the time a elementary student at Luxu Town who had a good impression of Ruan Qingyuan and the discipline and the anti-Japanese activities of the men and women of his troops especially compared to other guerrilla units in the area, also recalled that during the large-scale mopping-up operation against Ruan Qingyuan's troops in February 1942, platoon commander Qi killed his wife and child before dying for his country after failing to break out. They also recalled the last stand of a female soldier who cursed at the Japanese before she was martyred.) It was claimed that the Japanese were so impressed by his loyalty that they took away his remains to conduct a memorial service.

After several days of bitter fighting, the situation had deteriorated to a point that the headquarters of the Suzhou-Jiaxing-Shanghai Advance Column were unable to make contact with either commander Ruan Qingyuan or most of the troops who were dispersed over a wide area. A portion of the troops broke through the west side of the Suzhou-Jiaxing road but were then surrounded while the troops at the eastern side of the road were embroiled in chaotic fighting. The troops were unable to break out of the tightening encirclement and all captured officers and soldiers were reportedly massacred.

The guerilla base of the advance column was completely destroyed. Most of the 3rd Regiment and thirty to forty thousand local government troops were lost in the twenty-nine day siege, with no more than five hundred breaking through the encirclement and fleeing from the occupied areas to Lake Tai. Weng Yangzheng, commander of a training class of the later Sino-American Cooperative Organization, recalled that Ruan Qingyuan personally told him that over forty radio stations were lost. Ruan Qingyuan himself was able to escape.

The Thirteenth Army reported that the main force of the 3rd Regiment of the Loyal and Patriotic Army had been wiped out by March 15, 1942 and the operation had thus concluded. Equipment captured in this campaign included 942 rifles, 7 automatic rifles, 102 pistols, 33 bayonets, 4 heavy machine guns, 33 light machine guns, 1 grenade launcher, 20 rifle-based grenade launchers, 1 mortar, and 11 landmines along with 1,821 military uniforms. The army also claimed that 89 Chinese cadres and officers were killed or captured. On March 18, in order to root out the remaining troops of the Loyal and Patriotic Army and a secret organization of the Chongqing government who had hid in the Shanghai International Settlement, the main force of the Shanghai Guard Unit (approximately three battalions strong) along with the Naval Landing Force conducted a sweep with prior understanding from the French and Italian authorities of the concession. The operation ended in the afternoon with the capture of the chairman of the Nanjing City Party Committee of the Chongqing Government, one member of the Loyal and Patriotic Army, and fifty suspects.

== Luxu-Xinta-Beiku massacre ==
After Ruan Qingyuan's troops "collapsed without a fight", Japanese troops conducted village-to-village searches for "plainclothes soldiers" around the Luxu, Xinta, Beiku, and Zhouzhuang areas of Wujiang County while the Japanese navy maintained a strict blockade. Various eyewitnesses and survivors of the massacre recalled that Japanese troops rounded up not only members of the Loyal and Patriotic Army and security chiefs but in some places all able-bodied young men or students. For twenty days, many of these men and women were tortured, bayoneted, burned, boiled, drowned, or buried alive. Civilians attempting to rescue victims or were accused of hiding Chinese soldiers were also shot or bayoneted. Xinta was the most affected by the Japanese atrocities and many of its surrounding villages were scorched. According to incomplete statistics, approximately 300 were massacred in Beiku, with 200 corpses found buried outside Liu's residence alone. During the twenty day sweep, as many as 100 civilians were killed in Lili.

At the time, the exact number of massacre victims is impossible to ascertain. Based on eyewitness accounts, it was estimated that approximately 1,500 were massacred in twenty days, including over 300 in Xinta, over 200 in Luxu, over 300 in Beiku, and over 200 in Zhouzhuang. According to statistics found in the Wujiang County archives, a total of 2,373 soldiers and civilians perished in the "mop-up", a figure that was adopted by the book "A Record of the Japanese Army’s Atrocities during the Invasion of China" as the true number of victims of the Luxu-Xinta-Beiku Massacre. Considering the total population of all four areas were at just slightly over 40,000, the proportion of deaths in this massacre was considerable.

Other sources gave a much larger figure of massacre victims. Qiao Jiacai believed that 10,000 soldiers and civilians were massacred or injured in the one-month sweep. This figure was also used in other sources pertaining to the Loyal and Patriotic Army. Gu Zhutong's contemporary report claimed that after the main force of the Suzhou-Jiaxing-Shanghai Advance Column had dispersed on February 22, over 5,000 soldiers and civilians were massacred, over 10,000 were tortured, and over 1,000 houses were burned in Japanese Army sweeps across villages.

== Aftermath ==
In April 1942, the Thirteenth Army planned to launch its next operation against the Third War Zone in Ningguo and Guangde known as Operation No. 19. However, on April 18, 1942, more than a dozen B-25 bombers launched an air raid in mainland Japan, with most landing at an airfield in Quzhou after the bombing run. As a result, the Imperial General Headquarters ordered the Thirteenth Army to cancel Operation No. 19 and prepare for an offensive in Zhejiang to destroy airfields potentially used for further bombing raids in Japan, which would be known as the Zhejiang-Jiangxi Campaign.

In the same year that the 3rd Regiment was nearly annihilated in the month-long operation, the 1st and 2nd Regiments were also under repeated sweeps from Japanese and Collaborationist units as well as engaging in battles with Communist troops. By the winter of 1942, the 1st Regiment had been defeated and the remnants, less than a battalion strong, fled into friendly territory. The 2nd Regiment also suffered heavy casualties and retreated into the mountains for rest and reorganization. By the end of the year, the losses of the three regiments had reached over two-thirds, and eighty to ninety percent of the nearly 40,000-strong organizations the Loyal and Patriotic Army had developed over the years had been broken up.

In the summer of 1942, Ruan Qingyuan was appointed as the acting commander of the Loyal and Patriotic Army. He continued the plan of expanding the guerrilla army into nine regiments in three columns that his predecessor Zhou Weilong hadn't been able to fully implement in time (only the 4th, 5th, and 6th Regiments had been formed before his transfer). The initial 1st Regiment, which had the strength of only one battalion, 2nd Regiment, with the strength of no more than two battalions, and the approximately 500-strong 3rd Regiment made up the 1st Column while the 2nd and 3rd Columns were formed with conscripts from Hunan and Zhejiang. Of the newly-formed units, the 5th Regiment had only two battalions as one had defected to the Japanese in the summer of 1942. Due to internal strife with former commander Zhou Weilong, Dai Li was forced to replace Ruan Qingyuan with Ma Zhichao in July 1943.

=== Reorganization ===
In April 1943, the Loyal and Patriotic Army began to be outfitted with U.S weapons. From June 1943 to April 1945, the Sino-American Cooperative Organization trained as many as 8,000 recruits of the Loyal and Patriotic Army in four phases. The first and second training phases were relatively short and focused on frontline command in combat. The third phase trained the Loyal and Patriotic Army extensively in academic and technical skills and the fourth phase was taught by U.S instructors in the art of modern warfare, which had a significant effect on the unit's combat capability.

From October to November 1943, the Japanese Thirteenth Army launched a sweeping operation across west Zhejiang, south Jiangsu, and south Anhui where some units of the Third War Zone operated in. Three columns of the Loyal and Patriotic Army were engaged in fierce fighting during this period and suffered heavy casualties, with 599 killed, 91 wounded, and 179 missing (including over 40 confirmed captured) in battles with Japanese, Collaborationist, and Communist troops. The unit also lost 373 rifles, 12 light machine guns, 6 mortars, and 9 pistols. In April 1944, a part of the Thirteenth Army swept the Nanling area of the Jiangsu-Anhui Border Region of the Third War Zone. In the battle of Nanling, the 1st Column of the Loyal and Patriotic Army suffered 35 killed, 53 wounded, and 68 missing out of a total of 1,510 troops and lost 11 rifles, 2 light machine guns, 1 flare gun, and 3 grenade launchers.

In February 1945, the 2nd Column of the Loyal and Patriotic Army alongside the 62nd Division of the 28th Army of the Third War Zone engaged in fierce combat for more than twenty days against the New Fourth Army, with the guerrilla unit suffering more than 200 casualties while claiming to have captured over 200 Communist troops and another thousand corpses buried by the Communist Army. (Note: The National Revolutionary Army claimed to have killed or wounded over 3,000 Communist troops in this first battle in February) By May, the National Revolutionary Army claimed to have driven the Communists from the Tianmu Mountain with the Loyal and Patriotic Army claiming to have stormed into the Communist command post and killing over 200 troops. The Loyal and Patriotic Army also claimed that the Communist Army had employed human wave tactics for this battle.

Based on the report of E Yousan, at 10 p.m. on May 11, 1945, the fourth training class of the Sino-American Cooperative Organization and the special forces army under its command launched a night raid at Salaqi County with over 250 troops, claiming to have initially killed six Japanese lookout before engaging in combat with reinforcements and safely withdrawing from the battlefield at 3 a.m. on May 12. SACO claimed to have killed or wounded over 20 Japanese troops and over 60 Collaborationist police while suffering 27 killed and 6 wounded. According to the detailed battle report of the Japanese 21st Independent Garrison Infantry Battalion, E Yousan's 'bandit' troops had launched raids on Salaqi County for several days. At 1 a.m. on May 12, a total of approximately 250 Chinese troops under the command of E Yousan (including special forces troops) made their way to the county from the southeast, attacking a patrol team of 3 Japanese troops and killing Private Sato after an hour of combat but were blocked at the eastern gate by another small team of Japanese troops and retreated under Japanese rifle fire and grenades from the walls at 3.30 a.m. In total, 23 troops from the 1st Platoon of the Japanese battalion took part in the battle, with one soldier killed and zero wounded or missing while claiming two abandoned enemy corpses and many enemy soldiers wounded.

== Casualties of the Loyal and Patriotic Army ==
On February 15, 1944, Ma Zhichao, then the commander of the Loyal and Patriotic Army, reported that since the establishment of the army in the battle of Shanghai seven years ago, the Loyal and Patriotic Army had fought in 246 battles against Japanese, Collaborationist, and Communist troops and had suffered 4,803 casualties. However, according to Dai Li's historical documents, the unit had suffered over 3,400 casualties by February 1940 in more than two years of guerrilla actions along the Nanjing-Shanghai-Hangzhou highway against Japanese troops and assassinations of traitors. In the Jiangnan operation of October 1940, the Loyal and Patriotic Army suffered 13 killed, 24 wounded, and 28 missing out of 6,613 troops. In 1941, the unit fought in 153 battles and suffered 548 killed, wounded, or missing. In 1943, the unit fought in 97 battles against Japanese, Collaborationist, and Communist troops and suffered 1,100 casualties. The yearly reported losses excluding 1942 had already exceeded the losses reported by Ma Zhichao.
