= 11th Division (Imperial Japanese Army) =

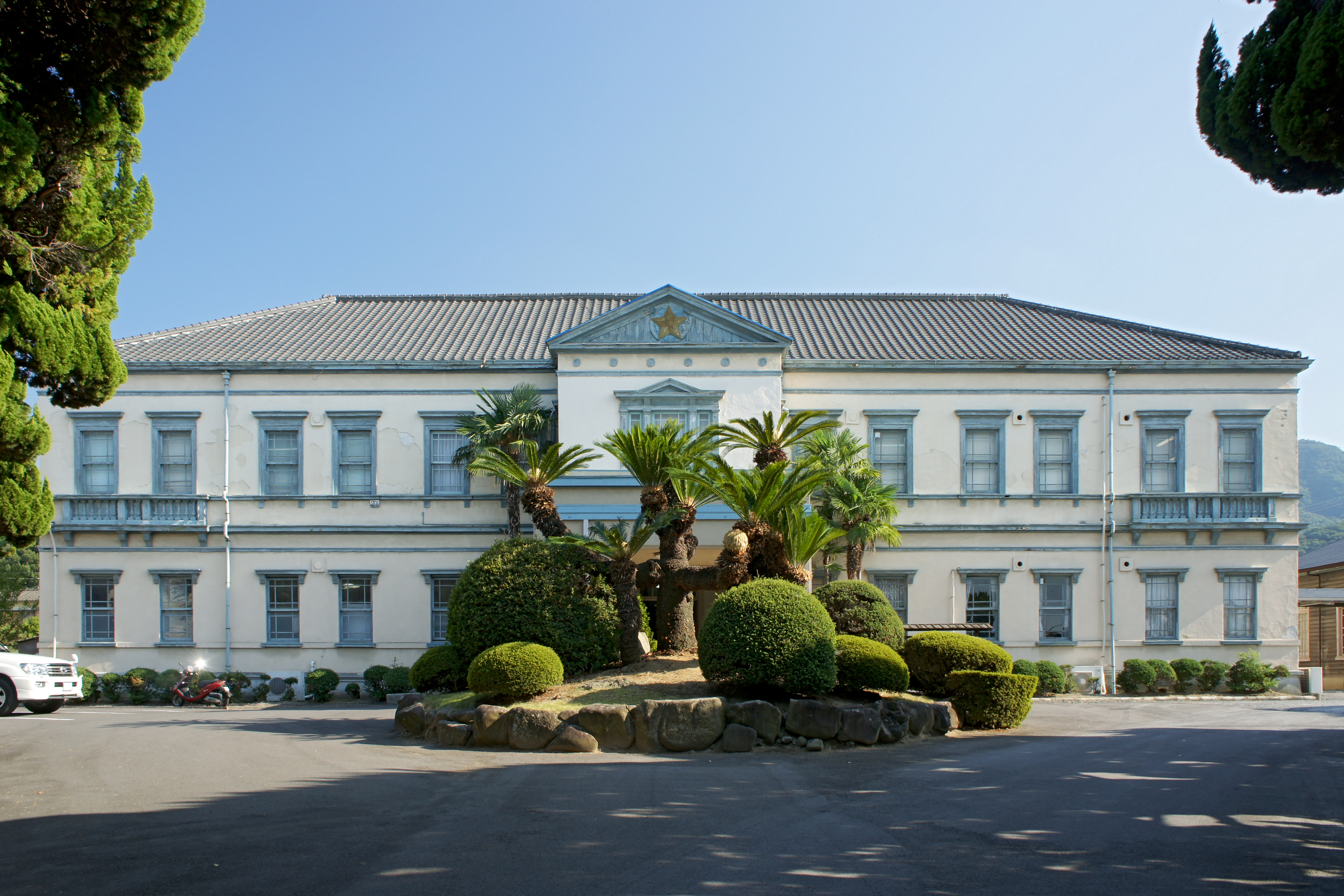
- former IJA 11th Division HQ at Zentsuji, Kagawa
- Active: 1 October 1898 – 1945
- Country: Empire of Japan
- Branch: Imperial Japanese Army
- Type: Infantry
- Size: 25,000 men
- Garrison/HQ: Zentsuji, Japan
- Nickname: Brocade Division
- Engagements: Russo-Japanese War; Second Sino-Japanese War; World War II

Commanders
- Notable commanders: Tsuchiya Mitsuharu; Yoshinori Shirakawa; Iwane Matsui; Kanichiro Tashiro; Hayao Tada; Mitsuru Ushijima

The 11th Division (第11師団, Dai Jūichi Shidan) was an infantry division in the Imperial Japanese Army. Its tsūshōgō code name was the Brocade Division (錦兵団, Nishiki-heidan), and its military symbol was 11D. The 11th Division was one of six infantry divisions newly raised by the Imperial Japanese Army after the First Sino-Japanese War (1894–1895). The division received its colors on 1 October 1898 and was disbanded in September 1945. Its troops were recruited primarily from communities in the four prefectures of the island of Shikoku. It was originally headquartered in the city of Zentsuji, Kagawa, and its first commander was Lieutenant General Nogi Maresuke.

== Action ==
=== Russo-Japanese War to Siberian Intervention ===
During the Russo-Japanese War, under the command of Lieutenant General Tsuchiya Mitsuharu, this division was assigned to General Nogi's 3rd Army, and thus saw considerable combat (and casualties) at the bloody Siege of Port Arthur. It subsequently formed the core of General Kawamura Kageaki's 5th Army, where (under the command of Lieutenant General Samejima Shigeo, it played a significant role in securing the Japanese victory at the Battle of Mukden. The division remained stationed in Manchuria as a garrison force for two years after the end of the Russo-Japanese War, and only returned to Zentsuji 7 May 1911.

The 11th Division was deployed again to the continent during the Japanese intervention in Siberia in August 1920, replacing the IJA 14th Division. The division has demobilized and returned to Japan in June 1921.

=== Second Sino-Japanese War and Pacific War ===
The 11th Division was one of the three Japanese divisions deployed to Shanghai in China during the January 28 Incident in 1932. It returned to Shanghai in July 1937 with the start of the Second Sino-Japanese War, but was reassigned to garrison duty in Manchukuo from September 1938. In October 1939, the division was reorganized into a triangular division, with its IJA 22nd Infantry Regiment forming the core of the new 24th Division.

After the start of the Pacific War, the division was based at Mishan, near Lake Khasan in eastern Manchukuo as part of the 5th Army, in support of anti-partisan police actions and to act as a deterrent against Soviet border forces. At the time it was commanded by Lieutenant General Mitsuru Ushijima.

In February 1944, a large part of division (3rd battalions of 12th infantry, 43rd infantry and 11th mountain artillery regiments) of the 11th Division's strength were detached to 10th Independent Mixed Regiment (tsūshōgō code 17584) and sent to Guam to reinforce the 1st division, which was annihilated at the Battle of Guam (1944) in July–August 1944.

In April 1945, the remainder of the 11th Division was transferred from Manchukuo back to Shikoku under command of the 55th army in preparation for the expected Allied invasion of Japan. It and disbanded with the surrender of Japan in August 1945.

== See also ==
- List of Japanese Infantry Divisions
