= 23rd Division (Imperial Japanese Army) =

- Active: 1938–1945
- Country: Empire of Japan
- Branch: Imperial Japanese Army
- Type: Infantry
- Garrison/HQ: Kumamoto, Japan
- Nickname: Sunrise Division
- Engagements: Battle of Khalkhin Gol (Battle of Nomonhan); Pacific War

Commanders
- Notable commanders: Michitarō Komatsubara, Kōtoku Satō; Masakichi Inoue

The 23rd Division (第23師団, Dai-nijūsan Shidan) was an infantry division in the Imperial Japanese Army. Its call-sign was the Sunrise Division (旭兵団, Kyokuhei-dan). The 23rd Division was formed in Kumamoto on 4 April 1938, on the same day as 15th, 17th, 21st and 22nd divisions, as part of the military build-up following the outbreak of the Second Sino-Japanese War. The first divisional commander was Michitarō Komatsubara.

== Action ==
=== Battle of Khalkhin Gol ===
Upon formation, the 23rd Division was almost immediately sent to the Northern frontier of Manchukuo, where it replaced a cavalry brigade on garrison duties in Hailar (in what is now part of Inner Mongolia). The 23rd Division was thus the primary Japanese division involved in the Battle of Khalkhin Gol against the Red Army of the Soviet Union, from 11 May to September 1939. The 23rd Division had engaged Soviet forces by progressively increasing detachments, first by its reconnaissance regiment (which was promptly lost and reformed) and then by 64th Infantry Regiment, which was also defeated and forced to retreat. A counter-attack 4 July 1939 also failed, causing additional losses, including the divisional chief-of-staff. On 4 August 1939, the 23rd Division was subordinated to the 6th Army as the border conflict continued to escalate. The 23rd Division was nearly annihilated in an encirclement following a Soviet attack on 20 August 1939. Infantry regiments ceased to exist as fighting units by 29 August 1939, when all regimental commanders were killed. During the battle, the 23rd Division suffered a total of 11,958 men killed, about 80 percent of its combat strength. Notably, the only divisional sub-unit not suffering crippling casualties was the reconnaissance regiment, which was able to break out of the Soviet encirclement. General Michitaro Komatsubara was recalled to Japan in disgrace.

=== Pacific War ===
The remnants of the 23rd Division returned to Japan, and were assigned to assist the No.8 Border Defence Force (the future 119th division) in 1940. Gradually, the division was re-formed as an exemplary Mechanized infantry division. In 1944, by then back up to strength, the 23rd Division was reassigned to garrison duties in Taiwan, with most of vehicles and heavy equipment left behind for the 119th Division.

With the situation in the Philippines against the United States in the Pacific War becoming ever more precarious, the 23rd Division was reassigned to Luzon. While en route, under control of the Japanese 14th Area Army, it suffered heavy losses when Convoy HI-81 was attacked in mid-November 1944. The division arrived just in time to engage in combat against the Americans during the Invasion of Lingayen Gulf. At this battle and in subsequent combat against the combined American and Philippine Commonwealth armed forces, during the Battle of Luzon to March 1945, the 23rd Division suffered 24,508 killed in combat out of a total strength of 29,636 men. By March, the division had run out of food, which resulted in mass starvation. The 23rd Division ceased to exist after the Battle of Luzon, and survivors had retreated to Bokod by the time of the surrender of Japan 15 August 1945.

== See also ==
- List of Japanese Infantry Divisions
