= Mitsuharu =

- Gender: Male

Origin
- Origin: Japanese
- Meaning: Different meanings depending on the kanji used

Mitsuharu (written: 光晴, 光春 or 光治) is a masculine Japanese given name. Notable people with the name include:

- Akechi Mitsuharu (明智 光春; 1537–1582), Japanese samurai
- Fuwa Mitsuharu (不破 光治; died 1580), Japanese samurai and daimyō
- Tsuchiya Mitsuharu (土屋 光春; 1848–1920), Imperial Japanese Army general
- Mitsuharu Matsuyama (松山 光治; 1891–1959), Imperial Japanese Navy admiral
- Mitsuharu Kaneko (金子 光晴; 1895–1975), Japanese poet
- Mitsuharu Misawa (三沢 光晴; 1962–2009), Japanese professional wrestler
