= 70th Division (Imperial Japanese Army) =

- 第70師団
- Active: 1942 - 1945
- Country: Empire of Japan
- Branch: Imperial Japanese Army
- Type: Infantry
- Role: Internal security
- Engagements: Zhejiang-Jiangxi campaign

Commanders
- Notable commanders: Uchida Takayuki (内田孝行)

The 70th Division (第70師団, Dai-nanajū Shidan) was an infantry division in the Imperial Japanese Army. It was created on February 2, 1942 by blending a detachment from 20th Independent Mixed Brigade (Imperial Japanese Army) to 62nd infantry brigade in Ningbo, simultaneously with the 68th and 69th divisions. Being the counter-insurgency division (C-type/hei-type) it has a backbone composed of independent infantry battalions and lacked an artillery force. The men of the division were drafted through 5th military district, located in Hiroshima Prefecture. Its callsign was "Spear Division" (槍師団).

== Action ==
After completing a training, the division was assigned to the 13th army and sent to Shanghai area in April 1942 to take a part in Zhejiang-Jiangxi campaign. From May 1942, the division operated in Guangde County, Quzhou, Lishui, Wenzhou and other prefectures. A large reinforcement for the 70th division has sailed from Karatsu 25 May 1942, and arrived to Shanghai 28 May 1942. Later it taken a defensive positions in the direction of Jiaxing. It was subordinated to the Kwantung Army as part of 6th army, and ordered to go to Manchuria during the Soviet invasion of Manchuria in August 1945.

== See also ==
- List of Japanese Infantry divisions
- Independent Mixed Brigades (Imperial Japanese Army)

== Reference and further reading ==
- List of Japanese Infantry Divisions
- Madej, W. Victor. Japanese Armed Forces Order of Battle, 1937-1945 [2 vols] Allentown, PA: 1981
- 秦郁彦編『日本陸海軍総合事典』第2版、東京大学出版会、2005年。
- 外山操・森松俊夫編著『帝国陸軍編制総覧』芙蓉書房出版、1987年。
- 別冊歴史読本 戦記シリーズNo.32 太平洋戦争師団戦史』、新人物往来社、1996年。

This article incorporates material from the article 第70師団_(日本軍) in the Japanese Wikipedia, retrieved on 13 January 2015.
