= 161st Division (Imperial Japanese Army) =

- 第161師団
- Active: 1945–1945
- Country: Empire of Japan
- Allegiance: 13th army
- Branch: Imperial Japanese Army
- Type: Infantry
- Garrison/HQ: Shanghai
- Nickname: Skyquake division
- Engagements: none

The 161st Division (第161師団, Dai-hyakurokujūichi Shidan) was an infantry division of the Imperial Japanese Army. Its call sign was the Skyquake Division (震天兵団, Shinten Heidan). It was formed 12 April 1945 in Shanghai as a class C(hei) security division.

== Action ==
The 161st division was performing a coastal defense duties at Shanghai up to the start Soviet invasion of Manchuria 9 August 1945. Ordered to assist the Kwantung Army together with the 118th division, it left Shanghai by rail 13 August 1945 and reached Nanjing by the time of surrender of Japan 15 August 1945.

The divisional artillery consisted of 12 pieces, namely 75 mm field guns and Type 91 10 cm howitzers.

The division was returned to Shanghai 15 February 1946, and started demobilization 25 February 1946. The troops were sent to Japan through Kagoshima, Fukuoka, Nagato and Sasebo, Nagasaki ports, finishing dissolution 6 September 1946.

== See also ==
- List of Japanese Infantry Divisions

== Notes and references ==
- This article incorporates material from Japanese Wikipedia page 第161師団 (日本軍), accessed 14 July 2016
- Madej, W. Victor, Japanese Armed Forces Order of Battle, 1937–1945 [2 vols], Allentown, PA: 1981.
