= Sadamu Shimomura =

Japanese politician (1887–1968)

- 下村 定
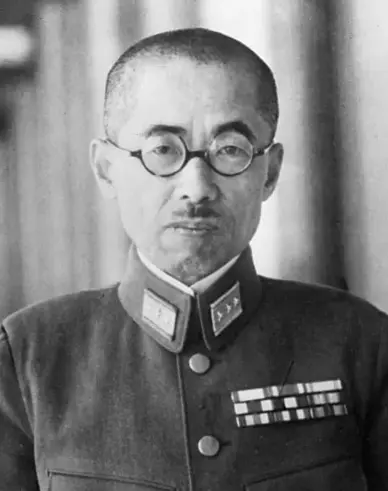
- Shimomura in 1945

Minister of the Army
- In office 23 August 1945 – 1 December 1945
- Prime Minister: Kijūrō Shidehara
- Preceded by: Prince Naruhiko Higashikuni
- Succeeded by: Office abolished

Inspector-General of Military Training
- In office 25 August 1945 – 15 October 1945
- Monarch: Hirohito
- Preceded by: Kenji Doihara
- Succeeded by: Position abolished

Member of the House of Councillors
- In office 2 June 1959 – 1 June 1965
- Constituency: National district

Personal details
- Born: 23 September 1887 Kōchi Prefecture, Japan
- Died: 25 March 1968 (aged 80) Bunkyō, Tokyo, Japan
- Party: Liberal Democratic
- Other political affiliations: Independent (1945)
- Education: Army War College

Military service
- Allegiance: Empire of Japan
- Branch/service: Imperial Japanese Army
- Years of service: 1908–1945
- Rank: General
- Commands: Thirteenth Army; Northern China Area Army
- Battles/wars: Second Sino-Japanese War; World War II

Sadamu Shimomura (下村 定, Shimomura Sadamu; 23 September 1887 – 25 March 1968) was a general in the Imperial Japanese Army and the final Minister of War of the Empire of Japan.

== Early life and education ==
Shimomura was born in Kōchi Prefecture, but was raised in Kanazawa, Ishikawa, where his father was a recruiting officer for the Imperial Japanese Army. After attended military preparatory schools in Kanazawa and Nagoya, he graduated 6th out of 273 cadets from the 20th class of the Imperial Japanese Army Academy in 1908. His classmates included Prince Asaka, Prince Higashikuni Naruhiko, Prince Kitashirakawa Naruhisa, Mitsuru Ushijima, Heitarō Kimura, Takashi Sakai, and Shōjirō Iida. His speciality was artillery. He subsequently graduated at the head of his class from the 28th class of the Army Staff College in 1916.

== Career ==
After serving in a number of staff and administrative positions within the Imperial Japanese Army General Staff, Shimomura was posted to France as a military attaché in 1919. He returned to the Strategy and Planning bureau of the General Staff in 1921 and was promoted to major in 1922. He was assigned as the Army observer to the Japanese delegation at the Geneva Naval Conference negotiations from 1928 to 1929, during which time he was promoted to lieutenant colonel. He returned to Geneva in April 1931 as part of the Japanese delegation to the League of Nations and was promoted to colonel in August. The Geneva Conference on Disarmament occurred in December. From December 1933 Shimomura was commander of the IJA 1st Heavy Field Artillery Regiment.

=== World War II ===
In March 1935, Shimomura was assigned to the staff of the Kwantung Army, returning to Japan in December to serve as an instructor at the Army Staff College. He was promoted to major general in March 1936. He returned to the General Staff as Chief of the 4th Bureau from August 1936, and of the 1st Bureau from September 1937. The 1st Bureau was in charge of operational planning, and Shimomura was strong proponent of a more aggressive approach towards the Kuomintang government in the Shanghai area and his recommendations influenced the decision of the Japanese General Staff to authorize the landings of the Japanese Tenth Army at the start of the Battle of Shanghai. he was assigned command of Tokyo Bay Fortress in September 1938.

Shimomura was promoted to lieutenant general in March 1939. He was appointed commandant of the Artillery School in August 1940, and of the Army Staff College in September 1941. He was given a field command in October 1942 in the form of the Japanese Thirteenth Army, a garrison force based in Shanghai and surrounding provinces primarily to deter the possible landings of the Allies of World War II in the lower Yangtze River area of east central China.

In March 1944, Shimomura was withdrawn to the Japanese home islands and became commander of the Western District Army, another force intended to defend against Allied landings. However, in November 1944, he was sent back to China as commander of the North China Area Army.

In May 1945, Shimomura was promoted to full general, and on 23 August (just after the surrender of Japan), was appointed final Army Minister under the Shidehara cabinet. One of the reasons for his selection was that he had never been involved in hostilities against the United States at any point in his military career. Shimomura was also concurrently the final Inspector-General for Military Training. His primary task was to oversee the demobilization of the Imperial Japanese Army.

As with all other members of the former Japanese government, Shimomura was briefly taken into custody by the American occupation authorities from 1946 to 1947, but was released without charges filed.

== Political career ==
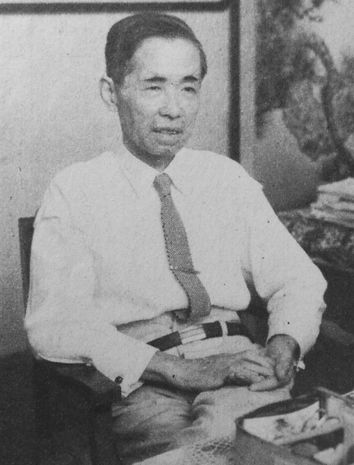
Shimomura in 1955

In 1955, Shimomura was asked to help create the post-war Japan Defense Agency. In June 1959, he was elected to the House of Councilors in the post-war Diet of Japan for a single term with the support of the Liberal-Democratic Party. He ran again in the 1965 Japanese House of Councillors election, but was defeated. Shimomura died in a traffic accident on 25 March 1968.

== Decorations ==
- 1940 – Order of the Golden Kite, 3rd class
- 1940 – Order of the Sacred Treasure, 2nd class
- 1944 – Grand Cordon of the Order of the Sacred Treasure
- 1958 – Grand Cordon of the Order of the Rising Sun

Political offices
Preceded by Prince Higashikuni Naruhiko	Army Minister; Aug 1945 – Dec 1945	Succeeded by none
Military offices
Preceded by Kenji Doihara	Inspector-General of Military Training; Aug 1945 – Oct 1945	Succeeded by none
Preceded by Naozaburo Okabe	Commander of North China Area Army; Nov 1944 – Aug 1945	Succeeded by none
Preceded by Keisuke Fujie	Commander of Western District Army; Mar 1944 – Nov 1944	Succeeded by Isamu Yokoyama
Preceded by Shigeru Sawada	Commander of IJA 13th Army; Oct 1942 – Mar 1944	Succeeded by Sajishige Nagatsu
Preceded by Masatake Yamawaki	Commandant of Army War College; 1941–1942	Succeeded by Naozaburo Okabe
Preceded by Masao Yokoyama	Commander, Tokyo Bay Fortress; 1938–1940	Succeeded by Kōichi Kobayashi
