= 68th Division (Imperial Japanese Army) =

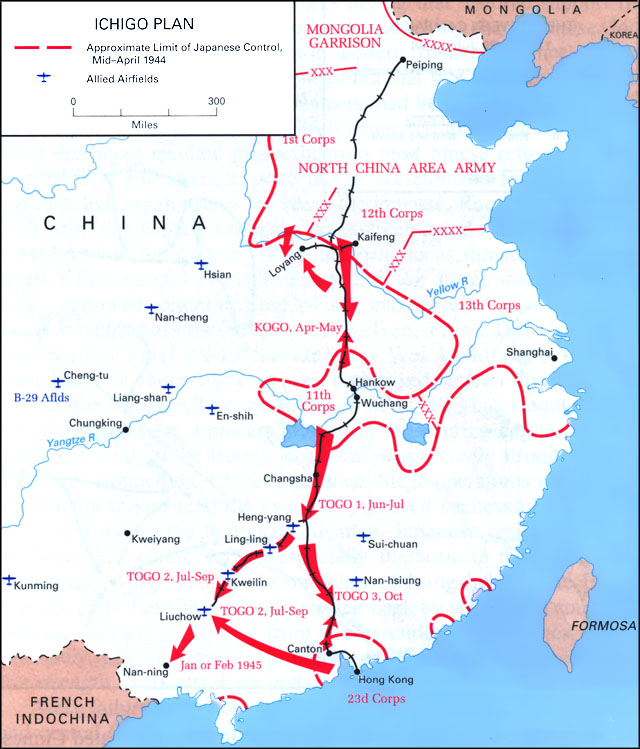
- A map of the Japanese Plan for Operation Ichi-Go
- Active: 1942 - 1945
- Country: Empire of Japan
- Branch: Imperial Japanese Army
- Type: Infantry
- Nickname: Cypress Division
- Engagements: Battle of West Hubei; Battle of Changde; Operation Ichi-Go; Defense of Hengyang; Battle of West Hunan

The 68th Division (第68師団, Dai-rokujūhachi Shidan) was an infantry division of the Imperial Japanese Army. Its call sign was the Cypress Division (檜兵団, Hinoki Heidan). It was formed on 2 February 1942 in Jiujiang city as a class C (security) division, simultaneously with the 69th and 70th divisions. The backbone of security division has consisted of the eight independent infantry battalions, and it does not have an artillery regiment. The nucleus for the formation was the 14th Independent mixed brigade.

== Action ==
The 68th division has started a garrison duty from April 1942, covering an area of the former 14th Independent mixed brigade. The 68th division took part in the Battle of West Hubei in April 1943. At the end of 1943, it participated in Battle of Changde, operating in Hanshou County.

In May 1944, the 68th division was assigned to 11th army and has participated in Operation Ichi-Go, particularly on the southern flank of the defense of Hengyang.

After the end of the offensive, the 68th division was assigned to 20th army and participated in the Battle of West Hunan from April 1945.

== See also ==
- List of Japanese Infantry Divisions
- Independent Mixed Brigades (Imperial Japanese Army)

== Notes ==
- This article incorporates material from Japanese Wikipedia page 第68師団 (日本軍), accessed 19 June 2016
