= 22nd Division (Imperial Japanese Army) =

- Active: 1938 - 1945
- Country: Empire of Japan
- Branch: Imperial Japanese Army
- Type: Infantry
- Nickname: Plains Division
- Engagements: Second Sino-Japanese War

The 22nd Division (第22師団, Dai-nijūni Shidan) was an infantry division in the Imperial Japanese Army. Its call sign was the Plains Division (原兵団, Hara Heidan). The 22nd Division was raised in 1938 out of the reserve components of the 14th Division, on the same day as the 15th, 17th, 21st and 23rd divisions, as part of the military buildup following the outbreak of the Second Sino-Japanese War.

== Action ==
After minimal training, it was assigned to the Japanese Central China Area Army and participated at the Battle of Wuhan. Assigned to the Japanese 13th Army, its primary duty was initially to be a garrison force for the Hangzhou area. However, as the war against China continued to heat up, the 22nd Division was called upon in the Third War Area in the 1939-40 Winter Offensive campaign. In 1942, it fought in Quzhou, Guangfeng District and other places. By 1943, the 22nd division was garrisoning Jinhua. On 24 November 1943, the divisional infantry brigade was abolished, and infantry regiments were directly subordinated to the divisional command. By February 1944 the 22nd Division came under the command of the Japanese 23rd Army, and was in Guangdong province, opposite Hong Kong. An effort to cross over into Hong Kong was thwarted by the US Navy, which resulted in the loss of most of the 86th Infantry Regiment when their transports were sunk. Unable to reach Hong Kong, the 22nd Division turned south, and fought its way through Guangxi province (and participating in the Battle of Guilin-Liuzhou (a part of a general Japanese offensive during Operation Ichi-Go), until it linked with the Japanese-occupied French Indochina. In 1945, the headquarters of the 22nd Division was in Bangkok, Thailand, and it contributed forces to the defense of Burma against the British (Operation Dracula). The 22nd Division was dissolved in Bangkok with the dissolution of the Imperial Japanese Army at the end of World War II; however, a number of its troops refused to return to Japan and defected to join the Viet Minh in their struggle for independence (First Indochina War) against the returning French colonial forces.

The division recorded its first battle near Fuyang from September 22 to September 27, 1938 against the Chinese Third War Zone where it lost 50 troops killed and 50 troops died of wounds or illnesses. From January 1940 to September 1942, the 22nd Division participated in multiple major operations and mopping-up campaigns including the 1939-1940 Winter Offensive, the Jiangnan Operation, the East Zhejiang Operation, and the Zhejiang-Jiangxi Campaign, during which 672 troops of the division were killed and another 1,130 died of wounds or illnesses. In February 1942, a portion of the division also took part in the sweeping operation against elements of the Nationalist Loyal and Patriotic Army. After it was subordinated to the 23rd Army in February 1944, the division fought in the Hunan-Guangxi Operation and lost 159 troops killed and 262 troops died of wounds or illnesses. On July 4, 1944, while the 86th Infantry Regiment was being transported to Hong Kong, many of the ships they were on were sunk by U.S submarines near Dongsha Island resulting in the loss of 505 troops killed and approximately 60 wounded. The remaining transports reached Hong Kong on July 5.

== See also ==
- List of Japanese Infantry Divisions

== Reference and further reading ==
- Madej, W. Victor. Japanese Armed Forces Order of Battle, 1937-1945 [2 vols] Allentown, PA: 1981
- This article incorporates material from the Japanese Wikipedia page 第22師団 (日本軍), accessed 7 March 2016
