= 61st Division (Imperial Japanese Army) =

- Active: 1943 - 1945
- Country: Empire of Japan
- Branch: Imperial Japanese Army
- Type: Infantry
- Garrison/HQ: Tokyo
- Nickname: Jump Division
- Engagements: Second Sino-Japanese War

The 61st Division (第61師団, Dai-rokujūichi Shidan) was an infantry division of the Imperial Japanese Army. Its call sign was the Jump Division (鵄兵団, Tobi Heidan). It was formed on 13 March 1943 at Tokyo as a triangular division. The nucleus for the formation was the 61st independent infantry brigade. Because the 61st Division was intended for garrison duty, it initially did not include an artillery regiment. The division was permanently assigned to the 13th army.

== Action ==
The 61st division was transferred to the Nanjing area to replace the 15th division departing for Burma in June 1943. It performed garrison duties uneventfully until February 1945, when it formed a mortar company and was transferred to Shanghai. In the Shanghai area it continued preparations for the anticipated Allied landing until the surrender of Japan on 15 August 1945.

== See also ==
- List of Japanese Infantry Divisions

== Notes ==
- This article incorporates material from Japanese Wikipedia page 第61師団 (日本軍), accessed 13 June 2016

== Reference and further reading ==
- Madej, W. Victor. Japanese Armed Forces Order of Battle, 1937-1945 [2 vols]

Allentown, PA: 1981
