= Masakichi Inoue =

Imperial Japanese Army lieutenant general (1886–1975)

- 井上 政吉
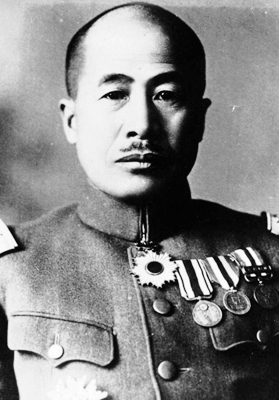
- Born: January 18, 1894
- Died: April 7, 1975 (aged 81)
- Resting place: Tama Cemetery
- Education: Imperial Japanese Army Academy
- Military career
- Allegiance: Empire of Japan
- Branch: Imperial Japanese Army
- Service years: 1905–1941; 1945
- Rank: Lieutenant general
- Units: IJA 5th Division; Kwantung Army
- Commands: IJA 23rd Division
- Conflicts: Second Sino-Japanese War; World War II; Pacific War

Masakichi Inoue (井上 政吉, Inoue Masakichi; January 18, 1886 – April 7, 1975) was a lieutenant general in the Imperial Japanese Army during World War II.

== Biography ==
A native of Kyoto Prefecture, Inoue graduated from the 18th class of the Imperial Japanese Army Academy in 1905.

From 1933 to 1935, Inoue was commander of the Tsu Regimental District. He was transferred to the 6th Infantry Regiment in 1935, and became commander of the 3rd Imperial Guards Regiment in 1936.

With the start of the Second Sino-Japanese War, Inoue was reassigned to the IJA 5th Division, but was in charge of the Sendai Army Youth School and the 36th Infantry Brigade until 1938. Transferred to the Kwantung Leased Territory, he was assigned to staff positions within the Kwantung Army Headquarters in 1939. However, on 6 November 1939, he was promoted to commander in chief of the IJA 23rd Division, helping rebuild the division after the disastrous Battle of Nomonhan and holding that post until 1 March 1941.

In 1941, Inoue formally retired from active military service. He was recalled to duty in 1945, serving as Commandant of the Toyama Army Infantry School until the end of the war. He died in 1975, and his grave is at the Tama Cemetery in Fuchu, Tokyo.
