= Sadae Inoue =

Japanese officer, war criminal 1886-1961

- 井上 貞衛
- Born: November 5, 1886; Kumamoto, Japan
- Died: October 26, 1961 (aged 74); Japan
- Military career
- Allegiance: Empire of Japan
- Branch: Imperial Japanese Army
- Service years: 1908–1945
- Rank: Lieutenant General
- Commands: 33rd, 69th, 14th divisions
- Conflicts: Siberian Intervention; Second Sino-Japanese War; World War II

Sadae Inoue (井上 貞衛, Inoue Sadae; November 5, 1886 – October 26, 1961) was a general in the Imperial Japanese Army in World War II. He commanded the Japanese forces at the Battle of Peleliu and the Battle of Angaur.

== Early life and education ==
Inoue was born in Kumamoto prefecture as the third son of a local police officer; however, he listed his official residence as Kōchi Prefecture. He attended military preparatory schools and was a graduate of the 20th class of the Imperial Japanese Army Academy in 1908.

== Career ==
He was assigned to the IJA's 44th Infantry Regiment, and served during Japan's Siberian Intervention against Bolshevik forces in eastern Russia. With the start of the Second Sino-Japanese War, Inoue was commander of the IJA's 5th Infantry Regiment.

After having risen steadily through the ranks, Inoue was commissioned as a major general in March 1939 and became commander of the IJA 33rd Division. In 1941, he was attached to the headquarters staff of the Taiwan Army of Japan. Inoue was promoted to lieutenant general in 1942, and from 1942 to 1943, was commanding general of the 69th division, stationed in Shanxi province, China.

He assumed command of the 14th division in 1943, which was based in Manchukuo. However, as the war situation in the Pacific War continued to deteriorate against the Japanese, the 14th Division was reassigned to the Southern Expeditionary Army Group, and was personally tasked with the defense of Palau by General Hideki Tōjō. Both Inoue and Tōjō knew that the 14th division would not be able to hold the island group against the numerically superior Allied forces, but the Japanese government felt that it was critical to defend the islands to the death, which would result in a Pyrrhic victory for the Allies and would serve to discourage further invasions of the Japanese South Seas Mandate.

Two major battles were fought in Palau under Inoue's command: the Battle of Angaur and the Battle of Peleliu. Both were among the costliest of the war in terms of number of casualties on both sides, as Inoue deviated from previous Japanese tactics, eschewing banzai charges and making the best use of terrain and artificial fortifications in an attempt to create a war of attrition.

== Later life and death ==
After the war, Inoue was arrested by the American occupation authorities and deported to Guam, where he was tried for Class B and Class C war crimes and condemned to death in 1949 for negligence of command responsibility in permitting subordinates to execute three downed American airmen captured in Palau. His sentence was commuted to life imprisonment in 1951, and he was released in 1953. Inoue died in Japan in 1961.

== See also ==
- 14th Infantry Division
