= 119th Division (Imperial Japanese Army) =

- 第119師団
- Active: 1944–1945
- Country: Empire of Japan
- Allegiance: Fourth Army
- Branch: Imperial Japanese Army
- Type: Infantry
- Garrison/HQ: Hailar
- Nickname: Slaughter division
- Engagements: Soviet invasion of Manchuria

The 119th Division (第119師団, Dai-hyakujūkyū Shidan) was an infantry division of the Imperial Japanese Army. Its call sign was the Slaughter Division (宰兵団, Sai Heidan). It was formed 10 November 1944 in Heilongjiang as a triangular division. The nucleus for the formation was the leftovers of 23rd Division and the 8th Borders Guards Garrison. The division was initially assigned to the Sixth Army.

== Action ==
Initially the 119th Division was garrisoning Hailar, but on 25 January 1945 was reassigned to Fourth Army without changing location.

During Soviet invasion of Manchuria the 119th division surrendered on 16 August 1945 and was disarmed by 3 September 1945. The last soldiers taken prisoner by the Red Army were returned to Japan in 1968.

== See also ==
- List of Japanese Infantry Divisions

== Notes and references ==
- This article incorporates material from Japanese Wikipedia page 第119師団 (日本軍), accessed 28 June 2016
- Madej, W. Victor, Japanese Armed Forces Order of Battle, 1937–1945 [2 vols], Allentown, PA: 1981.
