= Samejima Shigeo =

Japanese general (1849–1928)

Baron Samejima Shigeo
- 鮫島 重雄
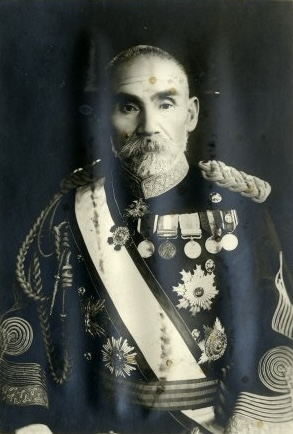
- Born: October 21, 1849; Satsuma Province, Japan
- Died: July 21, 1928 (aged 78); Tokyo, Japan
- Military career
- Allegiance: Empire of Japan
- Branch: Imperial Japanese Army
- Service years: 1871–1916
- Rank: General
- Commands: 11th Division; 14th Division
- Conflicts: Taiwan Expedition; Satsuma Rebellion; First Sino-Japanese War; Russo-Japanese War

Baron Samejima Shigeo (鮫島 重雄, Shigeo Samejima; 21 October 1849 – 17 April 1928) was a general of the Imperial Japanese Army during the Russo-Japanese War.

== Biography ==
A native of Kagoshima prefecture, Samejima was the younger son of a samurai of Satsuma Domain. He joined the fledgling Imperial Japanese Army in 1871, and rose up from the ranks, starting with corporal in June 1873. He attended the Imperial Japanese Army Academy in March 1874 and was commissioned as an ensign with the Tokyo Garrison. He was a participant of the Japanese invasion of Taiwan (1874) and promoted to second lieutenant. He fought against his fellow Satsuma clansmen in the suppression of the Satsuma Rebellion in 1877 and was promoted to lieutenant in military engineering in the IJA 1st Infantry Brigade. In March 1879, he was assigned to the Imperial Japanese Army General Staff and promoted to captain in April 1881. He subsequently served in numerous staff positions, including on the Imperial Guard and as vice-commandant of the Army Staff College. He served in combat during the First Sino-Japanese War of 1894-1895 and was promoted to major general in September 1897.

From April 1900, Samejima was commander of Yura Fortress and from May 1902 was commander of Tokyo Bay Fortress, becoming a lieutenant general in September 1904. In December 1904, he was appointed commander of the newly created IJA 11th Infantry Division and was sent to the front lines as reinforcement to General Nogi Maresuke's Japanese Third Army at the Siege of Port Arthur in the Russo-Japanese War. The 11th Division subsequently became the core of the new Japanese Fifth Army at the Battle of Mukden. In April 1906, he was awarded the Grand Cordon of the Order of the Rising Sun and in June 1906 was transferred to command the IJA 14th Division.

In September 1907, Samejima was elevated to the kazoku peerage with the title of baron (danshaku). In September 1911, he was promoted to full general, and entered the reserves the same year. He officially retired in April 1916. Samejima had no children, and his title became extinct on his death in 1928.

== Decorations ==
- 1895 – Order of the Sacred Treasure, 3rd class
- 1895 – Order of the Golden Kite, 4th class
- 1904 – Order of the Sacred Treasure, 2nd class
- 1906 – Order of the Golden Kite, 2nd class
- 1906 – Grand Cordon of the Order of the Rising Sun
