= Michitarō Komatsubara =

Imperial Japanese Army lieutenant general (1885–1940)

- 小松原 道太郎
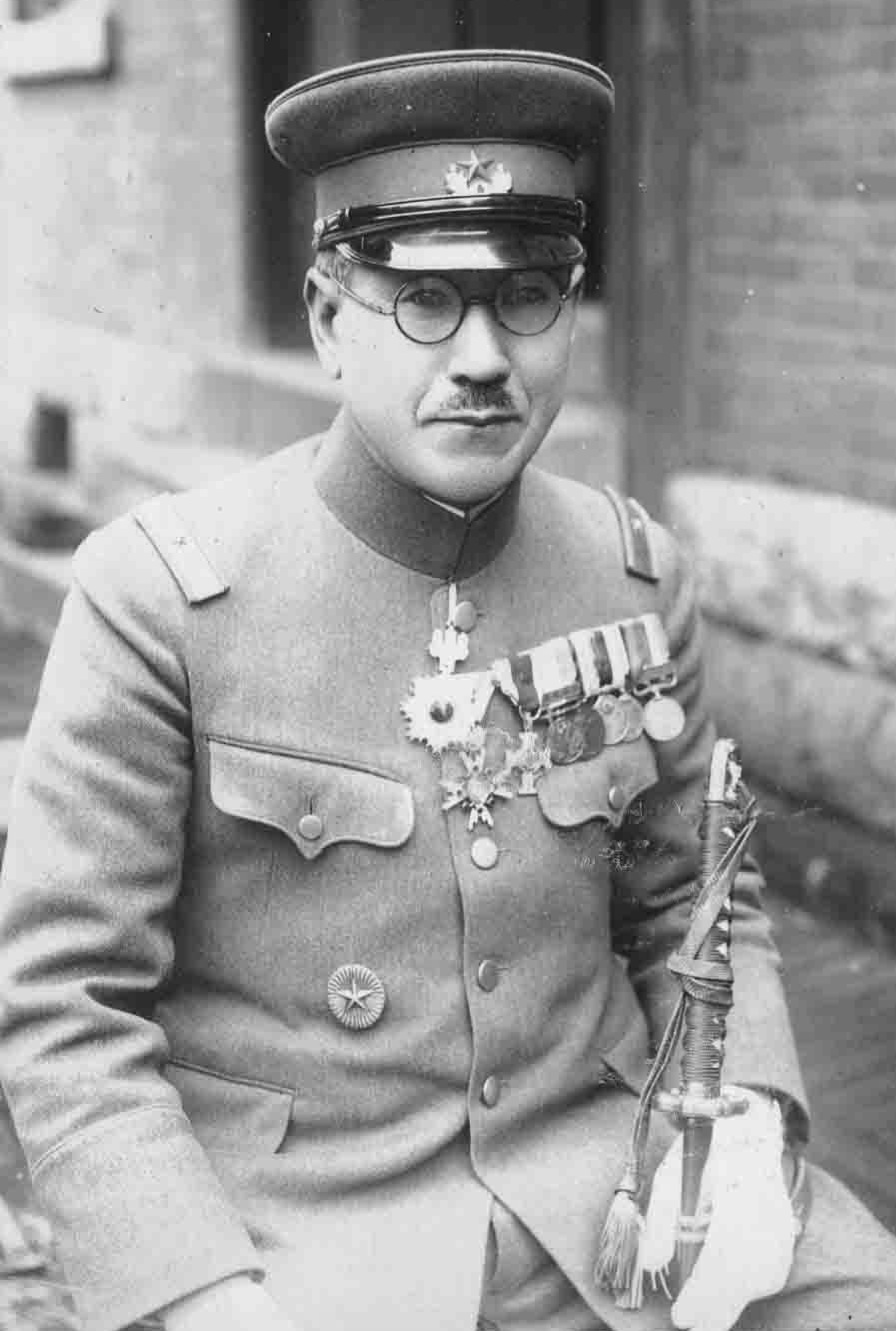
- Komatsubara in 1936–37 as commander of the 1st Imperial Guards Brigade
- Born: 20 July 1885; Yokohama, Kanagawa, Japan
- Died: 6 October 1940 (aged 55); Tokyo, Japan
- Military career
- Allegiance: Empire of Japan
- Branch: Imperial Japanese Army
- Service years: 1905–1940
- Rank: Lieutenant General
- Commands: IJA 23rd Division
- Conflicts: World War I; Battle of Khalkhin Gol/Nomonhan incident

Michitarō Komatsubara (小松原 道太郎, Komatsubara Michitarō; 20 July 1885 – 6 October 1940) was a general in the Imperial Japanese Army during the Nomonhan Incident.

== Biography ==
A native of Yokohama in Kanagawa Prefecture, where his father was a naval engineer, Komatsubara graduated from the 18th class of the Imperial Japanese Army Academy in 1905. He served as a military attaché to Russia from 1909–1910, and became fluent in Russian. After his return to Japan, he was assigned to a number of staff positions within the Imperial Japanese Army General Staff and Supreme War Council (Japan). In 1914, he was part of the World War I Japanese Expeditionary Force at the Battle of Tsingtao.

On Komatsubara's return to Japan in 1915, he graduated from the 27th class of the Army Staff College and was assigned as commander of the IJA 34th Infantry Regiment.

From 1919, Komatsubara was assigned to the Soviet Branch of the 4th Section (European & American Military Intelligence), 2nd Bureau, of the Army General Staff. After spending 1926–1927 as an instructor at the War College, he returned to Moscow again as a military attache from 1927–1929.

After Komatsubara returned again to Japan, he became commander of the IJA 57th Infantry Regiment from 1930–1932. Two years later, he became Chief of the Harbin Special Agency in Manchukuo. He was promoted to major general in 1934 and returned to Japan to take command of the IJA 8th Infantry Brigade. Subsequently, from 1936–1937, he was commander of the 1st Imperial Guards Brigade.

Promoted to lieutenant general in 1937, he was reassigned to Manchukuo as commander of the IJA 23rd Division, which was essentially encircled and destroyed by Zhukov's forces in the Battles of Khalkhin Gol (Nomonhan). He also served on the staff of the Kwantung Army. He retired from the army on 31 January 1940, after more than 35 years of military service. While in retirement he joined the National Policy Research Association where he helped share his knowledge and experience of Russians and the Battles of Khalkhin Gol. Later he was admitted to the Tokyo University hospital, and diagnosed with stomach cancer. Komatsubara died on 6 October 1940 at age 55, less than eight months after retiring from the army.
