= Reconnaissance regiments (Japan) =

Type of unit in the Imperial Japanese Army

The Reconnaissance regiment (搜索聯隊 or 搜索隊, Sōsaku-rentai or Sōsaku-tai) was a type of military establishment within the Imperial Japanese Army during the 1940-1945 period. Derived from the Cavalry regiment, the reconnaissance regiment was tasked with combat scouting. In Japanese military literature, the term "reconnaissance regiment" is commonly abbreviated as SO. These regiments were often attached to numerous Japanese divisions during the initial stages of the Pacific War. In contemporary Japan, these regiments are analogous to Reconnaissance battalions within the divisions of the Japan Ground Self-Defense Force.

== Historical background ==
During the Second Sino-Japanese War, Japanese military commanders frequently faced challenges requiring reconnaissance, rapid message transfer, and the utilization of maneuver warfare advantages. These tasks were typically carried out by cavalry regiments within the Japanese army (see Japanese cavalry regiments). However, the widespread adoption of the machine gun during the First World War revealed the significant vulnerability of horseback troops against defensive positions. Simultaneously, the rapid expansion of automobile production led to numerous experiments with motorized and mechanized cavalry units worldwide.

While Japan initially retained cavalry regiments and battalions, the introduction of the first batch of seven Sōsaku-tai (reconnaissance regiments) occurred in 1937-1938 as part of a significant army reorganization preceding the Pacific War. These units were later renamed as Sōsaku-rentai. By 1940, existing cavalry regiments had also been reorganized into reconnaissance regiments, although some cavalry units were retained. Notably, the Imperial Guard division maintained its cavalry regiment alongside a reconnaissance regiment. Additionally, the 3rd, 6th, 25th, and 26th cavalry regiments remained unchanged until the end of the Pacific War.

The cavalry regiment within the Imperial Guard division included an armoured car company, and many cavalry regiments unofficially acquired tanks, even after the formation of the 1st Tank Division (Imperial Japanese Army).

== Problems with concept ==
While the reconnaissance regiment was designed to integrate both Armoured fighting vehicles and Motorized infantry, the initial availability of vehicles for the army was limited. This occurred because vehicles like the Type 92 Heavy Armoured Car tankette, Type 94 tankette, and Type 97 Te-Ke tankette, intended for reconnaissance, were also tasked with combat roles and absorbed into tank regiments. Additionally, although the initial concept of the reconnaissance regiment envisioned it as a self-sufficient combat force, in practice (particularly during the Battles of Khalkhin Gol), mechanized forces were primarily used to reinforce under-equipped infantry units. Consequently, the supply of armoured vehicles proved to be grossly inadequate.

With the adoption of the Nanshin-ron strategy for the Pacific War, reconnaissance regiments initially saw success during the Japanese conquest of Burma. However, as operations shifted towards smaller islands, the limitations of light armoured vehicles became evident. This led to the frequent deployment of infantry forces to outlying islands while reconnaissance regiments remained on the mainland. Consequently, many reconnaissance regiments were disbanded as unnecessary, and personnel were reassigned to tank units. Although the Japanese army initially fielded 40 reconnaissance regiments, only 23 remained by the war's end, with 9 of them significantly under-strength.

== Orders of battle ==
Reconnaissance regiments were small-scale units, typically comprising about 500 men in total. As a result, they did not have battalions in their structure and were usually commanded by a Major, rather than a Colonel, as was typical for infantry regiments. The variation in the order of battle between regiments, and even within the same regiment at different times, was significant. Furthermore, the regiment was often tailored to fit into the available transport ship.

=== Order of battle (1937-1938) ===
- Headquarters
- Cavalry squadron
- Armored car company - 5 x Type 92 Heavy Armoured Car tankette or other available tankettes

=== Order of battle (1939-1941) ===
- Headquarters
- Cavalry squadron
- Motorized infantry company (with Type 94 6-Wheeled Truck, Type 95 reconnaissance car and other vehicles)
- Armored car company - 5-8 x various armored cars or tankettes (based on availability)

=== Order of battle (1942-1945, of infantry division) ===
This is the typical wartime reconnaissance regiment (with the most typical being the 2nd and 16th regiments). Compared to earlier versions, it has part of its horses replaced by Type 97 motorcycles.

- Headquarters
- 1st Cavalry squadron
- 2nd Cavalry squadron
- 1st Armored car company - 8 x tankettes
- 2nd Armored car company - 8 x tankettes
- Signals platoon

=== Order of battle (1942-1945, of tank division) ===
The first three tank divisions had the reconnaissance regiment attached. Due to a lack of Japanese self-propelled guns, these were frequently substituted with Type 97 Chi-Ha medium tanks or even light tanks.

- Headquarters
- 1st Light Tank Company - 10 x Type 95 Ha-Go or other light tanks
- 2nd Light Tank Company - 10 x Type 95 Ha-Go or other light tanks
- 3rd Light Tank Company (optional) - 10 x Type 95 Ha-Go or other light tanks
- Cavalry squadron
- Self-propelled artillery company - 10 x Self-propelled gun and 2 x Type 95 Ha-Go or other light tanks
- Maintenance company

== Notable military operations ==
=== 23rd division ===
During the Battles of Khalkhin Gol, the reconnaissance regiment of the 23rd Division was newly organized. During the Japanese advance in July 1939, it was tasked with cutting off the retreat route of the Soviet army. Although it reached its designated position, the failure of other units resulted in the regiment being surrounded and wiped out. Immediately reorganized, it was used to reinforce the Japanese defense at 47.89°N 118.58°E (Fui Height). Notably, the reconnaissance regiment was the only unit able to retreat from the height after running out of ammunition and food (all other troops were annihilated), and the regiment commander (Ioki Sasaki) pleaded guilty to unauthorized retreat before a court-martial.

=== 56th division ===
During the early stages of the Japanese conquest of Burma, the reconnaissance regiment of the 56th Division played an active role at the spearhead of the advance. The regiment landed in Yangon on March 26, 1942, and swiftly occupied Taungoo, 220 kilometers away, by April 1, 1942. Subsequently, a motorized infantry company and an engineer (bridging) company headed north, reaching Bhamo on May 4, 1942, after traveling over 1400 kilometers.

=== Battle of Leyte ===
The reconnaissance regiment of the 1st Division, reduced to a headquarters, infantry company, and machine gun platoon without any vehicles (comprising about 200 men in total), landed in Ormoc in late November 1944. After receiving horses and tanks from the 2nd Division, it occupied mountain-top positions and successfully defended critical passes for over a month against the 24th Infantry Division (United States). Despite other Japanese units in the vicinity beginning to retreat, the order to retreat encountered difficulties reaching the reconnaissance regiment, resulting in only 45 members of the regiment surviving.

== List of reconnaissance regiments ==
Number	From data-sort-type="date"	Comments
Guards	1 July 1940	-
1	1 June 1939	destroyed in Battle of Leyte
2	1 September 1940	-
4	1 June 1942	-
5	1 July 1940	-
7	1 August 1940	-
8	1 June 1939	destroyed in Battle of Luzon
10	1 July 1940	destroyed in Battle of Luzon
12	1 July 1940	-
14	1 July 1940	served with 18th div., returned to 14th div. in 1943
15	1 April 1938	disbanded in July 1940
16	1 July 1940	destroyed in Battle of Luzon
17/1	1 April 1938	disbanded in July 1940
17/2	1 July 1944	formed on New Britain from split 51st recon regiment
19	1 August 1940	merged with 103rd independent brigade in 1945
20	1 July 1940	left as independent unit in Korea
21	1 April 1938	disbanded in May 1941
22	1 April 1938	disbanded in July 1940
23	1 April 1938	used to re-organize division after the Battles of Khalkhin Gol. Destroyed in Battle of Luzon
24	1 November 1939	destroyed in Battle of Okinawa
26	1 September 1937	disbanded in July 1944
27	1 June 1938	disbanded in May 1943
30	1 May 1943	destroyed in Battle of Mindanao
32	1 February 1939	disbanded in May 1941
33	1 February 1939	disbanded in May 1941
34	1 February 1939	disbanded in May 1943
35	1 February 1939	disbanded in May 1941
36	1 February 1939	disbanded in May 1941
37	1 February 1939	disbanded in May 1941
38	1 February 1939	disbanded in May 1941
39	1 February 1939	demobilized after Surrender of Japan
42	1 May 1943	disbanded in April 1944
43	1 May 1943	disbanded in April 1944
46	1 May 1943	disbanded in October 1943
48	1 November 1940	-
50	1 May 1944	soon reinforced 48th recon regiment
51	1 July 1940	provisional unit, split in 1944
53	1 July 1940	-
54	1 July 1940	destroyed in Burma Campaign
56	1 July 1940	-
57	1 July 1940	fought in Soviet invasion of Manchuria
107	1 May 1944	-
119	1 November 1944	-
1(tank)	24 June 1942	transformed into 26th tank regiment
2(tank)	24 June 1942	transformed into 27th tank regiment
3(tank)	24 June 1942	-
