= 117th Division (Imperial Japanese Army) =

- 第117師団
- Active: 1944–1945
- Country: Empire of Japan
- Allegiance: 44th army
- Branch: Imperial Japanese Army
- Type: Infantry
- Size: 13694
- Garrison/HQ: Xinxiang
- Nickname: Expansive division

The 117th Division (第117師団, Dai-hyakujūnana Shidan) was an infantry division of the Imperial Japanese Army. Its call sign was the Expansive Division (弘兵団, Hiromu Heidan). It was formed 10 July 1944 in Xinxiang as a type-C(hei) security division, simultaneously with the 114th, 115th and 118th divisions. The nucleus for the formation was the 14th Independent Infantry Brigade. The division was initially assigned to the Twelfth Army.

== Action ==
Although slated for the Battle of West Henan–North Hubei, the 117th division was reassigned to the 44th army and sent to Taonan in April 1945. During the Soviet invasion of Manchuria, the 117th division was tasked with the defense of Liaoyuan and has surrendered to Red Army in Gongzhuling. The last soldiers were returned to Japan only in 1963.

== See also ==
- List of Japanese Infantry Divisions

== Notes and references ==
- This article incorporates material from Japanese Wikipedia page 第117師団 (日本軍), accessed 27 June 2016
- Madej, W. Victor, Japanese Armed Forces Order of Battle, 1937–1945 [2 vols], Allentown, PA: 1981.
