= Thirteenth Army (Japan) =

Japanese Thirteenth Army
- Japanese: 第13軍, romanized: Dai-jyūsan gun
- Active: September 23, 1939 - August 15, 1945
- Country: Empire of Japan
- Branch: Imperial Japanese Army
- Type: Infantry
- Role: Corps
- Garrison/HQ: Shanghai
- Nickname(s): Noboru (登, Ascending)

Commanders
- Notable commanders: Sadamu Shimomura

The Japanese 13th Army (第13軍, Dai-jyūsan gun) was an army of the Imperial Japanese Army during the Second Sino-Japanese War and World War II.

== History ==
The Japanese 13th Army was formed on September 23, 1939, under the control of the China Expeditionary Army. It was based in Shanghai and surrounding provinces primarily a garrison force to maintain public order and to engage in counter-insurgency operations in conjunction with the collaborationist forces of the Reformed Government of the Republic of China, and later with its successor, the Wang Jingwei Government. It was later tasked with deterring possible landings of the Allies in the lower Yangtze River area of east central China. It surrendered to the Chinese Kuomintang forces on August 15, 1945, at the surrender of Japan and was disbanded in Shanghai.

== List of commanders ==
=== Commanding officer ===
	Name	From	To
1	General Toshijiro Nishio	12 September 1939	26 October 1939
2	Lt. General Susumu Fujita	26 October 1939	2 December 1940
3	Lt. General Shigeru Sawada	2 December 1940	8 October 1942
4	Lt. General Sadamu Shimomura	8 October 1942	22 March 1944
5	Lt. General Sajishige Nagatsu	22 March 1944	1 February 1945
6	Lt. General Takuro Matsui	1 February 1945	15 August 1945

=== Chief of Staff ===
	Name	From	To
1	Lt. General Shozo Sakurai	4 September 1939	20 January 1941
2	Lt. General Masami Maeda	20 January 1941	19 September 1941
3	Major General Yasuo Karagawa	19 September 1941	1 December 1942
4	Major General Isami Kinoshita	1 December 1942	17 January 1944
5	Lt. General Shinnosuke Sasa	17 January 1944	22 November 1945
6	Major General Toshi Yamamoto	22 November 1944	1 February 1945
7	Major General Akio Doi	1 February 1944	1 September 1945

== Subordinate units ==
=== 1941 China Expeditionary Army ===
- 15th Infantry Division
- 17th Infantry Division
- 22nd Infantry Division
- 116th Infantry Division

=== 1945: 13th Army of the China Expeditionary Army ===
- 60th Infantry Division
- 61st Infantry Division
- 65th Infantry Division
- 69th Infantry Division
- 118th Infantry Division
- 161st Infantry Division
- 90th Independent Mixed Brigade (Imperial Japanese Army)
- 92nd Independent Mixed Brigade (Imperial Japanese Army)
- 6th Independent Infantry Brigade
