= 115th Division (Imperial Japanese Army) =

- 第115師団
- Active: 1944–1945
- Country: Empire of Japan
- Allegiance: 12th army
- Branch: Imperial Japanese Army
- Type: Infantry
- Garrison/HQ: Henan
- Nickname: North Division
- Engagements: Battle of West Henan–North Hubei

The 115th Division (第115師団, Dai-hyakujūgo Shidan) was an infantry division of the Imperial Japanese Army. Its call sign was North Division (北兵団, Kita Heidan). It was formed 10 July 1944 in Henan as a type-C(hei) security division, simultaneously with the 114th, 117th and 118th divisions. The nucleus for the formation was the 7th Independent Mixed Brigade. The division was initially assigned to the Twelfth Army.

== Action ==
In March 1945, the division was reinforced by a mortar company and sent to participate in the Battle of West Henan–North Hubei. In April 1945 it occupied Laohekou.

The division was detained in a labour camp in Henan after the surrender of Japan 15 August 1945. 23 April 1946, it sailed from Shanghai and arrived at Nagato, Yamaguchi 30 April 1946. The division was disbanded by 10 June 1946.

== See also ==
- List of Japanese Infantry Divisions
- Independent Mixed Brigades (Imperial Japanese Army)

== Notes and references ==
- This article incorporates material from Japanese Wikipedia page 第115師団 (日本軍), accessed 27 June 2016
- Madej, W. Victor, Japanese Armed Forces Order of Battle, 1937–1945 [2 vols], Allentown, PA: 1981.
