= 118th Division (Imperial Japanese Army) =

- 第118師団
- Active: 1944–1945
- Country: Empire of Japan
- Allegiance: 13th army
- Branch: Imperial Japanese Army
- Type: Infantry
- Garrison/HQ: Datong
- Nickname: Favor division
- Engagements: none

The 118th Division (第118師団, Dai-hyakujūhachi Shidan) was an infantry division of the Imperial Japanese Army. Its call sign was the Expansive Division (恵兵団, Megumi Heidan). It was formed 10 July 1944 in Datong as a type-C(hei) security division, simultaneously with the 114th, 115th and 117th divisions. The nucleus for the formation was the 9th independent infantry brigade. The division was initially assigned to the 13th army.

== Action ==
In April 1945, the 118th division was ordered to strengthen the garrisons in Central China and then in Shanghai area. Therefore, by the day of surrender of Japan 15 August 1945, the division was spread through Tianjin and Zhangjiakou.

After the cessation of hostilities, the 118th division has sailed from Tanggu District 14 April 1946, landed in Sasebo 18 April 1956, and has completed dissolution 21 April 1946.

== See also ==
- List of Japanese Infantry Divisions

== Notes and references ==
- This article incorporates material from Japanese Wikipedia page 第118師団 (日本軍), accessed 27 June 2016
- Madej, W. Victor, Japanese Armed Forces Order of Battle, 1937–1945 [2 vols], Allentown, PA: 1981.
