= Tsuchiya Mitsuharu =

Japanese general (1848–1920)

Baron Tsuchiya Mitsuharu
- 土屋 光春
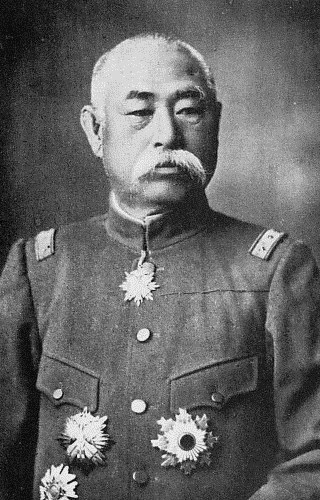
- Born: 23 September 1848; Okazaki, Aichi, Japan
- Died: 17 November 1920 (aged 72)
- Military career
- Allegiance: Empire of Japan
- Branch: Imperial Japanese Army
- Service years: 1870–1915
- Rank: General
- Commands: IJA 11th Division, IJA 14th Division, IJA 4th Division
- Conflicts: Satsuma Rebellion; First Sino-Japanese War; Russo-Japanese War

Baron Tsuchiya Mitsuharu (土屋 光春; 23 September 1848 – 17 November 1920) was a general in the early Imperial Japanese Army.

== Biography ==
Tsuchiya was born as the fourth son to a samurai family named Watari of the Okazaki Domain (present day Aichi prefecture), and was adopted into the Tsuchiya family as a child. He was sent by the domain to the predecessor of the Imperial Japanese Army Academy when it was still located in Osaka and was commissioned as a second lieutenant in the fledgling Imperial Japanese Army in 1870. He participated in the suppression of the Saga Rebellion and the Satsuma Rebellion.

During the First Sino-Japanese War, Tsuchiya served on the staff of the Imperial General Headquarters. After the war, he commanded the IJA 27th Infantry Brigade, the IJA 1st Taiwan Reserve Combined Brigade and the 1st Guards Brigade. In 1902, he was promoted to lieutenant general.

After the start of the Russo-Japanese War, Tsuchiya was given command of the IJA 11th Infantry Division under General Nogi Maresuke’s Japanese Third Army at the Siege of Port Arthur. His forces took heavy casualties, and Tsuchiya himself was wounded by a gunshot to the head while leading his troops in combat. After a period back in Japan to recover, he returned to Manchuria as commander of the newly formed IJA 14th Infantry Division. In September 1907, Tsuchiya was ennobled with the title of baron (danshaku) under the kazoku peerage system. In December 1908, Tsuchiya became commander of the IJA 4th Infantry Division. On 28 August 1910, he was promoted to general, and entered the reserves on the same day. He retired on 1 April 1915, and died after illness in November 1920. He was posthumously promoted to the honorific title of Junior Second Court Rank.

His son, Tsuchiya Mitsukane was a vice admiral in the Imperial Japanese Navy during the First Sino-Japanese War and Russo-Japanese War, and was subsequently a member of the House of Peers (Japan).

== Decorations ==
- 1893 – Order of the Sacred Treasure, 3rd class
- 1895 – Order of the Rising Sun, 3rd class
- 1895 – Order of the Golden Kite, 4th class
- 1902 - Order of the Sacred Treasure, 2nd class
- 1906 – Grand Cordon of the Order of the Rising Sun
- 1906 – Order of the Golden Kite, 2nd class

=== Foreign ===
- 1896 – Russia - Order of Saint Stanislaus, 2nd class
