= 14th Division (Imperial Japanese Army) =

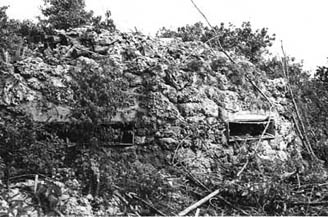
- Fortifications of Peleliu Island constructed by the 14th Division
- Active: 1905–1944
- Country: Empire of Japan
- Branch: Imperial Japanese Army
- Type: Infantry
- Size: 25,000 men
- Garrison/HQ: Utsunomiya, Tochigi
- Nickname: Shining Division
- Engagements: Russo-Japanese War; Second Sino-Japanese War; Pacific War

Commanders
- Notable commanders: Tsuchiya Mitsuharu; Samejima Shigeo; Uehara Yusaku; Hata Shunroku; Kenji Doihara

The 14th Division (第14師団, Dai Jūyon Shidan) was an infantry division in the Imperial Japanese Army. Its tsūshōgō code name was the Shining Division (照兵団, Teru Heidan), and its military symbol was 14D. The 14th Division was one of four new infantry divisions raised by the Imperial Japanese Army (IJA) in the closing stages of the Russo-Japanese War, after it turned out that the entire IJA was committed to combat in Manchuria, leaving not a single division to guard the Japanese home islands from attack.

The 14th Division was initially established in Kokura (present-day Kitakyushu, Fukuoka) under the command of Lieutenant General Tsuchiya Mitsuharu, with men recruited from Osaka, Zentsūji, Kagawa, Hiroshima and Kumamoto.

== Action ==
=== Russo-Japanese War ===
It was the only one of the four emergency divisions raised that was considered combat-ready (albeit still severely understrength) prior to the end of the war, on 5 September 1905. It was dispatched to the front in August 1905, where it joined General Nogi Maresuke's IJA Third Army. However, it arrived too late to see any combat, and was assigned policing duties in the Japanese-occupied Liaodong Peninsula and along the South Manchurian Railway in August 1905. It was replaced by the 10th division in 1906, and was withdrawn to Himeji, Hyōgo.

=== Reorganization ===
In September 1907 the divisional headquarters was established in what is now the city of Utsunomiya, Tochigi, and its composition totally reorganized. The 53rd Infantry Regiment was transferred to the 16th division in Kyoto and the 54th Infantry Regiment was transferred to the newly created 17th division based in Okayama. The 55th Infantry Regiment and 56th Infantry Regiments were transferred to the newly created 18th division, based in Kurume, Fukuoka. In place of these units, the division gained the Sakura-based 2nd Infantry Regiment (in April 1908 relocated to Mito, Ibaraki), as well as the Takasaki-based 15th Infantry Regiment and the newly created Utsunomiya-based 66th Infantry Regiment. By the 23 October 1908, the reorganization was complete with the transfer of the 28th infantry brigade headquarters, 18th cavalry regiment, 20th field artillery regiment and the 14th logistics regiment to Utsunomiya. The 59th infantry regiment also joined division in 1909, been relocated to Utsunomiya from Narashino.

=== Siberia and Manchuria ===
In April 1918, the 14th Division was one of the Japanese divisions earmarked for the Japanese intervention in Siberia, actually starting to participate in August 1919. In March–May 1920, the 3rd Battalion of the IJA 2nd Infantry Regiment stationed at Nikolayevsk-on-Amur was massacred by Bolshevik irregulars in what came to be known as the Nikolaevsk Incident (尼港事件, Niko Jiken). The 14th division has returned to Japan in August–November 1920.

In March 1925, the 66th Infantry Regiment was disbanded, and replaced by the Matsumoto-based IJA 50th Infantry Regiment. Also, the 27th infantry brigade headquarters was moved from Mito to Utsunomiya while 28th infantry brigade headquarters transferred to Takasaki. The 14th Division was deployed to Ryojun in the Kwantung Leased Territory in April 1927. Units from the division were deployed to Jinan and Qingdao in 1928 in the aftermath of the Jinan Incident. The 14th Division returned to Japan in 1929.

In 1932, the 14th Division was again deployed to Manchuria under the aegis of the Kwantung Army and was involved in the January 28 Incident. It also participated in the March 1932 Mukden Incident. Its 2nd battalion of the 2nd Infantry regiment also participated in the Battle of Rehe in May 1932. The 14th Division was withdrawn back to Japan in 1934.

=== Second Sino-Japanese War ===
The outbreak of general hostilities in the Second Sino-Japanese War in 1937 put the 14th Division under the command of Lieutenant General Kenji Doihara was reassigned to the Northern China Area Army theater of operations and as part of the IJA 1st Army participated in the Beiping–Hankou Railway Operation, proceeding by Baoding - Shanxi - Xuzhou route. In 1938, the 14th division has participated in the campaign of Northern and Eastern Honan where it was involved in the Battle of Lanfeng. Meanwhile, in April 1938, the relocation of the 14th division to the China was made permanent and the 22nd division was established in Utsunomiya headquarters.

After finishing a term on the front-line in 1939, the 14th Division was sent to Qiqihar in Manchukuo to serve as a garrison force. In August 1940, the division was re-organized into a triangular division, with the IJA 50th Infantry Regiment transferred to the 29th division. Approximately at this period, demobilized Japanese soldiers have brought the fried Jiaozi local recipe, known in Japanese as gyōza, from Manchukuo to Japan. As the troops from the 14th Division were mostly from Utsunomiya, the Utsunomiya has become known throughout Japan for its gyōza. In September 1941, the division was ordered back to line at the Mongolian border at Handagai (south-east of Nomonhan).

According to the divisional commander's report in January 1940, from the start of the war until its return from China, the 14th Division in North China suffered a total of approximately 12,800 losses including approximately 3,200 killed in action, died of wounds, and died of illnesses and approximately 7,200 wounded.

=== Pacific War ===
In August 1942, the 14th Division was sent back to Manchukuo, and assigned to garrison duty. As the situation in the Pacific War against the United States continued to deteriorate, the Supreme War Council began transferring forces out of Manchukuo to the southern operational areas. The 14th Division under the command of Lieutenant General Sadae Inoue was assigned to Palau 24 April 1944, with its 2nd regiment and 3rd battalion of 15th regiment were sent to the island of Peleliu, one battalion of its 59th Infantry Regiment stationed on the island of Angaur, and the rest of the 59th regiment and 15th regiment were sent to the Babeldaob island along with divisional headquarters. Before departure, the infantry regiments were reorganized, absorbing divisional engineers, artillery, transport and reconnaissance units. The loss of machine cannon company during transportation also has resulted in abandonment of the plans to deploy a newly created 22nd independent mixed engineer regiment to the western New Guinea.

The subsequent Battle of Peleliu and Battle of Angaur were among the fiercest of the Pacific War. At Angaur, 1338 of the 1400 defenders were killed, and at Peleliu, 10,695 of the 11,000 defenders perished from 15 September 1944 to 24 November 1944. As the troops on Peleliu were wiped out, the transfer of the 2nd battalion of 15th regiment to Peleliu was cancelled. Babeldaob was never invaded, but the units stationed there suffered severe casualties due to airstrikes and starvation.

== See also ==
- List of Japanese Infantry Divisions

== Reference and further reading ==
- Madej, W. Victor. Japanese Armed Forces Order of Battle, 1937-1945 2 vol. Allentown, PA; 1981
- Gutman, Anatoly. Ella Lury Wiswell (trans.); Richard A. Pierce (ed.) The Destruction of Nikolaevsk-on-Amur, An Episode in the Russian Civil War in the Far East, 1920. Limestone Press (1993). ISBN 0-919642-35-7
- Morison, Samuel Eliot (2011) [1958]. Leyte: June 1944 - Jan 1945. History of United States Naval Operations in World War II. Vol. 12. Annapolis: Naval Institute Press. ISBN 978-1-59114-535-6.
- Anderson, Charles R. Western Pacific. The U.S. Army Campaigns of World War II. United States Army Center of Military History. CMH Pub 72-29. Archived from the original on 2012-02-03.
- This article incorporates material from the Japanese Wikipedia page 第14師団 (日本軍), accessed 16 February 2016.
