= 69th Division (Imperial Japanese Army) =

- Active: 1942–1945
- Country: Empire of Japan
- Branch: Imperial Japanese Army
- Type: Infantry
- Role: garrison
- Garrison/HQ: Linfen
- Nickname: Winning division
- Engagements: Battle of Changde; Operation Ichi-Go

Commanders
- Notable commanders: Sadae Inoue

The 69th Division (第69師団, Dai-rokujūkyū Shidan) was an infantry division of the Imperial Japanese Army. Its call sign was the Winning Division (勝兵団, Katsu Heidan). It was formed on 2 February 1942 in Linfen city as a class C (security) division, simultaneously with the 68th and 70th divisions. The backbone of security division has consisted of the eight independent infantry battalions, and it does not have an artillery regiment. The nucleus for the formation was the 16th Independent mixed brigade and a reservists from the former 108th division, recruited from Hirosaki mobilization district.

== Action ==
The division was assigned to the 1st army upon formation, with the task of providing a garrison to the central and west parts of the Shanxi province. In autumn 1943, it fought in Lanshan County as a part of the Battle of Changde.

In March 1944, divisional headquarters has moved to Yuncheng and 69th division has started participating in Operation Ichi-Go from May 1944. After the offensive stopped in April 1945, the 69th division was transferred for garrison duty in Jiading District under command of the 13th army, where it stayed until the surrender of Japan 15 August 1945.

== See also ==
- List of Japanese Infantry Divisions
- Independent Mixed Brigades (Imperial Japanese Army)

== Notes ==
- This article incorporates material from Japanese Wikipedia page 第69師団 (日本軍), accessed 20 June 2016

== Reference and further reading ==
- Madej, W. Victor. Japanese Armed Forces Order of Battle, 1937-1945 [2 vols]

Allentown, PA: 1981
