= 15th Division (Imperial Japanese Army) =

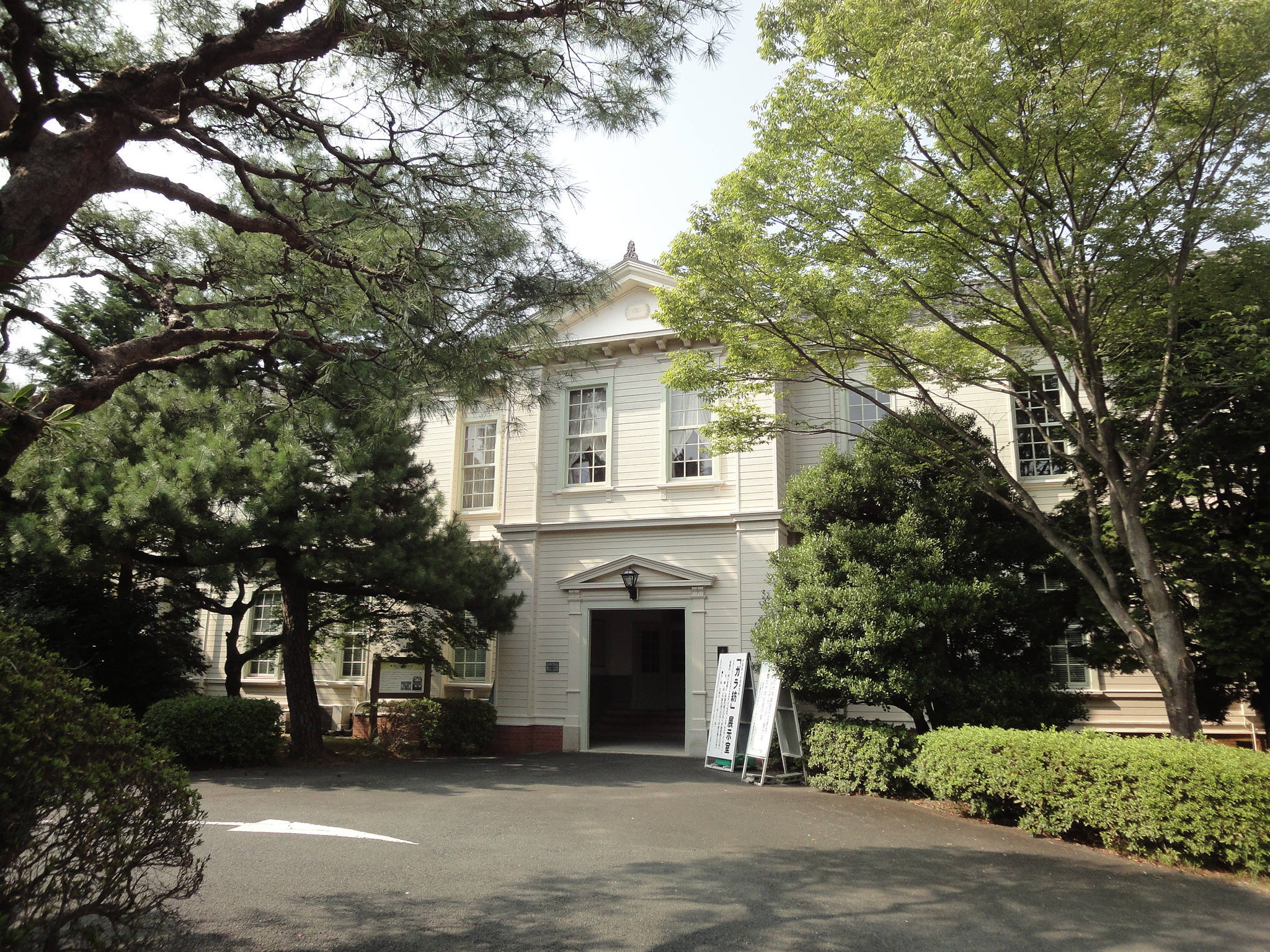
- former IJA 15th Division HQ in Toyohashi, Aichi
- Active: 1 April 1905 – May 1925; 4 April 1938 – 1945
- Country: Empire of Japan
- Branch: Imperial Japanese Army
- Type: Infantry
- Size: 25,000 men / 15,000 men
- Garrison/HQ: Toyohashi, Aichi, Japan
- Nickname: Festival Division
- Engagements: Russo-Japanese War; Second Sino-Japanese War; World War II

Commanders
- Notable commanders: Prince Nashimoto Morimasa, Minami Jiro, and Kanji Ishiwara

The 15th Division (第15師団, Dai Jūgo Shidan) was an infantry division in the Imperial Japanese Army. Its tsūshōgō code name was the Festival Division (祭兵団, Sai Heidan), and its military symbol was 15D. The 15th Division was one of four new infantry divisions raised by the Imperial Japanese Army in the closing stages of the Russo-Japanese War (1904–1905). With Japan's limited resources towards the end of that conflict, the entire IJA was committed to combat in Manchuria, leaving not a single division to guard the Japanese home islands from attack. The 15th Division was initially raised from men in the area surrounding Nagoya under the command of Lieutenant General Okihara Kofu.

== Action ==
=== Interwar period ===
The Treaty of Portsmouth was concluded before the 15th division could be deployed to Manchuria, and it was sent instead to Korea as a garrison force. 24 March 1907, the logistics battalion was transferred to the military school in Ushigome, and entire division has moved to Narashino, Chiba on 28 March 1907. The division was re-assembled 15 November 1908 in its original divisional headquarters located in Toyohashi, Aichi prefecture.

However, on 1 May 1925, it was dissolved by Minister of War Ugaki Kazushige as part of a cost-saving measure during the Kato Takaaki administration, together with the 13th, 17th and 18th divisions.

=== Second Sino-Japanese War ===
In July 1937, open hostilities broke out against China and the Second Sino-Japanese War commenced. The 15th Division was re-established in Kyoto on 4 April 1938 as a triangular division, from the reserve forces of the IJA 16th Division. Under the command of Lieutenant General Yoshio Iwamatsu, it was assigned to mainland China as a garrison force around Nanjing and to maintain public safety over Japanese-occupied areas.

=== Battle of Imphal ===
On 17 June 1943 the 15th division was reassigned to the IJA 15th Army in Burma as part of an impending offensive against British India, with Nanjing garrison taken by newly formed 61st division. The division was delayed with road-building in Thailand for several months. Arriving in Burma, the division took part in the attack on Imphal as part of the Operation U-Go along with the IJA 31st and 33rd Divisions, followed by the Battle of Meiktila and Mandalay. During these operations, the division lost more than half of its men in combat or due to disease, and was forced out of Burma into Thailand in August 1945 days before the end of the war, where it was officially disbanded.

Operation U-Go was planned to start in the beginning of March 1944, but because of 15th Division's slow arrival start of the offensive was postponed to 15 March. The 15th Division formed the central position of the three attacking divisions, and its primary objective was to cut the road between Imphal and Kohima at Kangpokpi. On the map this was the shortest and most direct route towards Imphal, but the division had to cross difficult terrain with only poor tracks. Because of the difficult terrain, the division's field artillery was replaced with mountain guns and the anti-tank equipment was left behind. Of the division's nine battalions, one had been detached to the force dealing with the second Chindits operation, and most of its 67th Regiment was still in Thailand.

Thus, the 15th Division started the campaign with 6 battalions, 18 guns and a commander, Lieutenant-General Masafumi Yamauchi, who mortally ill with tuberculosis. Soon it had to be urged onwards by the commander of 15th Army, General Renya Mutaguchi A British force at Sangshak was within 15th Division's operational area, but because of its slow speed, units from the 31st Division assaulted this position on 23 March. The 60th Regiment arrived soon after, but was not allowed to take part in the final assault 27 March. The 15th Division cut the Imphal-Kohima road at Kangpokpi on 3 April. Soon the division occupied Nunshigum Ridge, which overlooked Imphal. From here the Japanese could threaten the headquarters of the IV Corps; this also marked the closest they would come to Imphal. The British counterattack on this ridge included M3 Lee tanks, which came as a shock to the Japanese as they had considered the terrain to be completely impassable to armored vehicles. The tanks proved decisive – although the British suffered heavy losses, the defending Japanese battalion was almost annihilated. Despite this setback Yamauchi continued his encirclement of Imphal from the north. The British commander, General Geoffry Scoones drew the conclusion that the 15th Division was the weakest link in the Japanese front and ordered Indian 23rd Infantry Division and Indian 5th Infantry Division to destroy it. In the following months the British with their superiority in numbers and almost unstoppable tanks drove the Japanese off one hill after another.

In the middle of June the Japanese 31st Division began retreating from Kohima after suffering heavy casualties. This left the 60th Regiment blocking the Imphal-Kohima road in an impossible situation and the British broke through and reopened the road on 22 June. The next day saw a change in command, with Yamauchi replaced by Lieutenant-General Ryuichi Shibata. On 7 July the division received orders for a last-ditch attack on Pallel, but by now it had been shattered as a military formation; its remnants retreated across the Chindwin River to safety.

=== Battle of Meiktila and Mandalay ===
After the defeat at Imphal and Allied advances in the north, the Japanese forces in Burma were forced on the defensive to try to stop the Allies from crossing the Irrawaddy. In January 1945 the 15th Division, together with the 53rd Division, was thrown into the defense of Mandalay. The division had received some reinforcements, but at 4500 men it was still less than half of nominal strength.

The opposing, Indian 19th Infantry Division, established its first bridgeheads on the eastern side of the Irrawaddy on 14 January and all attempts to dislodge them failed. After a rapid build-up, the British commander, General Thomas Wynford Rees ordered his men forward. Brushing aside all opposition, its forward elements were within sight of Mandalay 7 March. The 15th Division, now under the command of Major-General Kyoe Yamamoto, had received orders to defend the former Burmese capital to the last man. Of the two main positions, the Japanese were driven off Mandalay Hill by 12 March, but the thick walls of Fort Dufferin withstood artillery and air bombardment. On 18 March the division received new orders allowing its withdrawal, which it did through the sewers on the night of 19 March.

By this time the Japanese position in Burma had completely collapsed. The survivors of the 15th Division (less than half its original strength of 15,000 men) retreated via the territory of the hostile Karen people and through the Southern Shan States, back into Kachanaburi, Thailand, where it remained at the time of the surrender of Japan 15 August 1945.

== See also ==
- List of Japanese Infantry Divisions

== Reference and further reading ==
- Madej, W. Victor. Japanese Armed Forces Order of Battle, 1937–1945 [2 vols] Allentown, PA: 1981
- Louis Allen, Burma: The longest War, Dent Publishing, 1984, ISBN 0-460-02474-4
- Jon Latimer, Burma: The Forgotten War, London: John Murray, 2004 ISBN 0-7195-6576-6
- This article incorporates material from the Japanese Wikipedia page 第15師団 (日本軍), accessed 18 February 2016
