= Tsūshōgō =

Tsūshōgō (通称号) were unit code names used by the Imperial Japanese Army (IJA) during World War II.

Each tsūshōgō consisted of a "Unit Character Code" (兵団文字符, Heidan Mojifu) and a "Code Number" (通称番号, tsūshō bangō). Unit Character Codes typically consisted of one character, although some units established in the late stages of the war had two-character codes. Unmobilized units were assigned area codes, such as "east" (東部, tōbu) for those units under the jurisdiction of the Eastern District Army. Code Numbers were three to five digit long numbers unique to each IJA unit.

For example, the 116th Division was assigned Arashi (嵐, "storm") as its Unit Character Code. The tsūshōgō of some of its subordinate units were:

- Arashi 6212 - 120th Infantry Regiment (嵐第6212部隊, Arashi Dai 6212 Butai)
- Arashi 6213 - 109th Infantry Regiment
- Arashi 6214 - 133rd Infantry Regiment
- Arashi 6222 - 122nd Field Artillery Regiment
- Arashi 6225 - 116th Construction Regiment
- Arashi 6227 - 116th Transport Regiment

Unit 731 is another example of a tsūshōgō. Officially named the Epidemic Prevention and Water Purification Department for the Kwantung Army (関東軍防疫給水部本部), the unit was assigned the code name Manshū 731. Manshū (満州, "Manchuria") was the Unit Character Code assigned to some units of the Kwantung Army.
