= Shigeru Sawada =

Japanese officer, war criminal (1887–1980)

- 沢田 茂
- Born: March 29, 1887; Kochi, Japan
- Died: December 1, 1980 (aged 93); Yokosuka, Kanagawa, Japan
- Military career
- Allegiance: Empire of Japan
- Branch: Imperial Japanese Army
- Service years: 1905–1945
- Rank: Lieutenant General
- Conflicts: World War II

Shigeru Sawada (沢田 茂, Sawada Shigeru; March 29, 1887 – December 1, 1980) was a career military officer and a lieutenant general in the Imperial Japanese Army during World War II.

== Biography ==
Sawada was the third son of a farmer in what is now the Kamobe neighborhood of the city of Kochi, Kōchi Prefecture. After attending military preparatory schools in Kōchi and Hiroshima, he graduated from the 18th class of the Imperial Japanese Army Academy in 1905, serving as a junior officer in an artillery regiment. In 1910, he was sent to the Artillery Engineering School, and to the 26th class of the Army War College in 1914. On graduation, he was assigned to the Record and Documentation Bureau of Imperial Japanese Army General Staff, where he was assigned to the task of compiling an official record of the Russo-Japanese War. In January 1918, while still under the General Staff Office, he was assigned to accompany Japanese forces in the Japanese intervention in Siberia, and was assigned to the staff at Vladivostok and Omsk. Already fluent in the French language, he also studied then Russian language, until he was forced to return to Japan due to typhus in February 1921. In November 1922, despite being an expert in Soviet affairs, he was assigned as a military attache to Greece. In August 1926, he was promoted to lieutenant colonel and served as an instructor at the Army Staff College. he became director of the Harbin Special Agency from November 1928. In October 1930, he was promoted to colonel.

From August 1931, Sawada was commander of the IJA 24th Field Artillery Regiment. He returned to teach at the Staff College from March 1933, and was then assigned as chief-of-staff of the Guards Artillery Division. From March 1935, he was promoted to major general and commanded the IJA 1st Field Artillery Brigade. Sawada was then sent as a military attache to Poland in December 1935, returning to Japan in March 1938. While serving in Poland, Sawada advocated the formation of a German-Polish-Japanese alliance against the Soviet Union. He was promoted to lieutenant general in March 1938.

In July 1938, he was assigned command of the IJA 4th Division. Although active in combat in the Second Sino-Japanese War both before and after Sawada's term as commander, while Sawada was in command, the division was a garrison force for Chahar Province in Inner Mongolia. He returned to the General Staff in September 1939, becoming Vice Chief-of-Staff from Wang Jingwei Government. He returned to Japan in October 1942 and retired one month later. Although retired, he continue to serve as a member of the Military Research Committee until the end of the war.

After the surrender of Japan, Sawada was arrested by the American occupation authorities and charged with command responsibility for war crimes in conjunction with the execution of surviving airmen of the Doolittle Raid who had been captured in China. He was found guilty by the US Military Commission in Shanghai and was sentenced to five years in prison with hard labor. The sentence was notably lenient since the commission took into account that Sawada had protested the death sentences of the three prisoners who were illegally executed, but was overruled. He was returned to Tokyo's Sugamo Prison to serve his sentence. He was released from prison in January 1950. He died in 1980 at the age of 93.
