= Okinawa ground order of battle =

Order of battle for World War II battle

Location of Ryukyus and beach assignments on Okinawa

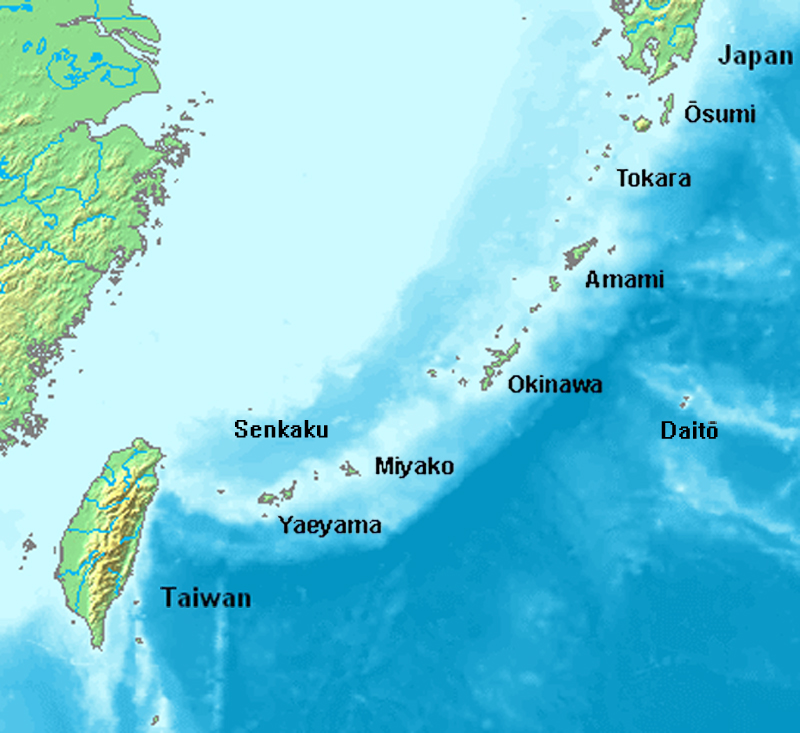
Map of the Ryukyu Island chain showing its strategic location between Formosa and Kyushu, the southernmost of the Japanese Home Islands

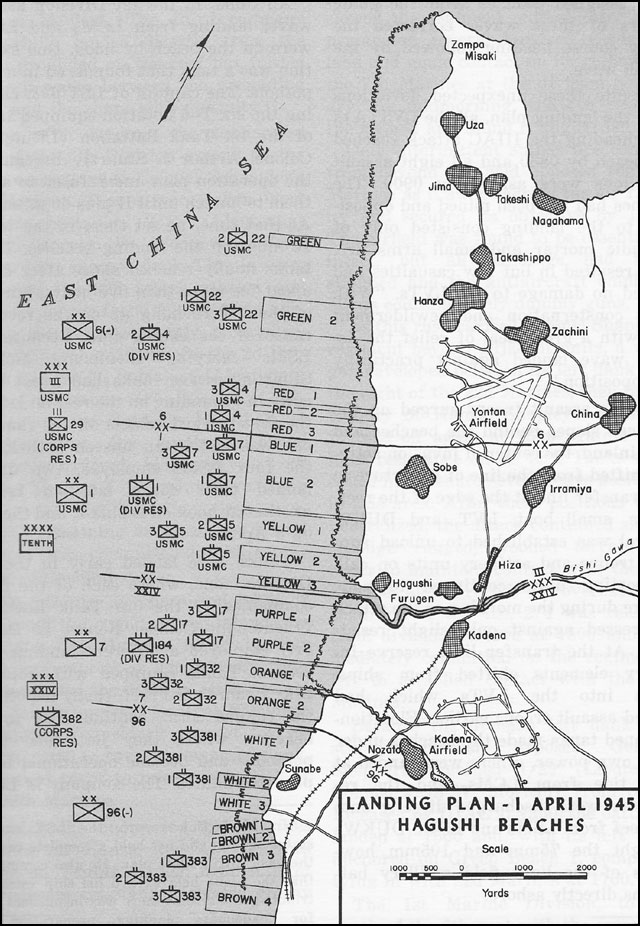
Landing beaches on Okinawa

US ground force commanders on Okinawa

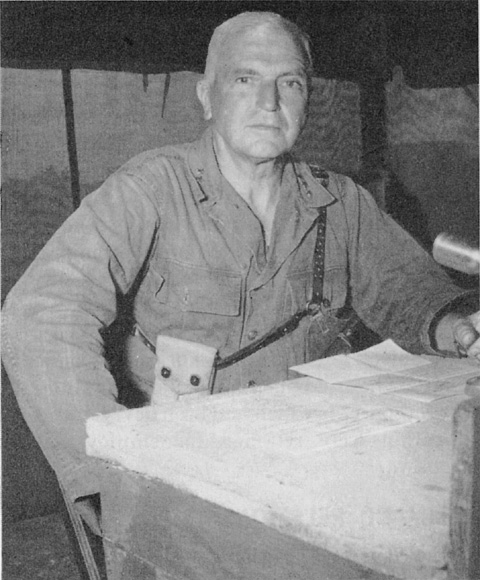
Lt. Gen. Simon B. Buckner, USA (KIA)

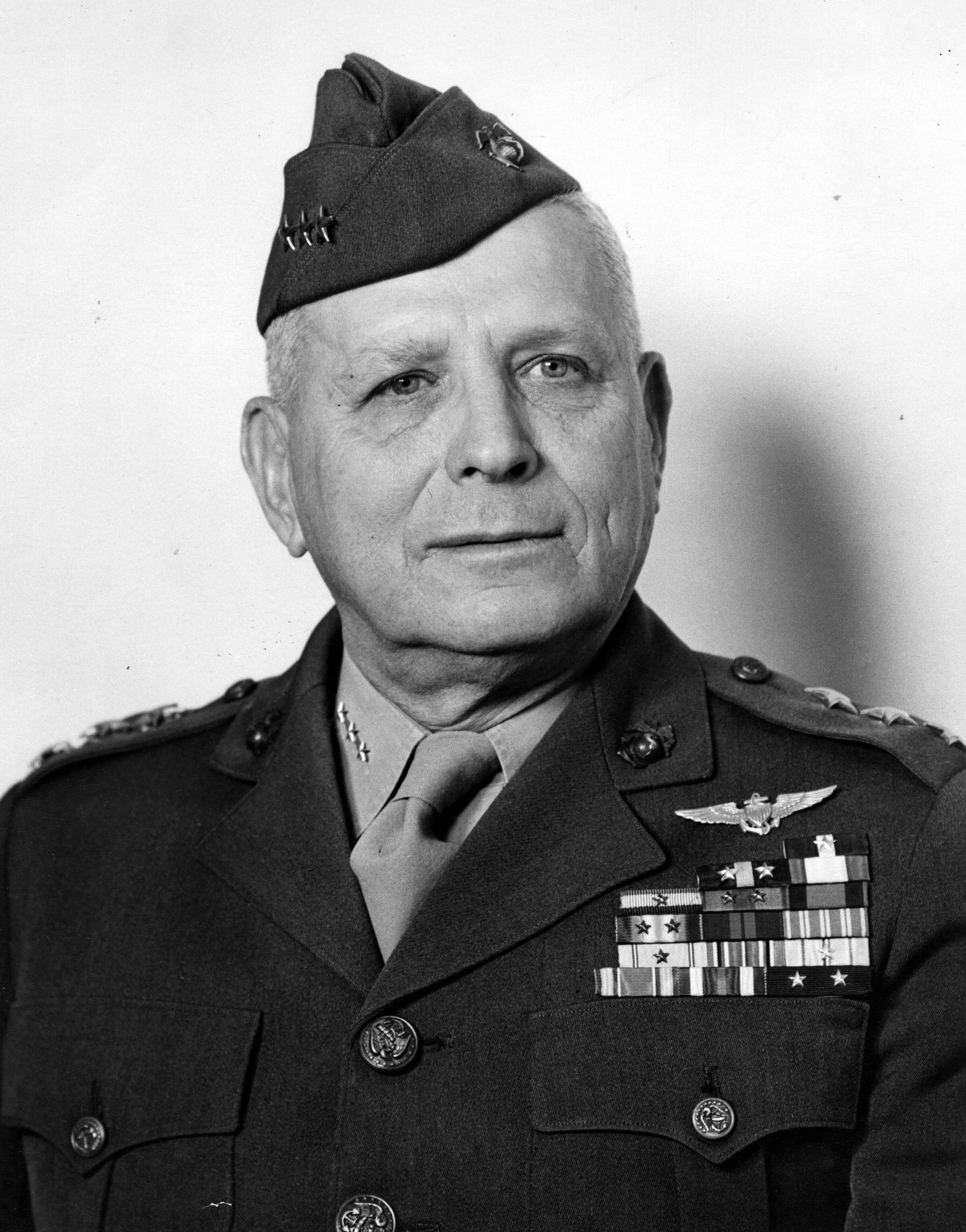
Maj Gen. Roy S. Geiger, USMC

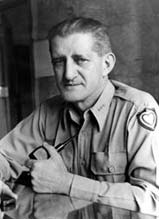
Maj. Gen. John R. Hodge, USA

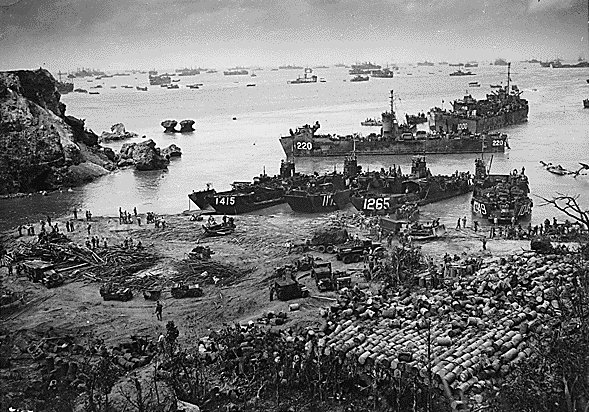
LCTs unloading at Yellow Beach, Okinawa, 13 April 1945.

This is the order of battle for the US invasion of the island of Okinawa, the largest island of the Ryukyu chain. This offensive, called Operation Iceberg by its planners, was the final Allied offensive in the Pacific Theater of Operations in World War II.

The defending Japanese military was determined to inflict a casualty rate so high that the U.S. government would choose not to invade the Japanese home islands. To this end, the southern portion of Okinawa had been covered with the most extensive system of fortifications and interlocking fields of fire the Americans had yet encountered in the Pacific Theatre. In anticipation of this level of resistance, five full divisions, two Marine and three Army, were committed to the struggle.

The initial American landings took place on 1 April 1945 and the island was not declared secure until 22 June, a period of 82 days, far longer than was expected by US planners. Four days before the end of the campaign, Lieutenant General Simon Bolivar Buckner Jr. became the highest ranking U.S. military officer to be killed in action in the Second World War.

== Summary of opposing ground forces ==
United States

US Tenth Army
Lieutenant General Simon Bolivar Buckner Jr., USA (KIA 18 Jun)

III Amphibious Corps
Major General Roy S. Geiger, USMC

Left: 6th Marine Division (24,356 officers and enlisted)
Right: 1st Marine Division (26,274 officers and enlisted)

XXIV Army Corps
Major General John R. Hodge, USA

Left: 7th Infantry ("Bayonet") Division (21,929 officers and enlisted)
Right: 96th Infantry ("Deadeye") Division (22,330 officers and enlisted)
Reserve: 27th Infantry ("New York") Division (16,143 officers and enlisted)

Japan

For most of the war, the Japanese had not considered Okinawa vital to their defensive arrangements. US progress in the Central Pacific led them to activate the Thirty-Second Army (Note: A Japanese army was equivalent to a Euro-American corps.) on the island in April 1944. In June, 5,000 men of the 44th Independent Mixed Brigade were lost at sea when their transport was torpedoed by a US submarine. The 9th Division, a veteran unit, was intended for Okinawa but was stranded on Formosa when the high command decided it couldn't risk more slow-moving transports in the East China Sea. The unprecedented American casualty figures would almost certainly have been considerably higher had these men made it to Okinawa.

(Empire of Japan) Japanese Thirty-Second Army (Note: A Japanese army was equivalent to a Euro-American corps.)
Lieutenant General Mitsuru Ushijima (seppuku 22 Jun)
Approx. 67,000 men under arms, incl. 5,000 Okinawan conscripts

24th Division
62nd Division
44th Independent Mixed Brigade

== American forces ==
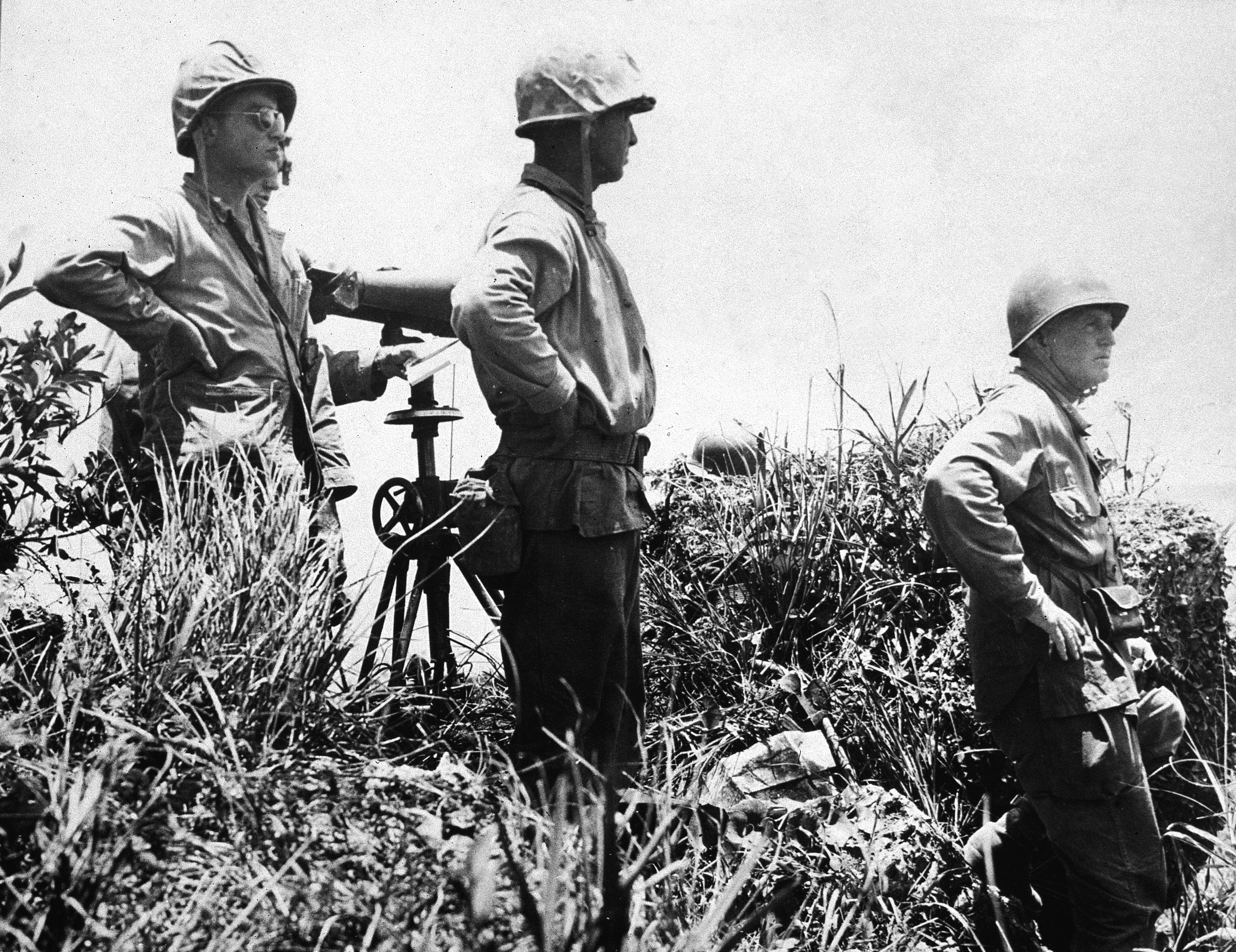
Final photograph of Lt. Gen. Simon B. Buckner (right) just before being killed by a Japanese artillery round on Okinawa

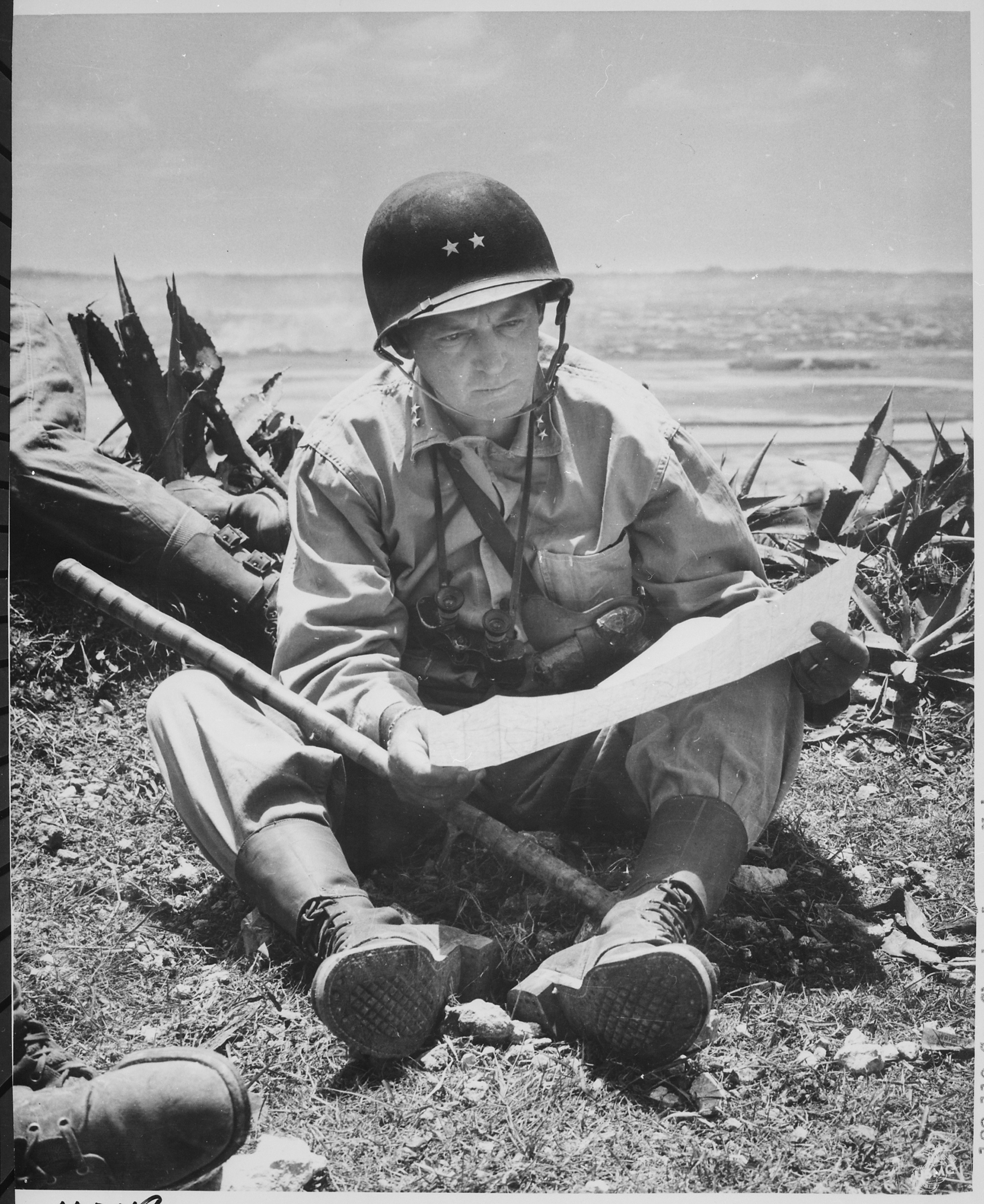
Maj. Gen. Lemuel C. Shepherd with Okinawan capital of Naha in background

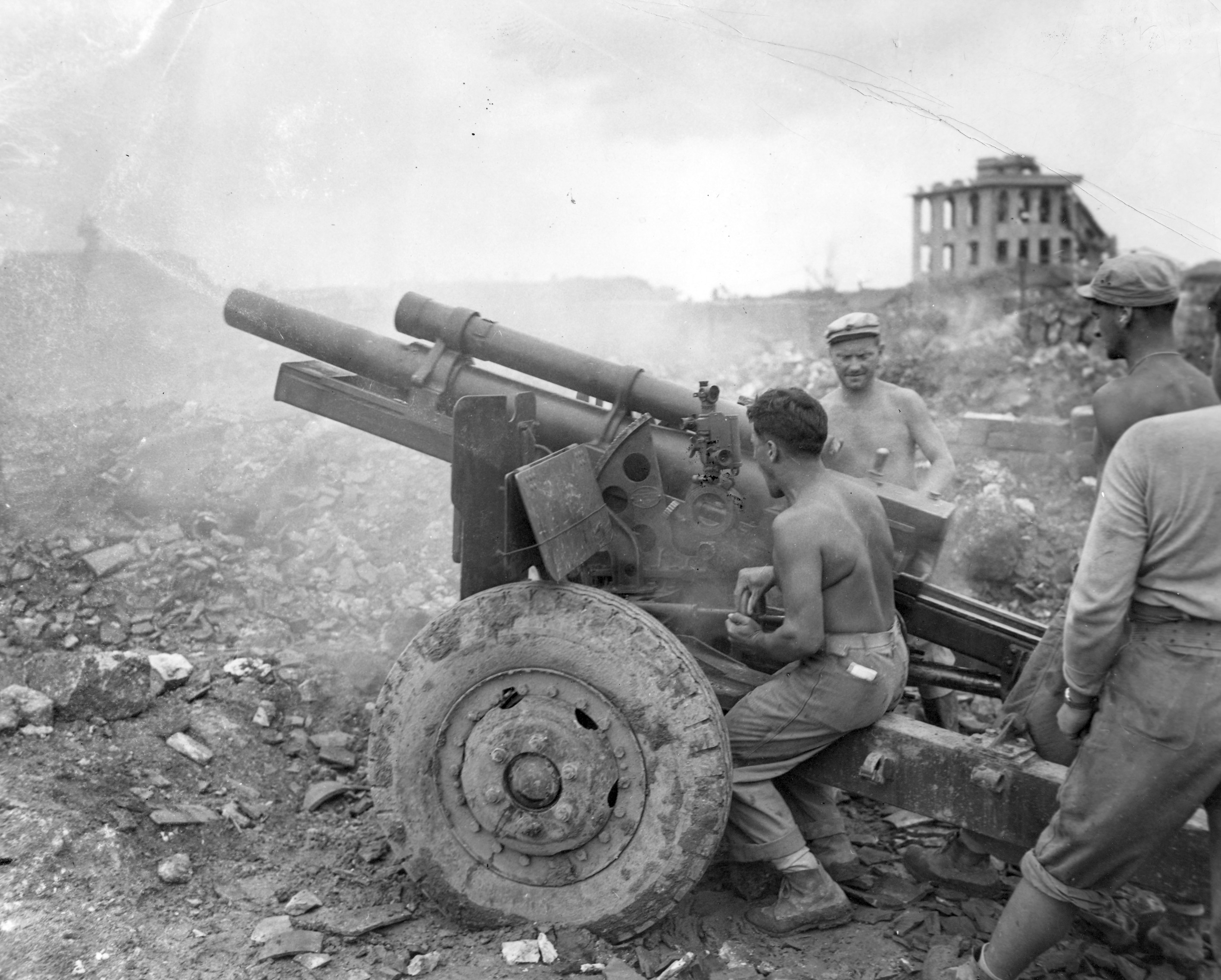
A 105mm howitzer crew of the 15th Marines in action in Naha, Okinawa

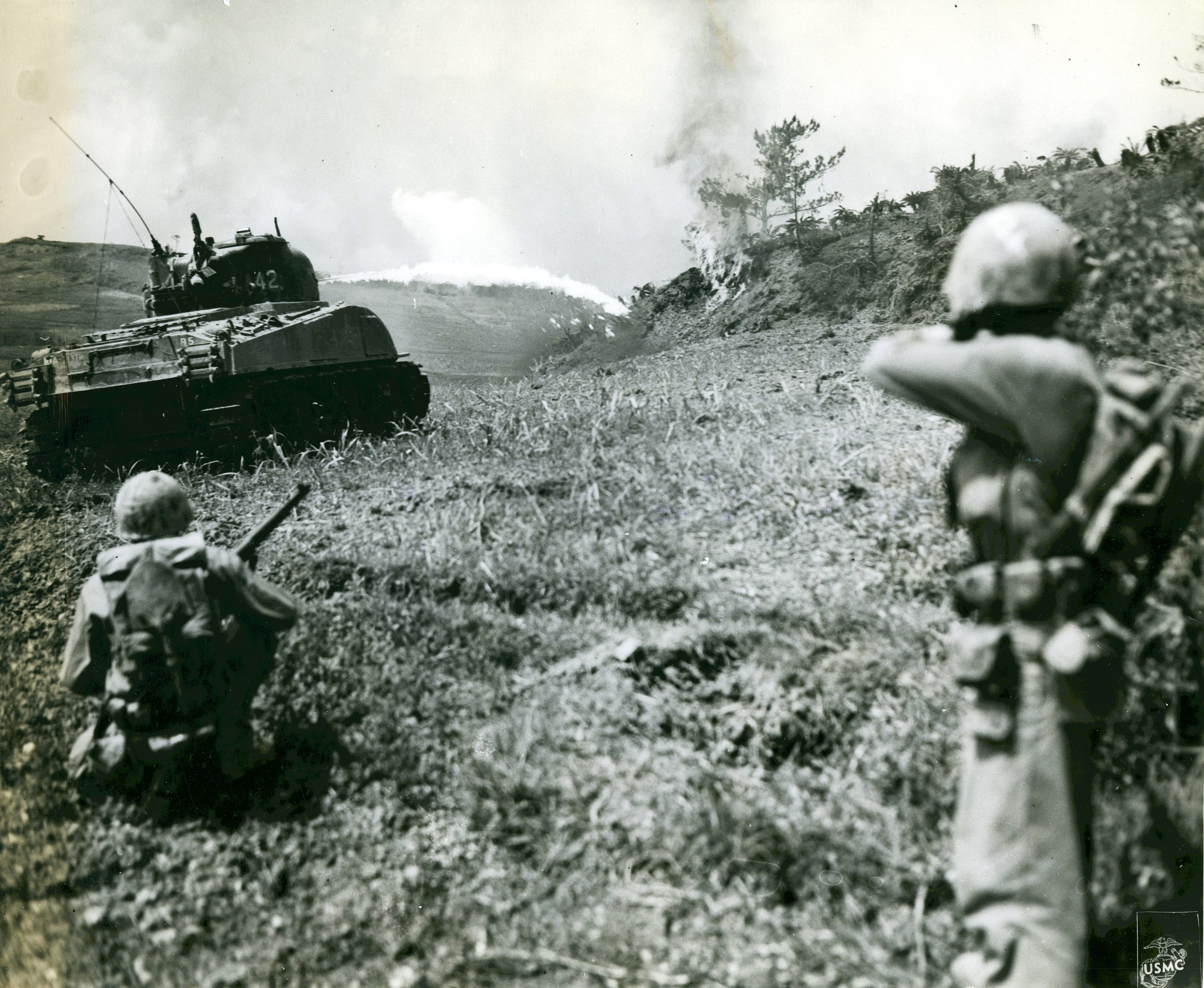
Marine riflemen follow a flame-throwing tank on Okinawa, 11 May 1945

US Tenth Army
Lieutenant General Simon Bolivar Buckner Jr., USA (KIA 18 Jun)
Major General Roy S. Geiger, USMC (18 Jun thru 23 Jun)
General Joseph W. Stilwell, USA (from 23 Jun)

=== Northern Landing Area ===
III Amphibious Corps
Major General Roy S. Geiger

Chief of Staff: Brigadier General Merwin H. Silverthorn
Chief of Corps Artillery: Brigadier General David R. Nimmer

Embarked in Task Force 53 under Rear Admiral Lawrence F. Reifsnider

==== Left Beaches ====
6th Marine Division
Major General Lemuel C. Shepherd Jr. (Note: Served as Commandant of the Marine Corps, 1952-55)

Asst. Div. Cmdr.: Brigadier General William T. Clement
Chief of Staff: Colonel John C. McQueen
G-1 (Personnel): Major Addison B. Overstreet
G-2 (Intelligence): Lt. Colonel Thomas B. Williams
G-3 (Operations): Lt. Colonel Victor H. Krulak
G-4 (Logistics): Lt. Colonel August Larson (to 16 May), Lt. Colonel Wayne H. Adams

Left zone – Green beaches

22nd Marine Regiment
Colonel Merlin F. Schneider (to 16 May), Colonel Harold C. Roberts (KIA 18 Jun), Lt. Col. August Larson
Exec. Ofc.: Colonel Karl K. Louther (to 16 May), Lt. Col. August Larson (to 17 Jun), Lt. Col. John B. Baker (to 20 Jun), Lt. Col. Samuel R. Shaw

1st Battalion (Major Thomas J. Myers (KIA 15 May), Major Earl J. Cook (WIA 17 Jun), Lt. Col. Gavin C. Humphrey)

CMoH recipients: Navy Corpsman Fred F. Lester (KIA 8 Jun)

2nd Battalion (Lt. Col. Horatio C. Woodhouse Jr. (KIA 30 May), Lt. Col. John G. Johnson)

CMoH recipients: Major Henry A. Courtney Jr. (KIA 15 May), Cpl. James L. Day

3rd Battalion Lt. Col. Malcolm "O" Donohoo (WIA 16 May), Major George B. Kantner (to 19 May), Lt. Col. Clair W. Shisler)

Right zone – Red beaches

4th Marine Regiment
Colonel Alan Shapley
Exec. Ofc.: Lt. Col. Fred D. Beans (to 14 Apr), Lt. Col. Fred D. Beans (from 1 May)

1st Battalion (Major Bernard W. Green, Lt. Col. Fred D. Beans, Lt. Col. George B. Bell)

CMoH recipient: Cpl. Richard Earl Bush

2nd Battalion (Lt. Col. Reynolds H. Hayden (to 26 May), Major Edgar F. Carney Jr.)
3rd Battalion (Lt. Col. Bruno A. Hochmuth)

Reserve – Landed D-Day

29th Marine Regiment (Note: William Manchester, later a noted historian, served in this unit on Okinawa; his 1980 bestseller Goodbye Darkness: A Memoir of the Pacific War was later discovered to contain multiple exaggerations and falsehoods.)
Colonel Victor F. Bleasdale (to 14 Apr), Colonel William J. Whaling
Exec. Ofc.: Lt. Col. Orin K. Pressley

1st Battalion (Lt. Col. Jean W. Moreau (WIA 16 May), Maj. Robert P. Neuffer (to 25 May), Lt. Col. Samuel S. Yeaton (to 14 Jun), Lt. Col. Leroy P. Hunt Jr.)
2nd Battalion (Lt. Col. William G. Robb (WIA 19 Apr))
3rd Battalion (Lt. Col. Erma A. Wright (To 14 Jun), Lt. Col. Angus N. FraServ)

CMoH recipient: Pvt. Robert M. McTureous Jr. (KIA 7 Jun)

Artillery

15th Marine Regiment (Artillery)
Colonel Robert B. Luckey
Exec. Ofc.: Lt. Col. James H. Brower

1st Battalion (Major Robert H. Armstrong)
2nd Battalion (Major Nat M. Pace)
3rd Battalion (Lt. Col. Joe C. McHaney)
4th Battalion (Lt. Col. Bruce T. Henphill)

CMoH recipient: PFC Harold Gonsalves (KIA 15 Apr)

Service troops

6th Engineer Battalion (Maj. Paul F. Sackett)
6th Medical Battalion (Cmdr. John S. Cowan, USN)
6th Motor Transport Battalion (Lt. Col. Ernest H. Gould)
6th Pioneer Battalion (Lt. Col. Samuel R. Shaw (to 10 May), Maj. John G. Dibble (to 8 Jun), Lt. Col. Samuel R. Shaw (to 18 Jun), Maj. John G. Dibble)
6th Service Battalion (Lt. Col. George B. Bell (to 25 Apr), Lt. Col. Alexander N. Entringer)
6th Tank Battalion (Lt. Col. Robert L. Denig Jr.)

Attached units

1st Armored Amphibian Battalion
4th Amphibian Tractor Battalion
9th Amphibian Tractor Battalion
58th Naval Construction Battalion
6th Joint Assault Signal Company

==== Right Beaches ====
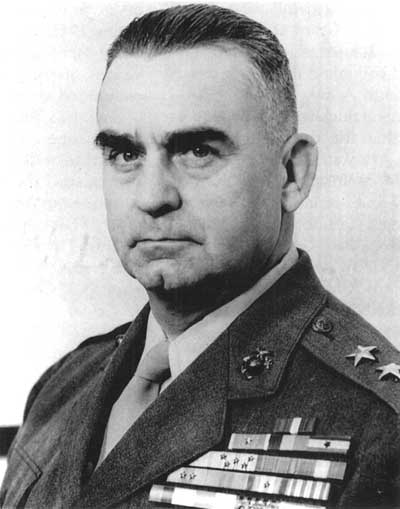
Maj. Gen. Pedro A. del Valle

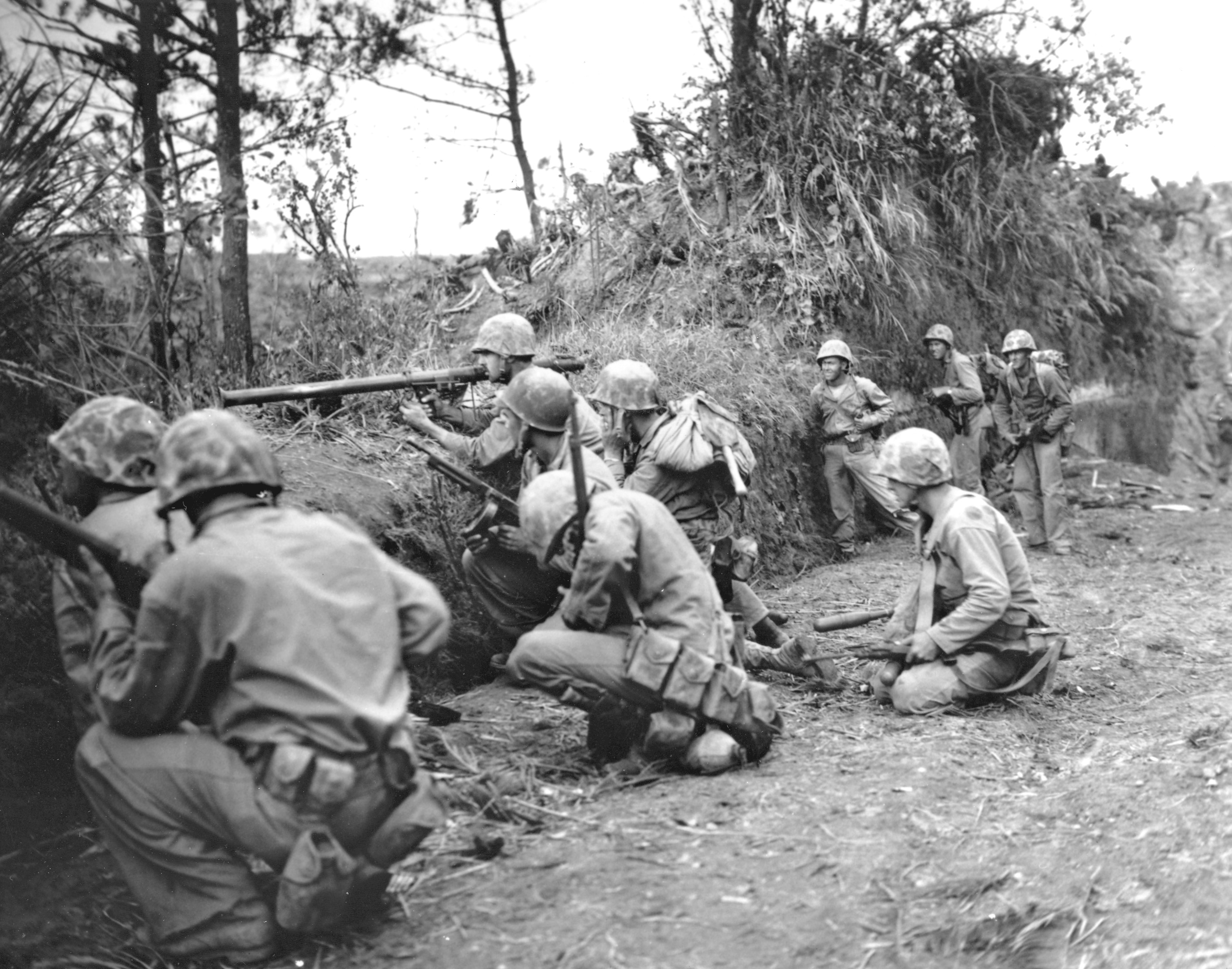
Men of the 1st Marine Division assault a ridge two miles north of Naha supported by a bazooka.

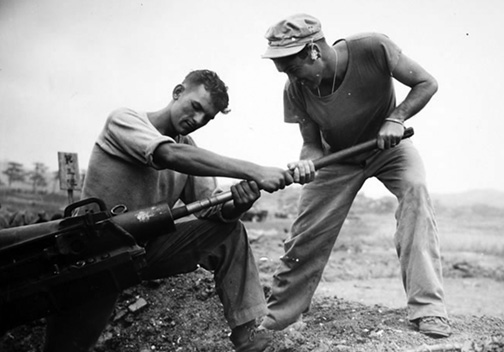
Artillerymen of the 1st Battalion, 11th Marines swabbing the barrel of their 75mm pack howitzer during the Okinawa campaign.

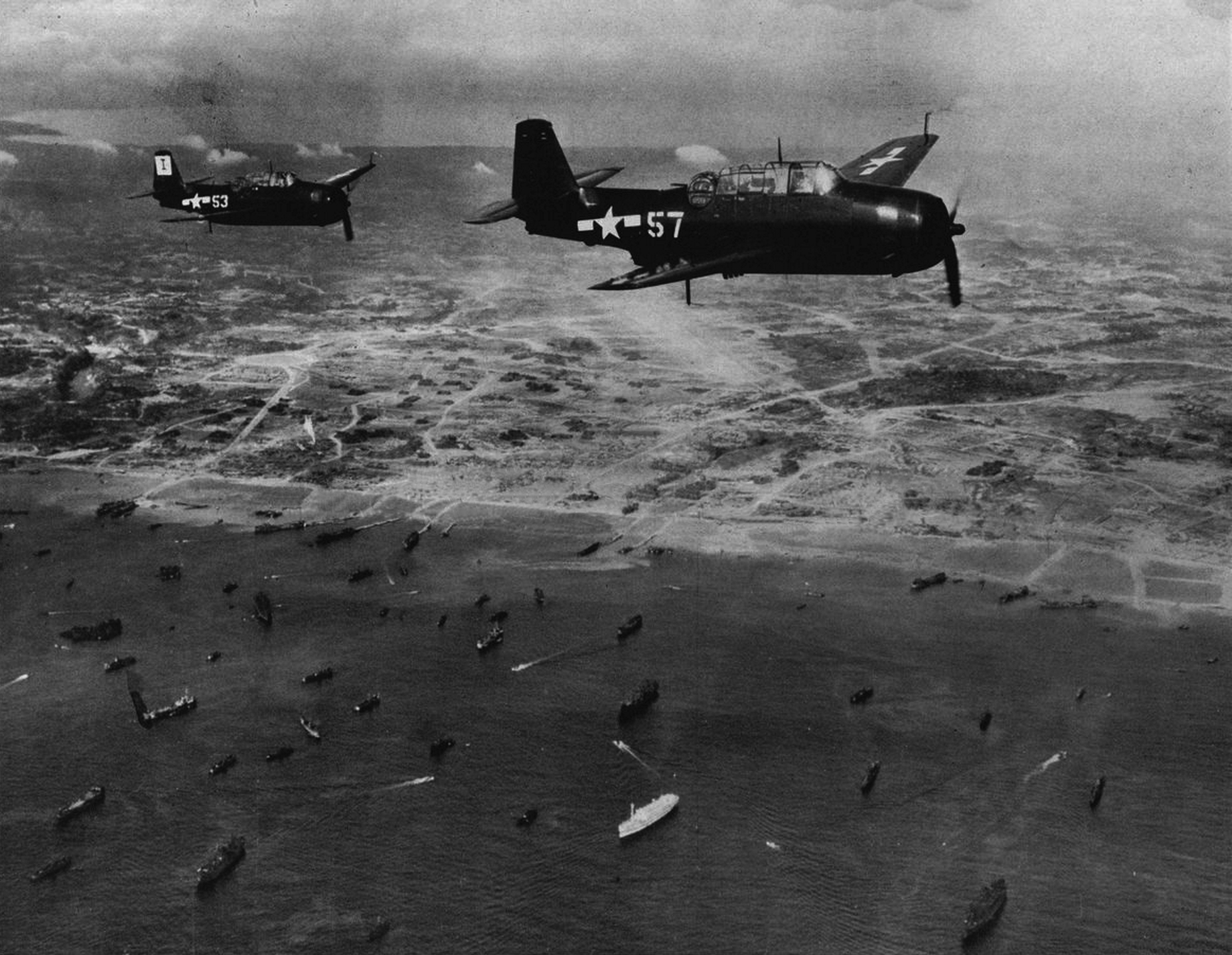
Marine Corps TBM Avengers over Okinawa; white-pained hospital ship is visible below

1st Marine Division
Major General Pedro A. del Valle

Asst. Div. Cmdr.: Brigadier General Louis R. Jones
Chief of Staff: Colonel Robert O. Bare
G-1 (Personnel): Major Harold O. Deakin
G-2 (Intelligence): Lt. Colonel John W. Scott Jr.
G-3 (Operations): Lt. Colonel Russell E. Honsowetz
G-4 (Logistics): Lt. Colonel Harvey C. Tschirgi

Left zone – Blue beaches

7th Marine Regiment
Colonel Edward W. Snedeker
Exec. Ofc.: Lt. Col. James M. Masters Sr.

1st Battalion (Lt. Col. John L. Gormley)
2nd Battalion (Lt. Col. Spencer S. Berger)
3rd Battalion (Lt. Col. Edward H. Hurst (WIA 19 Jun), Lt. Col. Stephen V. Sabol)

Right zone – Yellow beaches

5th Marine Regiment (Note: Eugene B. Sledge, author of the noted memoir With the Old Breed: At Peleliu and Okinawa, served in Company K / 3rd Battalion.)
Colonel John H. Griebel
Exec. Ofc.: Lt. Col. John D. Muncie

1st Battalion (Lt. Col. Charles W. Shelburne)

CMoH recipient: PFC Albert E. Schwab (KIA 7 May)

2nd Battalion (Lt. Col. William B. Benedict (to 20 Jun), Major Richard T. Washburn)

CMoH recipients: Navy Corpsman Robert Eugene Bush, Navy Corpsman William D. Halyburton Jr. (KIA 10 May)

3rd Battalion (Major John H. Gustafson (WIA 1 Apr), Lt. Col. John C. Miller, Jr. (4 Apr to 16 May), Major Frank W. Poland (to 8 Jun), Jr., Lt. Col. Robert B. Hill)

Reserve

1st Marine Regiment
Colonel Kenneth B. Chappell (to 5 May), Colonel Arthur T. Mason
Exec. Ofc.: Lt. Col. Richard P. Ross, Jr. (to 20 May), Lt. Col. James S. Monahan

1st Battalion (Lt. Col. James C. Murray, Jr. (WIA 9 May), Lt. Col. Richard P. Ross, Jr. (to 12 May), Lt. Col. Austin C. Shofner (Note: Captured on Corregidor, Shofner took part in the only successful escape from a Japanese POW camp.))

CMoH recipients: Cpl. John P. Fardy (KIA 7 May), Cpl. Louis J. Hauge Jr. (KIA 14 May)

2nd Battalion (Lt. Col. James C. Magee, Jr.)

CMoH recipient: Pvt. Dale M. Hansen (KIA 7 May)

3rd Battalion (Lt. Col. Stephen V. Sabol (to 20 May), Lt. Col. Richard P. Ross Jr.)

CMoH recipients: PFC William A. Foster (KIA 2 May), Sgt. Elbert L. Kinser (KIA 4 May)

Artillery

11th Marine Regiment (Artillery)
Colonel Wilburt S. Brown
Exec. Ofc.: Lt. Col. Edson L. Lyman

1st Battalion (Lt. Col. Richard W. Wallace)
2nd Battalion (Lt. Col. James H. Mofatt Jr.)
3rd Battalion (Lt. Col. Thomas G. Roe)
4th Battalion (Lt. Col. Leonard F. Chapman Jr.)

Service troops

1st Engineer Battalion (Major Theodore E. Drummond)
1st Medical Battalion (Lt. Cmdr. Francis Giuffrida, USN))
1st Motor Transport Battalion (Lt. Col. Marion A. Fawcett (to 15 Apr), Lt. Col. Calvin C. Gaines)
1st Pioneer Battalion (Lt. Col. Robert G. Ballance)
1st Service Battalion (Lt. Col. Calvin C. Gaines (to 17 Apr), Col. John Kaluf)
1st Tank Battalion (Lt. Col. Arthur J. Stuart (WIA 13 Jun))

Attached units

3rd Armored Amphibian Battalion, Provisional (Lt. Col. John L. Williamson, Jr. (to 7 May), Major Arthur M. Parker, Jr.)
1st Amphibian Tractor Battalion (Lt. Col. Maynard M. Nohrden)
8th Amphibian Tractor Battalion (Lt. Col. Chalres B. Nerren (to 13 Apr), Major Bedford Williams (to 17 Apr), Lt. Col. Chalres B. Nerren)
145th Naval Construction Battalion
4th Joint Assault Signal Company

1st Provisional Antiaircraft Artillery Group

Colonel Kenneth W. Benner

=== Southern Landing Area ===
XXIV Army Corps
Major General John R. Hodge

Embarked in Task Force 55 under Rear Admiral John L. Hall

==== Left Beaches ====
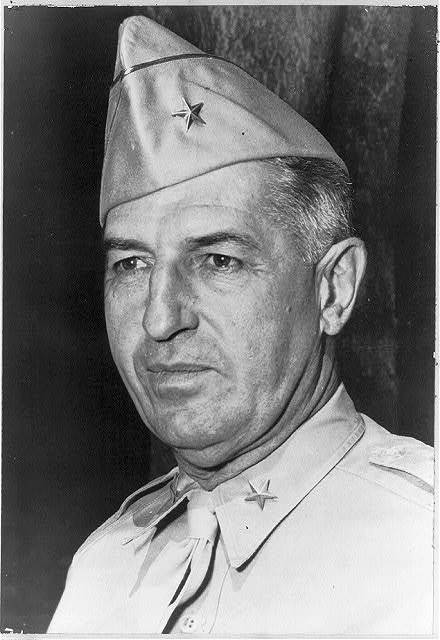
Archibald V. Arnold as a brigadier general

7th Infantry ("Bayonet") Division
Major General Archibald V. Arnold

Infantry

17th Infantry Regiment – Purple Beaches
32nd Infantry Regiment – Orange Beaches
184th Infantry Regiment – Reserve

Artillery

48th, 49th, 57th Field Artillery Battalions (105mm)
31st Field Artillery Battalion (155mm)

Division troops

7th Reconnaissance Troop (Mechanized)
13th Engineer Combat Battalion
7th Medical Battalion
7th Counter Intel Corps Det

==== Right Beaches ====
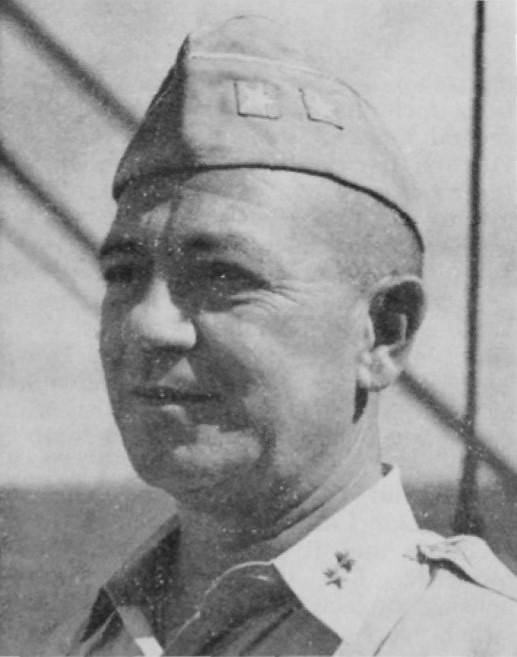
Maj. Gen. James L. Bradley

96th Infantry ("Deadeye") Division
Major General James L. Bradley

Infantry

381st Infantry Regiment – White Beaches

CMoH recipient: Sgt. Beauford T. Anderson

382nd Infantry Regiment – Reserve

CMoH recipients: PFC Clarence B. Craft, Lt. Seymour W. Terry

383rd Infantry Regiment – Brown Beaches

CMoH recipient: PFC Edward J. Moskala (KIA 9 Apr)

Artillery

361st, 362nd, 921st Field Artillery Battalions (105mm)
363rd Field Artillery Battalion (155mm)

Division troops

96th Reconnaissance Troop (Mechanized)
321st Engineer Combat Battalion
321st Medical Battalion
96th Counter Intel Corps Det

Medium tanks of the 713th Tank Battalion during a respite in the fighting on Okinawa.

==== Reserve – Landed L+8 ====
27th Infantry ("New York") Division
Major General George W. Griner Jr.

Infantry

105th Infantry Regiment
106th Infantry Regiment
165th Infantry Regiment

CMoH recipient: Sgt. Alejandro R. Ruiz

Artillery

104th, 105th, 249th Field Artillery Battalions (105mm)
106th Field Artillery Battalion (155mm)

Division troops

27th Reconnaissance Troop (Mechanized)
102nd Engineer Combat Battalion
102nd Medical Battalion
27th Counter Intel Corps Det

=== Western Islands (Ie Shima, etc.) ===
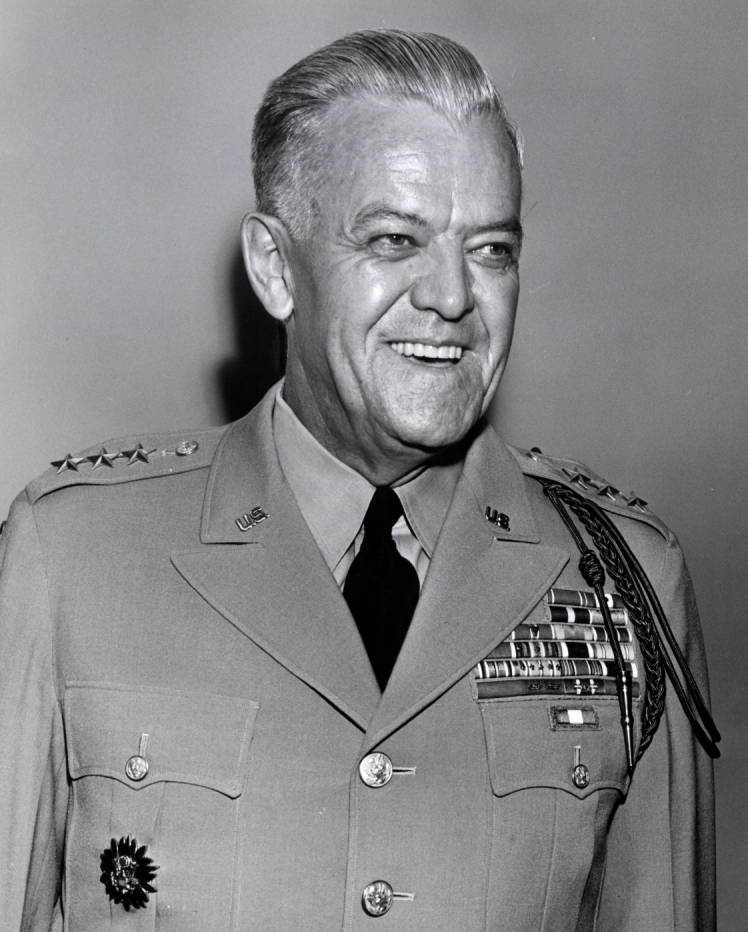
Andrew D. Bruce as a lieutenant general

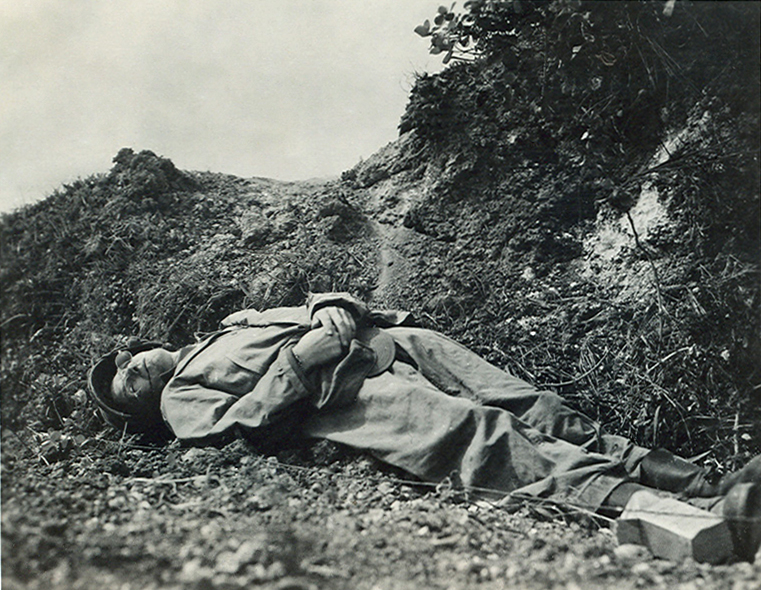
Renowned combat journalist Ernie Pyle shortly after being killed on Ie Shima.

77th Infantry ("Statue of Liberty") Division
Major General Andrew D. Bruce

Embarked in Task Group 51.1 under Rear Admiral Ingolf N. Kiland

Infantry

305th Infantry Regiment – landed 17 Apr Red Beaches 1 & 2

CMoH recipients: Sgt. John W. Meagher, Sgt. Joseph E. Muller (KIA 16 May)

306th Infantry Regiment – landed 17 Apr Green Beach
307th Infantry Regiment – landed 17 Apr Red Beaches 3 & 4

CMoH recipients: Cpl. Desmond Doss, PFC Martin O. May (KIA 21 Apr)

One Marine BLT

Artillery

304th, 305th, 902nd Field Artillery Battalions (105mm)
306th Field Artillery Battalion (155mm)

Division troops

77th Reconnaissance Troop (Mechanized)
302nd Engineer Combat Battalion
302nd Medical Battalion
77th Counter Intel Corps Det

=== Air Forces ===
Tactical Air Force, Tenth Army

Major General Francis P. Mulcahy, USMC (to 11 Jun) (Note: Relieved for ill health)
Major General Louis E. Woods, USMC (from 11 Jun)

== Japanese forces ==
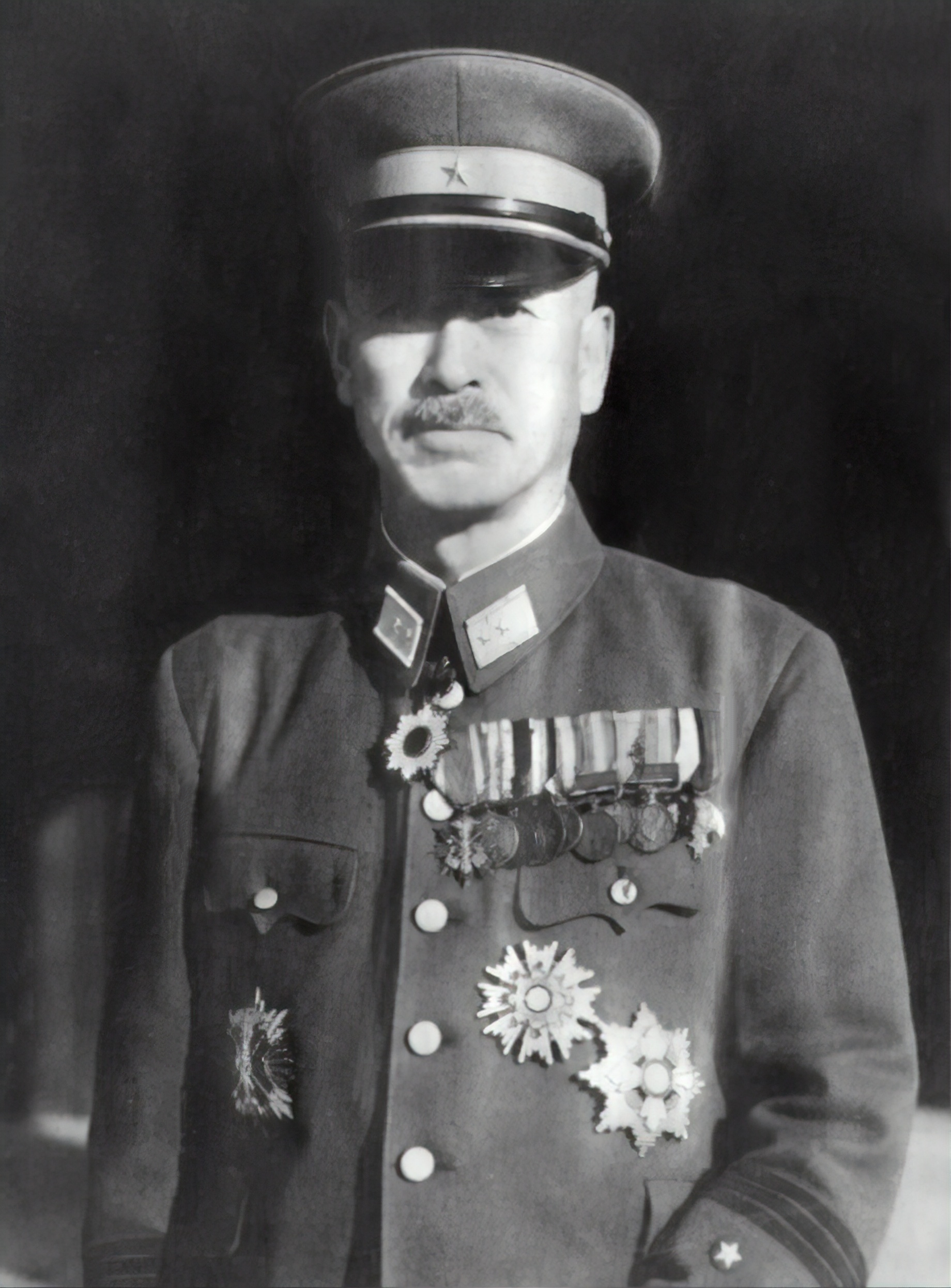
Lt. Gen. Mitsuru Ushijima

=== Thirty-Second Army ===
Source: Note: (Note: A Japanese army was equivalent to a Euro-American corps.)

Lieutenant General Mitsuru Ushijima (seppuku 22 Jun)
Approx. 67,000 men under arms, incl. 5,000 Okinawan conscripts

24th Division
Lt. Gen. Tatsumi Amamiya (KIA 30 Jun)

22nd Infantry Regiment
32nd Infantry Regiment
89th Infantry Regiment

62nd Division
Lt. Gen. Takeo Fujioka (suicide 22 Jun)

63rd Brigade
67th Brigade

44th Independent Mixed Brigade
Maj. Gen. Suzuki Shigeji (died 22 Jun)

== Bibliography ==
- Clark, George C. (2006). The Six Marine Divisions in the Pacific: Every Campaign of World War II. Jefferson, North Carolina: McFarland & Company. ISBN 0-7864-2769-8.
- Frank, Benis M. (1969). Okinawa: Touchstone to Victory. London: McDonald & Company. ISBN 0-3560-3066-0.
- Rottman, Gordon (2004). Okinawa 1945: The Last Battle. Oxford: Osprey. ISBN 0-275-98274-2.
- Stanton, Shelby L. (1984). World War II Order of Battle. New York: Galahad Books. ISBN 0-88365-775-9.
