= Mitsuru Ushijima =

Japanese general (1887–1945)

- 牛島 満
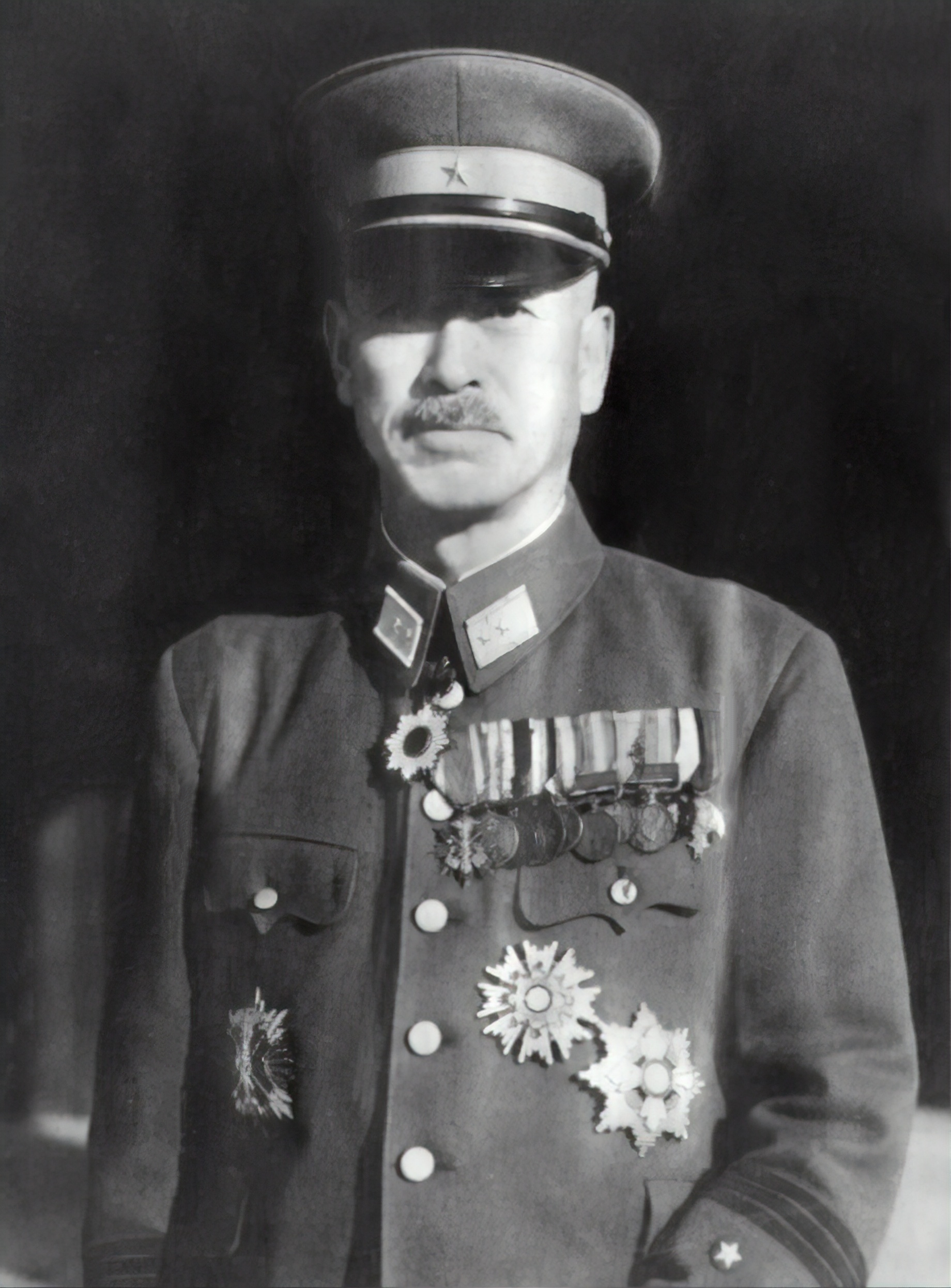
- Ushijima c. 1944
- Born: July 31, 1887; Kagoshima, Kagoshima, Japan
- Died: June 22, 1945 (aged 57); Itoman, Okinawa, Japan
- Military career
- Allegiance: Empire of Japan
- Branch: Imperial Japanese Army
- Service years: 1908 – 1945
- Rank: General
- Commands: 11th Division; Thirty-Second Army
- Conflicts: Siberian Intervention; Second Sino-Japanese War; World War II; Pacific War; Volcano and Ryukyu Islands campaign; Battle of Okinawa ‡‡
- Awards: Order of the Sacred Treasure; Order of the Golden Kite (2nd class)

Mitsuru Ushijima (牛島 満, Ushijima Mitsuru; 31 July 1887 – 22 June 1945) was a Japanese general who served during the Second Sino-Japanese War and World War II. He was the commanding general of the 32nd Army, which fought in the Battle of Okinawa during the final stages of the war. Ushijima's troops were defeated, and at the end of the battle he committed suicide.

== Biography ==
=== Early career ===
Ushijima was born in Kagoshima city, where his father had been a samurai in the service of Satsuma Domain and later a career officer in the early Imperial Japanese Army. He was the fourth son, and one of his elder brothers served as governor of Ibaraki Prefecture. The family relocated to Tokyo, but when his father died shortly after Ushijima was born, his mother moved the family back to Kagoshima. He graduated from school with honors and decided to follow in his father's footsteps for a military career. Ushijima graduated from the 20th class of the Imperial Japanese Army Academy in 1908 with honors, and was noted for his mastery of the Jigen-ryū school of Japanese swordsmanship. He graduated from the 28th class of the Army Staff College in 1916, where his classmates included Tomoyuki Yamashita and Shizuichi Tanaka.

In August 1918, Ushijima was assigned to the staff of the Japanese Expeditionary Force based at Vladivostok during the Siberian Intervention against Bolshevik forces during the Russian Civil War, where his duty was to coordinate the dispatch of troops and to arrange transportation of supplies. He was promoted to captain later that year. On his return to Japan, he was awarded the Order of the Golden Kite, 5th class.

In April 1919, Ushijima served as commander of the 4th Guards Regiment and became an instructor at the Army Infantry School in August 1920. When he was promoted to major in 1924, he took command of the IJA 43rd Infantry Battalion. In April 1925, he was assigned to his alma mater, Daiichi Kagoshima Junior High School as part of an experiment conducted by the Minister of the Army, Kazunari Ugaki to provide basic military education to students at universities, junior high schools, and normal schools nationwide. Ushijima stayed in this position for three years.

In 1928, Ushijima was promoted to lieutenant colonel and commander of the IJA 23rd Infantry Regiment. In 1930, he became chief-of-staff of Shimonoseki Fortress, and in 1932 became commandant of the elite Army's Toyama School, and was promoted to colonel. Around this time, young officers were increasingly influenced by the ultra right-wing writings of Kita Ikki, often talked about politics, but Ushijima strongly instructed instructors and students to concentrate on military service and publicly denounced Kita Ikka.

From 1933 to 1936, Ushijima served in administrative postings within the Army Ministry. During this time, political factionalism within the army was at its worst and Ushijima strove to avoid association with any faction. At the time of the February 26 incident in 1936, he was away in China on a business trip, and returned only after the rebellion was suppressed. However, he was selected to command the disgraced IJA 1st Infantry Regiment, which was sent to northern Manchukuo as punishment for its role in the uprising.

=== World War II ===
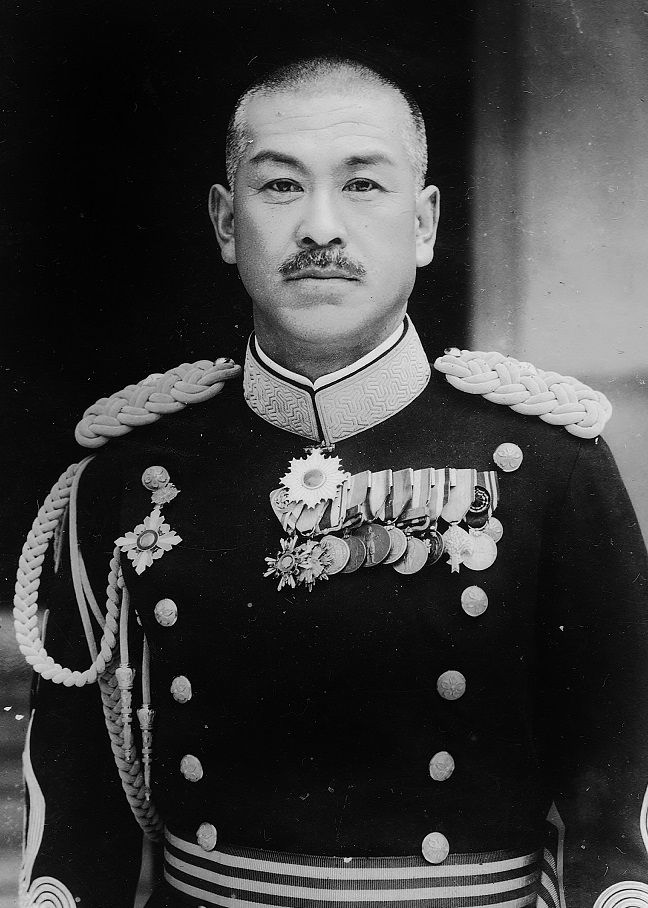
Ushijima as major general

With the start of the Second Sino-Japanese War, Ushijima was promoted to major general and appointed commander of the IJA 36th Infantry Brigade, which consisted of the Miyakonojō-based IJA 23rd Infantry Regiment and the Kagoshima-based IJA 45th Infantry Regiment. The 36th Brigade departed Kagoshima in early August 1937 and took up positions at the Shanhai Pass in northern China.

He was ordered by General Hisao Tani of the IJA 6th Division to advance and destroy the three divisions of Chiang Kai-shek's elite Chinese 14th Army, which were threatening Japanese positions near Badaling. Although greatly outnumbered, Ushijima fought a series of battles from August 30 through September 13, breaking through the Chinese lines, and reaching the outskirts of Shijiazhuang by October 14, albeit with heavy casualties. Ushijima was noted for leading from the front lines, regardless of the personal risk.

The IJA 36th Brigade then assisted in breaking the deadlock in Shanghai and captured a large number of Chinese soldiers and their weapons fleeing the city for Nanjing. In December, the brigade captured Wuhu, where it overwintered. From July 1938, the brigade participated in the Battle of Wuhan.

In March 1939, he was ordered back to Japan and was promoted to lieutenant general in August. In December, he was given command of the IJA 11th Division and assigned to garrison duty in Hulin, Manchukuo, on the Soviet border. Ushijima returned to Japan in October 1941 as Commandant of the Non-Commissioned Officers Academy.

The attack on Pearl Harbor in December 1941 caught Ushijima by surprise and he was vocal in his opposition to war with the United States, which he felt would only prolong the war in China and would weaken Japan against what he perceived to be Japan's true enemy, the Soviet Union. He was removed from his position in April 1942 for fear that he would influence his students and subordinates with ideas contrary to official government policy. However, Ushijima was reinstated instead as commandant of the Imperial Japanese Army Academy, largely at the recommendation of Kenji Doihara and Otozō Yamada, who shared his misgivings about the Pacific War. Ushijima felt that students at the Army Academy had become arrogant and "drunk with a sense of victory" after the fall of Singapore, and warned his students that the abundant natural resources and industrial capacity of the United States should not be underestimated. Ushijima's warnings were prophetic.

Despite his stated desire to remain an educator, he was ordered to take command of the newly formed 120,000-strong 32nd Army, which was charged with the defense of the Ryukyu Islands against American invasion.

His predecessor, Masao Watanabe, had begun to implement a plan to evacuate the civilian population of Okinawa to mainland Japan or Taiwan. Ushijima's arrival with a large number of reinforcements made the evacuation more difficult as many civilians gained a false sense of security, while the Tsushima Maru incident—in which over 1600 civilians, many of them children, perished on an evacuation vessel sunk by an American submarine—caused a panic.

Ushijima managed to evacuate 80,000 people from Okinawa and about 30,000 people from the Yaeyama Islands prior to the American invasion. However, he was less successful in his efforts to evacuate the remainder of the civilian population to the largely uninhabited northern half of the island due to lack of food supplies, malaria, and the need to conscript many able-bodied civilians to assist in the construction of trenches, bunkers and other defensive works, including his command headquarters in a network of tunnels under Shuri Castle in Naha. Ushijima was promoted to full general on June 20.

Ushijima led a skillful defense of the island based on a defense-in-depth as planned by his chief of staff, Colonel Hiromichi Yahara; however, he was constantly undermined by insubordination by his second in command, General Isamu Cho, who was pursuing a more aggressive policy encouraged by the Army General Staff in Tokyo for mass attacks against the invading American forces. After an offensive action urged by Cho led to a near-massacre of the attacking Japanese troops by superior American firepower and the turning of the Shuri Line by the American forces, he led a successful withdrawal of his troops to the extreme south of the island. This defensive line lacked the carefully prepared underground defenses of the Shuri Line, and became a fragmented grouping of isolated defensive positions. Ushijima and Cho retreated to Hill 89 at the south coast. The command and control of the remnants of the 32nd Army rapidly deteriorated as communication with the last defensive positions was cut. Record numbers of Japanese prisoners surrendered; many were Okinawan volunteers or conscripts.

On the 11th of June, 1945, a plea to surrender from the American General Simon Bolivar Buckner Jr. was dropped on Japanese positions via leaflets. Ushijima refused.

=== Death ===
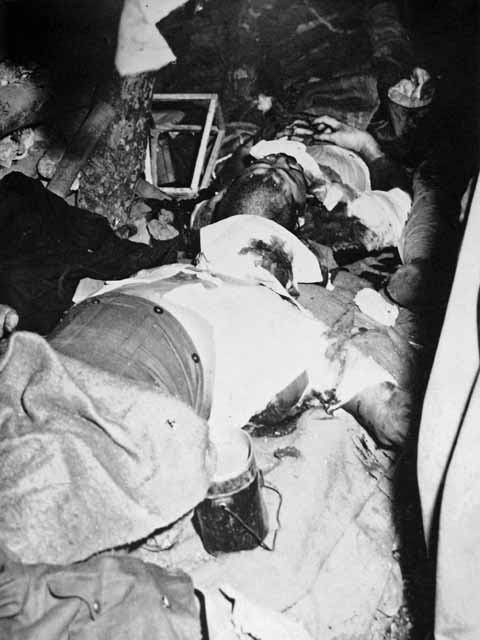
Ushijima and Cho's bodies following their suicides.

By the middle of June 1945 the 32nd Army was effectively reduced to occupying two strongpoints (one beneath Kunishi Ridge, the other being the command headquarters inside Hill 89). Realizing that the end of the battle was fast approaching Ushijima pledged in a farewell message to the Imperial headquarters that he would direct a final last stand “in which I will apologize to the emperor with my own death.” On the 18th of June, he directed his troops to make their way through enemy lines in small groups and join guerrilla groups in northern Okinawa. He then followed it with his final order:

“My beloved Soldiers;

You have fought courageously for nearly three months. You have discharged your duty. Your bravery and loyalty brighten the future.

The battlefield is now in such chaos that all communications have ceased. It is impossible for me to command you. Every man in these fortifications will follow his superior officer’s order and fight to the end for the sake of the motherland.

This is my final order.

Farewell”

General Cho added a postscript on the order, in red ink ”Do not suffer the shame of being taken prisoner. You will live for eternity.”

Ushijima and Cho had decided to commit seppuku (ritual suicide) and on the night of their planned departure held a banquet in the cave housing the command post with a large meal prepared by Ushijima's cook, Tetsuo Nakamuta, which was complemented with plenty of sake and Cho's remaining stock of captured Black & White Scotch whisky.

In the early hours of 22 June the staff in the command post lined up to pay their respects to Ushijima who was attired in his full dress uniform and Cho who wore a white kimono. Cho volunteered to go first and lead the way, "as the way may be dark,” but Ushijima insisted on going first. The men made their way onto an outside ledge overlooking the ocean, on which a white cloth had been laid over a quilt. Handed a knife by an aide, Ushijima shouted and made a deep vertical cut in his bared abdomen before Captain Sakaguchi (who was regarded as a master swordsman) decapitated him with his sword. Cho followed Ushijima and the bodies of both men were buried by three orderlies in shallow graves.

Their deaths were witnessed by Yahara, who was the most senior officer captured by American forces. Yahara had asked Ushijima for permission to commit suicide, but the general refused his request, saying, "If you die there will be no one left who knows the truth about the battle of Okinawa. Bear the temporary shame but endure it. This is an order from your army commander." Yahara later authored a book entitled The Battle for Okinawa, describing Ushijima's last moments.

The bodies of Ushijima and Cho were buried under U.S. military auspices near the cave where they died in the last hours of fighting on Okinawa on the 27th of June 1945: "The bodies of the two Japanese generals were lowered into graves almost above their cave headquarters which was sealed during the American flag service."

Ushijima was described as a humane man who discouraged his senior officers from striking his subordinates and who disliked displays of anger because he considered it a base emotion. American historian Hanson W. Baldwin regarded Ushijima as the greatest Japanese general of the Pacific War.

== Decorations ==
- Grand Cordon of the Order of the Sacred Treasure (1940)
- Order of the Golden Kite, 2nd class (1940)
- Grand Cordon of the Order of the Rising Sun (1944)

== Bibliography ==
- Dupuy, Trevor N. (1992). Encyclopedia of Military Biography. I B Tauris & Co Ltd. ISBN 1-85043-569-3.
- Fukagawa, Hideki (1981). (陸海軍将官人事総覧 (陸軍篇)) Army and Navy General Personnel Directory (Army). Tokyo: Fuyo Shobo. ISBN 4829500026.
- Fuller, Richard (1992). Shokan: Hirohito's Samurai. London: Arms and Armor. ISBN 1-85409-151-4.
- Hata, Ikuhiko (2005). (日本陸海軍総合事典) Japanese Army and Navy General Encyclopedia. Tokyo: St. Martin's Press. ISBN 4130301357.
- Hayashi, Saburo; Cox, Alvin (1959). Kogun: The Japanese Army in the Pacific War. Quantico, VA: The Marine Corps Association.
