= Fayetteville National Cemetery =

Historic veterans cemetery in Washington County, Arkansas

- U.S. National Register of Historic Places
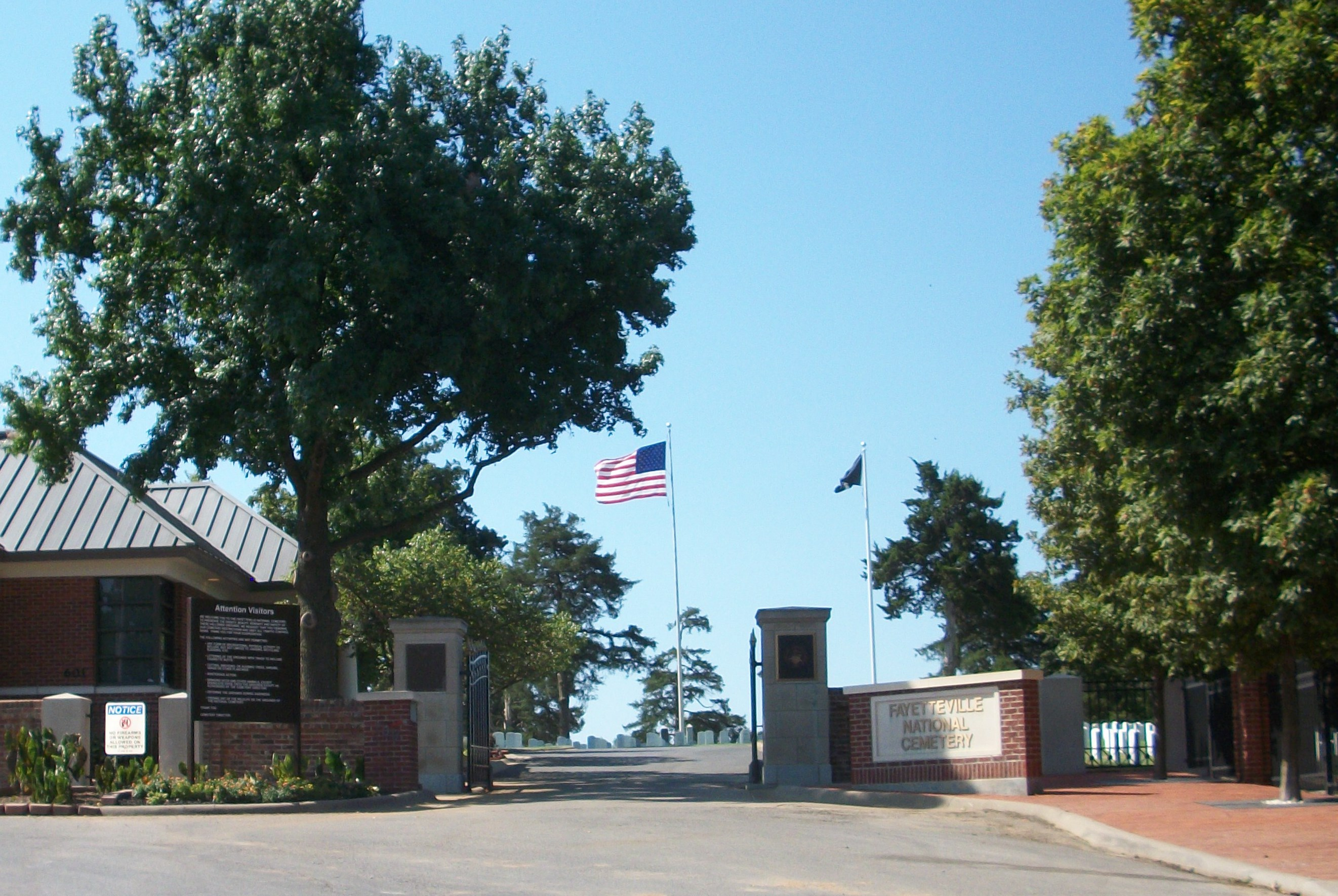
- Cemetery entrance on S. LtCol Leroy Pond Avenue

- Location within Arkansas Location within the United States
- Location: 1000 S. LtCol Leroy Pond Ave., Fayetteville, Arkansas
- Coordinates: 36°03′10″N 94°10′07″W
- Area: 11.6 acres (4.7 ha)
- Built: 1867
- MPS: Civil War Era National Cemeteries MPS
- NRHP reference No.: 99000892
- Added to NRHP: July 28, 1999

Fayetteville National Cemetery is a United States National Cemetery located on the southern side of the city of Fayetteville in Washington County, Arkansas. It encompasses nearly 15 acres (6.1 ha). As of 2020, over 11,000 veterans and family members were interred in this location, with approximately 200 new burials per year.

== History ==
The original plot of 6 acres (2.4 ha) of land for the National Cemetery was purchased in 1867 from Judge David Walker and Stephen Stone, names also associated with the historic Walker-Stone House in Fayetteville. The original layout was of an outer circle surrounding a six-pointed star with diamonds between the points of the star and a flagpole in the center. There were eighteen sections with an estimated capacity of 1,800 graves. The first interments were remains moved from battlefield cemeteries of the Battle of Prairie Grove and the Battle of Pea Ridge. By 1871 there were 1,200 interments made in the cemetery, most of which were unidentified.

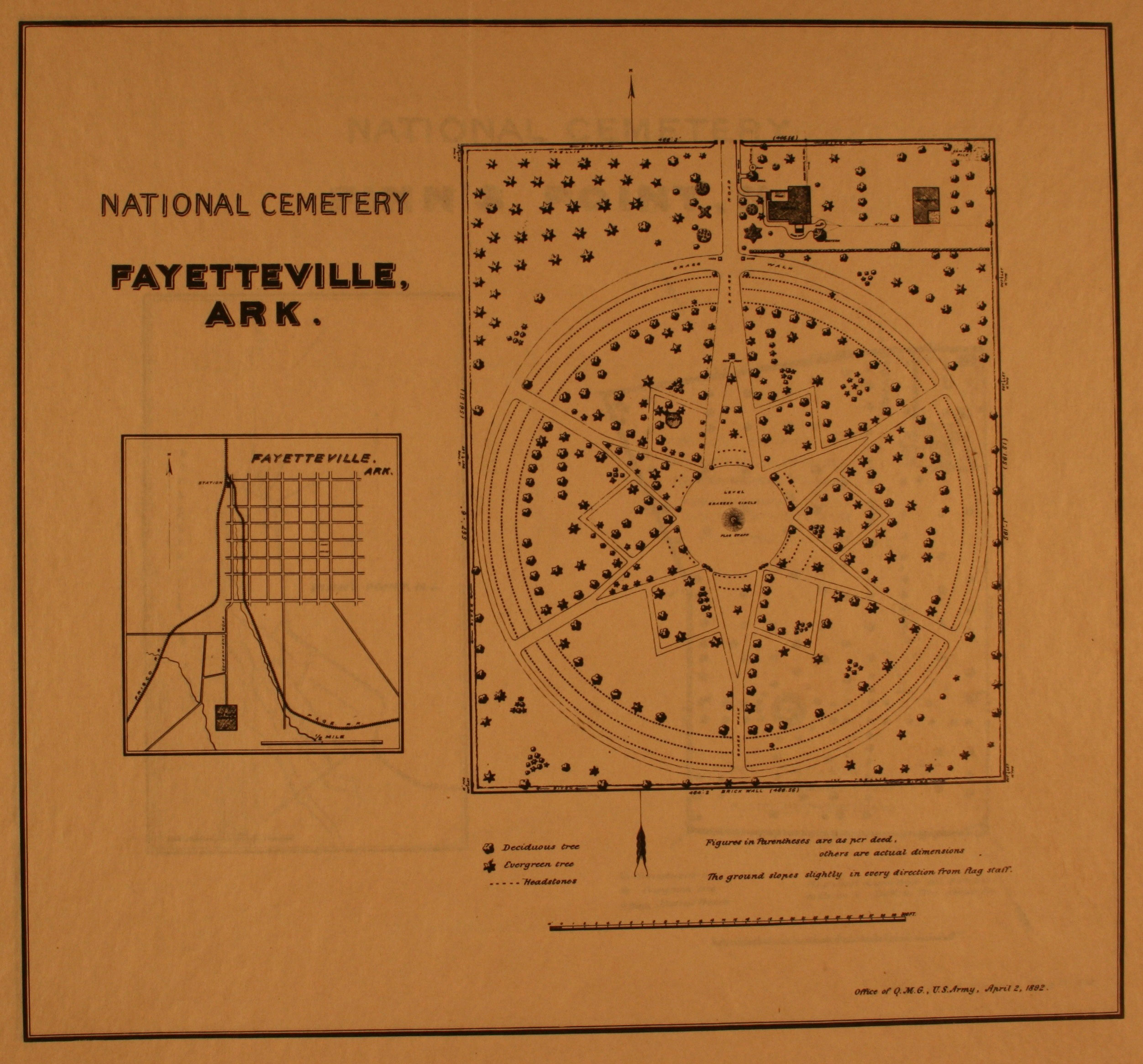
Layout of Fayetteville National Cemetery – 1892

During World War II the cemetery was enlarged, the layout was revised, and five more sections were added.

In 1989, the Regional National Cemetery Improvement Corporation (RNCIC – a group of locals, veterans, and other concerned benefactors) raised enough money to purchase an additional 3 acres (1.2 ha) of land, and donated it to the cemetery. The group continued their efforts over the years and donated numerous plots of land. In their latest and largest donation they donated 2.3 acres in ceremonies at the National Cemetery on November 9, 2013.

Fayetteville National Cemetery was placed on the National Register of Historic Places on July 28, 1999.

== Notable monuments ==
- The Revolutionary War Soldier Memorial, erected in the early 1990s.
- The Purple Heart Memorial, erected in 2000 to honor Purple Heart recipients.

== Notable interments ==
- Clarence B. Craft (1921–2002), Medal of Honor recipient for action at Hen Hill, Okinawa in 1945
- Vance Randolph (1892–1980), noted Ozarks folklorist and author

== See also ==
- National Register of Historic Places listings in Washington County, Arkansas
- List of cemeteries in Arkansas
