= Hiromichi Yahara =

Japanese army colonel (1902 – 1981)

- 八原博通
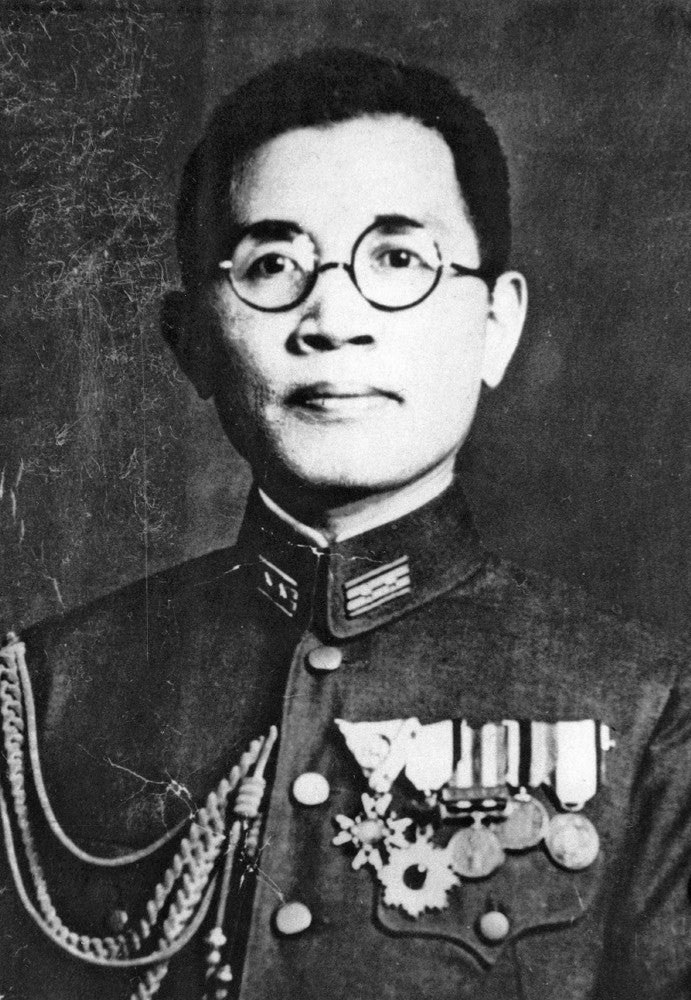
- Born: October 12, 1902; Tottori Prefecture, Japan
- Died: May 7, 1981 (aged 78); Japan
- Military career
- Allegiance: Empire of Japan
- Branch: Imperial Japanese Army
- Service years: 1923–1945
- Rank: Colonel
- Commands: Instructor of strategy; Army War College
- Conflicts: World War II; Battle of Okinawa (POW)

Hiromichi Yahara (Japanese: 八原博通; October 12, 1902 – May 7, 1981) was the senior staff officer in charge of operations for the 32nd Imperial Japanese Army during the Battle of Okinawa in World War II.

== Defense of Okinawa ==
Yahara, who had taught strategy at the Army War College, was assigned to Okinawa prior to the anticipated American invasion to organize its pre-invasion strategy. His recommended strategy for fighting the American invaders was to continue to tie up the American military as long as possible in a war of attrition (jikyūsen, 持久戦), so that the rumored American invasion of Kyūshū, Japan, would be delayed, thereby allowing Kyushu defenders more time to better prepare their defenses.

Once the Okinawa invasion started, Yahara recommended holding back Japanese forces for as long as possible and using them primarily in a defensive posture, rather than an aggressive one. However, Chief of Staff of the Army, Lieutenant General Isamu Cho, soon became frustrated by the relative inaction of the battlefield, and recommended banzai charges at the Americans.

Yahara disagreed with this recommendation, but went along with it. But when it was clear that Cho's samurai-charge methods were not working, but, rather, causing huge numbers of casualties among the Japanese infantry, along with loss of territory, Cho relented and allowed Yahara to continue to make tactical and operational decisions.

Yahara's method, since he did not have the firepower to fight the Americans directly in battle and knew that he could not possibly win, was to fight from caves as long as possible and then, once the caves were lost, to "retreat and defend"—time after time—until there was no longer any room to retreat to.

== Escape and capture ==
When Lieutenant General Cho and Lieutenant General Mitsuru Ushijima decided to commit ritualistic suicide in Mabuni caves, Yahara requested permission to commit seppuku alongside them, but Ushijima refused, telling him "If you die there will be no one left who knows the truth about the battle of Okinawa. Bear the temporary shame but endure it. This is an order from your army commander." Cho instructed Yahara to make his way through the American lines to northern Okinawa and report to Tokyo on what had happened, and gave him 500 yen for the journey.

After the two generals had committed suicide, Yahara hid with several other staff officers in a small cave whose entrance they had blocked with stone and waited for the opportunity to escape. After hearing American troops drilling into the rock above them they relocated to another cave before deciding to split up. Disguising himself as a civilian, he made his way down Mahuni Hill and eventually joined two other soldiers, the three of them joining a large group of approximately 50 civilians sheltering in a cave. The group was discovered by the Americans who, following an air attack on the cave, convinced the group to surrender. Yahara led them out and was mistakenly judged to be a Japanese English teacher. He was taken to a holding camp before being taken to a house on Chinen Peninsula which he shared with 30 other civilian refugees. He later joined a work detail before eventually three weeks after his escape from the 32nd Army headquarters his true identity was discovered by the U.S. military. Now a prisoner of war with privileges due to his rank as having been the third highest ranked Japanese officer on the island, he was transferred to 10th Army headquarters where he was interrogated.

Following the end of the war Yahara was repatriated back home to Japan in January 1946.

== Literary contribution ==
After the war Yahara wrote his account of the battle. His Okinawa Kessen (Decisive Battle for Okinawa), first published in Japanese in 1973, was an account of his first-hand experience directing Japanese operations on Okinawa during the invasion.

He died in 1981.

== Yahara chronology ==
1902 – Born. Son of a small country landowner in Tottori Prefecture (Japan).

Won appointment to the Military Academy. 1923 – Graduated from Military Academy. Assigned to 54th Infantry Regiment.

1925 – Assigned to 63rd Infantry Regiment.

1926 – Entered Army War College.

1929 – Graduated from War College. Returned to the 63rd Regiment.

1930 – Assigned to Personnel Department of the War Ministry.

1933 – Sent to the United States as an exchange officer. Traveled Wilmington, Delaware, Boston, Massachusetts, Washington, D.C. Attached to the 8th Infantry Regiment for six months at Fort Moultrie.

1935 – Returned to Personnel Department, War Ministry.

1937 – Appointed as instructor (strategy and tactics) at the Army War College. Spent three months in China as staff officer with the 2nd Army (N. China Expeditionary Force).

1938 – Returned to Army War College as instructor.

1940 – September: assigned as Japanese agent to Siam, Burma, Malaya. November–December: reported to General Staff as expert on southeast Asia.

1941 – July: to Bangkok as Assistant Military Attaché. November 15: received secret orders to staff of 15th Army (Saigon). Remained at Bangkok and participated in the negotiations for the peaceful occupation of Siam. Then participated in the Burma operation with the 15th Army.

Became ill and returned to Japan. Again assigned to the War College as instructor.

1944 – 16 March: Assigned to Okinawa as advisor from Imperial Staff. 32nd Army Headquarters soon formed (March 22, 1944) and assigned as Senior Staff Officer.

1945 – July 15: captured by American military at the Yakibu Civilian Compound.

(Source: U.S. Tenth Army Interrogation Report #28, dated 6 August 1945.)

1981 – Died.

== See also ==
- Battle of Okinawa
- Isamu Cho
- Mitsuru Ushijima
