= Ova A. Kelley =

- Born: March 27, 1914; Norwood, Missouri, US
- Died: December 10, 1944 (aged 30); Leyte, Philippines
- Burial place: Oak Grove Cemetery, Norwood, Missouri
- Military career
- Allegiance: United States
- Branch: United States Army
- Service years: 1943–1944
- Rank: Private
- Units: 382nd Infantry Regiment, 96th Infantry Division
- Conflicts: World War II
- Awards: Medal of Honor

Ova Arthur Kelley (March 27, 1914 – December 10, 1944) was a United States Army soldier and a recipient of the United States military's highest decoration—the Medal of Honor—for his actions in World War II.

== Biography ==
Kelley joined the Army from San Francisco 15 October 1943, and by December 8, 1944, was serving as a private in Company A, 382nd Infantry Regiment, 96th Infantry Division. On that day, in Leyte, the Philippines, he single-handedly attacked an entrenched Japanese position and then led a charge which destroyed the remainder of the Japanese force. He was shot by a sniper soon after, and died of his wounds two days later. For these actions, he was posthumously awarded the Medal of Honor on October 19, 1945.

Kelley, aged 30 at his death, was buried at Oak Grove Cemetery north of his hometown of Norwood, Missouri.

== Medal of Honor citation ==
Private Kelley's official Medal of Honor citation reads:

For conspicuous gallantry and intrepidity at the risk of his life above and beyond the call of duty. Before dawn, near the edge of the enemy-held Buri airstrip, the company was immobilized by heavy, accurate rifle and machinegun fire from hostile troops entrenched in bomb craters and a ditch less than 100 yards distant. The company commander ordered a mortar concentration which destroyed 1 machinegun but failed to dislodge the main body of the enemy. At this critical moment Pvt. Kelley, on his own initiative, left his shallow foxhole with an armload of hand grenades and began a 1-man assault on the foe. Throwing his missiles with great accuracy, he moved forward, killed or wounded 5 men, and forced the remainder to flee in a disorganized route. He picked up a M-1 rifle and emptied its clip at the running Japanese, killing 3. Discarding this weapon, he took a carbine and killed 3 more of the enemy. Inspired by his example, his comrades followed him in a charge which destroyed the entire enemy force of 34 enlisted men and 2 officers and captured 2 heavy and 1 light machineguns. Pvt. Kelley continued to press the attack on to an airstrip, where sniper fire wounded him so grievously that he died 2 days later. His outstanding courage, aggressiveness, and initiative in the face of grave danger was an inspiration to his entire company and led to the success of the attack.

== Awards and decorations ==

Badge	Combat Infantryman Badge		
1st row	Medal of Honor		Bronze Star Medal
2nd row	Purple Heart	Army Good Conduct Medal	American Campaign Medal
3rd row	Asiatic-Pacific Campaign Medal with one campaign star	World War II Victory Medal	Philippine Liberation Medal

== See also ==
- List of Medal of Honor recipients
- List of Medal of Honor recipients for World War II
