= 382nd Infantry Regiment =

382nd Regiment
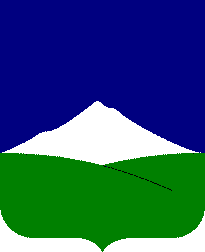
- Coat of arms
- Active: 1918; 1921–1952; 1999–present
- Country: United States
- Branch: Army
- Type: Infantry
- Role: Training
- Part of: 96th Infantry Division
- Engagements: Battle of Leyte, Battle of Okinawa
- Decorations: Presidential Unit Citation, Philippine Republic Presidential Unit Citation

Insignia
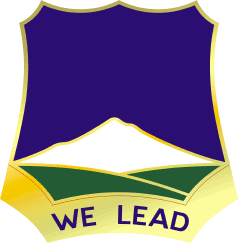
- Distinctive Unit Insignia

The 382nd Infantry Regiment is an infantry regiment in the United States Army. The unit served as a reserve regiment until it was called to active duty during World War II, whereupon it saw action in the Pacific theater as part of the 96th Infantry Division. The unit returned to reserve status after the war until being deactivated in 1952. The regiment was reactivated as a training unit in 1999.

== Service history ==
=== World War I ===
The 382nd Infantry Regiment was first constituted on 5 September 1918, in the National Army and assigned to the 96th Division. It was demobilized less than three months later after the armistice with Germany, on 30 November 1918.

=== Interwar period ===
Per the National Defense Act of 1920, the 382nd Infantry was reconstituted in the Organized Reserve on 24 June 1921, assigned to the 96th Division, and allotted to the Ninth Corps Area. It was initiated on 15 December 1921 with the regimental headquarters at Medford, Oregon. Subordinate battalion headquarters were concurrently organized as follows: 1st Battalion at Corvallis, Oregon; 2nd Battalion at Marshfield, Oregon; and 3rd Battalion at Salem, Oregon. The regimental headquarters was relocated 10 April 1923 to Salem. The entire regiment was relocated on 28 January 1930 to Medford. The regiment conducted summer training with battalions of the 4th Infantry Regiment at Fort Lewis, Washington, and with the 7th Infantry Regiment at Vancouver Barracks, Washington. It also conducted infantry Citizens' Military Training Camps some years at Vancouver Barracks as an alternate form of summer training. The primary ROTC "feeder" schools for new Reserve lieutenants for the regiment were the University of Oregon and Oregon State Agricultural College.

=== World War II ===
Ordered into active military service on 15 August 1942, the unit was reorganized at Camp Adair, Oregon, for service in World War II. As part of the 96th Infantry Division, the 382nd participated in the Battle of Leyte from October to December 1944 and the Battle of Okinawa from April to June 1945. The regiment returned to the U.S. and was inactivated on 3 February 1946, at Camp Anza, California.

=== Cold War to present ===
A year later, on 10 January 1947, the 382nd Infantry was reactivated in the Organized Reserve (redesignated the Army Reserve in 1952) with its headquarters at Boise, Idaho. It was inactivated again on 1 March 1952, and relieved from its assignment to the 96th Infantry Division. Redesignated on 17 October 1999, as the 382nd Regiment, the unit was reorganized to consist of the 1st, 2nd, and 3rd Battalions, elements of the 75th Division (Training Support).

== Awards and honors ==
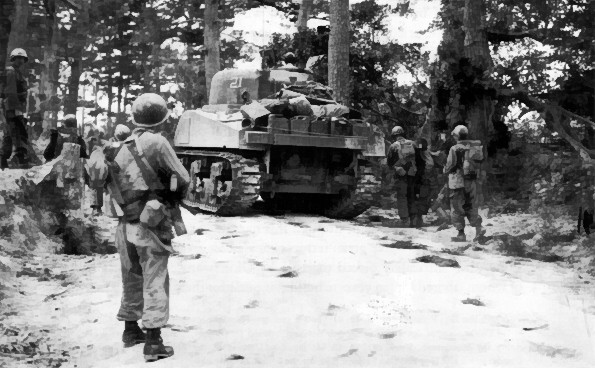
Men and armor of the 382nd Infantry move through a wooded area during the Battle of Okinawa

Unit decorations

- Presidential Unit Citation for Okinawa
- Philippine Republic Presidential Unit Citation for 17 October 1944 to 4 July 1945

Individual decorations

Three men earned the U.S. military's highest decoration, the Medal of Honor, while serving with the 382nd Infantry. These were Private First Class Clarence B. Craft of Company G, for assaulting Japanese-held Hen Hill on Okinawa; Private Ova A. Kelley of Company A, mortally wounded after leading an attack during the Battle of Leyte; and First Lieutenant Seymour W. Terry of Company B, mortally wounded during the fight for Zebra Hill on Okinawa.
