= Seymour W. Terry =

- Born: December 11, 1918; Little Rock, Arkansas, U.S.
- Died: May 13, 1945 (aged 26); Okinawa, Ryukyu Islands
- Burial place: Roselawn Memorial Park, Little Rock, Arkansas
- Military career
- Allegiance: United States
- Branch: United States Army
- Service years: 1943–1945
- Rank: Captain (posthumous)
- Units: 382nd Infantry Regiment, 96th Infantry Division
- Conflicts: World War II; *Battle of Okinawa †
- Awards: Medal of Honor

Seymour W. Terry (December 11, 1918 – May 13, 1945) was a United States Army officer and a recipient of the United States military's highest decoration—the Medal of Honor—for his actions in World War II.

== Biography ==
Terry joined the Army from his birth city of Little Rock, Arkansas in June 1942. He was assigned to the 382nd Infantry Regiment, 96th Infantry Division. After graduation from officer candidate school, he acted as a platoon leader, munitions officer, motor transport officer, and intelligence staff officer. A year later, he was promoted to first lieutenant. In July 1944, Lieutenant Terry took part in the invasion of Leyte, Philippines. In October 1944, he earned the Bronze Star for rescuing a wounded soldier under mortar fire.

On March 6, 1945, Terry was appointed the executive officer of Company H. His unit invaded Okinawa on April 1. Five days later. Terry was promoted to company commander. On April 27, he was transferred and made commander of Company B. On May 11, 1945, in the fight for "Zebra Hill" during the Battle of Okinawa, Terry repeatedly assaulted Japanese forces alone, despite heavy enemy fire, and encouraged his fellow soldiers in their attack. He was severely wounded by a Japanese mortar, and died of his injuries two days later. For his actions during the battle, he was promoted to captain and, on March 6, 1946, awarded the Medal of Honor.

Terry was a member of Sigma Alpha Epsilon fraternity from the fraternity's first chapter at the University of Arkansas.

Terry, aged 26 at his death, was buried at Roselawn Memorial Park in his hometown of Little Rock, Arkansas.

== Medal of Honor citation ==
Captain Terry's official Medal of Honor citation reads:

1st Lt. Terry was leading an attack against heavily defended Zebra Hill when devastating fire from 5 pillboxes halted the advance. He braved the hail of bullets to secure satchel charges and white phosphorus grenades, and then ran 30 yards directly at the enemy with an ignited charge to the first stronghold, demolished it, and moved on to the other pillboxes, bombarding them with his grenades and calmly cutting down their defenders with rifle fire as they attempted to escape. When he had finished this job by sealing the 4 pillboxes with explosives, he had killed 20 Japanese and destroyed 3 machineguns. The advance was again held up by an intense grenade barrage which inflicted several casualties. Locating the source of enemy fire in trenches on the reverse slope of the hill, 1st Lt. Terry, burdened by 6 satchel charges launched a 1-man assault. He wrecked the enemy's defenses by throwing explosives into their positions and himself accounted for 10 of the 20 hostile troops killed when his men overran the area. Pressing forward again toward a nearby ridge, his 2 assault platoons were stopped by slashing machinegun and mortar fire. He fearlessly ran across 100 yards of fire-swept terrain to join the support platoon and urge it on in a flanking maneuver. This thrust, too, was halted by stubborn resistance. 1st Lt. Terry began another 1-man drive, hurling grenades upon the strongly entrenched defenders until they fled in confusion, leaving 5 dead behind them. Inspired by this bold action, the support platoon charged the retreating enemy and annihilated them. Soon afterward, while organizing his company to repulse a possible counterattack, the gallant company commander was mortally wounded by the burst of an enemy mortar shell. By his indomitable fighting spirit, brilliant leadership, and unwavering courage in the face of tremendous odds, 1st Lt. Terry made possible the accomplishment of his unit's mission and set an example of heroism in keeping with the highest traditions of the military service.

== See also ==
- List of Medal of Honor recipients
- List of Medal of Honor recipients for World War II
