= Thirty-Second Army (Japan) =

Japanese Thirty-Second Army
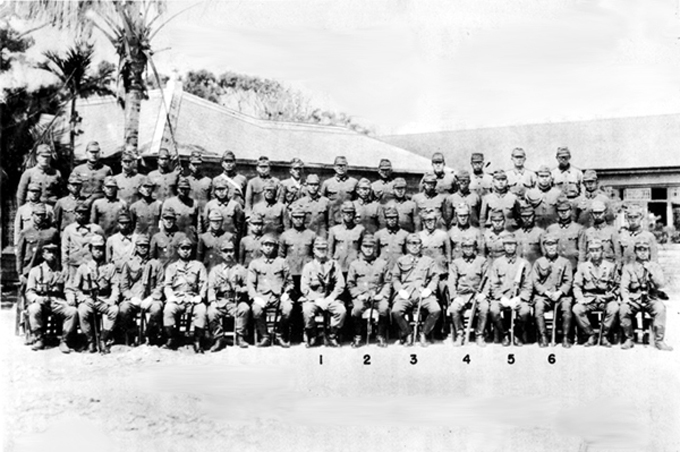
- Japanese Commanders on Okinawa: (photographed early in February 1945). In center: (1) Rear Admiral Minoru Ota, (2) Lt. Gen. Mitsuru Ushijima, (3) Lt. Gen. Isamu Cho, (4) Col. Hitoshi Kanayama, (5) Col. Kikuji Hongo, and (6) Col. Hiromichi Yahara.
- Active: March 3, 1944 – June 23, 1945
- Country: Empire of Japan
- Branch: Imperial Japanese Army
- Type: Corps
- Role: Garrison
- Garrison/HQ: Naha, Okinawa
- Nicknames: Tama-Butai (球部隊, Orb Division)
- Engagements: Battle of Okinawa

The Japanese 32nd Army (第32軍, Dai Sanjū-ni gun) was an army of the Imperial Japanese Army during the final stages of World War II. It was annihilated during the Battle of Okinawa.

== History ==
The Japanese 32nd Army was formed on March 13, 1944 as part of the last desperate defense effort by the Empire of Japan to deter possible landings of Allied forces in Okinawa and the surrounding Ryukyu Islands. The Japanese 32nd Army had 77,000 men (39,000 infantry in 31 battalions and 38,000 artillery, armor and combat service troops) plus the 10,000 man Okinawa Naval Base Force and 42,000 Okinawan conscripts. However, many of its personnel were poorly trained reservists, conscripted students and home guard militia. It was annihilated during the Battle of Okinawa from April to June, 1945.

== List of commanders ==
=== Commanding officer ===
	Name	From	To
1	Lieutenant General Masao Watanabe	22 March 1944	8 August 1944
2	Lieutenant General Mitsuru Ushijima	8 August 1944	June 22, 1945 (KIA)

=== Chief of Staff ===
	Name	From	To
1	Major General Kiyoshi Kitagawa	22 March 1944	8 July 1944
2	Lieutenant General Isamu Chō	8 July 1944	22 June 1945 (KIA)

== Structure ==
32nd Army, HQ at Naha, Okinawa

- 9th Infantry Division (transferred to Taiwan, Dec 1944)
- 24th Infantry Division - a conventional triangular division
  - 22nd Infantry Regiment
  - 23rd Infantry Regiment
  - 44th Artillery Regiment
  - 89th infantry Regiment
- 62nd Infantry Division (a light two brigade COIN division that came from China).
  - 63rd Infantry Brigade
  - 64th Infantry Brigade
- 28th Infantry Division
- 44th Independent Mixed Brigade
  - 2nd Independent Mixed Regiment
  - 15th Independent Mixed Regiment
- 45th Independent Mixed Brigade
- 59th Independent Mixed Brigade
- 60th Independent Mixed Brigade
- Independent 27th Tank Regiment
