= Clarence B. Craft =

United States Army Medal of Honor recipient

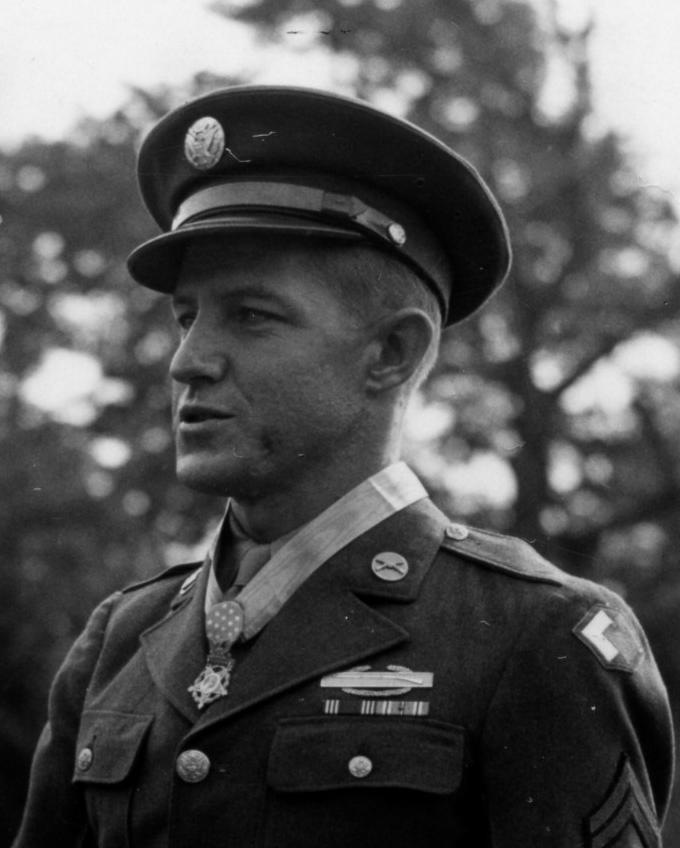
- Craft wearing his Medal of Honor, c. 1945
- Born: September 23, 1921; San Bernardino, California, U.S.
- Died: March 28, 2002 (aged 80); Fayetteville, Arkansas, U.S.
- Burial place: Fayetteville National Cemetery, Fayetteville, Arkansas
- Military career
- Allegiance: United States of America
- Branch: United States Army
- Rank: Sergeant First Class
- Units: 2nd Battalion, 382nd Infantry Regiment, 96th Infantry Division
- Conflicts: World War II; Korean War
- Awards: Medal of Honor

Clarence Byrle Craft (September 23, 1921 – March 28, 2002) was a United States Army soldier and a recipient of the United States military's highest decoration—the Medal of Honor—for his actions in World War II.

== Biography ==
Craft joined the Army from Santa Ana, California in September 1944, and by May 31, 1945, was serving as a private first class in Company G, 382nd Infantry Regiment, 96th Infantry Division. On that day, on Okinawa Island, he single-handedly attacked the Japanese-held "Hen Hill". After reaching the summit and throwing numerous hand grenades at enemy positions on the reverse slope, he assaulted the main Japanese trench, chased the defenders into a cave, and destroyed the cave with an explosive device. For these actions, he was awarded the Medal of Honor six months later, on November 1, 1945.

Craft reached the rank of sergeant first class and served in the Korean War before leaving the Army.

Over a 10-year period, Craft logged over 9,300 hours assisting veterans at the Fayetteville Veterans Administration Medical Center as a volunteer. Craft died at age 80 and was buried in Fayetteville National Cemetery, Fayetteville, Arkansas.

On November 9, 2002, a post office in Fayetteville was renamed the Clarence B. Craft Post Office Building

== Medal of Honor citation ==
Craft's official Medal of Honor citation reads:

He was a rifleman when his platoon spearheaded an attack on Hen Hill, the tactical position on which the entire Naha-Shuri-Yonaburu line of Japanese defense on Okinawa, Ryukyu Islands, was hinged. For 12 days our forces had been stalled, and repeated, heavy assaults by 1 battalion and then another had been thrown back by the enemy with serious casualties. With 5 comrades, Pfc. Craft was dispatched in advance of Company G to feel out the enemy resistance. The group had proceeded only a short distance up the slope when rifle and machinegun fire, coupled with a terrific barrage of grenades, wounded 3 and pinned down the others. Against odds that appeared suicidal, Pfc. Craft launched a remarkable 1-man attack. He stood up in full view of the enemy and began shooting with deadly marksmanship wherever he saw a hostile movement. He steadily advanced up the hill, killing Japanese soldiers with rapid fire, driving others to cover in their strongly disposed trenches, unhesitatingly facing alone the strength that had previously beaten back attacks in battalion strength. He reached the crest of the hill, where he stood silhouetted against the sky while quickly throwing grenades at extremely short range into the enemy positions. His extraordinary assault lifted the pressure from his company for the moment, allowing members of his platoon to comply with his motions to advance and pass him more grenades. With a chain of his comrades supplying him while he stood atop the hill, he furiously hurled a total of 2 cases of grenades into a main trench and other positions on the reverse slope of Hen Hill, meanwhile directing the aim of his fellow soldiers who threw grenades from the slope below him. He left his position, where grenades from both sides were passing over his head and bursting on either slope, to attack the main enemy trench as confusion and panic seized the defenders. Straddling the excavation, he pumped rifle fire into the Japanese at pointblank range, killing many and causing the others to flee down the trench. Pursuing them, he came upon a heavy machinegun which was still creating havoc in the American ranks. With rifle fire and a grenade he wiped out this position. By this time the Japanese were in complete rout and American forces were swarming over the hill. Pfc. Craft continued down the central trench to the mouth of a cave where many of the enemy had taken cover. A satchel charge was brought to him, and he tossed it into the cave. It failed to explode. With great daring, the intrepid fighter retrieved the charge from the cave, relighted the fuse and threw it back, sealing up the Japs in a tomb. In the local action, against tremendously superior forces heavily armed with rifles, machineguns, mortars, and grenades, Pfc. Craft killed at least 25 of the enemy; but his contribution to the campaign on Okinawa was of much more far-reaching consequence for Hen Hill was the key to the entire defense line, which rapidly crumbled after his utterly fearless and heroic attack.

== See also ==
- List of Medal of Honor recipients
- List of Medal of Honor recipients for World War II
