= Masao Watanabe =

Japanese lieutenant general (1888–1950)

- 渡辺 正夫
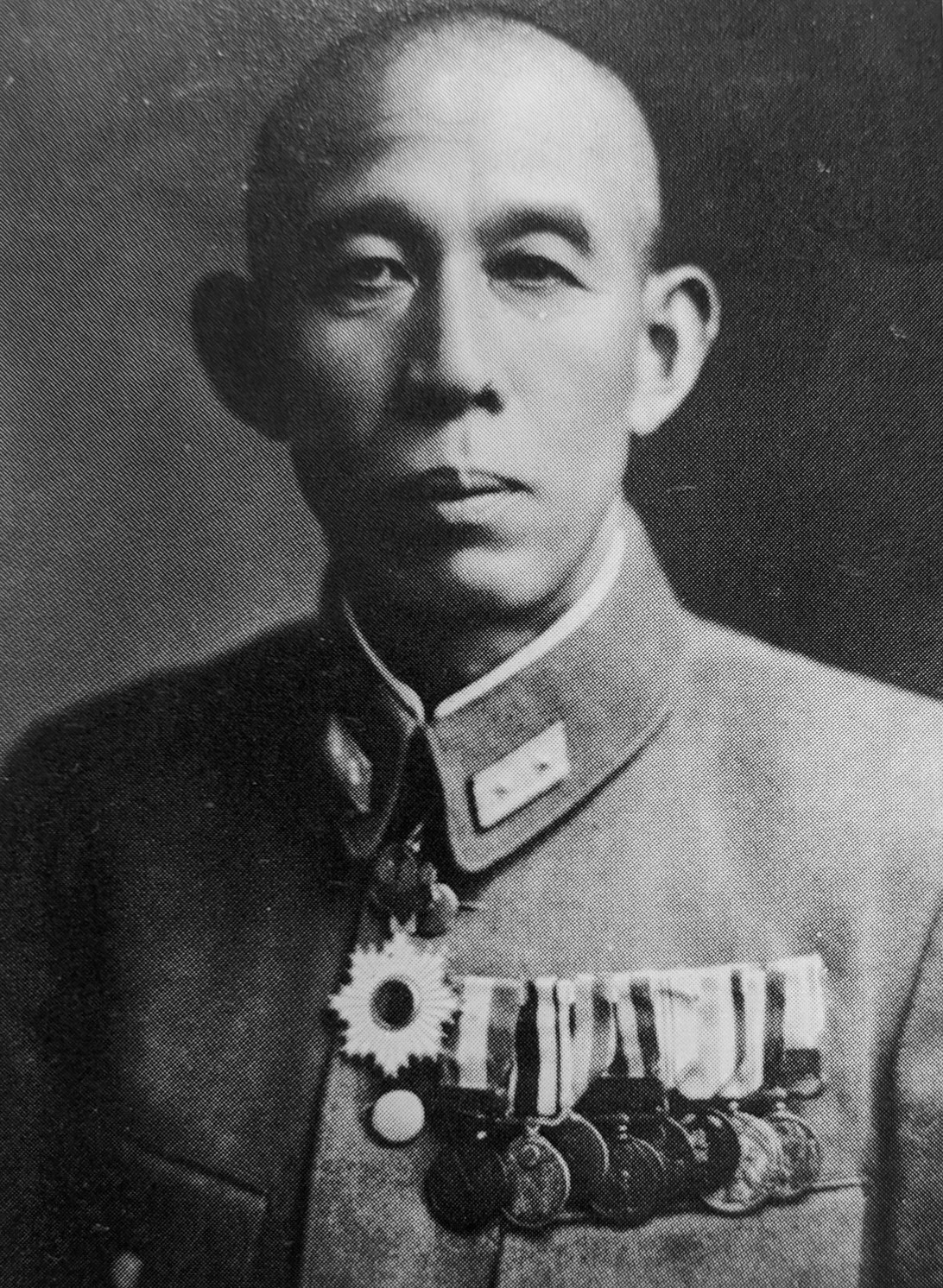
- Born: October 10, 1888; Osaka, Japan
- Died: October 11, 1950 (aged 62)
- Education: Imperial Japanese Army Academy; Army Staff College
- Military career
- Allegiance: Empire of Japan
- Branch: Imperial Japanese Army
- Service years: 1909 – 1945
- Rank: Lieutenant General
- Units: Hiroshima Port Fortress; Hōyo Strait Fortress; IJA 14th Division; Central District Army; Army Armaments Factory; IJA 25th Army
- Commands: Guards Field Artillery Battalion; IJA 56th Division; IJA 32nd Army; Army School of Science
- Conflicts: World War II; Invasion of Malaya; Burma campaign; Battle of Toungoo
- Awards: Order of the Rising Sun (1st class)

Masao Watanabe (渡辺 正夫, Watanabe Masao; 10 October 1888 – 11 October 1950) was a lieutenant general in the Imperial Japanese Army during World War II.

== Biography ==
Watanabe was the second son of a former samurai retainer of the Kishiwada Domain who became an elementary school teacher after the Meiji restoration. Watanabe attended military preparatory schools in Osaka and was a graduate of the 21st class of the Imperial Japanese Army Academy in 1909, specializing in artillery. He graduated from the 31st class of the Army Staff College in 1919. After graduation, he held various staff positions, and from 1928 was an instructor of the Army Field Artillery School. In 1928, he was promoted to the honorific title of Senior Sixth Court Rank. He was on the staff of the Hiroshima Port Fortress, the Hōyo Strait Fortress, and commanded the Guards Field Artillery Battalion, rising to the position of Chief of Staff of the IJA 14th Division in 1933, overseeing its withdrawal from Manchukuo back to Japan.

Watanabe was promoted to major general in 1937 and was made Chief of Staff of the Central District Army in Japan. From 1938 to 1940 the head of the Army Armaments Factory. He was promoted to lieutenant general in 1939. After a brief stint at the Army Aviation Technology Research Institute, he was given a field command as the commander of the newly formed IJA 56th Division from August 1940.

Although initially the 56th division was slated as reinforcements for the Japanese invasion of Malaya, the rapid cessation of British resistance resulted in division been attached to IJA 25th Army and sent to Burma in March 1942, landing in Rangoon and participating in the Battle of Toungoo. The 56th Division linked with the IJA 55th Division in Toungoo on 28 March 1942. Its reconnaissance elements forced the Chinese to evacuate the city opening the way to the east. Later the 56th Division flanked the Allied line to the east, by advancing through the mountains to the Salween River in the Karenni States. The Division defeated the Chinese 6th Corps in the Karen Hills area battles of Mawchi on 13 April 1942, Bawlake, Taunggyi and Loikaw on 20 April 1940, and forced their retreat eastward to Yunnan. Advancing north through the Shan States the 56th Division defeated elements of the Chinese 65th Corps to take the city of Lashio on the Burma Road. The fall of Lashio to the 56th Division on 29 April 1942 cut off much of the local Chinese Army from China and compelled the Allies to evacuate Burma. The Division advanced into Yunnan in pursuit of the Chinese but were halted at the Battle of Salween River by the Chinese 36th and 88th Divisions on 31 May 1942.

Following this success in combat, Watanabe was recalled to Japan, and from 1942 to 1944, was Commandant of the Army School of Science. However, with the war situation rapidly deteriorating against Japan, he was sent to the field again in March 1944 as the first commander in chief of the newly formed IJA 32nd Army, tasked with the defense of the Ryukyu Islands. Watanabe was recalled to Tokyo in August the same year, and retired from military service.

In the final stages of the war, he was recalled to duty, and assigned as commander of the Osaka region for the expected American invasion of the Japanese home islands. He was awarded with the Order of the Rising Sun, 1st class, just before the surrender of Japan. He died in 1950.

== Decorations ==
- 1945 – Grand Cordon of the Order of the Rising Sun
