= Shimonoseki Fortress =

Group of coastal fortifications in Japan

- Kanmon Strait, Japan
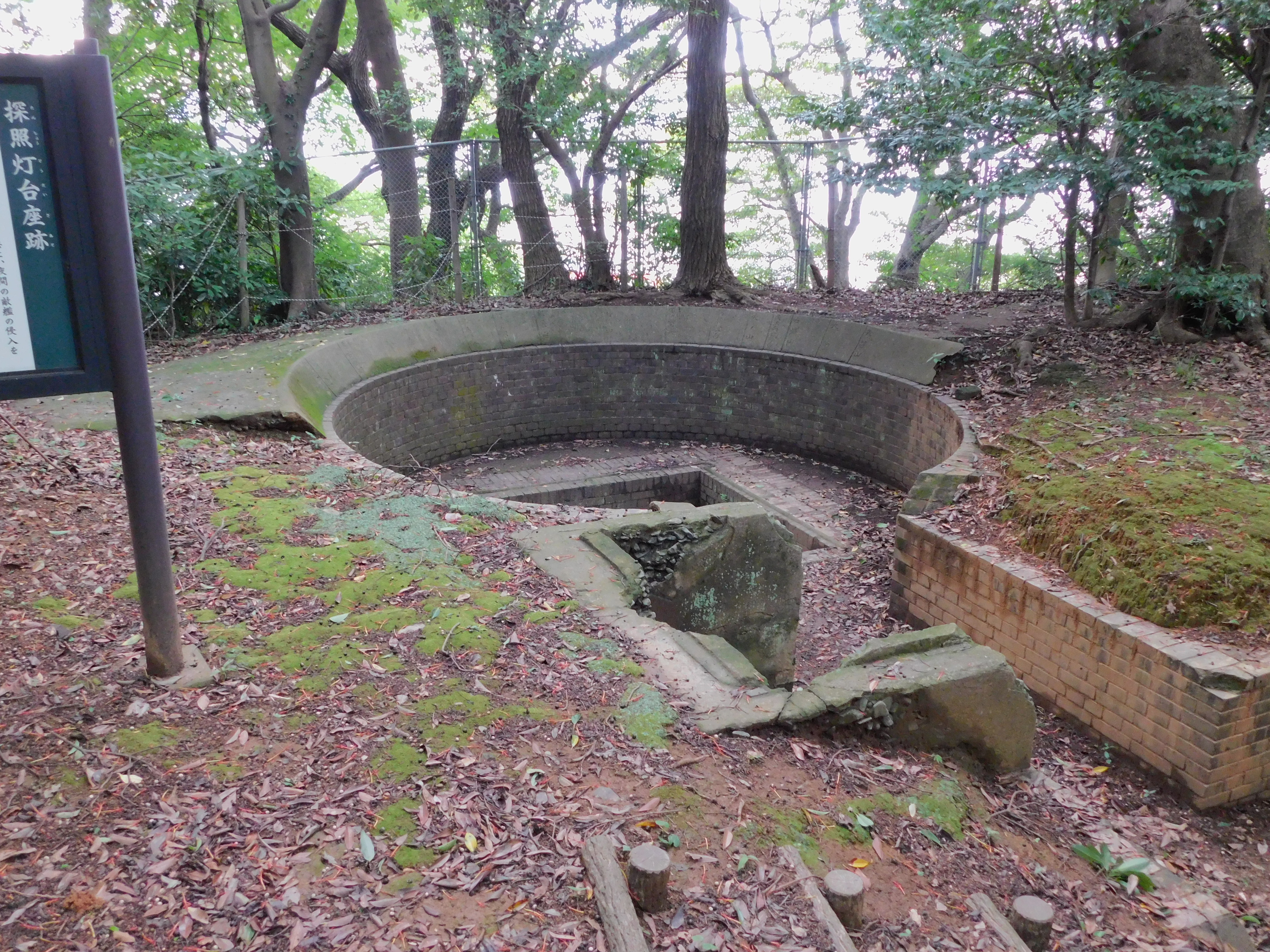
- ruins of Tamukeyama Battery

Site information
- Type: Defensive fortification
- Controlled by: Empire of Japan
- Condition: ruins

Site history
- Built: 1885–1945
- Materials: Concrete; Wood; Steel
- Demolished: 1946
- Battles/wars: World War II

Garrison information
- Occupants: Imperial Japanese Army

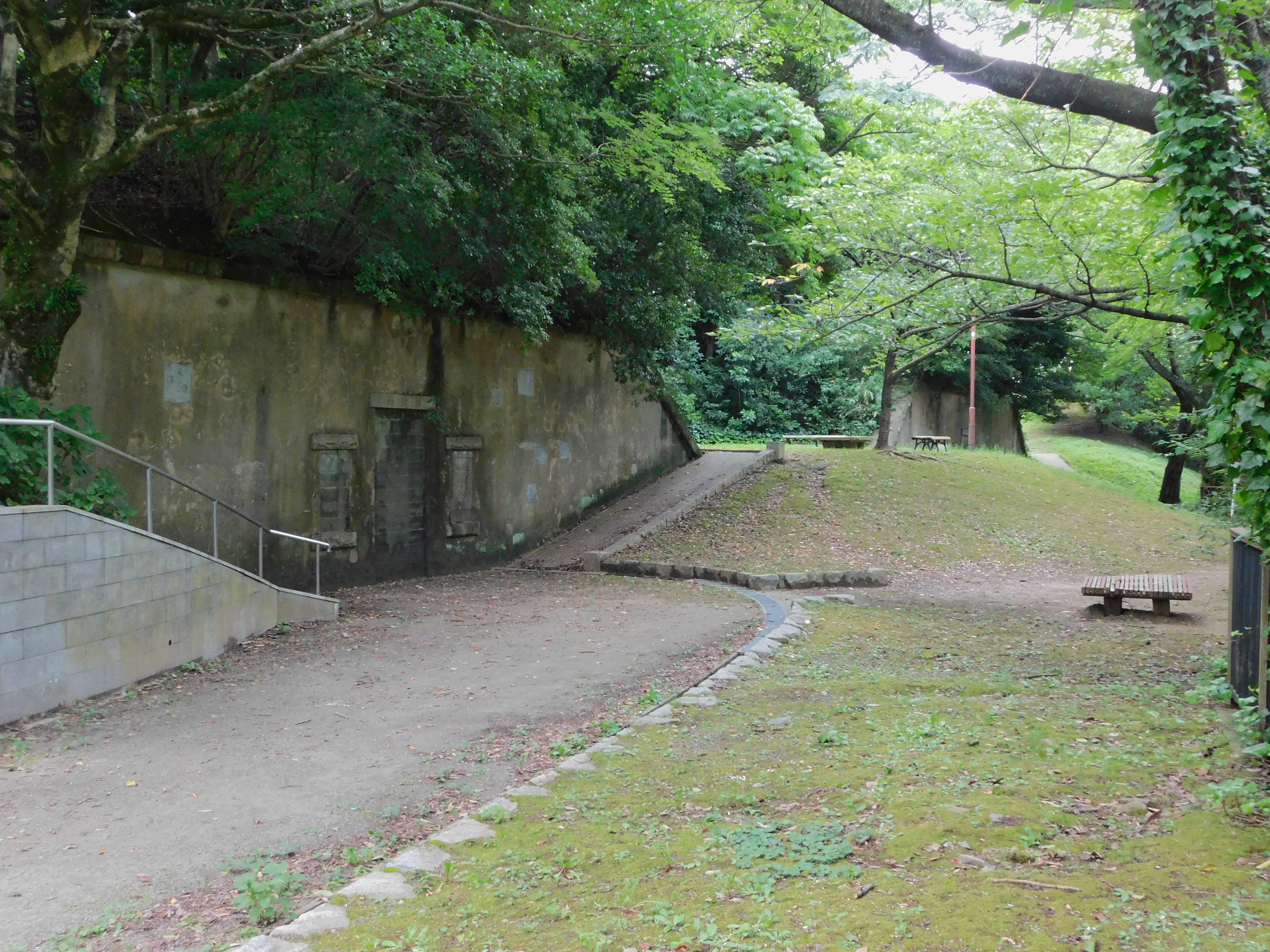
ruins of Tamukeyama Battery

Shimonoseki Fortress (下関要塞, Shimonoseki yōsai) was the name of a group of coastal fortifications built in the Meiji period to guard the entrance to Kanmon Straits separating Honshu and Kyushu, two of Japan's four main islands. These gun batteries and fortifications ceased to be used after the end of World War II.

== History ==
Passage through the narrow Kanmon Straits, which connected the Sea of Japan with the Seto Inland Sea by foreign vessels was always a sensitive issue for Japanese sovereignty. In 1863, during the Bakumatsu period, the forces of Chōshū Domain opened fire on foreign shipping passing through the strait in what was later termed the Battle of Shimonoseki Straits. This led to a punitive action by Western powers, the Bombardment of Shimonoseki in which joint naval forces from Great Britain, France, the Netherlands and the United States, destroyed the Chōshū coastal artillery batteries .

After the Meiji restoration, the primary threats to the new Empire of Japan were perceived to be Qing China's Beiyang fleet, followed by the Russian Empire's Pacific Fleet. The Meiji government ordered the construction of a new set of coastal fortifications starting in 1884, and construction started to re-fortify the Kanmon Strait from September 1887. The main facilities were constructed on the western coast of Yamaguchi Prefecture in the city of Shimonoseki and the eastern coast of Fukuoka Prefecture in what is now Kokurakita-ku and Moji-ku, Kitakyushu city, as well as on several small islands in the Genkai Sea. The Shimonoseki Garrison Command was established in April 1895. It was renamed the Shimonoseki Fortress Command in 1899.

Some of these batteries were equipped with the 28-cm howitzers of the same type which were used during the Russo-Japanese War at the Siege of Port Arthur to devastating effect against the Russian Pacific Fleet. From the 1920s and 1930s, many surplus guns of the Imperial Japanese Navy, which had been made available due to the reduction of capital warships per the London Naval Treaty and the Washington Naval Treaty, were reused in these coastal artillery installations.

After the end of the Russo-Japanese War, some of the fortifications were dismantled; however, in the 1920s and 1930s, many were re-armed, with the intention that Shimonoseki Fortress would form a link with Iki Fortress and Tsushima Fortress to control the entire Strait of Korea and thus the Japanese Empire's vitally important sea route to Korea, Manchukuo and the Asian continent. In addition, many anti-aircraft guns were installed to help protect the approaches to Kokura in northern Kyushu, which was a major industrial zone with many munitions plants.

All fortifications were dismantled at the end of World War II.

== Components of the Shimonoseki Fortress ==
=== Kyushu ===
- Tamukeyama Battery
- Tominoyama Magazine
- Kojoyama Battery
- Sasaoyama Battery
- Yahazuyama Magazine
- Mekari Battery
- Takakurayama Battery

=== Shimonoseki ===
- Tanokubi Battery
- Hinoyama Battery
- Senjogahara Battery
- Ichiriyama Magazine
- Konpirayama Mountain Artillery Battery
- Reisagiyama Magazine
- Tsujiyama Battery
- Oinoyama Battery
- Deshimatsu Battery
- Suzuyama Battery
- Kannonzaki Battery

=== Genkai Sea ===
- Futaoijima Battery
- Tsunoshima Battery
- Mutsureshima Battery
- Oshima Battery
- Okinoshima Battery
- Shirashima Battery
