= Ichinohe Hyoe =

Ichinohe Hyōe
- 一戸 兵衛
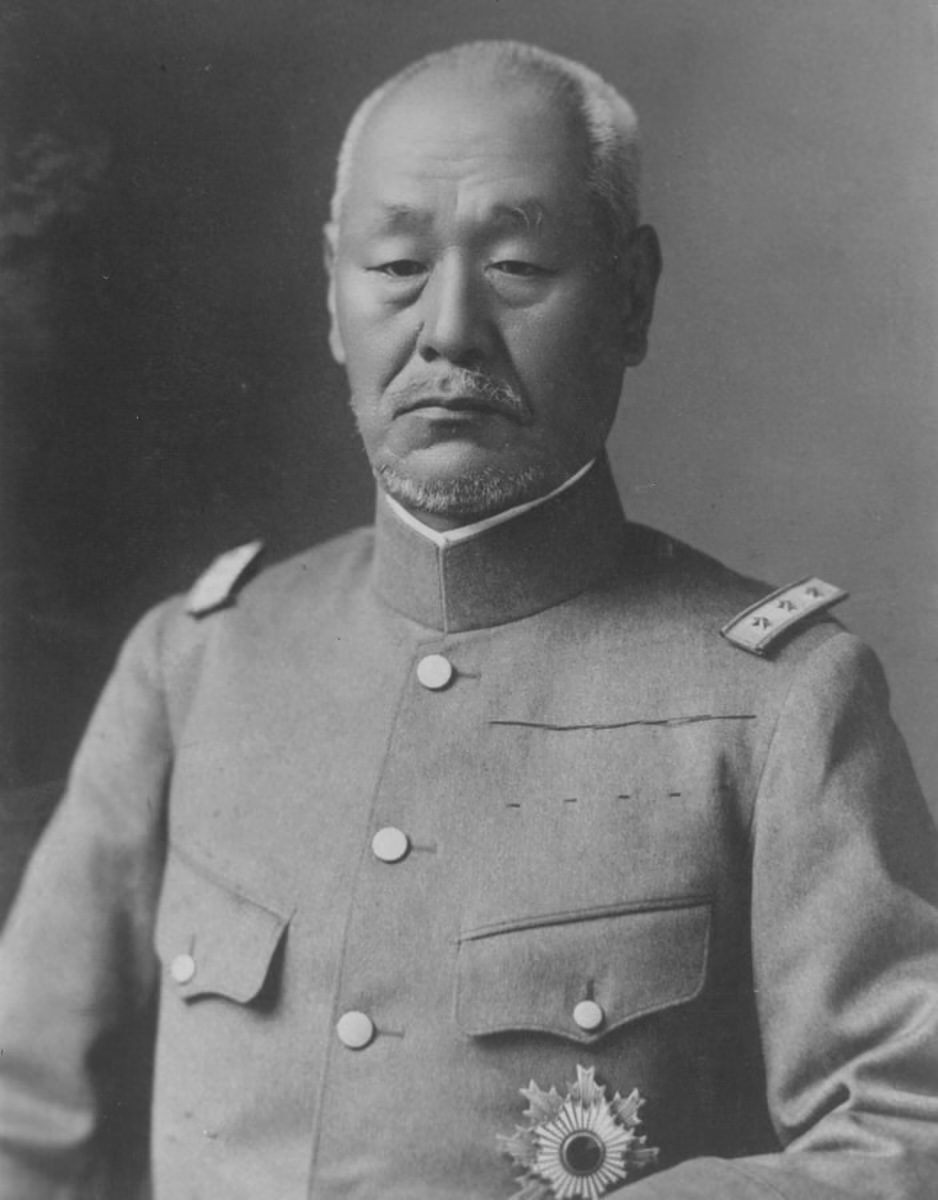
- Born: August 2, 1855; Hirosaki, Mutsu, Japan
- Died: September 2, 1931 (aged 76); Shibuya, Tokyo, Japan
- Military career
- Allegiance: Empire of Japan
- Branch: Imperial Japanese Army
- Service years: 1876–1920
- Rank: General
- Conflicts: Satsuma Rebellion; First Sino-Japanese War; Russo-Japanese War
- Awards: Order of the Golden Kite (2nd, 3rd & 4th Degrees); Order of the Rising Sun (1st class); Order of the Sacred Treasures (1st class)

Ichinohe Hyōe (一戸 兵衛; August 2, 1855 – September 2, 1931) was a Japanese soldier, military strategist, Imperial Japanese Army officer, and Shintō priest.

A meticulous planner, the casualty rate of his command was far fewer than that of his fellow officers while achieving the same objectives.

== Biography ==
Ichinohe was born as the eldest son of a samurai retainer in Tsugaru Domain (present day western Aomori Prefecture). Ichinohe enlisted in the fledgling Imperial Japanese Army and was commissioned in 1876 as a second lieutenant in the 2nd Infantry Regiment. Serving with distinction during the Satsuma Rebellion between February–September 1877, Ichinohe was wounded in battle and later awarded the rank of full lieutenant in May of that year. In February 1878, he was transferred to the 1st Infantry Regiment.

During the First Sino-Japanese War, Ichinohe was commended for his actions while commanding the advance guard for the Ōshima Mixed Brigade at the Battle of Seonghwan on July 29, 1894, and later (as a lieutenant colonel) served as battalion commander in the IJA 5th Division at the Battle of Pyongyang on September 15, 1894.

In 1897, Ichinohe was promoted to colonel and was given command of the 4th Guards Regiment. The following year, he was promoted to Chief of Staff of the IJA 6th Division.

Ichinohe was promoted to major general in May 1901, and appointed commander of the IJA 6th Division. During the Russo-Japanese War, he served on the staff of the IJA 3rd Army, and was with Marshal Ōyama Iwao at the crucial Battle of Mukden. After the war, Ichinohe became commander of the prestigious IJA 1st Division and was promoted to lieutenant general in November 1907. He was subsequently transferred to command the new IJA 17th Division. In September 1911, he was transferred to the IJA 4th Division and in January 1912, he returned to the IJA 1st Division.

Ichinohe was appointed to the Supreme War Council in February 1915, becoming a full general from August the same year. In December 1915, he was appointed to one of the top three positions within the Imperial Japanese Army, that of Inspector-General of Military Training, holding that post until his retirement from active duty in June 1920.

Ichinohe was subsequently Principal of the Gakushūin Peers' School from May 1920, and became a Shinto priest (kannushi) at Meiji Shrine from August 1924. In February 1926, he accepted the post of President of the Imperial Military Reserve Association (帝国在郷軍人会). His grave is at the Tama Cemetery, in Fuchū, Tokyo.

== Honors ==
- Grand Cordon of the Order of the Rising Sun, Paulownia Flowers; September 2, 1931
- Grand Cordon of the Order of the Sacred Treasure, November 28, 1913
- Order of the Golden Kite, 2nd class; April 1, 1906
- Order of the Golden Kite, 4th class; 18 October 1895

== Notes ==
Preceded by Uehara Yūsaku	Inspector-General of Military Training; 1914–1919	Succeeded by Otani Kikuzo
Preceded by Hōjō Tokiyuki	Chancellor of Gakushūin; 1920–1922	Succeeded by Fukuhara Ryōjirō
Preceded by Ichijō Saneteru	Chief Priest of Meiji Shrine; 1924–1931	Succeeded by Arima Ryokitsu
Preceded by Kawamura Kageaki	President of the Imperial Military Reserve Association; 1926–1931	Succeeded by Suzuki Sōroku
