= Oka Ichinosuke =

Japanese lieutenant general (1860–1916)

Baron Oka Ichinosuke
- 岡 市之助
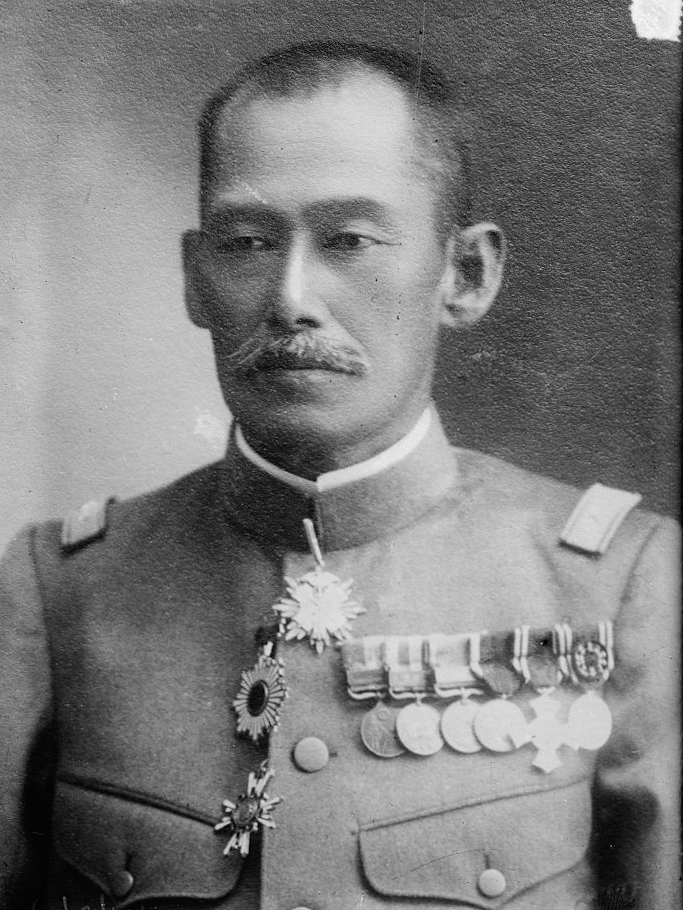

Minister of the Army
- In office 16 April 1914 – 30 March 1916
- Prime Minister: Ōkuma Shigenobu
- Preceded by: Kusunose Yukihiko
- Succeeded by: Ōshima Ken'ichi

Personal details
- Born: 28 March 1860 Hagi, Chōshū, Japan
- Died: 20 July 1916 (aged 56)
- Party: Independent

Military service
- Allegiance: Empire of Japan
- Branch/service: Imperial Japanese Army
- Years of service: 1881–1916
- Rank: Lieutenant General
- Battles/wars: First Sino-Japanese War; Russo-Japanese War; World War I

Baron Oka Ichinosuke (岡 市之助; 28 March 1860 – 20 July 1916) was a lieutenant general in the Imperial Japanese Army and Minister of War during World War I.

== Biography ==
Oka was born in Hagi in Chōshū domain (present day Yamaguchi Prefecture as the second son of a samurai retainer of the Mori clan. He graduated from the Osaka Foreign Languages School followed by the 4th class of the Imperial Japanese Army Academy in 1881, and from the 4th class of the Army Staff College in 1888.

Oka served as Vice Commander of the IJA 8th Infantry Brigade, and subsequently as squad leader in the IJA 20th Infantry Regiment. During the First Sino-Japanese War, he was on the staff of the IJA 1st Division, which was engaged in the brunt of combat operations during that conflict.

After the war, Oka served in various administrative and staff positions within the Imperial Japanese Army General Staff. At the time of the Russo-Japanese War, he was the vice chief of the Military Affairs Department. Oka was promoted to major general in 1905. He subsequently commanded the IJA 27th Infantry Brigade and the IJA 29th Infantry Brigade before being promoted to lieutenant general in February 1912, and commander of the IJA 3rd Division in 1913.

In April 1914, Oka became Minister of War under Prime Minister Ōkuma Shigenobu. During his tenure, he was steadfastly uncompromising in his demands for an increased Army budget to raise two new infantry divisions for Korea, and strongly rejected arguments by Finance Minister Wakatsuki Reijiro that unbridled military expenditures was bankrupting the nation. On then other hand, Oka unexpectedly opposed his mentor Yamagata Aritomo in many political issues, siding with Okuma Shigenobu and Kato Takaaki against the Rikken Seiyūkai.

He resigned in March 1916 due to ill health, and was ennobled with the title of baron (danshaku) under the kazoku peerage system just before his death in July of the same year.

== Decorations ==
- 1895 – Order of the Rising Sun, 6th class
- 1895 – Order of the Golden Kite, 4th class
- 1900 – Order of the Sacred Treasure, 5th class
- 1906 – Order of the Rising Sun, 2nd class
- 1906 – Order of the Golden Kite, 3rd class
- 1914 – Grand Cordon of the Order of the Sacred Treasure
- 1916 – Grand Cordon of the Order of the Rising Sun
