= Japanese military attachés in foreign service =

List of Japanese military attachés in foreign service

== Austria-Hungary ==
- Shizuo Matsuoka: military attaché, Austria-Hungary, September 1909
- Hisaichi Terauchi: assistant military attaché, Austria-Hungary, December 1911
- Tomoyuki Yamashita: military attaché (Lt. Col.), Austria—Hungary, February 1927

== Belgium ==
- Yuitsu Tsuchihashi: military attaché, France — and, concurrently, Belgium, August 1937

== Canada ==
- Tadamichi Kuribayashi: military attaché, Canada, April 1930

== China ==
- Fukushima Yasumasa: military attaché, China, 1882–1884
- Shigeru Honjō: military attaché, China, 1907–1908
- Seiichi Kita: resident officer, China, February 1921, Resident Officer, China, May 1927
- Kenji Doihara: official duty, China, December 1922
- Teiichi Suzuki: assistant military attaché, China, December 1929
- Yuitsu Tsuchihashi: concurrently military attaché, China, December 1940. Spelled as "Tsuchiachi" in French literature.

== Denmark ==
- Tetsuzan Nagata: language officer, Denmark, June 1915;

== England ==
- Masaharu Homma: resident officer, also military student, England, August 1918 (and served as observer with British forces in France)
- Hitoshi Imamura: assistant military attaché, England, October 1918
- Ando Rikichi: resident officer, England, January 1919
- Shizuichi Tanaka: resident officer, England, March 1919
- Seiichi Kita: resident officer, England, September 1927
- Shigenori Kuroda: resident officer, England, January 1922

== France ==
- Ishimoto Shinroku: resident officer, 1879 to 1882, also studying at St. Cyr military academy
- Terauchi Masatake: resident officer, 1883 to 1886, also studying at St. Cyr military academy
- Yoshitoshi Tokugawa: military attaché, France, 1909–1910, obtained pilot's licence from Aéro-Club de France
- Keisuke Fujie: assistant military attaché, France, August 1917
- Naruhiko Higashikuni: resident officer, France, studying military tactics, April 1920
- Mineichi Koga: resident officer, France, 1920–1922; naval attaché France, 1926–1928
- Kanji Nishihara: resident officer, France, February 1926
- Korechika Anami: official duty, France, August 1927
- Ishiro Shichida: resident officer, France, May 1931
- Takushiro Hattori: resident officer, France, June 1934; observer, Italo-Ethiopian War, October 1935
- Yuitsu Tsuchihashi: military attaché, France—and, concurrently, Belgium, August 1937. Spelled as "Tsuchiachi" in French.

== Germany ==
- Fukushima Yasumasa: military attaché, Germany, 1887–1892
- Toshizō Nishio: language officer, Germany, August 1912
- Tetsuzan Nagata: language officer, Germany, October 1913
- Hideki Tōjō: official duty, Germany, July 1921;
- Yoshio Kozuki: language officer, Germany, November 1921
- Heitarō Kimura: resident officer, Germany, January 1922
- Kenzo Kitano: resident officer, Germany, September 1922
- Kanji Ishiwara: language officer, Germany, July 1922
- Takeo Yasuda: resident officer, Germany, January 1922;
- Mitsuo Nakazawa: resident officer, Germany, July 1923;
- Sōsaku Suzuki: resident officer, Germany, March 1923
- Isamu Yokoyama: resident officer, Germany (Major), August 1924
- Takuma Shimoyama: resident officer, Germany, March 1925
- Masakazu Kawabe: military attaché Germany, August 1929
- Kioji Tominaga: official duty, Germany, December 1935
- Hiroshi Ōshima: stationed in Berlin as military attaché working for alliance between Japan and Nazi Germany (Anti-Comintern Pact, 1937; Tripartite Alliance, 1940); Ambassador to Germany, 1940
- Kitsuju Ayabe: member, Military Observer Mission to Germany and Italy (under LtGen Yamashita), December 1940-July 1941

== India ==
- Gen Sugiyama: military attaché India, February 1915
- Masaharu Homma: resident officer, India, August 1922
- Hitoshi Imamura: resident officer, India, April 1927
- Rikichi Andō: military attaché, India, August 1925
- Hideyoshi Obata: resident officer, India, November 1927
- Shigenori Kuroda: military attaché, India, August 1935

== Italy ==
- Ishimoto Shinroku: resident officer, 1883 to 1887
- Shigetarō Shimada: assistant naval attaché Italy, August 1936; naval attaché, same country, December 1917

== Manchukuo ==
- Otosaburo Yano: Japanese military attaché, Hsinking, Manchukuo
- Tadashi Hanaya: (head) Japanese military attaché, Hsinking, Manchukuo
- Shun Akifusa: (head) Harbin military attaché mission, Manchukuo

== Mexico ==
- Shizuichi Tanaka: military attaché, Mexico, May 1926

== Philippines ==
- Gen Sugiyama: official duty, Philippines, February 1912
- Masafumi Yamauchi: official tor to the Philippines, 1934–1935

== Poland ==
- Kiichiro Higuchi: military attaché, Japanese legation, Poland, May 1925
- Harukichi Hyakutake: resident officer, Poland, December 1925
- Okikatsu Arao: assistant military attaché, Poland, March 1936
- Masataka Yamawaki: military attaché to Warsaw, 1934–1935

== Singapore ==
- Gen Sugiyama: official duty, Singapore, October 1912

== Soviet Union ==
- Sadao Araki: language officer, Russia, November 1909; Military Attaché, Russia, May 1913
- Mitsumasa Yonai: resident naval officer, Russia, 1915
- Kioji Tominaga: assistant military attaché, USSR, December 1928
- Torashirō Kawabe: resident officer, Riga, Latvia (studying Soviet military affairs), January 1926, Military Attaché, U.S.S.R., February 1932 April 1934
- Saburo Hayashi: served in the Soviet Union during 1938 as a language officer, later in 1939 was Assistant Military Attaché in Moscow.
- Michitake Yamaoka: military attaché to the Soviet Union (1940–1943)

== Sweden ==
- Tetsuzan Nagata: military attaché, Sweden, June 1921

== Switzerland ==
- Masakazu Kawabe: resident officer, Switzerland, April 1918
- Hideki Tōjō: official duty, Switzerland, August 1919
- Yoshijirō Umezu: military attaché, Switzerland, November 1919
- Kioji Tominaga: member, Japanese Delegation to General Disarmament Conference, Geneva, December 1931
- Kanji Ishiwara: member, Japanese Delegation to Geneva Conference, October 1932
- Keisuke Fujie: member of Japanese Delegation, General Disarmament Conference, Geneva, August 1931

== Turkey ==
- Jo Iimura: military attaché, Turkey, January 1930;
- Kingoro Hashimoto: attaché duty, Japanese Embassy, Turkey

== United States ==
- Osami Nagano: military attaché, United States, 1920–1923
- Hisakazu Tanaka: language officer, United States, 1923–1924
- Isoroku Yamamoto: military attaché, United States, 1925–1928
- Tadamichi Kuribayashi: resident officer, United States, September 1927
- Kumaichi Teramoto: assistant military attaché, United States, December 1928
- Shizuichi Tanaka: military attaché, United States, May 1932
- Hiromichi Yahara: military attaché, United States, 1933–1934
- Joichiro Sanada: official duty, United States, September 1936-September 1937
- Hideo Iwakuro: special duty, United States, 1941

== Military attaches in Diplomatic missions ==
=== Concurrent Mission to Europe ===
- Shizuo Yokoyama: official duty, Europe, September 1934
- Joichiro Sanada: official duty, Europe, September 1936-September 1937
- Hitoshi Imamura: official duty, Europe, August 1920
- Shunroku Hata: official duty, Europe, December
- Kenji Doihara: official duty, Europe, May 1921
- Rikichi Andō: official duty, Europe, September 1921

=== Assistant to Peace Conference February 1919 ===
- Jo Iimura: member, Plenipotentiary's Suite, Peace Conference, February 1919
- Shunroku Hata: member, Plenipotentiary's Suite, Peace Conference, February 1919

=== Assistant to Mission to League of Nations,1920-23 ===
- Heisuke Yanagawa: member of the Japanese Military Mission to League of Nations during 1920-23 period

=== Washington Naval Conference, 1921-1922 ===
- Katō Tomosaburō: Navy minister and plenipotentiary
- Osami Nagano: military attaché, United States, 1920–1923

=== Assistant to London Conference 1929-May 30 ===
- Torashirō Kawabe: member, Japanese delegation, London Conference, 1929-May 1930
- Heitarō Kimura: member, Japanese delegation, London Conference, 1929-May 1930

=== Assistant to General Disarmament Conference, Geneva 1931-32 ===
- Keisuke Fujie: member of Japanese delegation, General Disarmament Conference, Geneva, August 1931
- Kioji Tominaga: member, Japanese delegation to General Disarmament Conference, Geneva, December 1931
- Kanji Ishiwara: member, Japanese delegation to Geneva Conference, October 1932

=== Assistant to Ho-Umezu Agreement June 1935 ===
- Yoshihiro Umezu: commanding general, China Garrison Army, March 1934 (Ho-Umezu Agreement, June 1935);

=== Member in Yamashita s Mission to Europe(Germany and Italy), December 1940-July 1941 ===
- Kitsuju Ayabe: member, military observer Lt. Gen. Yamashita's diplomatic mission to Germany and Italy in December 1940 - July 1941

=== Special Military Attaché in Germany ===
- Kazuo Otani: special military Attaché in Germany, official representative for buying armaments, also heavy supporter and liaison with the Nazis

=== Army attaché in Matsuoka's mission to Europe and Russia ===
- Yatsuji Nagai: Army attaché in Matsuoka's Diplomatic Mission to Europe and Russia

=== Army diplomatic support to Washington diplomatic mission ===
- Hideo Iwakuro: Army foreign affairs officer, provided diplomatic support to the Washington mission

=== Special aide to Nomura Mission to Washington ===
- Kaname Wakasugi: special aide to Nomura Mission to Washington

== Works cited ==
- 井竿富雄 (Tomio Izao) (March 2011). 宮野の宰相 寺内正毅 [Miyano's Prime Minister, Terauchi Masatake]. In 伊藤幸司 (Kōji Itō) (ed.). 「歴史と文化」の新視点 [A New Perspective on "History and Culture"]. 大学的やまぐちガイド (University-style Guide to Yamaguchi) (in Japanese). Shōwadō. ISBN 9784812210697.
