= Ishimoto =

Ishimoto (written: 石元 or 石本) is a Japanese surname. People with the surname include:

- Dale Ishimoto (1923–2004), American actor
- Ishimoto Shinroku (1854–1912), Japanese general and statesman
- Sakura Ishimoto (石本 さくら, born 1999), Japanese shogi player
- Takashi Ishimoto (1935–2009), Japanese swimmer
- Takeharu Ishimoto (born 1970), Japanese video game music composer
- Yasuhiro Ishimoto (1921–2012), Japanese-American photographer
- Mishio Ishimoto (1893–1940), Japanese seismologist
