= Tachibana Koichirō =

Japanese politician (1861–1929)

Baron Tachibana Koichirō
- 立花 小一郎
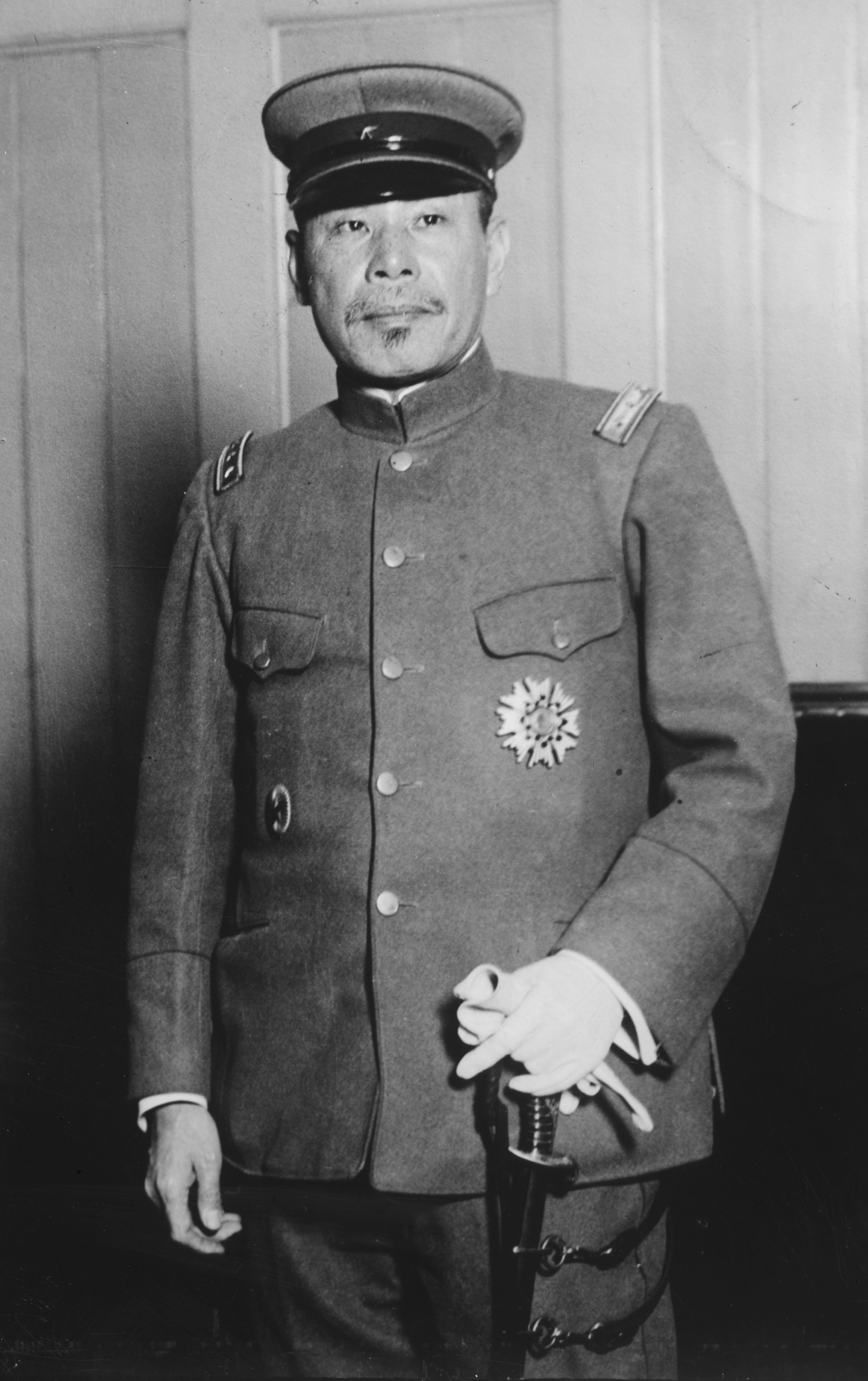
- Kōichirō c. 1920
- Born: 20 March 1861; Miike, Chikuzen, Japan
- Died: 15 February 1929 (aged 67); Yoyogi, Tokyo, Japan
- Resting place: Tama Cemetery
- Military career
- Allegiance: Empire of Japan
- Branch: Imperial Japanese Army
- Service years: 1883–1923
- Rank: General
- Conflicts: First Sino-Japanese War; Russo-Japanese War; Siberian Intervention
- Awards: Order of the Golden Kite (3rd class); Grand Cordon of the Order of the Rising Sun

Member of the House of Peers
- In office 10 July 1925 – 15 February 1929 Elected by the Barons

Member of the Supreme War Council
- In office 6 November 1922 – 17 March 1923
- Monarch: Taishō

Baron Tachibana Koichirō (立花小一郎; 20 March 1861 – 15 February 1929) was a general in the early Imperial Japanese Army, and later a politician in the Diet of the Empire of Japan.

== Biography ==
=== Military career ===
Tachibana was born as the eldest son to a samurai family in Miike Domain (present day Ōmuta, Fukuoka). In December 1883 he entered the sixth class of the predecessor of the Imperial Japanese Army Academy and was commissioned as a second lieutenant in the fledgling Imperial Japanese Army. He graduated with honors from the 5th class of the Army Staff College in December 1889 and was assigned to the Imperial Japanese Army General Staff Office. During the First Sino-Japanese War, Tachibana served as a junior officer on the staff of the Japanese First Army. After the end of the war, from 1896 to 1899, he was sent to Austria-Hungary for further training.

On his return to Japan, Tachibana was assigned to the Japanese China Garrison Army, becoming a military advisor to Yuan Shikai. On his return to Japan, he became the bureau head of the Personnel Department of the Ministry of the Army.

With the start of the Russo-Japanese War, Tachibana was deputy chief-of-staff of the Japanese Fourth Army under General Nozu Michitsura. In March 1905 he was promoted to colonel and was ordered back to Japan shortly after the Battle of Mukden to serve on the staff of the Imperial General Headquarters. He was one of the representatives of Japan at the Treaty of Portsmouth negotiations ending the war, later remaining as a military attaché to the United States.

In August 1908, Tachibana was promoted to major general and commanded the IJA 22nd Infantry Brigade, followed by the IJA 30th Infantry Brigade and the 1st Guards Brigade. He was subsequently chief-of-staff of the Japanese Chosen Army and head of the Kempeitai under the Chosen Government-General. In August 1914, Tachibana was promoted to lieutenant general. He was then assigned command of the IJA 19th Infantry Division, followed by the IJA 4th Infantry Division and was the first commander-in-chief of the newly formed Kwantung Army from 1919 to 1921.

In August 1920, Tachibana was promoted to general and from January 1921 to November 1922 was appointed the final commander-in-chief of the Japanese expeditionary force in the Japanese intervention in Siberia. This promotion was over the objections of Army Chief-of-Staff General Uehara Yusaku, who had wanted Tachibana to take over the more prestigious role of Inspector General of Military Training. At a press conference in Vladivostok, Tachibana stated that he hoped that the Far Eastern Republic would soon establish a stable, democratic and independent government in the region, as Japan had no interest in remaining to interfere in Russian politics.

Afterwards, Tachibana returned to Japan and served on the Supreme War Council. He entered the reserves in March 1923, and was ennobled with the title of baron (danshaku) under the kazoku peerage system in October of the same year. He was also promoted to the honorific title of Junior Second Court Rank.

=== Political career ===
From August 1924 to August 1925, Tachibana served as mayor of the city of Fukuoka. From July 1925 to his death in February 1929, he held a seat in the House of Peers in the Diet of Japan.

== Decorations ==
- 1906 – Order of the Rising Sun, 3rd class
- 1906 – Order of the Golden Kite, 3rd class
- 1915 – Order of the Rising Sun, 2nd class
- 1920 – Grand Cordon of the Order of the Rising Sun
