= Kigoshi Yasutsuna =

Japanese politician

Senior Second Rank Baron Kigoshi Yasutsuna
- 木越 安綱
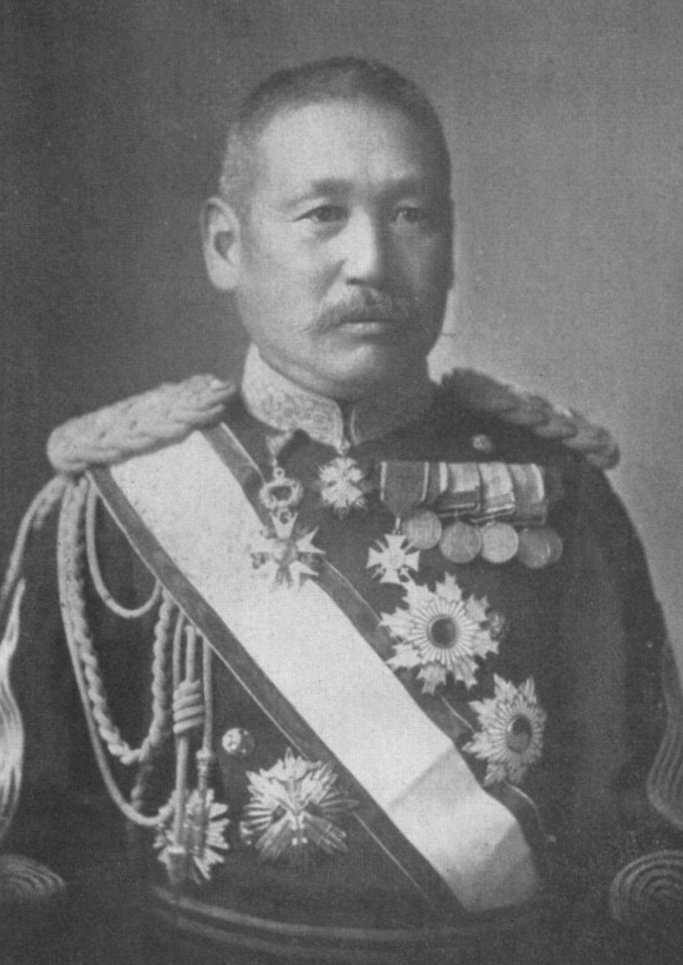

Minister of the Army
- In office 21 December 1912 – 24 June 1913
- Prime Minister: Katsura Tarō; Yamamoto Gonnohyōe
- Preceded by: Uehara Yūsaku
- Succeeded by: Kusunose Yukihiko

Member of the House of Peers
- In office 15 May 1920 – 26 March 1932 Elected by the Barons

Personal details
- Born: 22 April 1854 Kanazawa, Kaga, Japan
- Died: 26 March 1932 (aged 77) Nakano, Tokyo, Japan
- Resting place: Aoyama Cemetery

Military service
- Allegiance: Empire of Japan
- Branch/service: Imperial Japanese Army
- Years of service: 1880–1917
- Rank: Lieutenant General
- Commands: IJA 12th Division, IJA 2nd Army, IJA 4th Army, Manchurian Army
- Battles/wars: Satsuma Rebellion; First Sino-Japanese War; Russo-Japanese War

Baron Kigoshi Yasutsuna (木越 安綱; 22 April 1854 – 26 March 1932) was a general in the Imperial Japanese Army and Minister of War.

== Biography ==
Kigoshi was born as the eldest son to a samurai family of the Kaga Domain (present day Kanazawa, Ishikawa Prefecture). In 1875, while still a student at the very first class of the Imperial Japanese Army Academy, he participated in combat during the Satsuma Rebellion. He was sent as a military attaché for training in Prussia from 1883. After his return to Japan, Kigoshi served as Chief of Staff of the IJA 3rd Division in the First Sino-Japanese War.

In 1898, Kigoshi was promoted to major general and was assigned as Chief of Staff of the Taiwan Army of Japan. From 1901 to 1902, he served on the Imperial Japanese Army General Staff and was given a field command again during the Russo-Japanese War, where he commanded of the IJA 23rd Infantry Brigade, which especially distinguished itself during the Battle of Sandepu.

After the war, he served on the staff of the Manchurian Army, and subsequently as commander of the IJA 1st Division, IJA 5th Division and IJA 6th Division. In 1907, he was ennobled with the title of baron (danshaku) under the kazoku peerage system.

Kigoshi was also promoted to lieutenant general in 1907. In January 1913, he became Minister of War under the First Yamamoto Gonnohyōe cabinet. Under his tenure and with his support, the "Military Ministers to be Active-Duty Officers Law" (軍部大臣現役武官制, Gumbu daijin gen'eki bukan sei) was abolished, much to the outrage of the Army General Staff, who ensured that Kigoshi would be bypassed for promotion to full general. He entered the reserves in 1914, and retired from military service immediately afterwards. From 1920 until his death in 1932, Kigoshi served as a member of the House of Peers in the Diet of Japan. His grave is at Aoyama Cemetery in Tokyo.

== Notes ==
Political offices
Preceded by Uehara Yūsaku	War Minister; 21 December 1912 – 24 June 1913	Succeeded by Kusunose Yukihiko
