= Order of the Golden Kite =

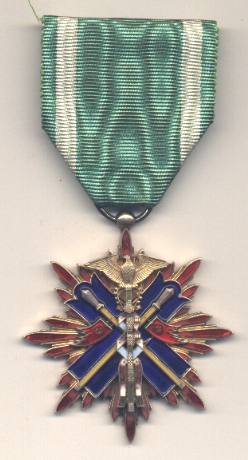
- Order of the Golden Kite, 5th Class
- Type: Seven-class military award
- Awarded for: Bravery, leadership or command in battle
- Presented by: Empire of Japan
- Eligibility: Military personnel only
- Campaigns: First Sino-Japanese War; Russo-Japanese War; World War I; Manchurian Incident; Second Sino-Japanese War; World War II
- Status: No longer awarded; abolished in 1947
- Established: 12 February 1890
- First award: 1890
- Final award: 1945

Highlights
- Total: 1,067,492
- Ribbon of the Order of the Golden Kite

The Order of the Golden Kite (金鵄勲章, Kinshi Kunshō) was an order of the Empire of Japan, established on 12 February 1890 by Emperor Meiji "in commemoration of Jimmu Tennō, the Romulus of Japan". It was abolished in 1947 by the Supreme Commander for the Allied Powers (SCAP) during the occupation of Japan, after World War II.

== Background ==
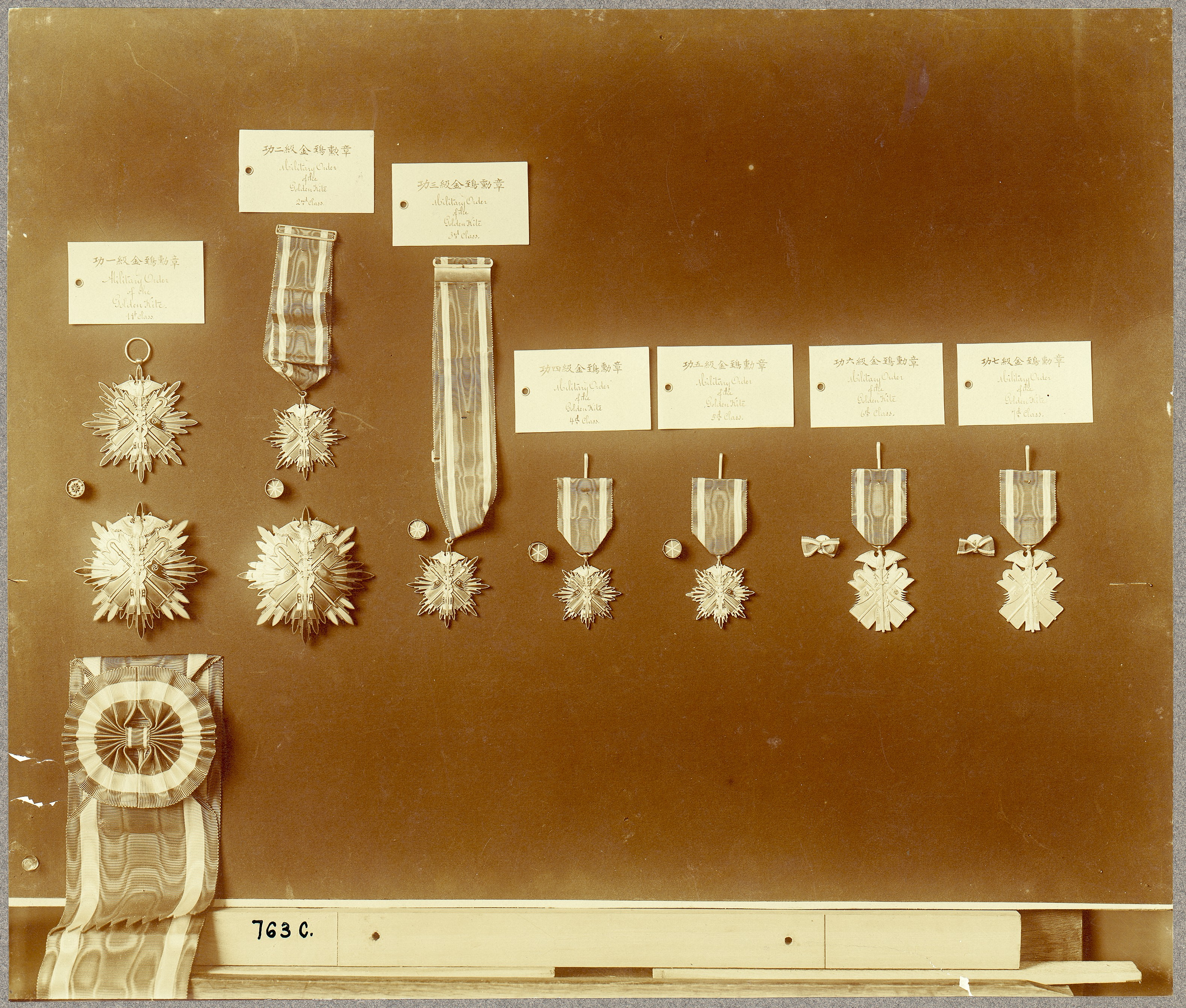
Classes of the Order of the Golden Kite

The Order of the Golden Kite was an exclusively military award, conferred for bravery, leadership or command in battle. It ranked just below the Order of the Chrysanthemum in precedence and was the military equivalent of the Order of the Paulownia Flowers. It could be considered analogous to the Prussian Order of the Red Eagle (with swords).

The order consisted of seven classes. Enlisted rank soldiers were eligible for the 7th–5th classes, non-commissioned officers were eligible for the 6th–4th classes, junior officers for the 5th–3rd classes, field grade officers for the 4th–2nd classes and general officers for the 3rd-1st classes.

A total of 1,067,492 Order of the Golden Kite awards were made over the history of the order, most of them in the two lower 6th and 7th classes. Only 41 of the 1st class and 201 of the 2nd class were awarded.

By conflict:

- First Sino-Japanese War: about 2,000
- Russo-Japanese War: about 109,600
- World War I: about 3,000
- Manchurian Incident: about 9,000
- Second Sino-Japanese War (1937–1941): about 190,000
- World War II: about 630,000

The award came with an annual monetary stipend, fixed in 1916. This was awarded for the lifetime of the recipient, and following his death, it would be awarded to the recipient's family for one year after. If the recipient died within 5 years of receiving the honor, the stipend would be awarded to the family until the end of the 5-year period. In 1939, the stipends stood as follows:

- 1st Class – 1500 yen
- 2nd Class – 1000 yen
- 3rd Class – 700 yen
- 4th Class – 500 yen
- 5th Class – 350 yen
- 6th Class – 250 yen
- 7th Class – 150 yen

Since the monthly pay for a private in the Imperial Japanese Army at the time was 8 yen, 80 sen, this amounted to a very substantial reward. The monetary stipend was abolished in 1940.

The honor was sometimes awarded individually, sometimes awarded en masse. In mid-October 1942, posthumous awards were announced following ceremonies at the Yasukuni Shrine. Posthumous honorees included 995 who were lost in combat in the far-flung Pacific War battles and 3,031 who were lost fighting in China. In this instance, Tokyo's official radio broadcast of the list of posthumous recipients of the Order of the Golden Kite was monitored by Allied forces in Asia. The number of honorees was not considered remarkable at the time, but the number of posthumous awards was considered noteworthy by Allied analysts. Specific high ranking naval and army officers were named; and in addition, special mention was given to 55 naval aviators and 9 "members of a special attack flotilla"—presumably miniature submarines taking part in the attack on Pearl Harbor.

The order of the Golden Kite was officially abolished by the Supreme Commander of the Allied Powers of Occupied Japan in 1947.

Classes
Seventh Class	Sixth Class	Fifth Class	Fourth Class
Third Class	Second Class	Grand Cordon	

== Symbolism ==
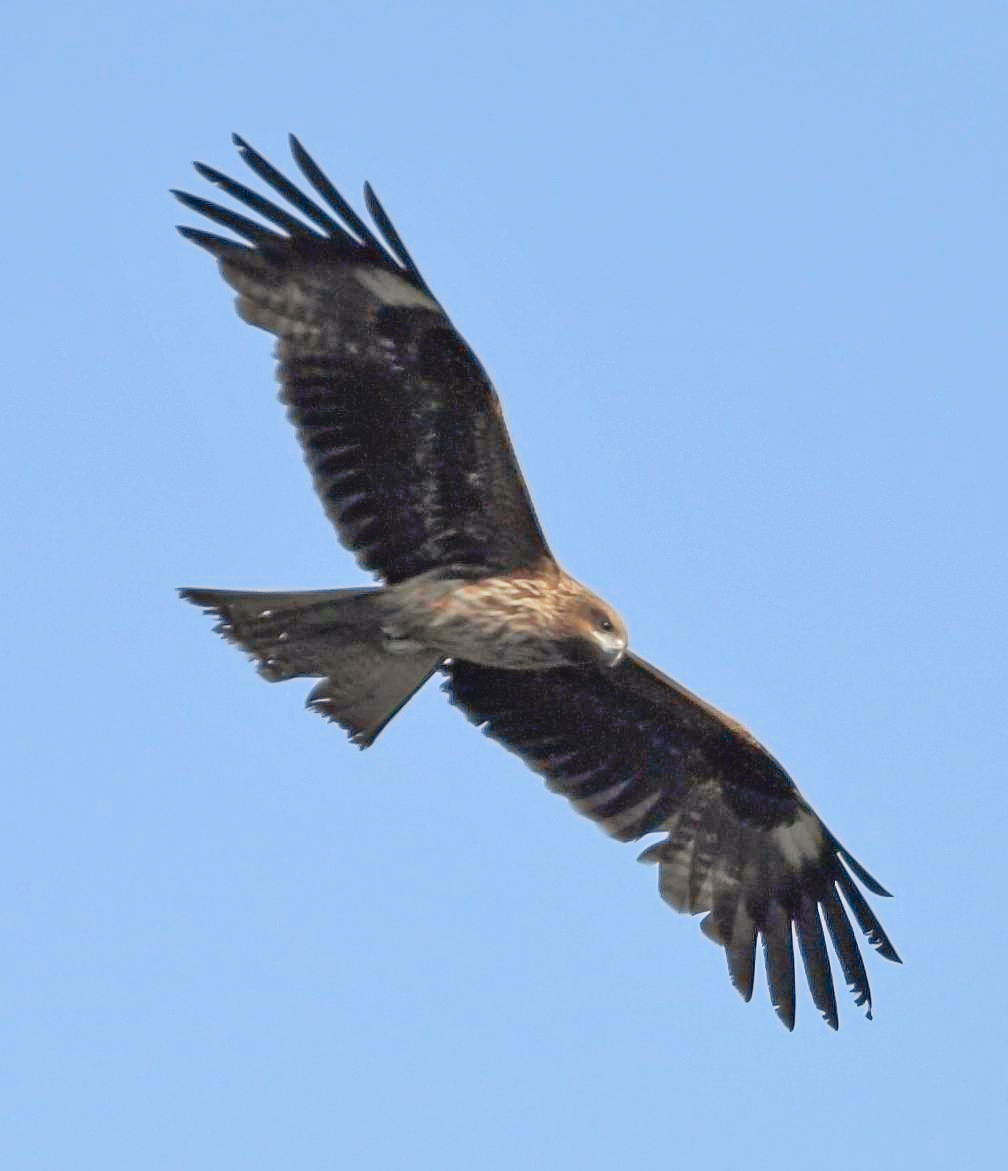
Golden kite (Milvus migrans)

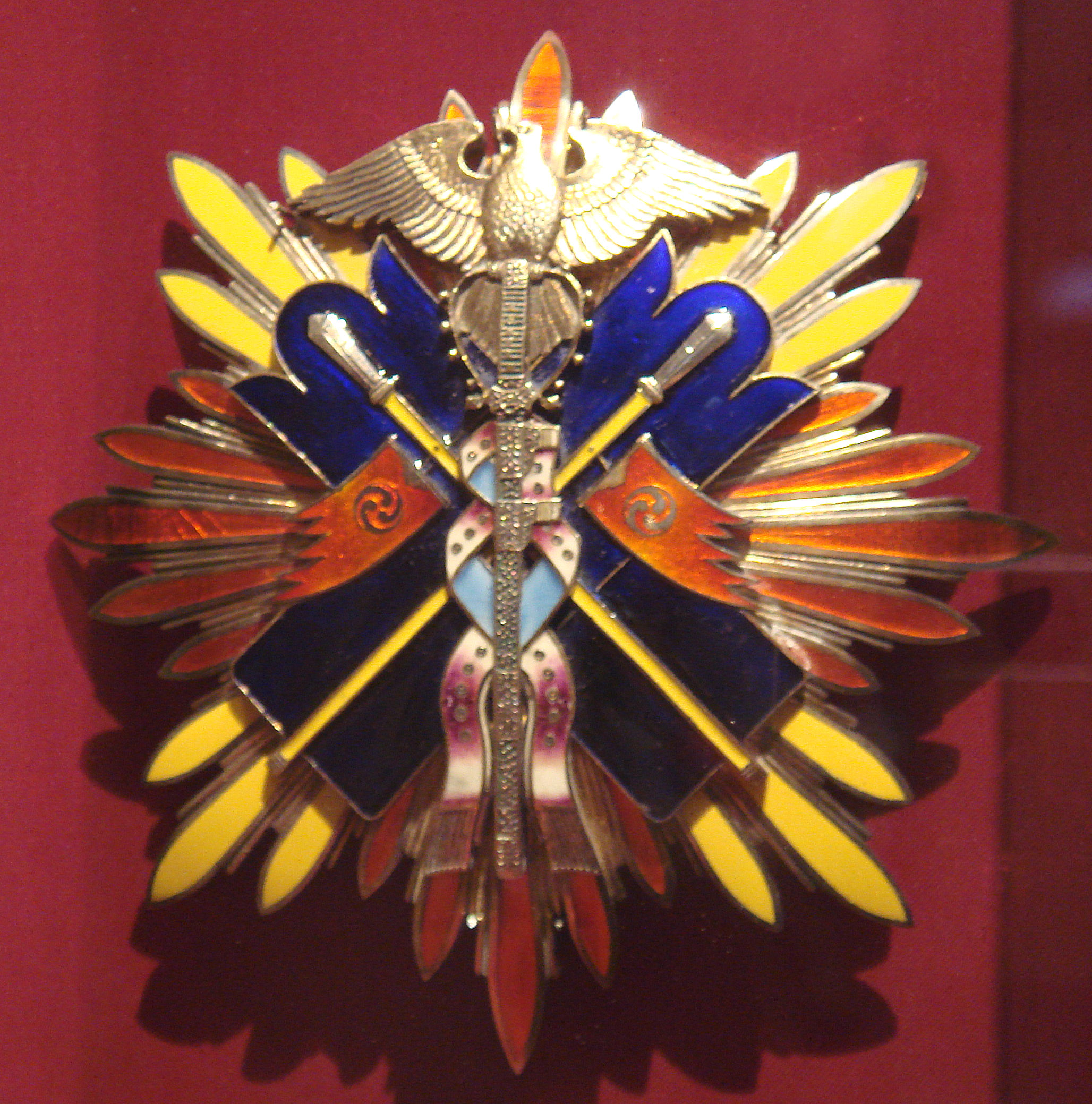
Order of the Golden Kite, 1st and 2nd class plaque

The badge depicts a golden kite, a messenger of the kami as described in the ancient Japanese chronicle Nihon Shoki, which helped Emperor Jimmu defeat his enemies in battle. The Nihon Shoki tells of a kinki ("golden kite") that landed on Jimmu's bow and emitted rays of dazzling light that blinded his enemies. The golden kite stands on an eight-pointed star with 32 rays enameled in red. Below the kite are two crossed ancient shields, enameled blue, with two crossed spears with silver heads enameled yellow with red banners each bearing a mitsudomoe. On one side is a chokutō (enameled green with white trappings). The reverse side is plain.

The badge was a gilt starburst for the 1st-5th classes and different design in gilt for the 6th class and in silver for the 7th class. It was suspended on a ribbon in blue-green with a white stripe near the edges, worn as a sash on the left shoulder by the 1st class, as a necklet by the 2nd and 3rd classes, on the left chest by the 4th and 5th classes. The badges for 6th and 7th classes were non-enameled.

The star of the 1st and 2nd classes was similar to the badge as described above, but with both red and yellow enameled rays. It was worn on the left chest by the 1st class, on the right chest by the 2nd class.

== Selected recipients ==
=== First Class ===
Imperial Japanese Army

- Prince Kan'in Kotohito (1865–1945)
- Prince Asaka Yasuhiko (1887–1981)
- Yamagata Aritomo (1838–1922)
- Nozu Michitsura (1840–1908)
- Ōyama Iwao (1842–1916)
- Kuroki Tamemoto (1844–1923)
- Oku Yasukata (1847–1930)
- Nogi Maresuke (1849–1912).
- Kawamura Kageaki (1850–1926)
- Hasegawa Yoshimichi (1850–1924)
- Terauchi Masatake (1852–1919)
- Kodama Gentarō (1852–1906).
- Kamio Mitsuomi (1856–1927)
- Mutō Nobuyoshi (1868–1933)
- Honjō Shigeru (1876–1945)
- Matsui Iwane (1878–1948)
- Hata Shunroku (1879–1962)
- Terauchi Hisaichi (1879–1946)
- Sugiyama Hajime (1880–1945)
- Nishio Toshizō (1881–1960)
- Okamura Yasuji (1884–1966)
- Yamashita Tomoyuki (1885–1946)

Imperial Japanese Navy

- Prince Fushimi Hiroyasu (1875–1946)
- Tōgō Heihachirō (1848–1934)
- Itō Sukeyuki (1843–1914)
- Kamimura Hikonojō (1849–1916)
- Ijuin Gorō (1852–1921)
- Yamamoto Gonnohyōe (1852–1933)
- Kataoka Shichirō (1854–1920)
- Suzuki Kantarō (1868–1948)
- Yonai Mitsumasa (1880–1948)
- Oikawa Koshirō (1883–1958)
- Hasegawa Kiyoshi (1883–1970)
- Yamamoto Isoroku (1884–1943)
- Nagumo Chūichi (1887–1944)
- Koga Mineichi (1885–1944)
- Yamaguchi Tamon (1892–1942)
- Arima Masafumi (1895–1944)

=== Second Class ===
Imperial Japanese Army

- Prince Komatsu Akihito (1846–1903)
- Prince Fushimi Sadanaru (1858–1923)
- Yamaguchi Motomi (1846–1904)
- Kawakami Soroku (1848–1899)
- Ōshima Yoshimasa (1850–1926)
- Fukushima Yasumasa (1852–1919)
- Andō Sadayoshi (1853–1932)
- Umezawa Michiharu (1853–1924).
- Ishimoto Shinroku (1854–1912)
- Uehara Yūsaku (1856–1933)
- Nagaoka Gaishi (1858–1933)
- Akiyama Yoshifuru (1859–1930)
- Yamanashi Hanzō (1864–1944)
- Shirakawa Yoshinori (1869–1932)
- Araki Sadao (1877–1966)
- Nakajima Kesago (1881–1945)
- Tada Hayao (1882–1948)
- Andō Rikichi (1884–1946)
- Tojo Hideki (1884–1948)
- Ushiroku Jun (1884–1973)
- Isogai Rensuke (1886–1967)
- Katō Tateo (1903–1942).

Imperial Japanese Navy

- Kabayama Sukenori (1837–1922)
- Saigō Jūdō (1843–1902)
- Inoue Yoshika (1845–1929)
- Hidaka Sōnojō (1848–1932)
- Dewa Shigetō (1856–1930)
- Uryū Sotokichi (1857–1937)
- Saito Makoto (1858–1936)
- Katō Tomosaburō (1861–1923)
- Nomura Kichisaburō (1877–1964)
- Shimada Shigetarō (1883–1976)
- Takagi Takeo (1892–1944).

=== Third Class ===
Imperial Japanese Army

- Emperor Taishō (1879–1926)
- Prince Kitashirakawa Yoshihisa (1847–1895)
- Prince Chichibu (1902–1953)
- Katsura Taro (1848–1913)
- Tanaka Giichi (1864–1929)
- Yamaji Motoharu (1841–1897)
- Kusunose Yukihiko (1858–1927)
- Ōshima Ken'ichi (1858–1947)
- Tachibana Koichirō (1861–1929)
- Mori Ōgai (1862–1922)
- Akashi Motojiro (1864–1919)
- Ueda Kenkichi (1875–1962)
- Yamawaki Masataka (1886–1974)
- Ishiwara Kanji (1889–1949)
- Tanaka Ryūkichi (1893–1972)

Imperial Japanese Navy

- Prince Arisugawa Takehito (1862–1913)
- Prince Higashifushimi Yorihito (1867–1922)
- Prince Kuni Asaakira (1901–1959)
- Tsuboi Kōzō (1843–1898)
- Taketomi Kunikane (1852–1931)
- Yashiro Rokurō (1860–1930)
- Yamashita Gentarō (1863–1931)
- Satō Tetsutarō (1866–1942)
- Takarabe Takeshi (1867–1949)
- Okada Keisuke (1868–1952)
- Eto Kyōsuke (1881–1917)
- Nomura Naokuni (1885–1973)

=== Fourth Class ===
Imperial Japanese Army

- Prince Kuni Kuniyoshi (1873–1929)
- Prince Nashimoto Morimasa (1874–1951)
- Prince Kan'in Haruhito (1902–1988)
- Prince Kitashirakawa Nagahisa (1910–1940)
- Ugaki Kazushige (1868–1956)
- Minami Jirō (1874–1955)
- Fukuda Hikosuke (1875–1959)
- Hayashi Senjūrō (1876–1943)
- Masaki Jinzaburō (1876–1956)
- Koiso Kuniaki (1880–1950)
- Ishii Shirō (1892–1959).

Imperial Japanese Navy

- Prince Yamashina Kikumaro (1873–1908)
- Prince Takamatsu (1905–1987)
- Tochiuchi Sōjirō (1866–1932)
- Ogasawara Naganari (1867–1958)
- Matsumura Tatsuo (1868–1932)
- Abo Kiyokazu (1870–1948)
- Hyakutake Saburō (1872–1963)

=== Fifth Class ===
Imperial Japanese Army

- Prince Takeda Tsunehisa (1883–1919)
- Hishikari Takashi (1871–1952)
- Kawashima Yoshiyuki (1878–1945)
- Katsuki Kiyoshi (1881–1950)
- Ōba Sakae (1914–1992)
- Tsuji Masanobu (1902–1961).

Imperial Japanese Navy

- Ōsumi Mineo (1876–1941)
- Kobayashi Seizō (1877–1962)
- Matsudaira Morio (1878–1944)
- Nishida Yoshimi (1892–1944)
- Fushimi Hirohide (1912–1943)
- Iwamoto Tetsuzō (1916–1955)

== See also ==
- Kite (bird)—raptor referenced in Imperial war decoration
