= Ōshima Ken'ichi =

Japanese politician (1858–1947)

Junior Second Rank Ōshima Ken'ichi
- 大島 健一
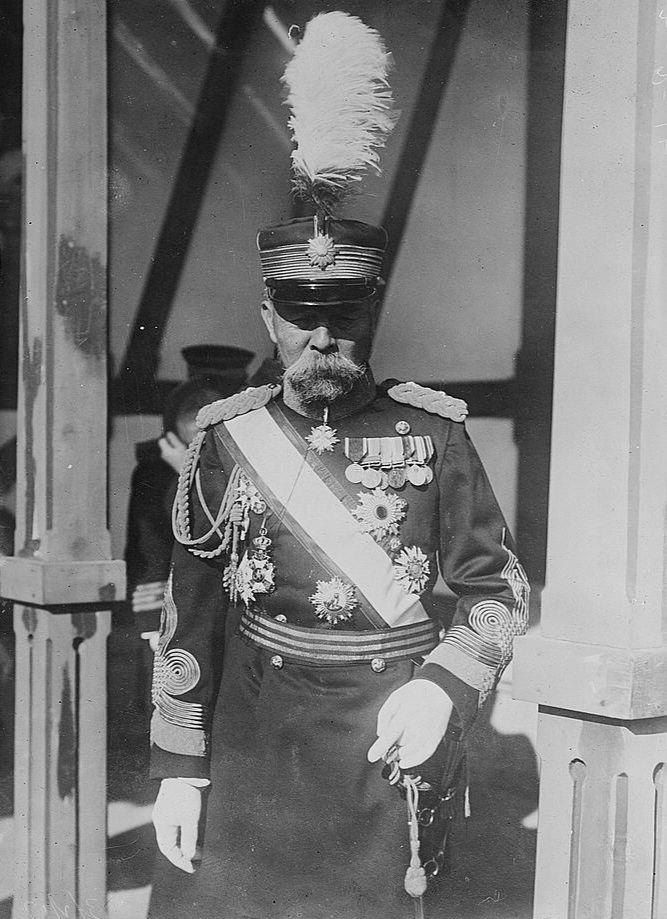
- Ken'ichi in 1917

Minister of the Army
- In office 30 March 1916 – 29 September 1918
- Prime Minister: Ōkuma Shigenobu; Terauchi Masatake
- Preceded by: Oka Ichinosuke
- Succeeded by: Tanaka Giichi

Member of the Privy Council
- In office 17 April 1940 – 17 April 1946
- Monarch: Hirohito

Member of the House of Peers
- In office 2 June 1920 – 24 April 1940 Nominated by the Emperor

Personal details
- Born: 19 June 1858 Iwamura, Mino, Japan
- Died: 24 March 1947 (aged 88) Chigasaki, Kanagawa, Japan
- Resting place: Tama Cemetery
- Children: Hiroshi Ōshima

Military service
- Allegiance: Empire of Japan
- Branch/service: Imperial Japanese Army
- Years of service: 1881–1916
- Rank: Lieutenant General
- Battles/wars: First Sino-Japanese War; Russo-Japanese War

Ōshima Ken'ichi (大島 健一; 19 June 1858 – 24 March 1947) was a general in the Imperial Japanese Army and Army Minister during World War I. His son, Hiroshi Ōshima was a lieutenant general in the Imperial Japanese Army, and served as Japanese ambassador to Nazi Germany.

== Biography ==
Ōshima was born in Iwamura Domain, Mino Province (currently part of Ena City in Gifu Prefecture) as the son of a samurai household. He graduated from the 4th class of the Imperial Japanese Army Academy in 1881, where he specialized in artillery and was sent overseas as a military attaché and for studies to France and Prussia from 1891 to 1893.

Ōshima served on the staff of General Yamagata Aritomo during the Japanese First Army in First Sino-Japanese War. During the Russo-Japanese War, he served on the Imperial General Headquarters, and after the war held various administrative and staff positions within the Imperial Japanese Army General Staff. He was promoted to major general in 1907 and to lieutenant general in 1913.

From 30 April 1916 to 29 September 1918, Ōshima was Minister of War under Prime Ministers Ōkuma Shigenobu and Terauchi Masatake. He entered the reserves in 1919 and served as a member of the House of Peers in the Diet of Japan from 1920. From 1940 to 1946, he served as a member of the Privy Council.

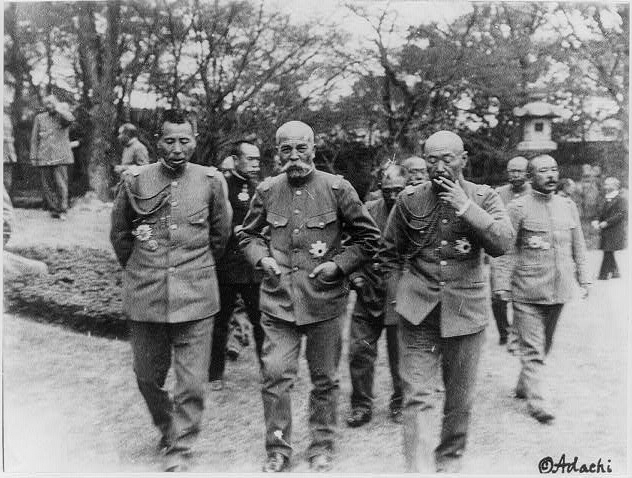
Ōshima (center) with Giichi Tanaka (left) and Uehara Yūsaku in 1918

== Decorations ==
- 1895 – Order of the Sacred Treasure, 6th class
- 1895 – Order of the Rising Sun, 6th class
- 1895 – Order of the Golden Kite, 5th class
- 1900 – Order of the Sacred Treasure, 5th class
- 1905 – Order of the Sacred Treasure, 4th class
- 1906 – Order of the Rising Sun, 3rd class
- 1908 – Order of the Golden Kite, 3rd class
- 1908 – Order of the Rising Sun, 2nd class
- 1916 – Grand Cordon of the Order of the Sacred Treasure
- 1916 – Grand Cordon of the Order of the Rising Sun
- 1920 – Order of the Rising Sun: Grand Cordon of the Paulownia Flowers
