= Yoshiyuki Kawashima =

Japanese general

- 川島 義之
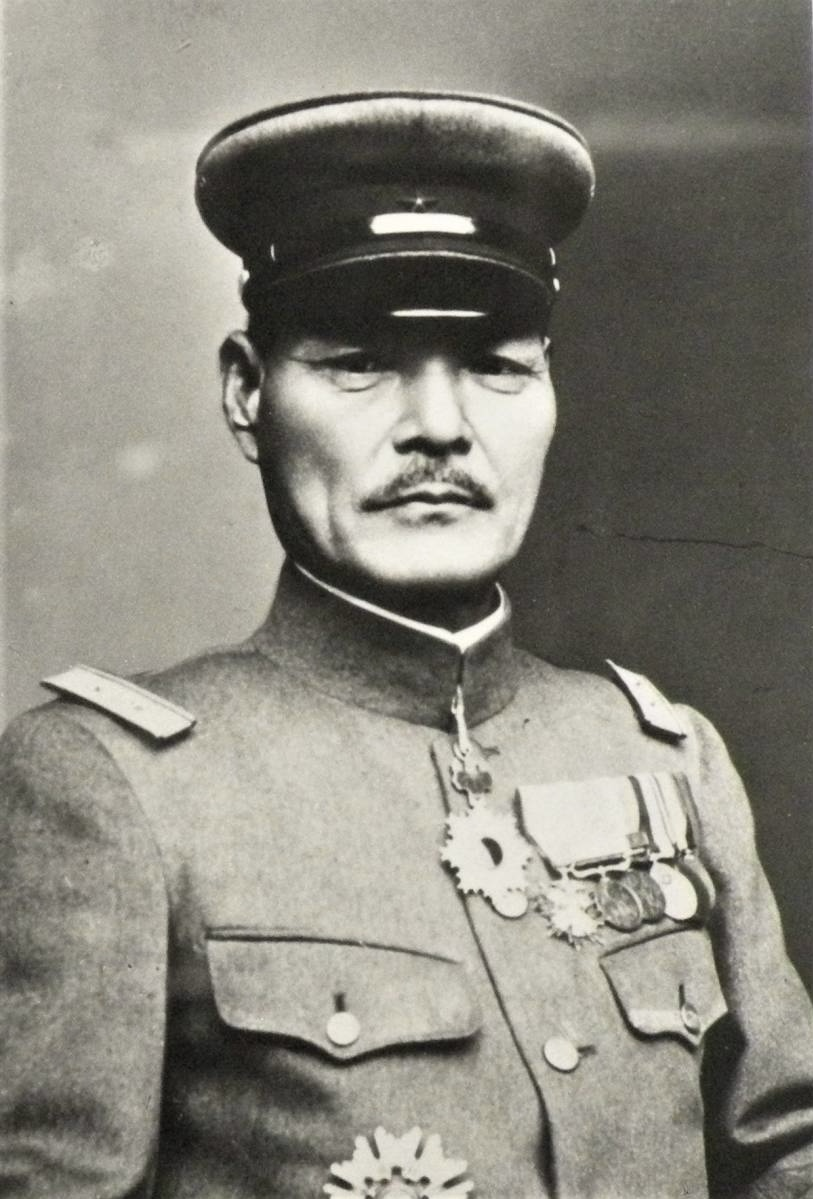

Minister of the Army
- In office 5 September 1935 – 9 March 1936
- Prime Minister: Keisuke Okada
- Preceded by: Senjūrō Hayashi
- Succeeded by: Hisaichi Terauchi

Member of the Supreme War Council
- In office 1 August 1934 – 5 September 1935
- Monarch: Hirohito

Personal details
- Born: 25 May 1878 Matsuyama, Ehime, Japan
- Died: 8 September 1945 (aged 67) Atami, Shizuoka, Japan

Military service
- Allegiance: Empire of Japan
- Branch/service: Imperial Japanese Army
- Years of service: 1898–1936
- Rank: General
- Commands: 19th Division; 3rd Division; Japanese Korean Army

Yoshiyuki Kawashima (川島 義之, Kawashima Yoshiyuki; 25 May 1878 – 8 September 1945) was a general in the Imperial Japanese Army and Army Minister in the 1930s.

== Biography ==
Kawashima was a native of Ehime prefecture. He graduated from the 10th class of the Imperial Japanese Army Academy in 1898 (where one of his classmates was Sadao Araki), and graduated with honors from the 20th class of the Army Staff College in 1908. He was sent as a military attaché to Germany from 1910-1913.

After serving in the strategy and planning department and as Chief of Personnel Bureau within the Imperial Japanese Army General Staff, Kawashima was assigned command of the 1st Guards Infantry Brigade. He was promoted to major general in 1923 and lieutenant general in 1927. Kawashima subsequently commanded the IJA 19th Division and the IJA 3rd Division.

After being appointed deputy commander of the Inspectorate General of Military Training in 1932, he served as commander of the Chosen Army in Korea from 1932–1934 and as a member of the Supreme War Council after his promotion to full general in 1934. Kawashima became Army Minister in 1935, but was forced into retirement due to implications of his involvement with the attempted coup plotters of the February 26th Incident of 1936.

Kawashima died shortly after the end of World War II on 8 September 1945.

== Notes ==
Political offices
Preceded by Senjuro Hayashi	Army Minister; 5 September 1935 – 9 March 1936	Succeeded by Hisaichi Terauchi
Military offices
Preceded by Senjuro Hayashi	IJA Chosen Army; May 1932 – Aug 1934	Succeeded by Kenkichi Ueda
