= Hiroshi Ōshima =

General in the Imperial Japanese Army

- 大島 浩
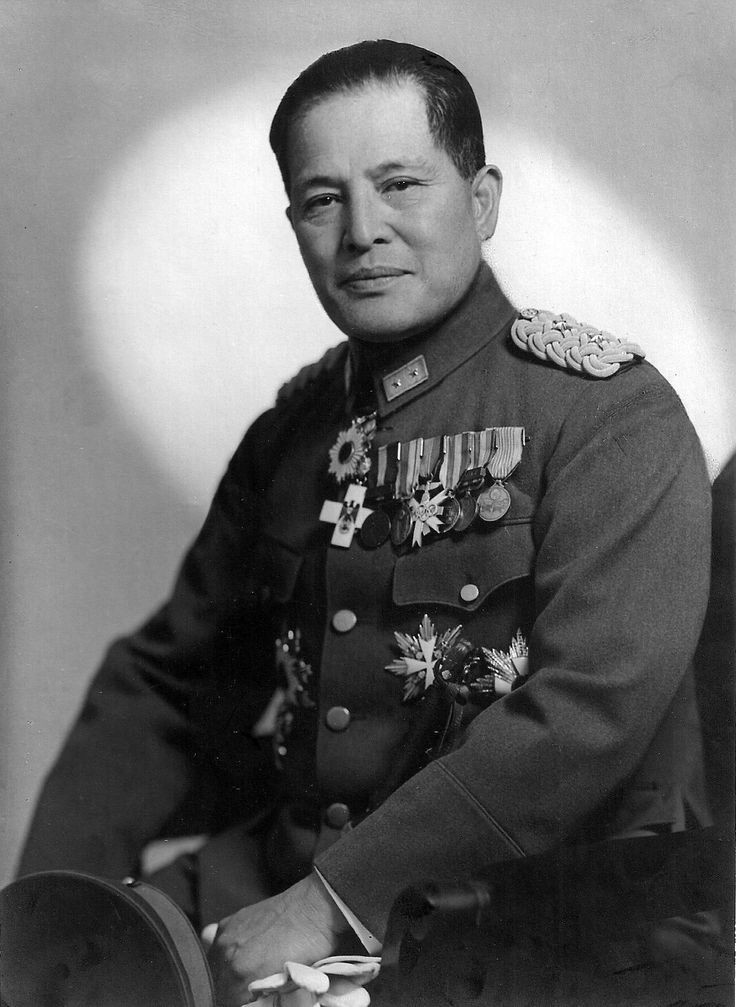
- Born: April 19, 1886; Nagoya, Aichi, Japan
- Died: June 6, 1975 (aged 89); Chigasaki, Kanagawa, Japan
- Spouse: Toyoko Oshima
- Military career
- Allegiance: Empire of Japan
- Branch: Imperial Japanese Army
- Service years: 1906–1945
- Rank: Lieutenant General
- Conflicts: Siberian Intervention; World War II
- Awards: Order of the Rising Sun (1st class); Order of the German Eagle (1st class)
- Other work: Ambassador Extraordinary and Plenipotentiary of Japan to the German Reich; Envoy Extraordinary and Minister Plenipotentiary of Japan to the Independent State of Croatia, the Kingdom of Hungary, and the Slovak Republic

Hiroshi Ōshima (大島 浩, Ōshima Hiroshi; April 19, 1886 – June 6, 1975) was a general in the Imperial Japanese Army, Japanese ambassador to Germany before and during World War II and (unwittingly) a major source of communications intelligence for the Allies. His role was perhaps best summed up by General George C. Marshall, who identified Ōshima as "our main basis of information regarding Hitler's intentions in Europe". After World War II, he was convicted of war crimes and sentenced to life imprisonment, but was paroled in 1955.

== Biography ==
=== Early life ===
Ōshima was the son of a provincial low ranking samurai family from Gifu Prefecture. His father, Ōshima Ken'ichi (大島 健一, Ōshima Ken'ichi), rose up through the ranks and eventually served as Army Minister from 1916 to 1918. Much was expected of the young Ōshima and his rise in the Imperial Army structure was swift. He graduated from the Imperial Japanese Army Academy in June 1905, a member of the academy's 18th class, and was promoted to second lieutenant in June 1906 and to lieutenant in June 1908. He graduated as a member of the 27th Army War College class in May 1915 and was promoted to captain the following year.

From 1918 to 1919, he served in Siberia with the Japanese expeditionary forces and was appointed assistant military attaché in the Japanese embassy to the Weimar Republic. Promoted to major in January 1922, he served as a military attaché in Budapest and Vienna in 1923 and 1924. After his return to Japan, he was promoted to lieutenant colonel in August 1926. Following a promotion to colonel in August 1930, he served as commander of the 10th Field Artillery Regiment from 1930 to 1931.

=== Military and diplomatic career ===
In 1934, Colonel Ōshima became Japanese military attaché in Berlin. Described as "more German than a German", he spoke the language almost perfectly, and was soon befriended by Joachim von Ribbentrop, then Adolf Hitler's favourite foreign policy advisor. Although Hitler ostensibly used the Foreign Ministry (Auswärtiges Amt) for his foreign relations, he was actually more dependent on the Dienststelle Ribbentrop, a competing foreign office operated by the ex-champagne salesman.

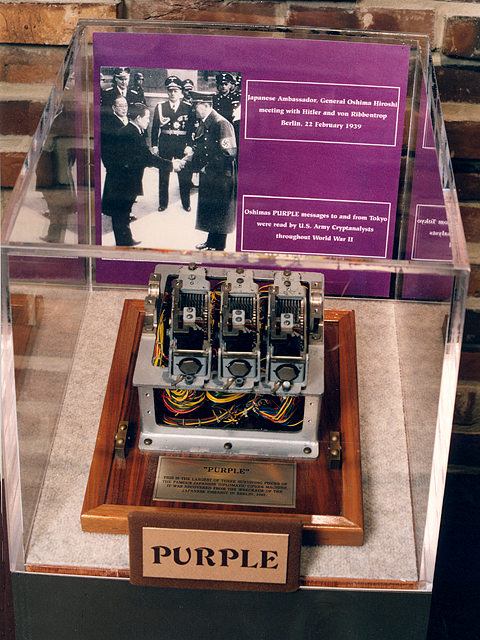
Fragment of an actual Purple machine from the Japanese embassy in Berlin, obtained by the United States at the end of World War II. The photograph in the display shows Ōshima shaking hands with Hitler. Ribbentrop stands in the middle.

Ōshima was promoted to major general in March 1935. Under Ribbentrop's guidance, Ōshima met privately with Hitler that fall. With the support of the Nazi leadership and the Imperial Japanese Army General Staff, Ōshima progressed rapidly while in Berlin. He attained the rank of lieutenant general and was appointed ambassador to Germany in October 1938. He then transferred to the army reserve. During his early months as ambassador, according to evidence presented later at the Nürnberg Trial of Major War Criminals, he plotted the assassination of Joseph Stalin by Russian agents sympathetic to his cause. In a conversation that Ōshima had with Heinrich Himmler on 31 January 1939, the former expressed the hope that German-Japanese co-operation in the field of intelligence would lead eventually to the disintegration of the Soviet Union. Ōshima was instrumental in the forging and signing of the Anti-Comintern Pact on 25 November 1936 and the Tripartite Pact on 27 September 1940.

However, on August 25, 1939, the German government decided to conclude the Molotov–Ribbentrop Pact and to suspend negotiations on a Japan-German alliance and defense agreement. This caused great turmoil in the Japanese government, contributing to the collapse of the Hiranuma Cabinet. Ōshima was recalled to Japan (with Saburō Kurusu succeeding him) to take responsibility in September 1939, and was dismissed as an ambassador on December 27.

Ōshima's importance for Hitler can be seen in the fact that after the conclusion of the Anti-Comintern Pact, the US Ambassador in Japan, Joseph Grew, estimated that the agreement was mainly the result of Ōshima's work, without the participation of the Japanese Ministry of Foreign Affairs. At the insistence of the Nazi government, he returned to Berlin as ambassador in February 1941, and remained in that position until the German surrender in May 1945. He dedicated his efforts to closer relations between the two countries. This including military cooperation in the Indian Ocean area (in the form of anti-merchant submarine warfare). Such was his fanatical belief in Nazi ideology that American journalist William L. Shirer, in The Rise and Fall of the Third Reich, wrote that Ōshima was "more Nazi than the Nazis."

Ōshima's close relationship with Hitler and Ribbentrop gave him unparalleled access, for a foreigner, to German war plans and national policy, comparable to that of Winston Churchill with the American war leadership. In turn, Hitler admired the militaristic Japanese and made Ōshima a personal confidant.

Ōshima made visits to the Eastern Front and the Atlantic Wall, and he met periodically with Hitler and other Nazi leaders. Being a meticulous military officer in training, he wrote detailed reports of the information provided to him by the Nazis. The reports were sent by radio to Tokyo in the Purple diplomatic cipher. Unbeknownst to the Japanese, the Purple cipher had been broken by American codebreakers in 1940. Thus, Oshima's reports were read almost simultaneously by his superiors in Japan and by Allied leaders and analysts as "Magic" intelligence. Sometimes, the Allies read the reports before the Japanese did, as transmission problems between Germany and Japan often held up the reports for hours. Ōshima was interviewed in 1959 and asked about the security of his transmissions. He said that he had been warned in 1941 by Heinrich Georg Stahmer that there were signs that Japanese diplomatic messages were being read by the Allies, but that he was convinced that, by double-encrypting his dispatches, he had ensured they could not be decrypted by the Allies. He died before the Allied decryption of Purple messages became common knowledge and so never knew that he had unwittingly provided the Allies with priceless intelligence.

=== Pacific War ===
On 12 February 1941, Ōshima discussed the possibility of a joint German-Japanese initiative for war against the British Empire and the United States with Ribbentrop, agreeing with him the time was ripe to strike at the British Empire in Asia. On 23 February 1941, Ribbentrop urged him to press the Japanese government to attack British possessions in East Asia. On 28 November 1941, in a conversation with German Foreign Minister, Ōshima was given an assurance that the Third Reich would join the Japanese government in case of war against the United States.

Such was Hitler's high esteem that Ōshima was one of only 15 recipients of the Grand Cross of the Order of the German Eagle in Gold. Hitler awarded the medal following the attack on Pearl Harbor in 1941. The award ceremony was attended by Reich Foreign Minister Ribbentrop and the secret notes of the conference were revealed at the Nuremberg trials in 1945. In addressing Ōshima, Hitler reportedly said:

You gave the right declaration of war. This method is the only proper one. Japan pursued it formerly and it corresponds with his own system, that is, to negotiate as long as possible. But if one sees that the other is interested only in putting one off, in shaming and humiliating one, and is not willing to come to an agreement, then one should strike as hard as possible, and not waste time declaring war.

=== Germany presses for Japanese attack on Soviets ===
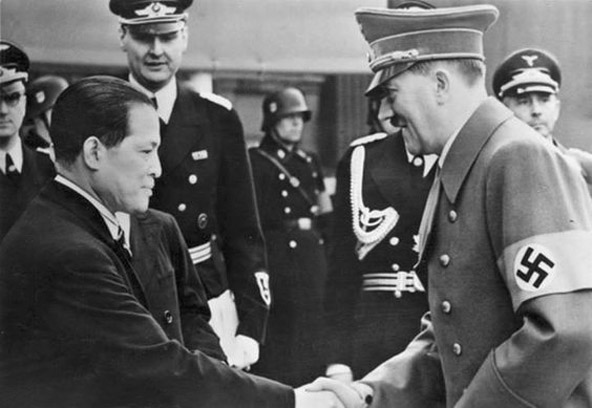
Adolf Hitler meeting with Hiroshi Ōshima

Despite Ōshima's anti-Soviet positions, the Japanese government in April 1941 concluded a non-aggression pact with Moscow. The German armed forces invaded the Soviet Union in June and the German government was interested in a simultaneous Japanese attack on the USSR. However, prior to the invasion itself, the German government had not updated Ōshima about plans of attack. In a conversation held on 17 May 1941, Ernst von Weizsäcker, State Secretary in the German Foreign Office, denied that there was any tension with the Soviet government.

Following the invasion of the Soviet Union on 22 June 1941, pressure was placed on the Japanese government to join the invasion. On 9 July 1942, Ribbentrop tried to convince Ōshima to urge his government to join the attack on the Soviet Union. Ribbentrop's main argument being that "never again would Japan have such an opportunity as existed at present to eliminate once and for all the Russian colossus in eastern Asia". On 6 March 1943, Ōshima delivered Ribbentrop the following official statement from the Japanese government:

The Japanese Government absolutely recognize the danger which threatens from Russia and completely understand the desire of their German ally that Japan on her part will also enter the war against Russia. However, it is not possible for the Japanese Government, considering the present war situation, to enter into the war. They are rather of the conviction that it would be in the common interest not to start the war against Russia now. On the other hand, the Japanese Government would never disregard the Russian question.

=== Supporting war crimes ===
Ōshima's high esteem with Hitler made him privy to some of the planning relating to actions later to be defined as war crimes and atrocities. One example was a meeting held between Ōshima and Hitler on 3 January 1942, where they both agreed on the action of sinking life-boats working for the rescue of Allied naval personnel fleeing ships sunk in military action. The official text reads:

the Führer pointed out that, however many ships the United States built, one of their main problems would be the lack of personnel. For that reason even merchant ships would be sunk without warning with the intention of killing as many of the crew as possible. Once it gets around that most of the seamen are lost in the sinkings, the Americans would soon have difficulties in enlisting new people. The training of sea-going personnel takes a very long time. We are fighting for our existence and our attitude cannot be ruled by any humane feelings. For this reason he must give the order that in case foreign seamen could not be taken prisoner, which is in most cases not possible on the sea, U-boats were to surface after torpedoing and shoot up the Lifeboats. Ambassador Ōshima heartily agreed with the Führer's comments, and said, "that the Japanese, too, are forced to follow these methods" .

At a meeting that Ōshima had on 25 May 1944 with Hitler and Ribbentrop, Hitler advised that the Japanese government should publicly hang every captured US pilot who was involved in air raids in hope of deterring further such attacks.

Oshima was later charged and found guilty for the part he played for the forging and signing of the Anti-Comintern Pact and the Tripartite Pact, which were, in the eyes of the Allies, part of the conspiracy to wage aggressive war.

=== Intercepted dispatches ===
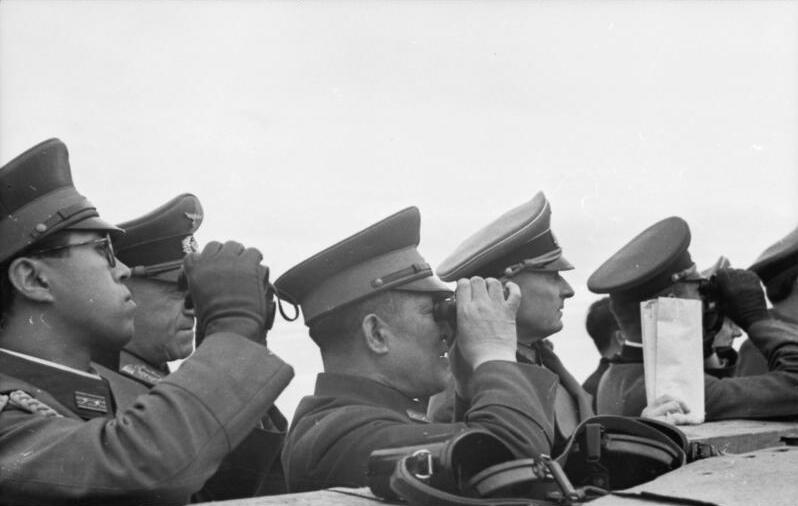
Ōshima (center) touring the Atlantic Wall with other Japanese and German officials in 1943

Virtually all of Ōshima's dispatches as ambassador were intercepted: approximately 72 during the last 11 months of 1941, some 103 in 1942, 400 in 1943, 600 in 1944, and about 300 during the just over four months of 1945 when Germany was at war. For example, in a dispatch decoded on 19 January 1942, Ribbentrop agreed to supply daily intelligence reports to Ōshima, which he could pass on to Tokyo. He warned that "any leakage of these reports due to our fault would be of grave consequence, so all the handling of these reports should be strictly secret." This despite the fact that the Germans often reproached him of the unreliability of the Japanese codes, although Ōshima assured them of its security. This laxity proved to be fatal to Japanese espionage efforts, as even much of the intelligence gathered by the Japanese spy network codenamed TO in Spain (with implicit support given by the Spanish authorities) was channelled through him. This evidence halted the loading of petroleum by the United States onto Spanish tankers in 1944.

While some of his predictions were wrong (Ōshima predicted that Britain would surrender to Germany before the end of 1941), his reporting of the Nazi leadership's plans and policies and his factual data were invaluable to the Allies. For example, on 6 June 1941, he advised Tokyo that Germany would invade the Soviet Union on 22 June (see Operation Barbarossa).

Another example was in November 1943, when Ōshima was taken on a four-day tour of the Atlantic Wall fortifications on the coast of France. Upon his return to Berlin, he wrote a detailed 20-page report of his visit, giving an account of the location of every German division and its manpower and weaponry. He described tank ditches in detail, armament of turrets located close to the shore, and available mobile forces. That provided valuable intelligence to the planners of the D-Day assault. Connected to that was that the Allies knew that Operation Fortitude was working because just one week before D-Day, Hitler confided to Ōshima that while the Allies might make diversionary feints in Norway, Brittany and Normandy, they will actually open up "an all-out second front in the area of the Straits of Dover." Thus, Ōshima dutifully reported that the bulk of German forces would not be waiting in Normandy but, mistakenly, at the Pas-de-Calais area.

His dispatches also proved to be valuable to those involved in the bombing campaign in Europe, as Ōshima provided details on the effect of Allied bombing raids on specific German targets, giving valuable and relatively unbiased bomb damage assessments to the Allies.

=== During and after the war ===
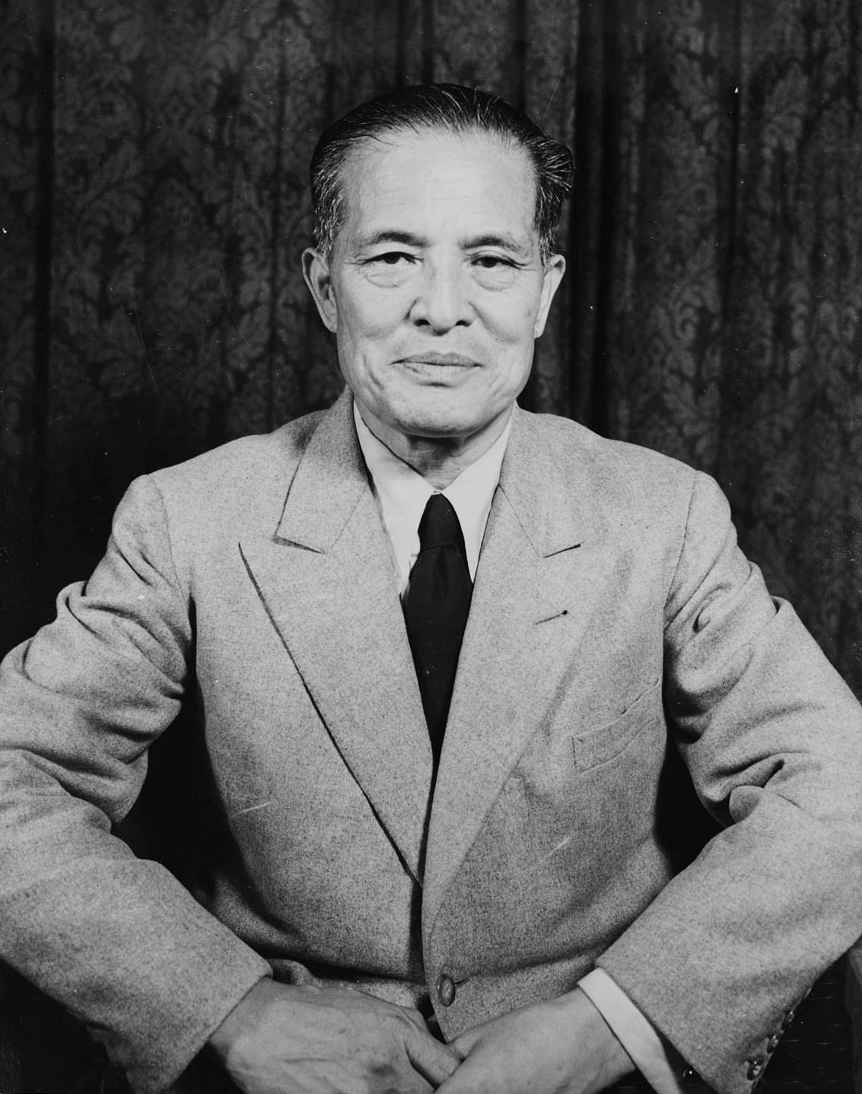
Ōshima in 1947

As the war progressed and Germany began to retreat, Ōshima never wavered in his confidence that Germany would emerge victorious. However, in March 1945, he reported to Tokyo on the "danger of Berlin becoming a battlefield" and revealing a fear "that the abandonment of Berlin may take place in another month." On 13 April 1945, he met with Ribbentrop (for the last time, it turned out) and vowed to stand with the leaders of the Third Reich in their hour of crisis. "I do not wish to be treated in the same manner as other diplomats merely by reason of great danger from the ravages of war," he proclaimed, but he was informed that evening by the Foreign Ministry's chief of protocol: all diplomats were to leave Berlin at once by Hitler's direct order. Ōshima subsequently accepted that order then sent his wife to Bad Gastein, a mountain resort in Austria, and, the next day, left to join her, together with most of the Japanese diplomatic staff.

Less than a month later, Germany surrendered and Ōshima and the rest of remaining his staff were taken into custody. They were then taken from Austria to the United States by ship, arriving on 11 July 1945. After interrogation and internment in Bedford Springs Hotel, a resort hotel in the heart of the Allegheny Mountains, Pennsylvania, Ōshima was returned to Japan in November 1945.

Although he briefly enjoyed freedom in his devastated country, he was arrested on 16 December 1945 and charged with war crimes. He initially denied ever being close to Hitler and Ribbentrop. When brought before the International Military Tribunal for the Far East, he was found guilty of conspiring to wage aggressive war on 12 November 1948 and sentenced to life imprisonment. Ōshima was paroled in late 1955 and granted clemency three years later.

After his release, Ōshima lived in seclusion in Chigasaki, Kanagawa, refusing invitations from the ruling Liberal Democratic Party to enter into politics, in stark contrast to Kichisaburō Nomura, who was Japanese ambassador to the United States at the outbreak of World War II and who ran, was elected, and served several terms in the Diet after the war besides active public and private life.

Ōshima died in 1975, not knowing that he provided the Allies with invaluable intelligence during the war.

== Decorations ==
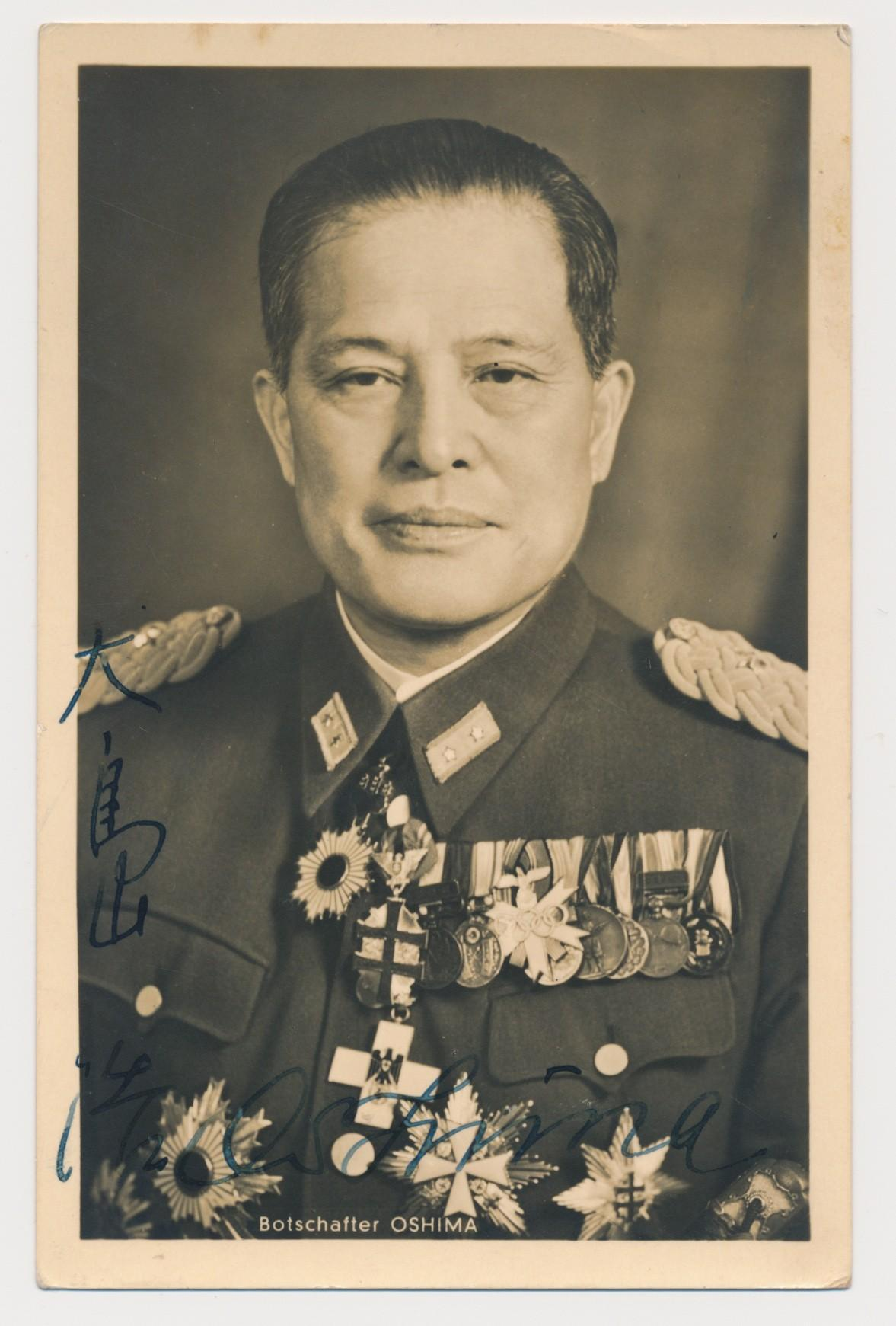
Ōshima with decorations

- 1938 – Order of the Sacred Treasure, 2nd class
- 1940 – Grand Cordon of the Order of the Rising Sun
- 1940 – Grand Cross of the Order of Merit of the German Eagle in Gold with Star
- The Slovak Order of the Military Victory Cross
- The German Olympic Decoration 2nd class
- The 1914–1920 Siberian Intervention Medal
- The Taisho Enthronement Commemorative Medal
- The Inter Allied Victory Medal
- The 1931–34 China Incident War Medal
- The Manchukuo National Foundation Medal
- The 2600th National Anniversary Commemorative Medal 1940
- The Showa Enthronement Commemorative Medal

== See also ==
- German-Japanese relations
- List of Japanese ministers, envoys and ambassadors to Germany
