= Hasegawa Yoshimichi =

Japanese general (1850–1924)

Junior First Rank Marshal Count Hasegawa Yoshimichi
- 長谷川 好道
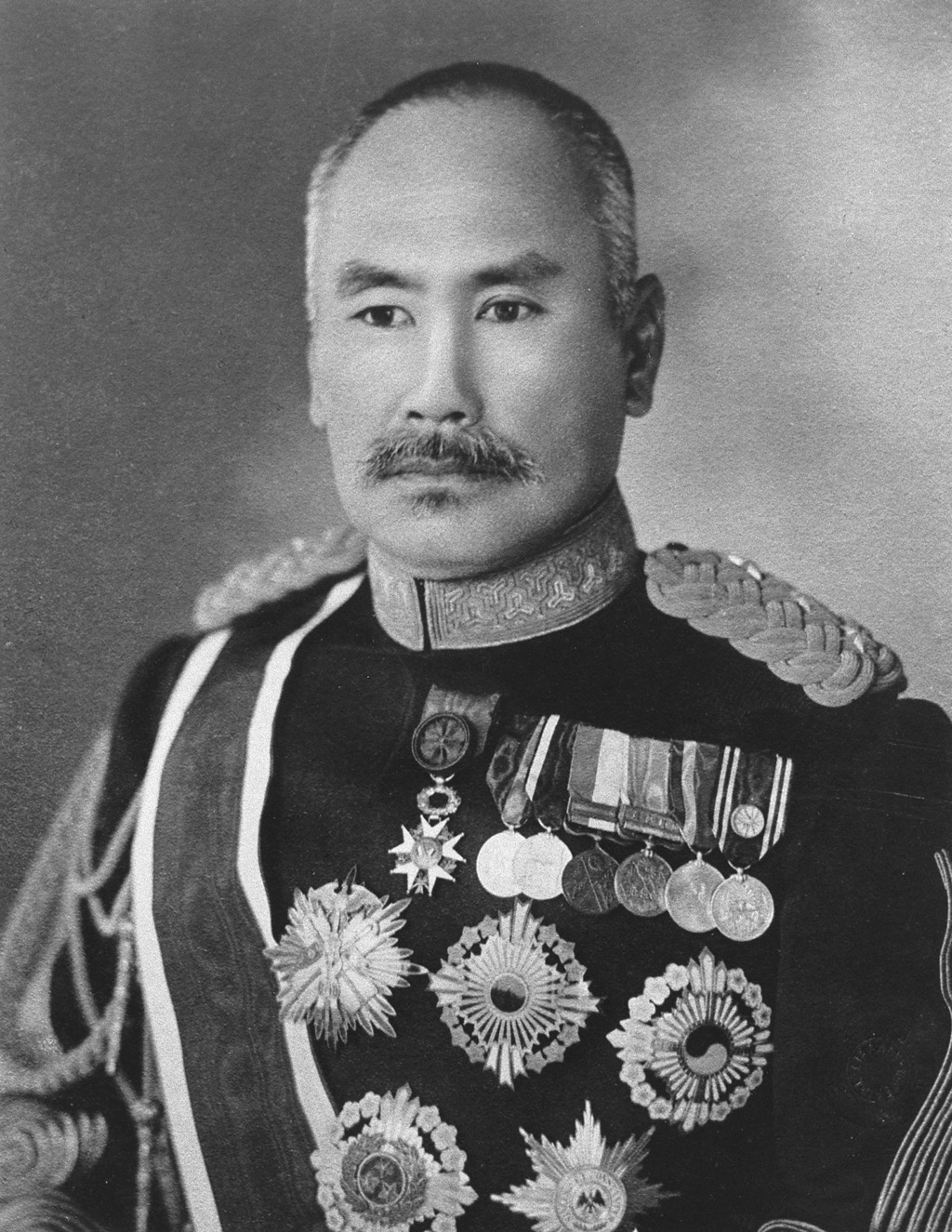

Governor-General of Korea
- In office 16 October 1916 – 12 August 1919
- Monarch: Taishō
- Preceded by: Terauchi Masatake
- Succeeded by: Saitō Makoto

Chief of the Imperial Japanese Army General Staff Office
- In office 20 January 1912 – 17 December 1915
- Monarchs: Meiji; Taishō
- Preceded by: Oku Yasukata
- Succeeded by: Uehara Yūsaku

Personal details
- Born: 1 October 1850 Suō, Japan
- Died: 27 January 1924 (aged 73) Shinjuku, Tokyo, Japan
- Resting place: Aoyama Cemetery
- Awards: Order of the Golden Kite (1st class); Order of the Chrysanthemum; Order of the Red Eagle; Order of the Golden Ruler of the Korean Empire; Order of the Auspicious Stars of the Korean Empire

Military service
- Allegiance: Empire of Japan
- Branch/service: Imperial Japanese Army
- Years of service: 1871–1916
- Rank: Field Marshal
- Battles/wars: Boshin War; First Sino-Japanese War; Russo-Japanese War

Marshal Count Hasegawa Yoshimichi (長谷川 好道; 1 October 1850 – 27 January 1924) was a field marshal in the Imperial Japanese Army and Japanese Governor General of Korea from 1916 to 1919. His Japanese decorations included Order of the Golden Kite (1st class) and Order of the Chrysanthemum.

== Early life ==
Hasegawa Yoshimichi was born in Suō, Yamaguchi, Japan, on 1 October 1850. His father was a samurai and member of the Iwakuni Clan. He entered the Osaka Army Academy in 1870, and was promoted to captain in 1871.

== Career ==
Hasegawa fought in the Boshin War and Satsuma Rebellion. Hasegawa led the 12th Infantry Brigade during the Second Sino-Japanese War. He led a division of the Imperial Guard during the Russo-Japanese War.

Hasegawa was promoted to general in 1904, and became chief of the Imperial Japanese Army General Staff Office in 1912. As chief of staff he forced Minister of the Army Uehara Yūsaku to resign. He was promoted to field marshal in 1915, and made a hakushaku in 1916.

=== Korea ===
Hasegawa was the command general of Japanese forces in Korea from September 1904 to December 1908. He was one of the people responsible for forcing Gojong of Korea to abdicate as emperor of Korea in favour of his son Sunjong of Korea in 1907. It was rumoured that Hasegawa was responsible for the death of Gojong of Korea in 1919.

Hasegawa replaced Terauchi Masatake as Governor-General of Chōsen in 1916.

Prime Minister Hara Takashi discussions in his cabinet on replacing Hasegawa in 1919, and wanted other reforms in Korea such as equality for both Koreans and Japanese in education and the abolition of the gendarmerie system. Saitō Makoto replaced Hasegawa after the March First Movement. The cabinet agreed to Saitō's appointment on 4 August, and it was approved by Emperor Taishō on 12 August.

== Death ==
Hasegawa died on 27 January 1924. He was buried in the Aoyama Cemetery.

== Works cited ==
=== Books ===
- Buswell, Robert; Lee, Timothy, eds. (2006). Christianity in Korea. University of Hawaiʻi Press. ISBN 9780824829124.
- Cha, Victor; Pardo, Ramon (2023). Korea: A New History of South and North. Yale University Press. ISBN 9780300271287.

=== Journals ===
- Ch'oe, Yŏng-ho; Yi, Tae-jin (2011). "The Mystery of Emperor Kojong's Sudden Death in 1919: Were the Highest Japanese Officials Responsible?". Korean Studies. 35. University of Hawaiʻi Press: 122–151. doi:10.2307/23719458. JSTOR 23719458.
- Devine, Richard (1997). "Japanese Rule in Korea after the March First Uprising. Governor General Hasegawa's Recommendations". Monumenta Nipponica. 52 (4). Sophia University: 523–540. doi:10.2307/2385698. JSTOR 2385698.
- Kim, Daniel (2022). "Refashioning Femininity in Colonial Korea: Kang Hyang-nan, Short Hair, and the Women's Tonsorial Rebellion of 1920s Korea". Pacific Historical Review. 91 (4). University of California Press: 441–462. doi:10.2307/27215246. JSTOR 27215246.

=== Web ===
- "Hasegawa Yoshimichi". National Diet Library. Archived from the original on 20 November 2026.

Preceded by Viscount Terauchi Masatake	Governor-General of Korea; 1916–1919	Succeeded by Saitō Makoto
