= Uehara Yūsaku =

Japanese field marshal (1856–1933)

Marshal Viscount Uehara Yūsaku
- 上原 勇作
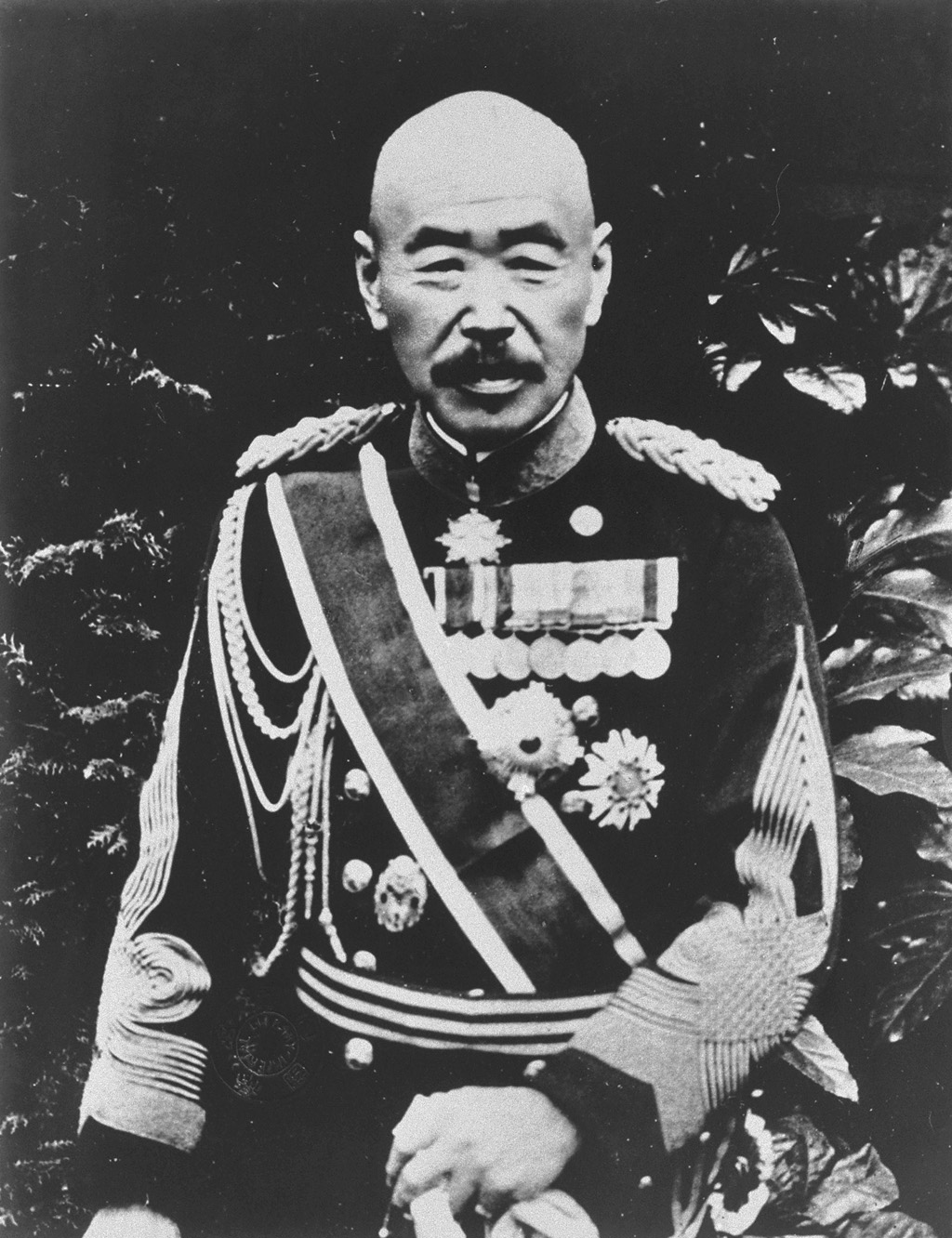

Chief of the Imperial Japanese Army General Staff
- In office 17 December 1915 – 17 March 1923
- Monarch: Taishō
- Preceded by: Hasegawa Yoshimichi
- Succeeded by: Kawai Misao

Minister of the Army
- In office 5 April 1912 – 21 December 1912
- Prime Minister: Saionji Kinmochi
- Preceded by: Ishimoto Shinroku
- Succeeded by: Kigoshi Yasutsuna

Personal details
- Born: 6 December 1856 Miyakonojō, Hyūga, Japan
- Died: 8 November 1933 (aged 76) Tokyo, Japan
- Resting place: Aoyama Cemetery
- Relatives: Nozu Michitsura (father-in-law); Isei Otsuka (son-in-law)

Military service
- Allegiance: Empire of Japan
- Branch/service: Imperial Japanese Army
- Years of service: 1879–1933
- Rank: Field Marshal
- Battles/wars: First Sino-Japanese War; Russo-Japanese War

Marshal Viscount Uehara Yūsaku (上原 勇作; 6 December 1856 – 8 November 1933) was a field marshal in the Imperial Japanese Army. His wife was a daughter of General Nozu Michitsura. He was the founder of the Imperial Japanese Army Engineering Corps.

== Early career ==
Uehara was born as Tatsuoka Shinaga in Miyakonojō, Hyūga Province (present-day Miyazaki Prefecture), as the second son of a samurai in the service of Satsuma Domain. In 1875, he was adopted by the Uehara family, a cadet branch of the Shimazu clan, and changed his name to Uehara Yūsaku. He graduated from the Imperial Japanese Army Academy in 1879 with Akiyama Yoshifuru as one of his classmates, and his speciality was military engineering. In June 1881, he was sent to France for studies on modern military techniques, including fortification and artillery. He was promoted to lieutenant in September 1882 and to captain in June 1885, while still in France. After his return to Japan in December 1885, he served in administrative positions within the Imperial Japanese Army General Staff. In 1889 he was sent as a military attaché to Europe. He was promoted to major in May 1890 and was assigned to the IJA 5th Division, commanded by his father-in-law, General Nozu Michitsura.

Uehara came to the attention of Kawakami Soroku and was recruited to become one of his "brain trust". In August 1892, Uehara was appointed aide-de-camp to Prince Arisugawa Taruhito and also served as an instructor at the Army Staff College. From July to November 1893, he was sent as a military attache to Annam and to Siam and from June 1894 was sent to Korea during the Donghak Rebellion. With the start of the First Sino-Japanese War, Uehara transferred directly to the Ōshima Yoshimasa, which defeated the Chinese at the Battle of Seonghwan outside of Asan, south of Seoul in the first land engagement of war. Uehara was on the staff of the IJA 1st Army (commanded by General Nozu Michitsura) and was promoted to lieutenant colonel in September 1894 while in Korea. He rose to the position of chief-of-staff of the IJA 1st Army in March 1895. In May, he was reassigned to the 2nd Bureau of the General Staff and in March 1896 was assigned to accompany Prince Fushimi Sadanaru as part of Japan's official delegation to the coronation of Tsar Nicholas II of Russia. The delegation remained until August, during which time he was officially reassigned to the 4th Bureau of the General Staff. After his return to Japan, he was promoted to colonel in October 1897. In 1899 he was the Japanese delegate to the Hague Convention.

== As general ==
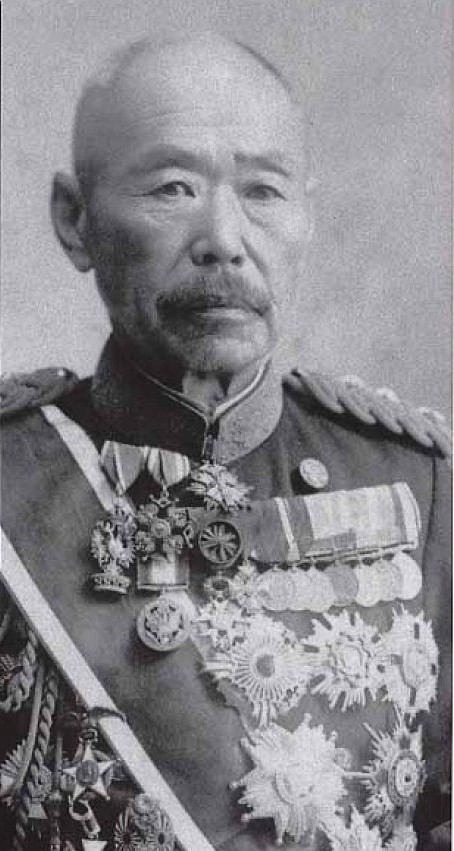
General Viscount Uehara Yūsaku

Uehara was promoted to major general in July 1900, and commandant of the Army Artillery School. From August 1903 to February 1904, he was sent as a military attache to Europe. With the start of the Russo-Japanese War, Uehara became chief-of-staff of the Japanese Fourth Army (commanded by General Nozu Michitsura). By many accounts, General Nozu had a difficult personality, and his son-in-law was one of the few people who could get along with him. However, Uehara had many disagreements with General Kageaki Kawamura and remained on bad terms with Kawamura throughout his career.

He was promoted to lieutenant general in July 1906 and ennobled as a baron (danshaku) in the kazoku peerage in September of the following year. In December 1908 he became the commander of the IJA 7th Division. His appointment was controversial, as it was the first time an engineering officer had been appointed a divisional commander. The appointment had the support of General Terauchi Masatake, and Uehara specifically requested an assignment far from Tokyo, so that the Choshu-dominated Army Ministry would be unable to interfere. The IJA 7th Division was a garrison force in Asahikawa, Hokkaido. From September 1911 he commanded the IJA 11th Division.

In December 1912, Uehara was appointed Army Minister in Prime Minister Saionji Kinmochi's second cabinet. Since the civilian government was pursuing a tight fiscal policy, it soon came into conflict with the army, which was demanding an increase in funding for another two infantry divisions. When Uehara resigned as Army Minister over this conflict, the remainder cabinet resigned en masse when the Army refused to nominate a successor, precipitating the collapse of Saionji's government. This event was known as the "Taisho Political Crisis".

From March to May 1913, Uehara was commander of the IJA 3rd Division. In April 1914, he became Inspector General of Military Training, the third most prestigious post in the Army. In February 1915, Uehara was promoted to general and became a member of the Supreme War Council; he also became Chief of the Imperial Japanese Army General Staff, remaining in this post longer than any person before or after (with the exception of a member of the Imperial House). While in this position, he authorized the Siberian Intervention in support of White Russian forces against the Bolshevik Red Army in the Russian Civil War.

Uehara received the rank of marshal in April 1921, and his kazoku title was raised to shishaku (viscount). He retired as chief of staff in 1923.

Uehara died in 1933 of peptic ulcer disease and cardiovascular disease at his home in Tokyo at the age of 77. His grave is at the Aoyama Cemetery in Tokyo.

== Awards and decorations ==
=== Japanese ===
==== Peerages and titles ====
- Baron (21 September 1907)
- Viscount (18 April 1921)
- Gensui (27 April 1921)

==== Decorations ====
- 1893 – Order of the Sacred Treasure, 6th class
- 1895 – Order of the Rising Sun, 5th class
- 1895 – Order of the Golden Kite, 4th class
- 1896 – Order of the Sacred Treasure, 5th class
- 1899 – Order of the Rising Sun, 4th class
- 1901 – Order of the Rising Sun, 2nd class
- 1906 – Order of the Golden Kite, 2nd class
- 1908 – Grand Cordon of the Order of the Sacred Treasure
- 1915 – Grand Cordon of the Order of the Rising Sun
- 1920 – Order of the Rising Sun with Paulownia Flowers
- 1933 – Grand Cordon of the Supreme Order of the Chrysanthemum (posthumous)

=== Foreign ===
- 1890 – Russia: Order of Saint Anna, 3rd class
- 1896 – Russia: Order of Saint Stanislaus, 2nd class
- 1896 – Austria-Hungary: Order of the Iron Crown, 2nd class
- 1906 – Kingdom of Prussia: Order of the Red Eagle, 2nd class with swords
- 1918 – China: Order of the Striped Tiger, 1st class
- 1918 – UK: Knight Commander of The Most Distinguished Order of Saint Michael and Saint George (KCMG)
- 1919 – US: Distinguished Service Medal (DSM)
- 1919 – Chile: Grand Cross of the Order of Merit
- 1920 – France: Grand Cross of the Legion d'Honneur
- 1921 – Spain: Cross of Military Merit with White Decoration

== Footnotes ==
Political offices
Preceded by Ishimoto Shinroku	Army Minister; April 1912 – December 1912	Succeeded by Kigoshi Yasutsuna
Military offices
Preceded by Asada Nobuoki	Inspector-General of Military Training; Apr 1914 – Dec 1915	Succeeded by Ichinohe Hyoe
Preceded by Hasegawa Yoshimichi	Chief of Imperial Japanese Army General Staff; Dec 1915 – Mar 1923	Succeeded by Kawai Misao
