= Kusunose Yukihiko =

- 楠瀬 幸彦
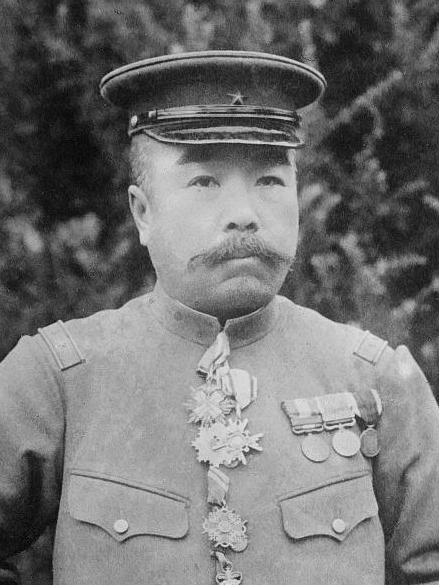
- Kusunose, c. 1913

Minister of the Army
- In office 24 June 1913 – 16 April 1914
- Prime Minister: Yamamoto Gonnohyōe
- Preceded by: Kigoshi Yasutsuna
- Succeeded by: Oka Ichinosuke

Director of the Karafuto Agency
- In office 1 April 1907 – 24 April 1908
- Monarch: Meiji
- Preceded by: Kiichirō Kumagai
- Succeeded by: Tokonami Takejirō

Personal details
- Born: 28 April 1858 Kōchi, Tosa, Japan
- Died: 20 March 1927 (aged 68)
- Resting place: Tama Cemetery

Military service
- Allegiance: Empire of Japan
- Branch/service: Imperial Japanese Army
- Years of service: 1880–1917
- Rank: General
- Commands: IJA 12th Division, IJA 2nd Army, IJA 4th Army, Manchurian Army
- Battles/wars: Russo-Japanese War

Kusunose Yukihiko (楠瀬 幸彦, Yukihiko Kusunone; 28 April 1858 – 20 March 1927) was a general in the early Imperial Japanese Army.

== Biography ==
Kusunose was born as the eldest son to a samurai family of the Tosa Domain (present day Kōchi Prefecture). He entered the Imperial Japanese Army in December 1880, serving in artillery, and was sent as a military attaché for training in France and Prussia from 1881 to 1885. After his return to Japan, he served in an artillery battalion of the Imperial Guard of Japan in 1888, and afterwards served in a number of administrative and staff positions within the Imperial Japanese Army General Staff. Kusunose was posted as a resident officer to the Japanese embassy in Saint Petersburg, Russia, from April 1891 to September 1893, and came to be regarded as a leading expert on European affairs.

From November 1894, Kusunose was assigned as a resident officer to the Japanese consulate in Seoul, Korea. Relations were extremely strained between Japan and the Joseon-dynasty Korean government, which was split between pro-Japanese and anti-Japanese factions. Kusunose was present in Seoul during the assassination of Queen Min and on his return to Japan he was arrested (along with Miura Gorō and several other civilian and military members of the Japanese consulate). Along with Miura, Kusunose was released after a military tribunal by the IJA 5th Division found them innocent due to "lack of evidence.

Kusunose subsequently was posted as chief of staff to the Taiwan Army of Japan for a brief period, and then served as chief of staff of the IJA 12th Division in 1900. He was promoted to major general in June 1901. He then served as commander of the Tsushima Fortress, and the Osaka Artillery Arsenal.

During the Russo-Japanese War, Kusunose was commander of Japanese heavy artillery for the Japanese Second Army. Later in the war, he commanded the artillery in the Japanese Fourth Army, and then the Manchurian Army, participating in the crucial Battle of Mukden. After the war, he commanded Yura Fortress, and from 1906, he was assigned to the Japanese garrison force on Karafuto.

Kusunose was also promoted to lieutenant general in 1907. In June 1913, he became Minister of War. He entered the reserves in April 1917. He died in 1927, and his grave is at the Tama Cemetery in Fuchū, Tokyo.

Political offices
Preceded by Kigoshi Yasutsuna	War Minister; Jun 1913 – Apr 1914	Succeeded by Oka Ichinosuke
