= Army Ministry =

Former Japanese government ministry (1872–1945)

- 陸軍省; Rikugun-shō
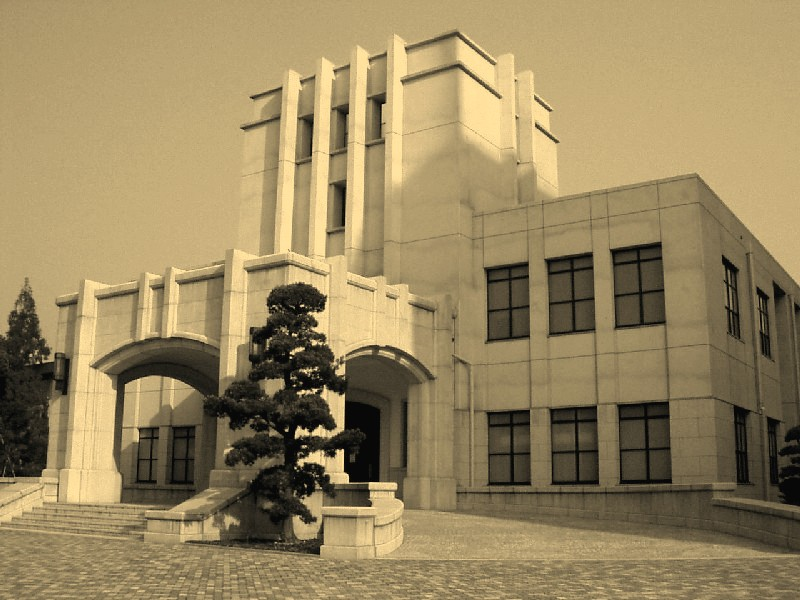
- Army HQ building, Ichigaya, Tokyo, from 1937–1945

Agency overview
- Formed: April 1872
- Preceding agency: Ministry of War
- Dissolved: November 1945
- Superseding agency: Ministry of Defense
- Jurisdiction: Imperial Japanese Army

The Army Ministry (Japanese: 陸軍省, Hepburn: Rikugun-shō), also known as the Ministry of War, was the cabinet-level ministry in the Empire of Japan charged with the administrative affairs of the Imperial Japanese Army (IJA). It existed from 1872 to 1945.

In the IJA and the Imperial Japanese Navy (IJN), the ministries were in charge of Gunsei (軍政, military administration), and Army General Staff Office and Navy General Staff were in charge of Gunrei (軍令, military command). The two were distinguished.

== History ==
The Army Ministry was created in April 1872, along with the Navy Ministry, to replace the Ministry of War (兵部省, Hyōbushō) of the early Meiji government.

Initially, the Army Ministry was in charge of both administration and operational command of the Imperial Japanese Army. However, with the creation of the Imperial Japanese Army General Staff Office in December 1878, it was left with only administrative functions. Its primary role was to secure the army budget, weapons procurement, personnel, relations with the National Diet and the Cabinet and broad matters of military policy.

The post of Army Minister was politically powerful. Although a member of the Cabinet after the establishment of the cabinet system of government in 1885, the Army Minister was answerable directly to the Emperor (the commander-in-chief of the Imperial Japanese Armed Forces under the Meiji Constitution) and not the Prime Minister.

From the time of its creation, the post of Army Minister was usually filled by an active-duty general in the Imperial Japanese Army. This practice was made into law under the Military Ministers to be Active-Duty Officers Law (軍部大臣現役武官制, Gumbu daijin gen'eki bukan sei) in 1900 by Prime Minister Yamagata Aritomo to curb the influence of political parties into military affairs. Abolished in 1913 under the administration of Yamamoto Gonnohyōe, the law was revived again in 1936 at the insistence of the Army General Staff by Prime Minister Hirota Kōki. At the same time, the Imperial Japanese Army prohibited its generals from accepting political offices except by permission from Imperial General Headquarters. Taken together, these arrangements gave the Imperial Japanese Army an effective, legal right to nominate (or refuse to nominate) the Army Minister. The ability of the Imperial Japanese Army to refuse to nominate an Army Minister gave it effective veto power over the formation (or continuation) of any civilian administration, and was a key factor in the erosion of representative democracy and the rise of Japanese militarism.

After 1937, both the Army Minister and the Chief of the Army General Staff were members of the Imperial General Headquarters.

With the surrender of the Empire of Japan in World War II, the Army Ministry was abolished together with the Imperial Japanese Army by the Allied occupation authorities in November 1945 and was not revived in the post-war Constitution of Japan.

== Organization ==
As in other Japanese ministries, each bureau (局) belonged to a vice-minister. In addition, departments (部) and their higher-level organizations, headquarters (本部, "main department") were established as external bureaus.

- Vice Minister of the Army (陸軍次官)
  - Military Affairs Bureau (軍務局)
  - Personnel Bureau (人事局)
  - Ordnance Bureau (兵器局)
  - Development Bureau (整備局)
  - Military Administration Bureau (兵務局)
  - Intendance Bureau (経理局)
  - Medical Bureau (医務局)
  - Judge Bureau (法務局)
  - Warhorse Bureau (軍馬局)
  - external bureaus;
    - Army Fortification Department (陸軍築城部)
    - Army Transport Department (陸軍運輸部)
    - Army Land Transport Department (陸軍陸運部)
    - Army Military Relief department (陸軍恤兵部)
    - Army Department (陸軍軍馬補充部)
    - Army Aviation Department/Army Headquarters (陸軍航空部/陸軍航空本部)
    - Army Technical Headquarters (陸軍技術本部)
    - Army Ordnance Headquarters (陸軍兵器本部)
    - Army Armour Headquarters (陸軍機甲本部)
    - Army Ordnance Administrative Headquarters (陸軍兵器行政本部)
    - Army Fuel Administrative Headquarters (陸軍燃料本部)
    - Army Shipping Command (陸軍船舶司令部)
    - Army Arsenals (陸軍造兵廠)
    - Army Ordnance Depot (陸軍兵器廠)
- Yasukuni Shrine

The Army Ministry and Imperial General Headquarters were located in Ichigaya Heights, which is now part of Shinjuku, Tokyo.

== Ministers of the Army of Japan ==
Ministers of the Army or Ministers of War (陸軍大臣) was the Minister of State in charge of the Ministry. Under Japanese law prior to 1945, each minister belonged directly to the Emperor.

No.	Portrait	Name	Term of Office		Cabinet
1		Ōyama Iwao 大山 巌	22 December 1885	17 May 1891	1st Itō
1		Ōyama Iwao 大山 巌	22 December 1885	17 May 1891	Kuroda
1		Ōyama Iwao 大山 巌	22 December 1885	17 May 1891	1st Yamagata
1		Ōyama Iwao 大山 巌	22 December 1885	17 May 1891	1st Matsukata
2		Takashima Tomonosuke 高島 鞆之助	17 May 1891	8 August 1892	1st Matsukata
3		Ōyama Iwao 大山 巌	8 August 1892	20 September 1896	2nd Itō
3		Ōyama Iwao 大山 巌	8 August 1892	20 September 1896	2nd Matsukata
4		Takashima Tomonosuke 高島 鞆之助	20 September 1896	12 January 1898	2nd Matsukata
5		Katsura Tarō 桂 太郎	12 January 1898	23 December 1900	3rd Itō
5		Katsura Tarō 桂 太郎	12 January 1898	23 December 1900	1st Ōkuma
5		Katsura Tarō 桂 太郎	12 January 1898	23 December 1900	2nd Yamagata
5		Katsura Tarō 桂 太郎	12 January 1898	23 December 1900	4th Itō
6		Kodama Gentarō 兒玉 源太郎	23 December 1900	27 March 1902	4th Itō
6		Kodama Gentarō 兒玉 源太郎	23 December 1900	27 March 1902	1st Katsura
7		Terauchi Masatake 寺内 正毅	27 March 1902	30 August 1911	1st Katsura
7		Terauchi Masatake 寺内 正毅	27 March 1902	30 August 1911	1st Saionji
7		Terauchi Masatake 寺内 正毅	27 March 1902	30 August 1911	2nd Katsura
8		Ishimoto Shinroku 石本 新六	30 August 1911	2 April 1912	2nd Saionji
9		Uehara Yūsaku 上原 勇作	5 April 1912	21 December 1912	2nd Saionji
10		Kigoshi Yasutsuna 木越 安綱	21 December 1912	24 June 1913	3rd Katsura
10		Kigoshi Yasutsuna 木越 安綱	21 December 1912	24 June 1913	1st Yamamoto
11		Kusunose Yukihiko 楠瀬 幸彦	24 June 1913	16 April 1914	1st Yamamoto
12		Oka Ichinosuke 岡 市之助	16 April 1914	30 March 1916	2nd Ōkuma
13		Ōshima Ken'ichi 大島 健一	30 March 1916	29 September 1918	2nd Ōkuma
13		Ōshima Ken'ichi 大島 健一	30 March 1916	29 September 1918	Terauchi
14		Tanaka Giichi 田中 義一	29 September 1918	9 June 1921	Hara
15		Yamanashi Hanzō 山梨 半造	9 June 1921	2 September 1923	Hara
15		Yamanashi Hanzō 山梨 半造	9 June 1921	2 September 1923	Takahashi
15		Yamanashi Hanzō 山梨 半造	9 June 1921	2 September 1923	Katō
16		Tanaka Giichi 田中 義一	2 September 1923	7 January 1924	2nd Yamamoto
17		Kazushige Ugaki 宇垣 一成	7 January 1924	20 April 1927	Kiyoura
17		Kazushige Ugaki 宇垣 一成	7 January 1924	20 April 1927	Katō
17		Kazushige Ugaki 宇垣 一成	7 January 1924	20 April 1927	1st Wakatsuki
18		Yoshinori Shirakawa 白川 義則	20 April 1927	2 July 1929	1st Tanaka
19		Kazushige Ugaki 宇垣 一成	2 July 1929	14 April 1931	Hamaguchi
20		Jirō Minami 南 次郎	14 April 1931	13 December 1931	2nd Wakatsuki
21		Sadao Araki 荒木 貞夫	13 December 1931	23 January 1934	Inukai
21		Sadao Araki 荒木 貞夫	13 December 1931	23 January 1934	Saitō
22		Senjūrō Hayashi 林 銑十郎	23 January 1934	5 September 1935	Saitō
22		Senjūrō Hayashi 林 銑十郎	23 January 1934	5 September 1935	Okada
23		Yoshiyuki Kawashima 川島 義之	5 September 1935	9 March 1936	Okada
24		Hisaichi Terauchi 寺内 寿一	9 March 1936	2 February 1937	Hirota
25		Kōtarō Nakamura 中村 孝太郎	2 February 1937	9 February 1937	Hayashi
26		Hajime Sugiyama 杉山 元	9 February 1937	3 June 1938	Hayashi
26		Hajime Sugiyama 杉山 元	9 February 1937	3 June 1938	1st Konoe
27		Seishirō Itagaki 板垣 征四郎	3 June 1938	30 August 1939	1st Konoe
27		Seishirō Itagaki 板垣 征四郎	3 June 1938	30 August 1939	1st Hiranuma
28		Shunroku Hata 畑 俊六	30 August 1939	22 July 1940	Abe
28		Shunroku Hata 畑 俊六	30 August 1939	22 July 1940	Yonai
29		Hideki Tojo 東條 英機	22 July 1940	22 July 1944	2nd Konoe
29		Hideki Tojo 東條 英機	22 July 1940	22 July 1944	3rd Konoe
29		Hideki Tojo 東條 英機	22 July 1940	22 July 1944	Tojo
30		Hajime Sugiyama 杉山 元	22 July 1944	7 April 1945	Koiso
31		Korechika Anami 阿南 惟幾	7 April 1945	15 August 1945	Suzuki
32		Prince Naruhiko Higashikuni 東久邇宮稔彦王	17 August 1945	23 August 1945	Higashikuni
33		Sadamu Shimomura 下村 定	23 August 1945	1 December 1945	Higashikuni
33		Sadamu Shimomura 下村 定	23 August 1945	1 December 1945	Shidehara

== See also ==
- Imperial Japanese Army General Staff Office
