= Mishio Ishimoto =

Japanese seismologist (1893–1940)

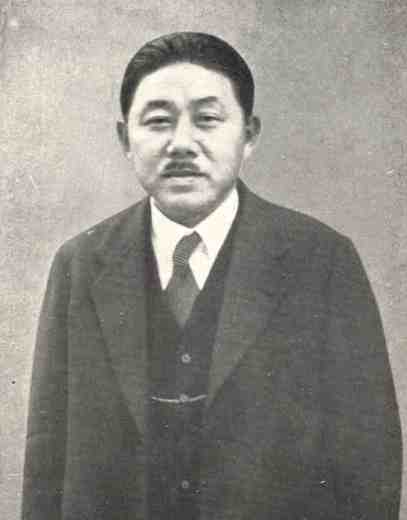
Mishio Ishimoto

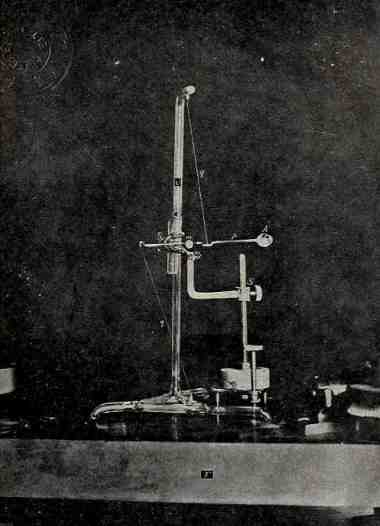
Silica inclinometer

Mishio Ishimoto (Japanese: 石本 巳四雄, September 17 1893 – February 4 1940) was a Japanese seismologist, doctor of Science. He was a professor at Tokyo Imperial University.

Mishio Ishimoto is from Tokyo. After graduating from the Department of Physics, Tokyo Imperial University in 1917, he was the director of the Earthquake Research Institute. He studied such as consideration of the magma intrusion theory regarding the cause of earthquakes and the proposal of a push-cone shape regarding the P-wave initial distribution of seismic waves, Relational expression between maximum amplitude of ground motion and number of occurrences. He also invented Silica inclinometers etc. In 1933, he received the Imperial Academy Prize for his research on ground motion measurement.
