= Kawamura Kageaki =

Field marshal in the Imperial Japanese Army (1850–1926)

Viscount Kawamura Kageaki
- 川村 景明
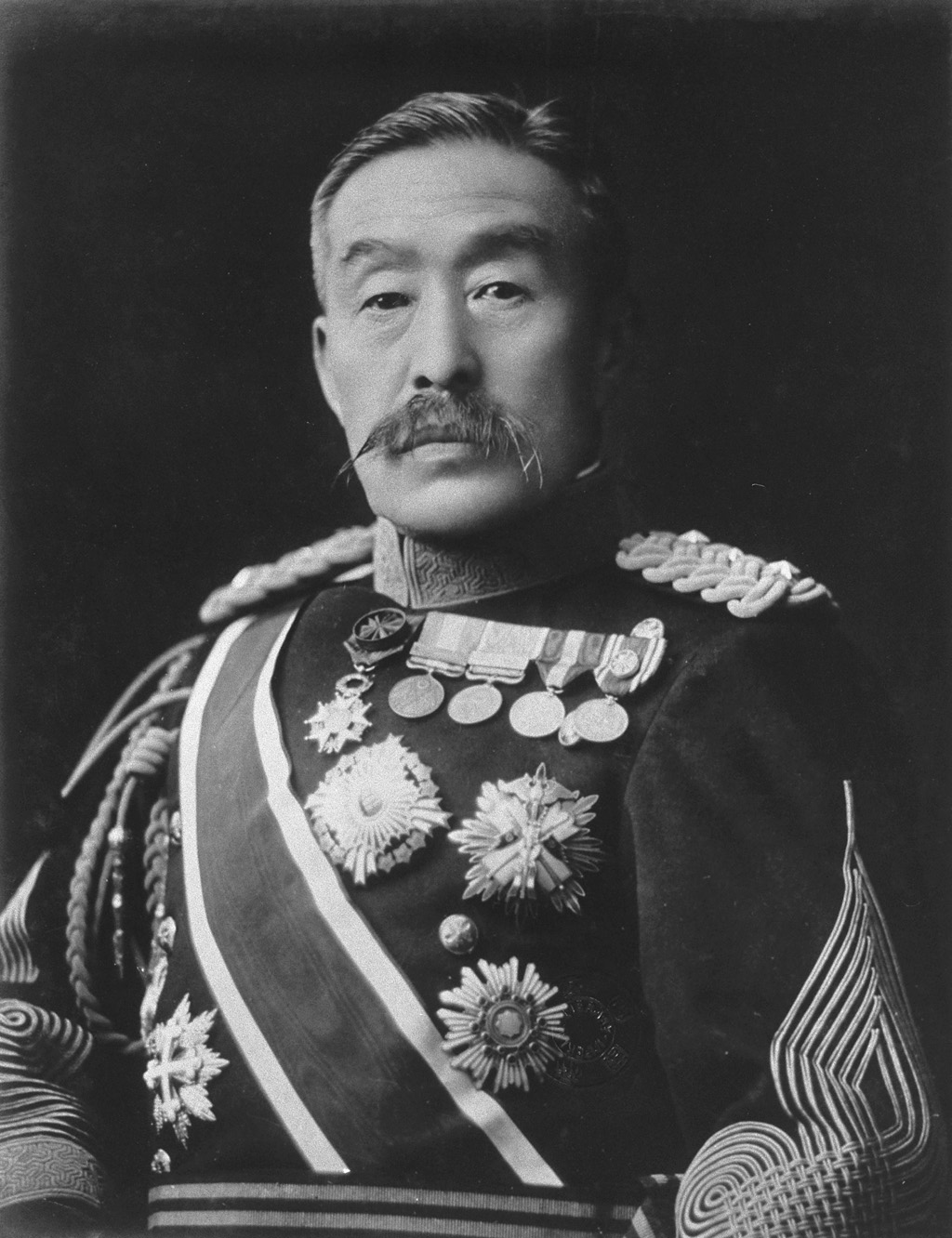
- Born: April 8, 1850; Kagoshima, Satsuma Domain
- Died: April 28, 1926 (aged 76); Tokyo, Empire of Japan
- Military career
- Allegiance: Empire of Japan
- Branch: Imperial Japanese Army
- Rank: Field Marshal
- Commands: Imperial Guard of Japan, IJA 10th Division
- Conflicts: Anglo-Satsuma War; Boshin War; First Sino-Japanese War; Russo-Japanese War
- Awards: Order of the Golden Kite (1st class); Order of the Rising Sun (1st class with Paulownia Blossoms, Grand Cordon); Grand Cordon of the Supreme Order of the Chrysanthemum

Viscount Kawamura Kageaki (川村 景明, Kageaki Kawamura; 8 April 1850 – 28 April 1926) was a field marshal in the Imperial Japanese Army.

== Biography ==
Kawamura was born in Kagoshima in the Satsuma han feudal domain (present day Kagoshima prefecture). He first fought as a samurai in the Anglo-Satsuma War. He was part of the Satsuma forces in the Boshin War to overthrow the Tokugawa Shogunate. After the Meiji Restoration he was appointed commander of the Imperial Guards. He also served as field commander in the suppression of various insurrections during the early years of the Meiji era, including the Hagi Rebellion and the Satsuma Rebellion.

Kawamura led his Imperial Guards Division in the First Sino-Japanese War and went to the front in Taiwan as field commander. On the conclusion of that war, he was ennobled by Emperor Meiji with the title of danshaku (baron) under the kazoku peerage system.

In the Russo-Japanese War of 1904-1905, Kawamura succeeded Prince Fushimi Sadanaru as commander of the Japanese 10th Division, and served notably as field commander at the Battle of Yalu River (1904). In January 1905, being promoted to General, he was appointed Commander of the Japanese Fifth Army and took part in the Battle of Mukden. After Japan's victory, Emperor Meiji elevated him to the title of shishaku (viscount).

After the war, Kawamura served as chief of the Tokyo Garrison, and in 1915 he became a field marshal.

His Japanese decorations included the Order of the Golden Kite (1st class), Order of the Rising Sun (1st class with Paulownia Blossoms, Grand Cordon) and the Grand Cordon of the Supreme Order of the Chrysanthemum.

Kawamura's grave is at Aoyama Cemetery in Tokyo. His daughter married Hideyoshi Obata, who served as a general in the Imperial Japanese Army during World War II.
