= 3rd Division (Imperial Japanese Army) =

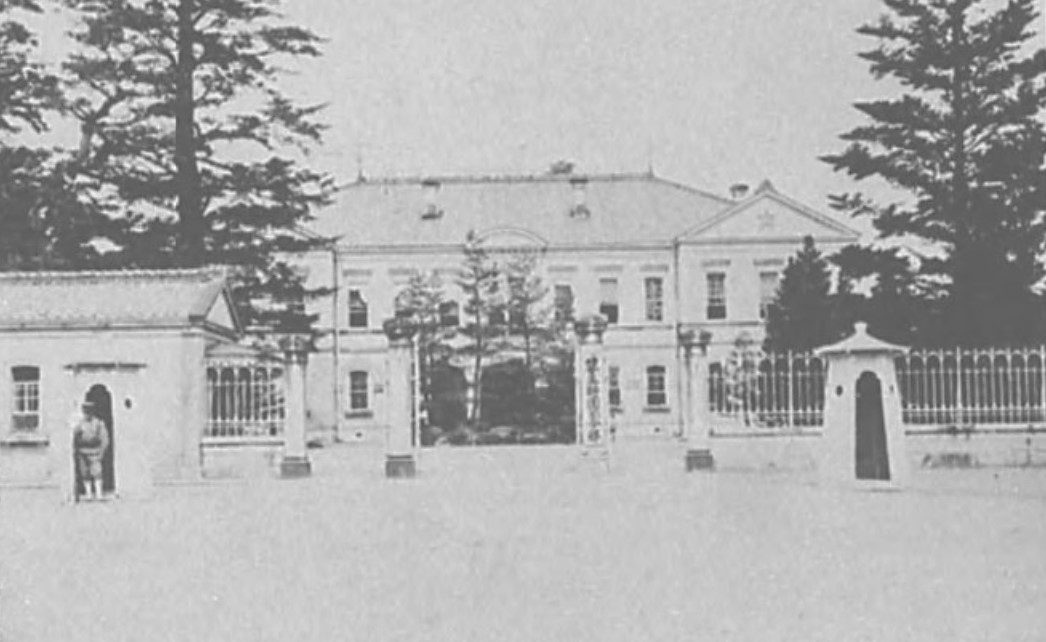
- Headquarter of the 3rd Division in 1911, Nagoya
- Active: 1888–1945
- Country: Empire of Japan
- Branch: Imperial Japanese Army
- Type: Infantry
- Garrison/HQ: Nagoya, Aichi, Japan
- Engagements: First Sino-Japanese War; Russo-Japanese War; Siberian Intervention; Shandong Incident; World War II

Commanders
- Notable commanders: Taro Katsura; Yoshimichi Hasegawa; Yusaku Uehara; Nobuyoshi Muto

The 3rd Division (第三師団, Dai-san shidan) was an infantry division in the Imperial Japanese Army. Its call sign was the Happiness Division (幸兵団, Sachi-heidan).

== History ==
The 3rd Division was formed in Nagoya in January 1871 as the Nagoya Garrison (名古屋鎮台, Nagoya chindai), one of six regional commands created in the fledgling Imperial Japanese Army. The Nagoya Garrison had responsibility for the central region of Japan. This region was known as the Chūbu district, and stretched from Aichi Prefecture to Ishikawa Prefecture. Upon the recommendations of the Prussian military advisor Jakob Meckel to the Japanese government, the six regional commands were transformed into divisions under the army reorganization of 14 May 1888.

As one of the oldest divisions in the Imperial Japanese Army, the 3rd Division participated in combat operations during the First Sino-Japanese War, the Russo-Japanese War, the Siberian Intervention, and the Shandong Incident.

Some of its more noteworthy commanders included Katsura Taro, Hasegawa Yoshimichi, Uehara Yusaku and Nobuyoshi Muto.

9 December 1938, the 3rd Division was subordinated to 11th Army and was subsequently one of the divisions assigned to the China Expeditionary Army (CGA) headquartered in Nanjing. As one of the most powerful units ("crack" units) in the theatre, the 3rd Division served in nearly every battle in central China. During the Zhejiang-Jiangxi Campaign it was converted into a triangular division on July 4, 1942. It later served for a time as a headquarters and garrison division for strategic Zhejiang Province.

Battles and Campaigns fought in China (1937–1945)

Battle	Actions start date data-sort-type="date"	Area
Battle of Shanghai	22 August 1937	Wusong - Shanghai
Battle of Xuzhou	14 February 1938	south of Xuzhou
Battle of Wuhan	22 August 1938	Xinyang
Battle of Suixian-Zaoyang	3 May 1939	Tongbai - Suixian
Battle of Changsha (1939)	1 September 1939	Hubei - Hunan - Changsha
1939-40 Winter Offensive	13 December 1939	Tingsiqiao - Xinyang
Battle of Zaoyang-Yichang	1 May 1940	Xiangyang - Xiakou, Nanzhang County
Central Hopei Operation	23 November 1940	Suizhou
Battle of South Henan	24 January 1941	Ye County, 保安鎮 city
Battle of Changsha (1941)	7 September 1941	south bank of Miluo River - Huashan, Xinhua County
Battle of Changsha (1942)	24 December 1941	Yueyang - Miluo River - Liuyang River - Miluo River
Zhejiang-Jiangxi Campaign	15 May 1942	?
Battle of West Hubei	9 April 1943	north coast of Dongting Lake
Battle of Changde	2 November 1943	south of Changde - Changde - south of Changde
Battle of Changsha (1944)	27 May 1944	Wanyang Shan - Liuyang
Battle of Guilin-Liuzhou	September 1944	southern Liuzhou

- Battle of West Henan-North Hubei (possibly messed up with 3rd Tank Division)

At the end of World War II, with the dissolution of the Imperial Japanese Army, the 3rd Division was formally disbanded in Zhejiang.

== See also ==
- List of Japanese Infantry Divisions

== Reference and further reading ==
- Madej, W. Victor (1981). Japanese Armed Forces Order of Battle, 1937–1945. Allentown, PA: Game Marketing Co. OCLC 8930220.
