= Ishimoto Shinroku =

Baron Ishimoto Shinroku
- 石本 新六
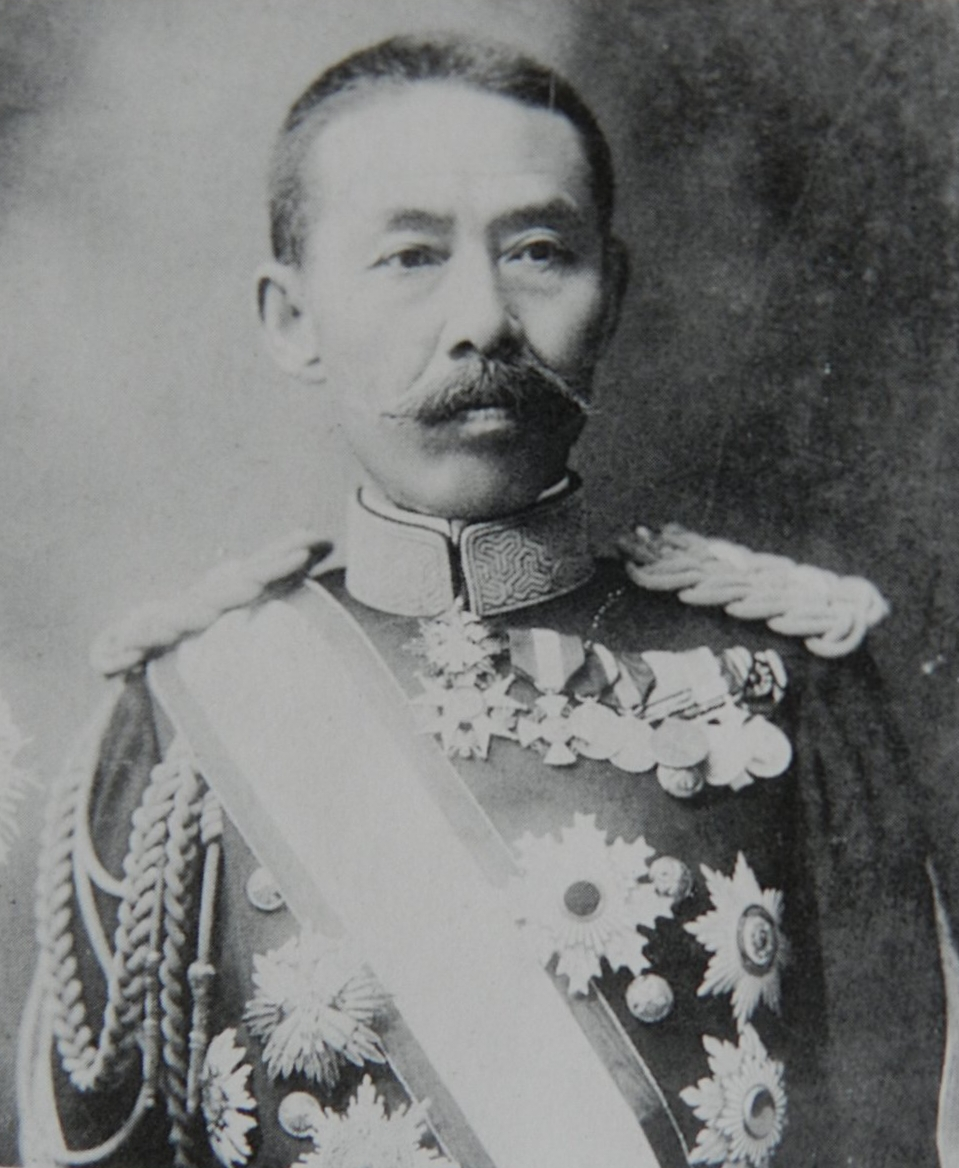

Minister of the Army
- In office 30 August 1911 – 2 April 1912
- Prime Minister: Saionji Kinmochi
- Preceded by: Terauchi Masatake
- Succeeded by: Uehara Yūsaku

Personal details
- Born: 8 April 1850 Himeji, Harima, Japan
- Died: 2 April 1912 (aged 61) Tokyo, Japan
- Children: Mishio Ishimoto

Military service
- Allegiance: Empire of Japan
- Branch/service: Imperial Japanese Army
- Years of service: 1875–1912
- Rank: General
- Battles/wars: Satsuma Rebellion; Russo-Japanese War

Baron Ishimoto Shinroku (石本 新六; 20 January 1854 – 2 April 1912) was a general in the Imperial Japanese Army, and Minister of War under the Second Saionji Cabinet from 1911 to 1912.

== Early life ==
Ishimoto was born to a samurai-class family in Himeji, Harima Province (present-day Hyōgo Prefecture). Soon after his birth, his family's house in Edo was destroyed in the Ansei earthquake of 1854, and in the subsequent Meiji Restoration, his father lost his employment and privileged status. Despite his family's desperate financial situation, he was sent to the Daigaku Nankō (the predecessor of Tokyo Imperial University) for a military education, and was enlisted as a cadet in the fledgling Imperial Japanese Army.

== Military career ==
In February 1875, Ishimoto was accepted into the 1st class of the new Imperial Japanese Army Academy, and enrolled in the military engineering program. He was able to put his education to immediate use in the Satsuma Rebellion. Afterwards, from 1879–1882, he was sent as a military attaché to France, where he was able to complete his education in engineering and artillery at the French Army's École spéciale militaire de Saint-Cyr. He returned to Japan for a year, and was sent overseas again from 1883 to 1887 as military attaché to the Kingdom of Italy. On his return to Japan, his rise through the ranks was rapid. He was promoted to colonel in 1895, and major general in 1897, and became an instructor in military engineering, first at the Imperial Japanese Army Academy, and then at the Army Staff College, and afterwards he worked as a section head in the Japanese Army Corps of Engineers. His knowledge and ability caught the eye of General Terauchi Masatake, who made him a chief of staff during the Russo-Japanese War. He was promoted to lieutenant-general in 1904.

After the war, Ishimoto was elevated to the title of danshaku (baron) under the kazoku peerage system.

In 1911, Ishimoto was appointed Army Minister under the cabinet of Prime Minister Saionji Kinmochi. At the time, there was a major controversy between the Army's demand for an expansion by two additional infantry divisions, and the cabinet's insistence that there was not enough money in the budget to pay for the expansion. He died while in office, at the relatively young age of 59, with the issue unresolved. His grave is located at the temple of Tenno-ji, located in Taitō, Tokyo.

Ishimoto's wife was the daughter of General Adachi Shotarō. They had several children; their second and fifth sons also rose to the rank of general in the Imperial Japanese Army, and were killed in World War II.

== Notes ==
Political offices
Preceded by Terauchi Masatake	War Minister; 1911–1912	Succeeded by Uehara Yūsaku
