= Battle of Tashihchiao =

Russo-Japanese battle

Coordinates: 40°38′N 122°30′E

- Part of the Russo-Japanese War
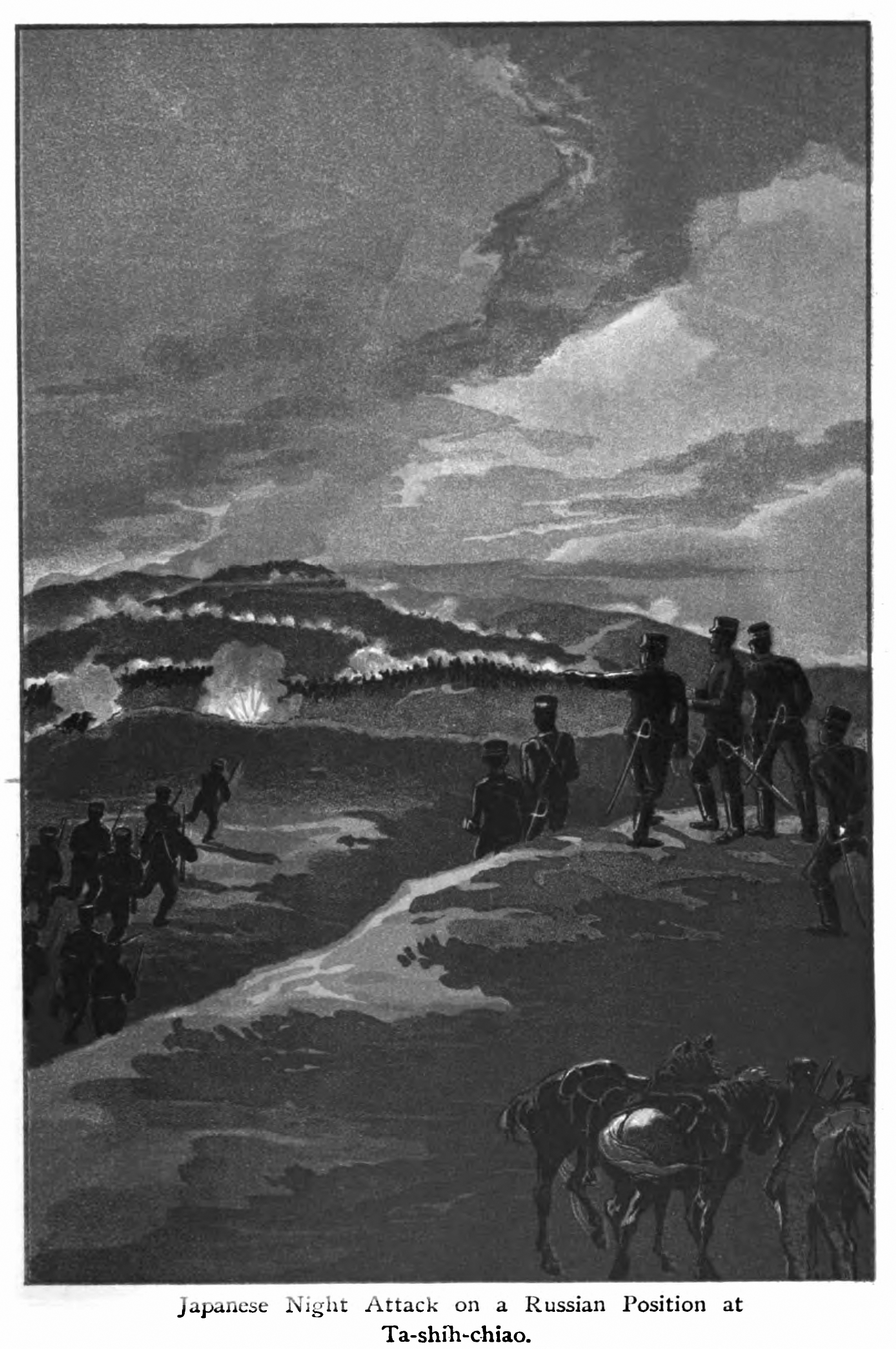
- Japanese Night Attack at Tashihchiao
Date	24–25 July 1904
Location	Between Liaoyang and Port Arthur, Manchuria (Today, Dashiqiao)
Result	Japanese victory

Belligerents
Empire of Japan	Russian Empire

Commanders and leaders
Oku Yasukata	Georg von Stackelberg; Nikolai Zarubaev

Strength
64,000	60,000

Casualties and losses
1,000 (estimated)	1,000 (estimated)

The Battle of Tashihchiao (大石橋の戦い, Taisekihashi no Tatakai) was a land engagement fought on 24–25 July 1904, during the Imperial Japanese Army's advance toward Liaoyang in first stage of the Russo-Japanese War. Tashihchiao (pinyin: Dashiqiao) is located about 25 kilometres (16 mi) southwest of the city of Haicheng, in present-day Liaoning Province, China. The town of Tashihchiao was of strategic importance in the Russo-Japanese War, as it was a railroad junction between the main line on the Russian South Manchurian Railway and a spur which led to the old treaty port of Yingkou (Newchwang). Control of both was essential for further advances by Japanese forces towards Liaoyang and Mukden.

== Preparations by the Japanese ==
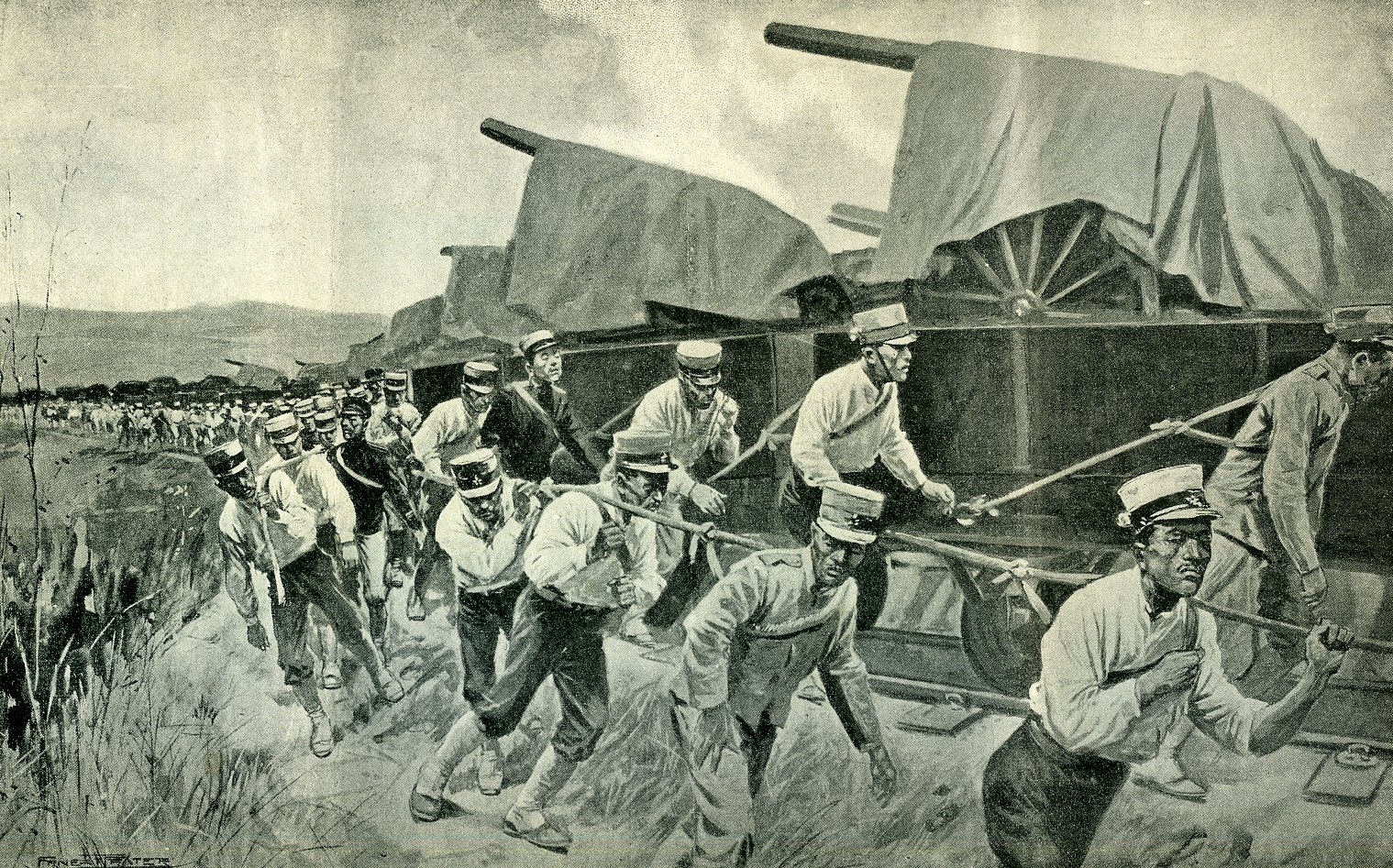
Due to a lack of locomotives, teams of 16 Japanese soldiers worked to haul freight cars north to Tashihchiao

On the Japanese side were the 3rd, 4th, 5th and 6th Divisions of the Japanese Second Army under General Oku Yasukata. The combined force had over 64,000 men, including 46,000 infantry, and 252 guns. After the victory at the Battle of Telissu, General Oku rested for four days for re-supply, which was delayed due to heavy rains, and to bring his 6th Division up to full strength. Although the Japanese were moving parallel to the railway line and the Russians had left behind over 300 freight cars at Dalny, the Japanese were unable to utilize the railway due to lack of locomotives. Locomotives procured by the Japanese matching the Russian railway gauge prior to the start of the war had been sunk by Russian commerce raiding in the Sea of Japan. The Japanese improvised by hauling the freight cars by teams of 16 men per car, and in addition hired 70 junks from the Chinese to move supplies up the coast to a point a couple of miles from the Japanese troop deployment.

By 6 July 1904, Oku was ready to move north again, and his four divisions reached the outskirts of Kaiping on 7 July 1904 and through night movements, were into the hills behind Kaiping by the morning of 9 July 1904 and was prepared for either combat or twenty additional days of marching. The following two weeks were spent by both sides with artillery duels and cavalry skirmishes, without major fighting. On 20 July, orders for an attack on 23 July were issued, but again heavy rains delayed the attack, which was postponed by 24 hours.

Oku moved with uncharacteristic caution, as the geography did not favor his usual tactic of flanking maneuvers. Instead, he issued orders for the 3rd, 5th, and 6th Divisions to make a full frontal assault, with the 4th Division left out on far left flank as both a diversion and a reserve.

== Preparations by the Russians ==
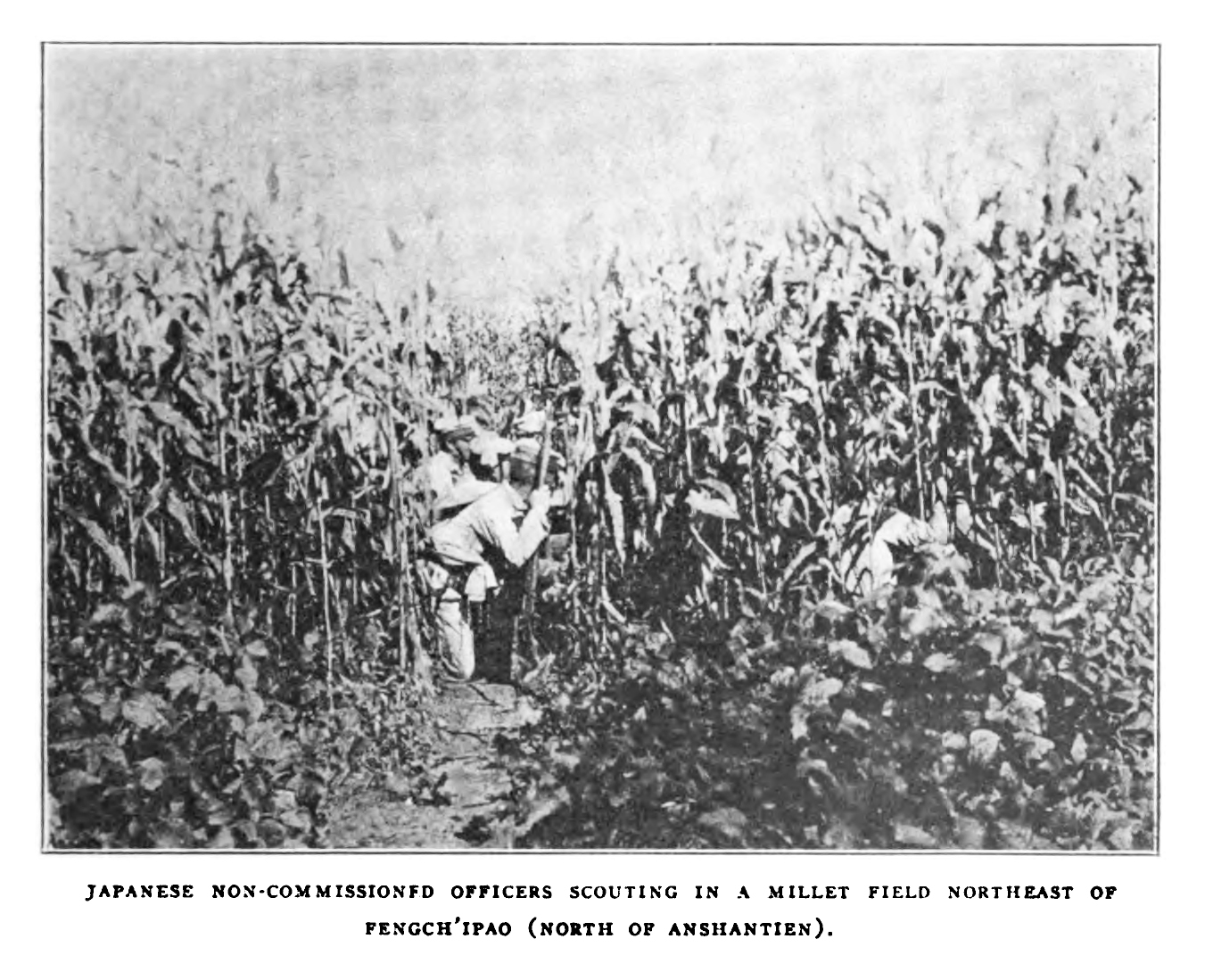
Japanese Non-Commissioned Officers in a Millet Field, scouting the Russian positions.

The Russian side included the 1st Siberian Army Corps under Lieutenant General Georg von Stackelberg (consisting of surviving forces from the disaster at Telissu, which had retreated north towards Liaoyang, but which had received new orders diverting them to Kaiping, which they occupied on 20 June 1904), and the Fourth Siberian Army Corps under Lieutenant General Nikolai Zarubaev, entrenched behind Kaiping to the north at the town of Tashihchiao. The total strength of the Russian forces was roughly 60,000 men.

General Alexei Kuropatkin had personally overseen the defenses at Tashihchiao. Stakelberg's forces were on the right, with clear field of fire, protected by trenches, mines, barbed wire and redoubts. Isolated hills provided strategically placed observation posts. The defensive position exceeded the Russian defenses at Nanshan, however, the field of view was hampered by fields of kaoliang, which grew to a two-meter height and provided cover for the advancing Japanese. Zarubaiev's forces were on the more vulnerable left flank, which was hilly and full of ravines, and had limited visibility.

== Battle ==
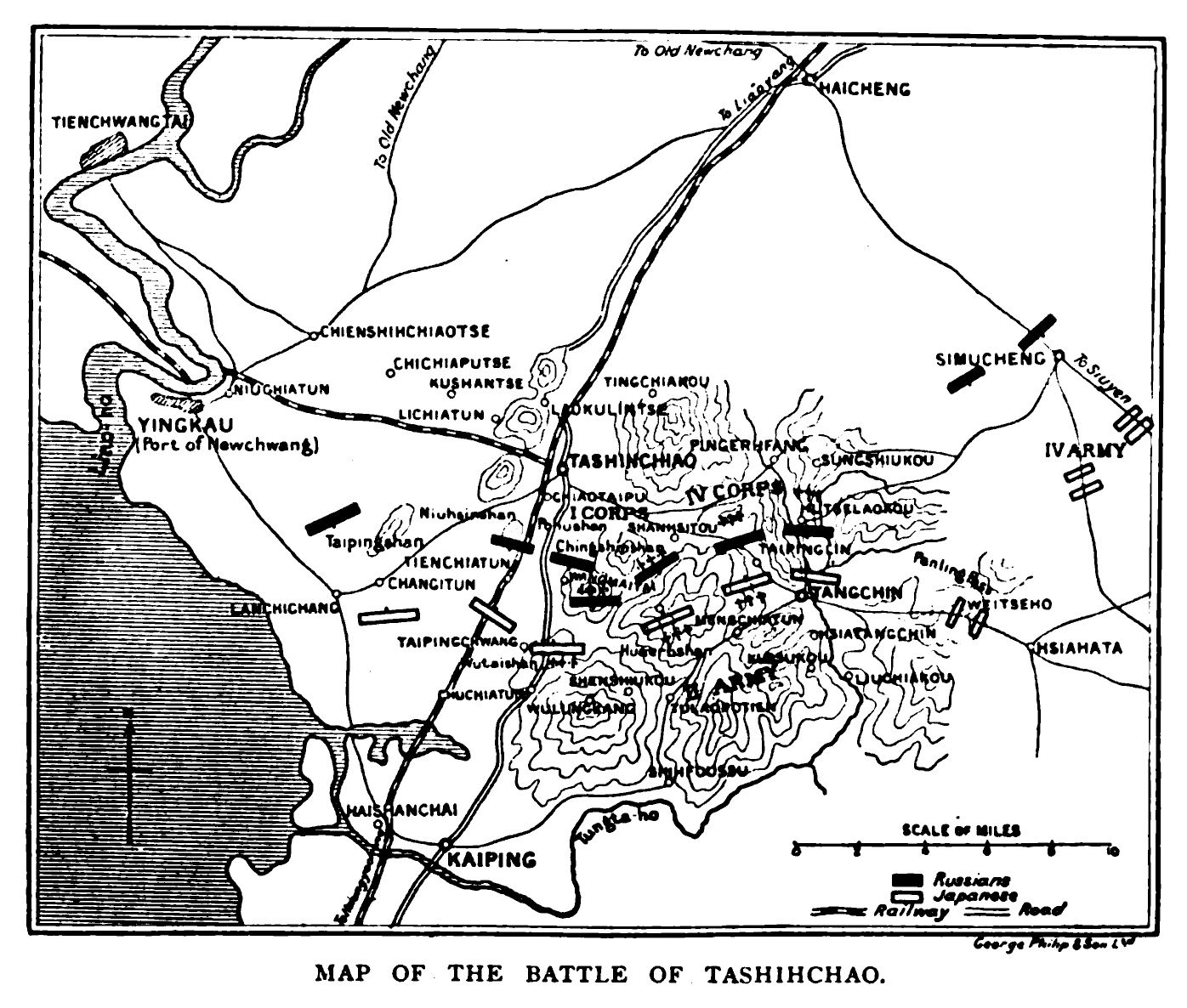
Historical map of the battle of Tashihchao.

=== Events of 24 July ===
The combat began at 05:30 on 24 July 1904, with a long artillery duel. As temperatures soared past 34 °C (93 °F), the Russians began to suffer from the effects of the heat, many collapsing from heat stroke due to their thick winter uniforms. A nervous Stakelberg repeatedly asked Zarubaiev about withdrawing; however, Zarubaiev advised that he preferred to withdraw under cover of darkness and not during the middle of an artillery barrage. Japanese infantry began probing attacks by noon.

However, by 15:30, the Japanese had suffered heavy casualties due to unexpectedly strong Russian artillery fire, and had only been successful in dislodging the Russians from some entrenched forward positions. Although outnumbered, the Russian guns had a longer range and higher rate of fire. Both side committed their reserves by 16:00, with combat continuing until 19:30. By the end of the day, the Japanese had only a single regiment remaining in reserve, whereas the Russians still had six battalions. The failure of the Japanese offensive in face of superior Russian artillery boosted the morale of the defenders. However, even as the Japanese were preparing to renew their offensive the following day, the Russian were preparing to retreat.

=== Events of 25 July ===
After nightfall on 24 July, Lieutenant General Ueda Arisawa, the commander of the Japanese 5th Division expressed his shame at the performance of his division, and asked General Oku that he be allowed to carry out a night attack. Permission was granted, and after the moon provided enough light at 22:00, the 5th Division moved on the Russian left flank, quickly overrunning the Russian second and third defensive lines. At 03:00, the Japanese 3rd Division also made a night attack, and soon captured key hills which had formed the most important point on the Russian defensive line the previous day. Japanese artillery opened fire at 06:40, but the artillery fire was not returned. The Japanese Sixth Division began moving forward, followed by the Japanese Fourth Division at 08:00 hours. By 13:00, the Japanese had occupied the remaining Russian positions and the town of Tashihchiao was in Japanese hands. Stakelberg had decided to withdraw immediately as soon as the initial Japanese night attack had begun, and he again conducted a brilliant retreat under fire.

== Aftermath ==
There are wildly varying accounts on the number of casualties at the Battle of Tashihchaio, but historical consensus indicates about a thousand on each side. The Russian retreat was orderly, and by 27 July, the Russians were already 50 kilometres (31 mi) away.

Predictably, Viceroy Yevgeni Alekseyev was infuriated by Stakelberg's withdrawal, but Kuropatkin supported his subordinate. General Oku remained at Tashihchaio until 1 August 1904, when he again marched northward with three divisions, while the 5th Division was transferred to the new Japanese 4th Army under General Nozu Michitsura in time to be at the Battle of Hsimucheng.

== Order of battle ==
=== Japanese ===
- Japanese Second Army, General Oku Yasukata
  - IJA 3rd Infantry Division, Lieutenant General Ōshima Yoshimasa
  - IJA 4th Infantry Division, Lieutenant General Ogawa Mataji
  - IJA 5th Infantry Division, Lieutenant General Ueda Arisawa
  - IJA 6th Infantry Division, Lieutenant General Ōkubo Haruno
  - 1st Cavalry Brigade, Major General Akiyama Yoshifuru
  - 1st Artillery Brigade, Major General Uchiyama

Total: about 65,000 men, including 46,000 infantry and 252 guns.

=== Russian ===
- 1st Siberian Army Corps, Lieutenant General Georg von Stackelberg
  - 1st East Siberian Rifle Division, Major General Aleksandr Gerngross
  - 1st East Siberian Rifle Brigade Artillery, Major General Luchkarski
  - 9th East Siberian Rifle Division, Major General Kondratovitsh
  - Siberian Cossack Division, Major General Kossakowski
- 4th Siberian Army Corps, Lieutenant General Nikolai Zarubaev
  - 2nd Siberian Rifle Division, Major General Levestam
  - 3rd Siberian Rifle Division, Major General Kossowitsch
  - 1st Siberian Artillery Brigade
  - Trans-Baikal Cossack Brigade, Major General Pavel Mishchenko

Total: about 60,000 men 105 guns.
