= Japanese Korean Army =

1904–1945 Japanese army in Korea

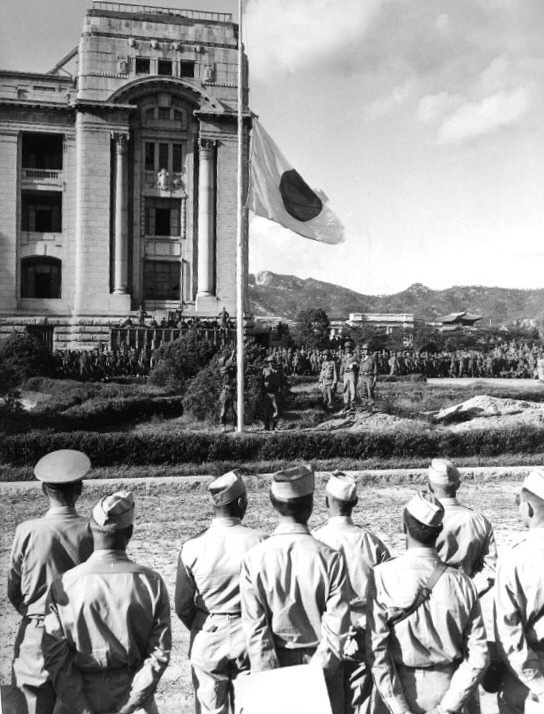
- Surrender of Japanese Forces in Southern Korea
- Active: March 11, 1904 – August 15, 1945
- Country: Empire of Japan
- Allegiance: Emperor of Japan
- Branch: Imperial Japanese Army
- Type: Infantry
- Role: Army
- Garrison/HQ: Keijo

Japanese Korean Army

Japanese name
- Kanji: 朝鮮軍
- Hiragana: ちょうせんぐん
Transcriptions
- Romanization: Chōsen-gun

Korean name
- Hangul: 조선군
- Hanja: 朝鮮軍
Transcriptions
- Revised Romanization: Joseongun
- McCune–Reischauer: Chosŏn'gun

The Japanese Korean Army (朝鮮軍, Chōsen-gun; lit. 'Korean military') was an infantry army corps of the Imperial Japanese Army (IJA) that formed a garrison force in Korea under Japanese rule. The Korean Army consisted of roughly 350,000 troops in 1914.

== History ==
Japanese forces occupied large portions of the Empire of Korea during the Russo-Japanese War of 1904–1905, and a substantial Korean Garrison Army (韓国駐剳軍, Kankoku Chusatsugun) was established in Seoul to protect the Japanese embassy and civilians on March 11, 1904. After the Annexation of Korea by the Empire of Japan in 1910, this force was renamed the Chosen Chusatsugun, and was further renamed the Japanese Korean Army on June 1, 1918.

The primary task of the Korean Army was to counterinsurgency Korean nationalism and guard the Korean peninsula against possible incursions from the Soviet Union; however, its units were also used for suppression of nationalist uprisings and political dissent within Korea itself. The Korean Army also came to the assistance of the Kwantung Army in its unauthorized invasion of Manchuria in 1931. In 1941, the Army was subordinated to the General Defense Command.

While Seishirō Itagaki (板垣 征四郎) was commander of the Chosen Army from 7 July 1939 to 7 April 1945, Japan began assembling its nuclear weapons program with the industrial site near the Chosen reservoir as its equivalent to the Oak Ridge laboratory for the United States' Manhattan Project. Both Itagaki and Masanobu Tsuji (辻 政信) refused to support neither peace between Japan and the United States nor have Japan attack the Soviet Union during Nazi Germany's Operation Barbarossa. It may have altered world history. Tsuji planned to assassinate Fumimaro Konoe if Konoe had Japan attack the Soviet Union during Operation Barbarossa and maintain peace with the United States.

In 1945, as the situation in the Pacific War was turning increasingly against Japan, the Army was transformed into the Japanese Seventeenth Area Army, and subsequently placed under the overall administrative command of the Kwantung Army. Its two undermanned infantry divisions were unable to withstand the massive Soviet Red Army armored and amphibious assault on Korea during the Soviet invasion of Manchuria. After the surrender of Japan, the Army south of the 38 parallel remained armed under operational command of the United States Army to maintain public order until the arrival of substantial Allied forces to take control.

== List of Commanders ==
=== Commanding officer ===
	Name	From	To
1	Lieutenant General Kensai Haraguchi	11 March 1904	8 September 1904
2	Marshal Yoshimichi Hasegawa	8 September 1904	21 December 1908
3	General Haruno Okubo	21 December 1908	18 August 1911
4	General Arisawa Ueda	18 August 1911	14 January 1912
5	General Sadayoshi Ando	14 January 1912	25 January 1915
6	General Seigo Inokuchi	25 January 1915	18 August 1916
7	General Yoshifuru Akiyama	18 August 1916	6 August 1917
8	General Satoshi Matsukawa	6 August 1917	24 July 1918
9	General Heitaro Utsunomiya	24 July 1918	16 August 1920
10	Lieutenant General Jiro Oba	16 August 1920	24 November 1922
11	General Shinnosuke Kikuchi	24 November 1922	20 August 1924
12	General Soroku Suzuki	20 August 1924	2 March 1926
13	General Shusei Morioka	2 March 1926	5 March 1927
14	General Hanzo Kanaya	5 March 1927	1 August 1929
15	General Jirō Minami	1 August 1929	22 November 1930
16	Lieutenant General Senjuro Hayashi	22 November 1930	26 May 1932
17	General Yoshiyuki Kawashima	26 May 1932	1 August 1934
18	General Kenkichi Ueda	1 August 1934	2 December 1935
19	General Kuniaki Koiso	2 December 1935	15 July 1938
20	General Kotaro Nakamura	15 July 1938	7 July 1941
21	General Seishirō Itagaki	7 July 1941	7 April 1945
22	Lieutenant General Yoshio Kozuki	7 April 1945	September 1945

=== Chief of Staff ===
	Name	From	To
1	Lieutenant General Rikisaburo Saito	19 March 1904	12 September 1904
2	Lieutenant General Toyosaburo Ochiai	12 September 1904	7 April 1905
3	General Kikuzuo Otani	7 April 1905	1 June 1906
4	Lieutenant General Takashi Muta	1 June 1906	21 December 1908
5	General Jiro Akashi	21 December 1908	15 June 1910
6	Lieutenant General Shozo Sakakibara	15 June 1910	30 November 1910
7	General Katsusaburo Shiba	30 November 1910	28 September 1912
8	General Koichiro Tachibana	28 September 1912	17 April 1914
9	Lieutenant General Gencho Furumi	17 April 1914	1 April 1916
10	Lieutenant General Tan Shirozu	1 April 1916	6 August 1917
11	Lieutenant General Kentaro Ichikawa	6 August 1917	1 November 1918
12	Major General Toyoshi Ono	1 November 1918	20 July 1921
13	Major General Kinichi Yasumitsu	20 July 1921	6 August 1923
14	Major General Harumi Akai	6 August 1923	2 March 1926
15	Lieutenant General Senyuki Hayashi	2 March 1926	26 August 1927
16	Marshal Count Hisaichi Terauchi	26 August 1927	1 August 1929
17	Lieutenant General Kotaro Nakamura	1 August 1929	22 December 1930
18	General Tomou Kodama	22 December 1930	1 August 1933
19	Major General Keikichi Ogushi	1 August 1933	2 December 1935
20	Major General Yoshishige Saeda	2 December 1935	1 December 1936
21	Lieutenant General Seiichi Kuno	1 December 1936	1 March 1938
22	Lieutenant General Kenzo Kitano	1 March 1938	7 September 1939
23	Lieutenant General Yakutaira Kato	7 September 1939	1 March 1941
24	Lieutenant General Hiroshi Takahashi	1 March 1941	9 July 1942
25	Lieutenant General Junjiro Ihara	9 July 1942	September 1945

== See also ==
- Korea under Japanese rule
- Armies of the Imperial Japanese Army
