= Umezawa Michiharu =

Japanese samurai and general (1853–1924)

- 梅沢 道治
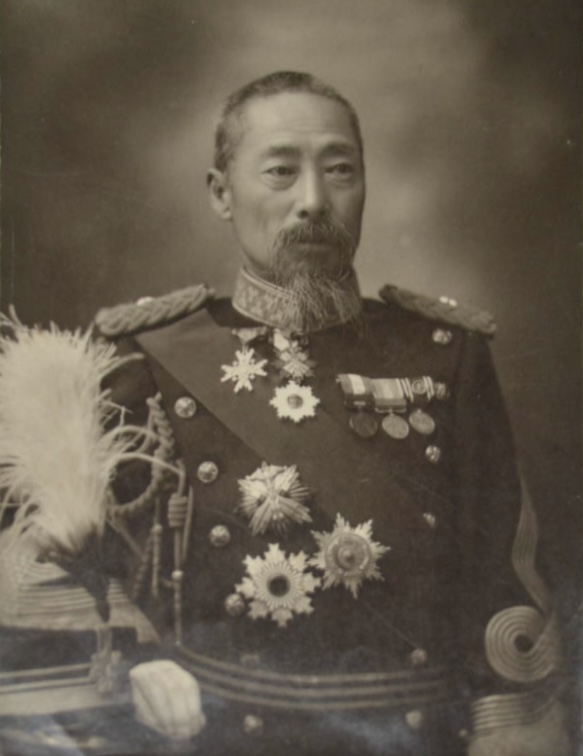
- Born: November 4, 1853; Sendai, Sendai Domain, Japan
- Died: January 10, 1924 (aged 70)
- Military career
- Allegiance: Empire of Japan
- Branch: Imperial Japanese Army
- Rank: Lieutenant General
- Conflicts: Boshin War; Satsuma Rebellion; First Sino-Japanese War; Russo-Japanese War
- Awards: IJA 6th Division

Umezawa Michiharu (梅沢 道治; 4 November 1853 – 10 January 1924) was a Bakumatsu period Japanese samurai who went on to become a general in the Meiji period Imperial Japanese Army.

== Biography ==
Umezawa was born as the second son of a samurai in the service of the Sendai Domain, and attended the domain's academy Yōkendō. During the Boshin War, he fought on the side of the pro-Tokugawa Ōuetsu Reppan Dōmei against the forces of Emperor Meiji, including the Battle of Hakodate. After the war he was taken into custody by the new Meiji government, and following his release in 1869, he enlisted into the fledgling Imperial Japanese Army.

In the Satsuma Rebellion, Umezawa was a member of the IJA 3rd Infantry Regiment. Following the war, his rise through the ranks was rapid, and he became commander of the Guards 2nd Regiment in 1887 with the rank of major.

With the start of the First Sino-Japanese War in 1894, he was assigned to the staff of the IJA 2nd Army, and was in charge of military logistics. he advanced to the rank of lieutenant colonel and was given command of the IJA 40th Infantry Regiment in September 1896. In February 1899 he was promoted to colonel. In March 1900, he was given command of the Guards 4th Regiment.

With the outbreak of the Russo-Japanese War, Umezawa was given a battlefield promotion to major general in July 1904; however, despite his long history of military service, Umezawa was regarded as a mediocre soldier by his superiors, and their lack of expectation was reflected by the fact that he was given command of the Guards Reserve 5th Infantry Brigade. This was a rear-duty garrison force composed primarily of over-age reservists armed with obsolete equipment (some of which was captured Russian weapons) and with low morale. Umezawa defied all expectations by improving morale and turning his second-rate force into a first-rate combat unit. At the Battle of Shaho, the IJA 1st Army became overextended, and the Russians mounted an attack on its exposed right wing. Umezawa's rear-guard brigade was all that was blocking the Russian forces from flanking the Japanese army. Despite an order to withdraw, Umezawa's reserve brigade held for three hours against three times their number of Russian front-line troops. The following morning, the Russians attacked with an even larger force, but the Umezawa Brigade still held. General Kuroki Tamemoto perceived that Umezawa's position was key to preventing a Japanese loss, and sent the IJA 12th Division and the IJA 2nd Cavalry Brigade as reinforcements, which finally turned the battle in Japan's favor. Umezawa was hailed as the hero of the battle, and his troops were given the name "Hana no Umezawa Brigade" He subsequently served as commander of the Reserve Brigade of the Imperial Guards.

In February 1906, Umezawa became commander of the Guards 2nd Brigade. From April to June 1907, he was sent as a military attache to the United States. In September 1911, he was promoted to lieutenant general and became commander in chief of the IJA 6th Division. In May 1914, he was awarded the 1st class of the Order of the Sacred Treasures, which he added to his existing collection of 2nd, 3rd and 4th class Order of the Golden Kite.

Umezawa entered the reserves in October 1915. In his final years, he suffered from rheumatism; he died at the age of 72 in January 1924.

== Decorations ==
- 1906 - Order of the Golden Kite, 2nd class
- 1906 - Order of the Rising Sun, 2nd class
- 1914 - Grand Cordon of the Order of the Sacred Treasure
