= Ueda Arisawa =

Japanese general (1850–1921)

Baron Ueda Arisawa
- 上田 有沢
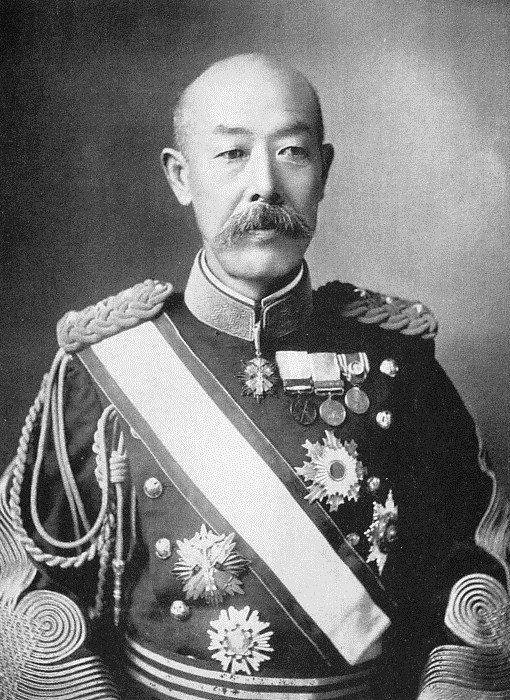
- Born: 27 March 1850; Tokushima Domain, Japan
- Died: 30 November 1921 (aged 71)
- Military career
- Allegiance: Empire of Japan
- Branch: Imperial Japanese Army
- Service years: 1869–1917
- Rank: General
- Conflicts: Boshin War; Satsuma Rebellion; First Sino-Japanese War; Russo-Japanese War

Baron Ueda Arisawa (上田 有沢, Arisawa Ueda; 27 March 1850 – 30 November 1921) was a general in the early Imperial Japanese Army.

== Biography ==
Ueda was born as the second son to a samurai family from Tokushima Domain and as a youth was a samurai in the service of the Hachisuka clan with a revenue of 300 koku. He fought for the clan during the Boshin War of the Meiji restoration and in February 1869 was made a battalion commander in the fledgling Imperial Japanese Army. He was promoted to captain in 1872 and was commanding a regiment in 1875. He participated in the suppression of the Satsuma Rebellion in 1877, serving in various staff positions afterwards, including chief-of-staff of the Kumamoto Garrison from 1884 to 1889 and (after his promotion to lieutenant colonel in November 1889), of the IJA 3rd Infantry Division from 1889 to 1891. In June 1891, he was assigned command of the IJA 22nd Infantry Regiment and was promoted to colonel in November of the same year.

During the First Sino-Japanese War, Ueda was chief-of-staff of the IJA 5th Division, initially under Lieutenant General Nozu Michitsura and later under Lieutenant General Oku Yasukata. Ueda was awarded the Order of the Golden Kite, 4th class for his efforts during the war.

In September 1897, Ueda was promoted to major general and became commandant of the Army Staff College from October 1898. In February 1901, he was appointed commander of the IJA 22nd Infantry Brigade, and was promoted to lieutenant general and chief-of-staff of the Inspectorate General of Military Training in March the following year.

In March 1904, soon after the start of the Russo-Japanese War, Ueda was appointed commander of the IJA 5th Infantry Division and deployed to Manchuria, where he led the division at the Battle of Liaoyang and the Battle of Shaho. However, because of the high losses that his division suffered during storming of Putilov Hill during that battle, he was relieved of his command in November 1904 and reassigned to command the Japanese garrison in Taiwan. However, despite this apparent demotion, he was awarded the Order of the Golden Kite, 2nd class, in 1906, and was transferred to Hokkaido to command the IJA 7th Infantry Division.

In September 1907, Ueda was ennobled with the title of baron (danshaku) under the kazoku peerage system. In December 1908, he became commander of the Imperial Guards Division. In August 1911, Ueda was appointed senior military commander in Korea. He was promoted to general in February 1912 and was promoted to the honorific title of Senior Third Court Rank He entered the reserves later the same year. He retired from service in April 1917,

== Decorations ==
- 1884 - Order of the Rising Sun, 4th class
- 1894 - Order of the Sacred Treasure, 3rd class
- 1895 - Order of the Golden Kite, 4th class
- 1895 - The Order of the Rising Sun, 3rd class
- 1902 - Order of the Sacred Treasure, 2nd class
- 1906 - Grand Cordon of the Order of the Rising Sun
- 1906 - Order of the Golden Kite, 2nd class
