= 9th Rifle Division =

9th Rifle Division can refer to:

- 9th Guards Motor Rifle Division
- 9th Guards Rifle Division
- 9th Siberian Rifle Division
- 131st Separate Motor Rifle Brigade, formerly 9th Rifle Division
- 9th Don Rifle Division, renumbered 38th Rifle Division in 1936

== See also ==
- 9th Division (disambiguation)
