= Ōkubo Haruno =

Japanese general (1846–1915)

Baron Ōkubo Haruno
- 大久保春野
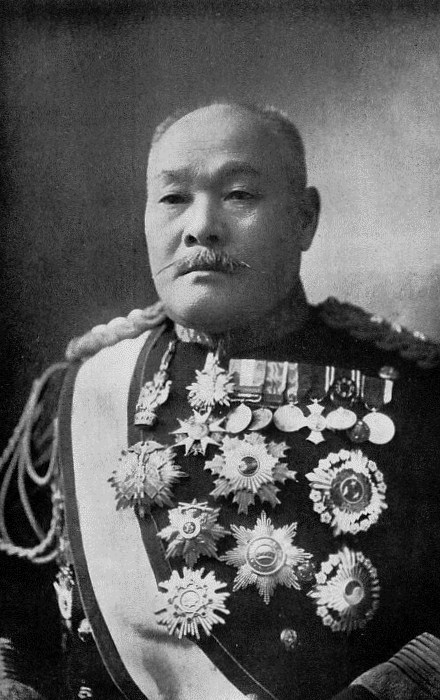
- Haruno in 1913
- Born: October 8, 1846; Mitsuke-juku, Iwata, Tōtōmi, Japan
- Died: January 26, 1915 (aged 68); Shibuya, Tokyo, Japan
- Military career
- Allegiance: Empire of Japan
- Branch: Imperial Japanese Army
- Service years: 1870–1911
- Rank: General
- Conflicts: Boshin War; First Sino-Japanese War; Invasion of Taiwan; Russo-Japanese War

Baron Ōkubo Haruno (大久保 春野; 8 October 1846 – 26 January 1915) was a general in the early Imperial Japanese Army.

== Life and military career ==
Ōkubo was born to a samurai family; his father was descended from the Ōkubo clan, former daimyō of Odawara Domain, who served as hereditary Shinto priests at a shrine in Tōtōmi Province (in what is now Iwata, Shizuoka). Together with his father, he fought as a samurai in the Boshin War of the Meiji restoration.

After the Meiji Restoration, Ogawa attended a military boarding school in Osaka for the fledgling Imperial Japanese Army and was sent to France October 1870 for further training. After his return in July 1875, he served in various staff posts within the Army Ministry. He was made a battalion commander of the IJA 14th Infantry Regiment under the Kumamoto Garrison in May 1880, returning to the Imperial Japanese Army General Staff in December 1882. He was given command of the IJA 12th Infantry Regiment in March 1886 and promoted to colonel in 1889. In June 1890, he became commandant of the Army's Toyama Infantry School, and in June 1891 became commandant of the Imperial Japanese Army Academy.

In 1894, Ōkubo was promoted to major general, and given command of the IJA 7th Infantry Brigade, which saw extensive combat during the First Sino-Japanese War, especially at Hiacheng and Fengcheng in Manchuria. It also participated in the conquest of Taiwan. In December 1897, Ōkubo became commander of the 1st Guards Brigade.

In 1900, Ōkubo was promoted to lieutenant general and chief-of-staff of the Inspectorate General of Military Training. In May 1902, he became commander of the IJA 6th Infantry Division. During the Russo-Japanese War, the IJA 6th Infantry Division was attached to the Japanese Second Army, but after the Battle of Shaho was transferred to the Japanese Fourth Army before the Battle of Mukden. After the war, he was awarded with the Order of the Rising Sun, 1st class and the Order of the Golden Kite, 2nd class. In July 1906, he was transferred to command the IJA 3rd Division and in September 1907 was elevated to the kazoku peerage with the title of danshaku (baron).

After his promotion to full general on 7 August 1908, Ōkubo became commander of the Chosen Army in Korea. He entered the reserves on 18 August 1911. After his death in January 1915, he was posthumously raised to 2nd Court Rank.

== Decorations ==
- 1887 – Order of the Rising Sun, 4th class
- 1895 – Order of the Sacred Treasure, 3rd class
- 1901 – Order of the Rising Sun, 3rd class
- 1905 – Grand Cordon of the Order of the Sacred Treasure
- 1906 – Grand Cordon of the Order of the Rising Sun
- 1906 – Order of the Golden Kite, 2nd class
- 1915 – Order of the Rising Sun with Paulownia Flowers

=== Foreign Orders ===
Korean Empire

- Grand Cordon of the Order of the Plum Blossom in 1909
