= Seishirō Itagaki =

Japanese officer, war criminal 1885-1948

- 板垣 征四郎
- Itagaki in 1938

Minister of the Army
- In office 3 June 1938 – 30 August 1939
- Prime Minister: Fumimaro Konoe; Hiranuma Kiichirō
- Preceded by: Hajime Sugiyama
- Succeeded by: Shunroku Hata

Personal details
- Born: 21 January 1885 Morioka, Iwate, Japan
- Died: 23 December 1948 (aged 63) Sugamo Prison, Tokyo, Japan
- Cause of death: Execution by hanging
- Education: Imperial Japanese Army Academy
- Profession: Military

Military service
- Allegiance: Empire of Japan
- Branch/service: Imperial Japanese Army
- Years of service: 1904–1945
- Rank: General
- Commands: 5th Division; Japanese Korean Army; Seventh Area Army
- Battles/wars: Russo-Japanese War; World War I; Chinese Civil War; Invasion of Manchuria; Mukden Incident; Pacification of Manchukuo; Second Sino-Japanese War; Battle of Beiping–Tianjin; Operation Chahar; Battle of Taiyuan; Battle of Pingxingguan; Battle of Xinkou; Battle of Xuzhou; Battle of Taierzhuang; World War II

General Seishirō Itagaki (板垣 征四郎, Itagaki Seishirō; 21 January 1885 – 23 December 1948) was a Japanese military officer and politician who served as a general in the Imperial Japanese Army during World War II and War Minister from 1938 to 1939.

He was a disciple of Kanji Ishiwara and his ideas were strongly influenced by his apocalyptic Buddhist beliefs, being firmly convinced of the idea of a "Final War" in which Japan would unite the entire world into a single nation, resulting in an era of true peace, regeneration and harmony.

Itagaki was a main conspirator behind the Mukden Incident and held prestigious chief of staff posts in the Kwantung Army and China Expeditionary Army during the early Second Sino–Japanese War. Itagaki became War Minister but fell from grace after Japanese defeat in the Soviet–Japanese border conflicts. Thereafter, he served as general for several field armies until surrendering Japanese forces in Southeast Asia in 1945. Itagaki was ultimately convicted of war crimes by the International Military Tribunal for the Far East and executed in 1948.

== Early life ==
Seishirō Itagaki was born on 21 January 1885 in Morioka, Iwate Prefecture, into a former samurai family that had served the Nanbu clan of the Morioka Domain. Itagaki's father, Masanori Itagaki, served as mayor for Kesen District and as a headmaster for a girls school. Itagaki was raised in a Nichiren Buddhist family belonging to the Nichiren-shū sect. Itagaki attended the junior high school in Morioka (at the same time Kyōsuke Kindaichi, Koshirō Oikawa, and Kodō Nomura) before attending the regional military school in Sendai.

== Military career ==
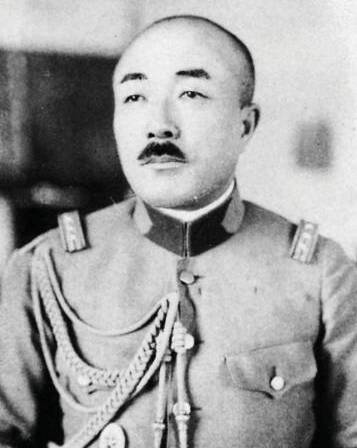
Colonel Seishirō Itagaki (1929-1931)

Itagaki entered the Imperial Japanese Army Academy, where he befriended numerous notable Japanese military figures including Yasuji Okamura, Kenji Doihara, and Tetsuzan Nagata. Itagaki graduated from the Army Academy in 1904 and fought in the Russo–Japanese War. Itagaki married Kikuko Ogoshi, the daughter of his former mentor Kenkichi Ogoshi who died in the Battle of Mukden.

From 1924 to 1926, Itagaki was a military attaché assigned to the Japanese embassy in China. On his return to Japan, he held a number of staff positions within the Imperial Japanese Army General Staff until 1927 before being given a field command as commanding officer of the IJA 33rd Infantry Brigade based in China. His brigade was attached to the IJA 10th Division from 1927 to 1928. Itagaki was then transferred to command the IJA 33rd Infantry Regiment in China from 1928 to 1929, under the aegis of the prestigious Kwantung Army.

In 1931, Itagaki rose to become Chief of the Intelligence Section of the Kwantung Army, in which capacity he helped plan the Mukden Incident that led to the Japanese seizure of Manchuria. Itagaki was subsequently a military advisor to the Japanese puppet state of Manchukuo from 1932 to 1934. In 1934, Itagaki became Vice Chief of Staff of the Kwantung Army, and in 1936 was promoted to Chief of Staff.

From 1937 to 1938, Itagaki was commander of the IJA 5th Division in China during the early stages of the Second Sino–Japanese War, and his division took a leading part in the Battle of Beiping–Tianjin, Operation Chahar, and the Battle of Taiyuan. However, in the Battle of Xuzhou his forces were repulsed during the Battle of Taierzhuang in the vicinity of Linyi that prevented them from coming to the aid of Rensuke Isogai's IJA 10th Division.

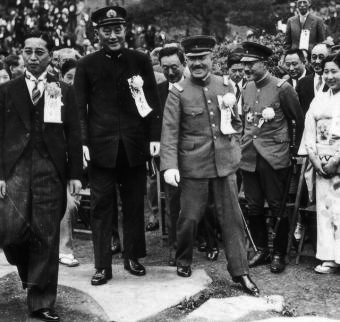
The newly appointed War Minister Itagaki (center, stepping down from the rock) with his vice-minister Hideki Tōjō (right) and Navy minister Mitsumasa Yonai (left, in black Navy uniform, standing on the rock)

Itagaki was recalled to Japan in 1938, briefly serving as War Minister from 1938 to 1939. On 6 December 1938, Itagaki proposed a national policy in accordance with Hakko Ichiu (Expansion) at the Five Ministers Conference, which was the Japanese highest decision making council, and the council made a decision of prohibiting the expulsion of the Jews in Japan, Manchuria, and China as Japanese national policy.

Itagaki returned to China again as chief of staff of the China Expeditionary Army from 1939 to 1941. However, in the summer of 1939, the unexpected defeat of Japanese forces against the Soviet Union at the Battle of Khalkhin Gol or Nomonhan incident, the decisive battle of the Soviet–Japanese border conflicts, was a major blow to his career. On 7 July 1941, Itagaki was reassigned to command the Chosen Army in Korea, then considered to be a non-prestigious backwater post. He was able to prevent Masanobu Tsuji from being cashiered as the Emperor had wished due to Tsuji's insolence and extreme gekokujō during the Nomonhan incident by instead having Tsuji transferred to a research unit at Formosa.

While Itagaki was commander of the Chosen Army, Japan began assembling its nuclear weapons program with the industrial site near the Chosen reservoir as its equivalent to the Oak Ridge laboratory for the United States' Manhattan Project. As the war situation continued to deteriorate for Japan, the Chosen Army was elevated to the Japanese Seventeenth Area Army in 1945, with Itagaki still as commander in chief until 7 April 1945. Itagaki was then reassigned to the Japanese Seventh Area Army in Singapore and Malaya in April 1945. Itagaki surrendered Japanese forces in Southeast Asia to British Admiral Louis Mountbatten in Singapore on 12 September 1945.

== Death ==
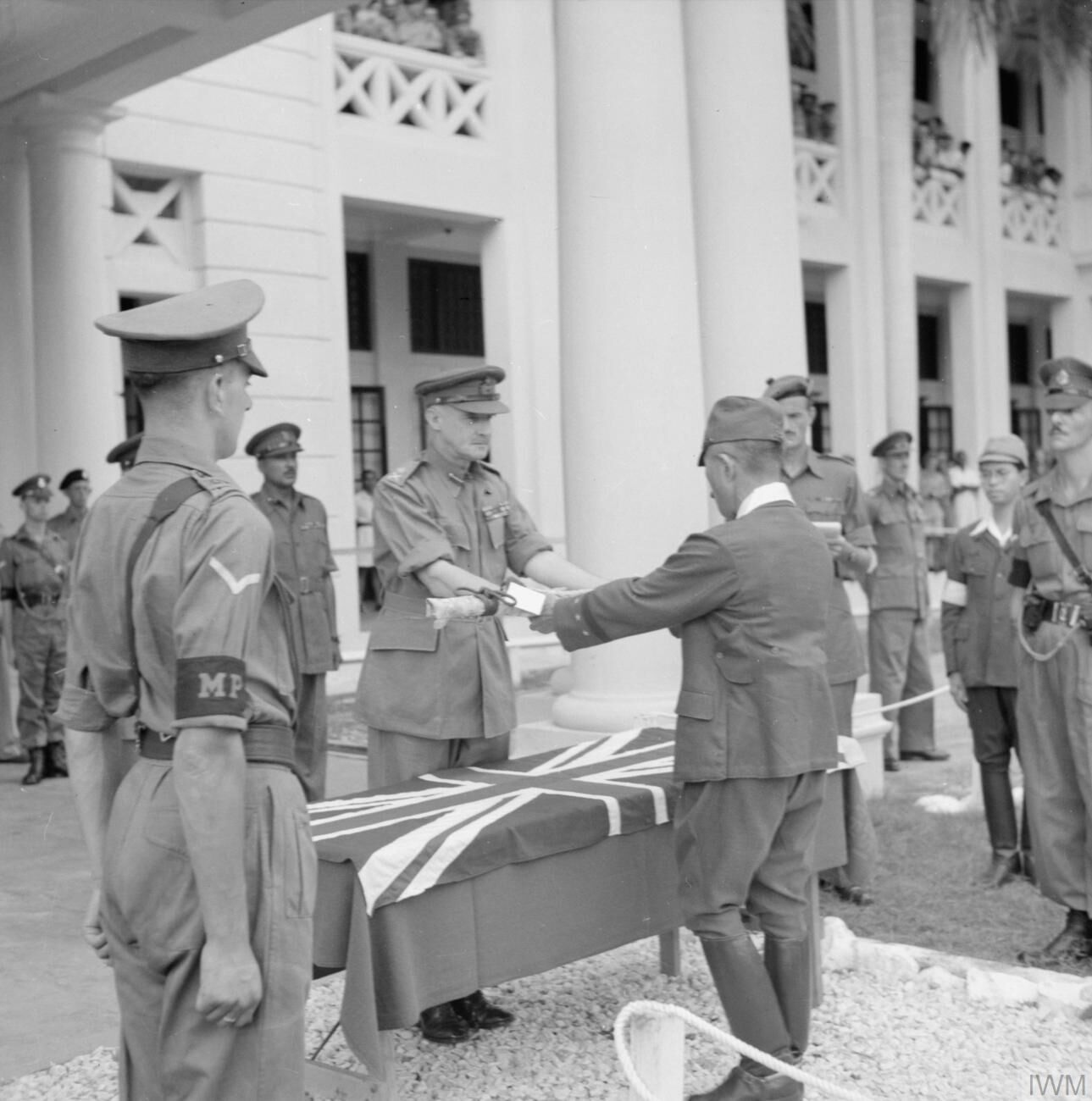
Lieutenant-General Sir Frank Messervy receives the sword of General Seishirō Itagaki, commander of the Japanese Seventh Area Army, at a formal ceremony of surrender held in the grounds of HQ Malaya Command, Kuala Lumpur, 22 February 1946.

After the war, Itagaki was taken into custody by the Supreme Commander of the Allied Powers authorities and charged with war crimes, specifically in connection with the Japanese seizure of Manchuria, his escalation of the war against the Allies during his term as War Minister, and for allowing inhumane treatment of prisoners of war during his term as commander of Japanese forces in Southeast Asia. Itagaki was found guilty on counts 1, 27, 29, 31, 32, 35, 36 and 54 and was condemned to death in 1948 by the International Military Tribunal for the Far East. Itagaki was hanged on 23 December 1948 at Sugamo Prison in Tokyo.

Political offices
Preceded by Hajime Sugiyama	Army Minister; Jun 1938 – Aug 1939	Succeeded by Shunroku Hata
Military offices
Preceded by Kenji Doihara	IJA 7th Area Army; Apr 1945 – Aug 1945	Succeeded by none
Preceded by none	IJA 17th Area Army; Feb 1945 – Apr 1945	Succeeded by Yoshio Kozuki
Preceded by Kotaro Nakamura	IJA Chosen Army; Jul 1941 – Apr 1945	Succeeded by Yoshio Kozuki
