= Nikolai Zarubaev =

Nikolai Platonovich Zarubaev
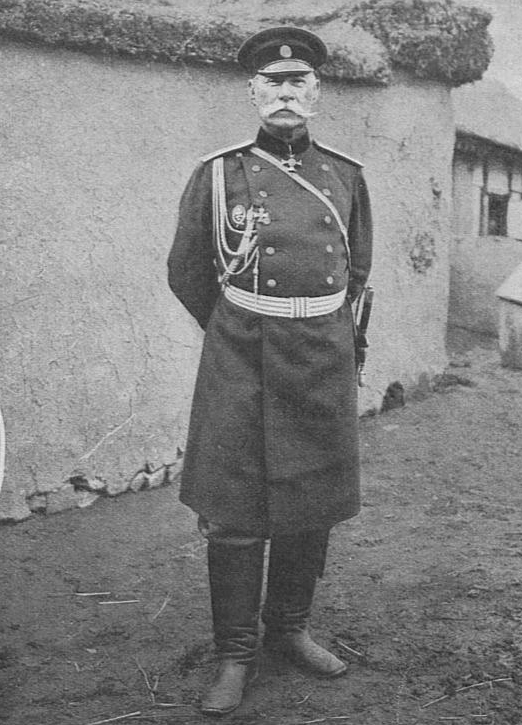
- Native name: Никола́й Плато́нович Заруба́ев
- Nickname: Zarubaev during the Russo-Japanese War
- Born: 1843
- Died: 10 June 1912 (aged 68–69) Kislovodsk, Russia
- Allegiance: Russian Empire
- Branch: Russian Imperial Army
- Service years: 1868–1912
- Rank: Adjutant General
- Conflicts: Russo-Japanese War

Nikolai Platonovich Zarubaev (Russian: Никола́й Плато́нович Заруба́ев 1843–10 June 1912) was an Imperial Russian general in the Imperial Russian Army in Manchuria during the Russo-Japanese War.

== Biography ==
Zarubaev was educated at the Mikhailovsky Voronezh Cadet Corps and Second Constantine Military Academy and commissioned as an officer in the Imperial Guards Grenadier Regiment in 1868. He graduated from the General Staff Academy in 1870, and served in numerous staff positions. He was promoted to colonel in 1875. From 1885-1890, he commanded the 133rd Infantry Regiment.

In 1890, Zarubaev was promoted to major general and in 1899 was promoted to lieutenant general and given command of the 9th Infantry Division from 1900-1903, when he was made Deputy Commander of the Siberian Military District.

At the start of the Russo-Japanese War (1904–1905), Zarubaev was made commander of the Fourth Siberian Army Corps, which was composed of the Second and Third Siberian Reserve Brigades. He successfully repulsed attacks by Japanese general Yasukata Oku during the Battle of Tashihchiao, but was ordered to retreat by General Aleksey Kuropatkin rather than to follow up on his success. Likewise, at the Battle of Liaoyang, he successfully held his position against repeated Japanese attacks, but was again refused reinforcements by Kuropatkin and ordered to retreat. At the Battle of Shaho, his forces were largely held in reserve, and were used to reinforce the line covering Kuropatkin's retreat. During the Battle of Mukden, Zarubaev's forces held their positions for ten days from 12–22 February. From 23 February, Zarubaev commanded a combined force of both the Fourth Siberian Army Corps and the First Siberian Army Corps. However, this combined force was cancelled on 25 February, and after Kuropatkin was replaced by General Nikolai Linevich, Zarubaev was made temporary commander of the Russian First Manchurian Army.

After the end of the war, Zarubaev was seen as one of the prominent generals of the war, and was promoted to Adjutant General of the Infantry, and was awarded the Gold Sword for Bravery and Order of St. George, 4th degree.

From 1906-1909, he served as Inspector-General of the Infantry and chaired a committee tasked to improve the personnel and officer corps of the army. He became commander of the Odessa Military District on 24 December 1909, and died at Kislovodsk on 12 June 1912.
