= Battle of Shaho =

1904 battle of the Russo-Japanese War

Coordinates: 41°35′55″N 123°27′26″E

- Part of the Russo-Japanese War
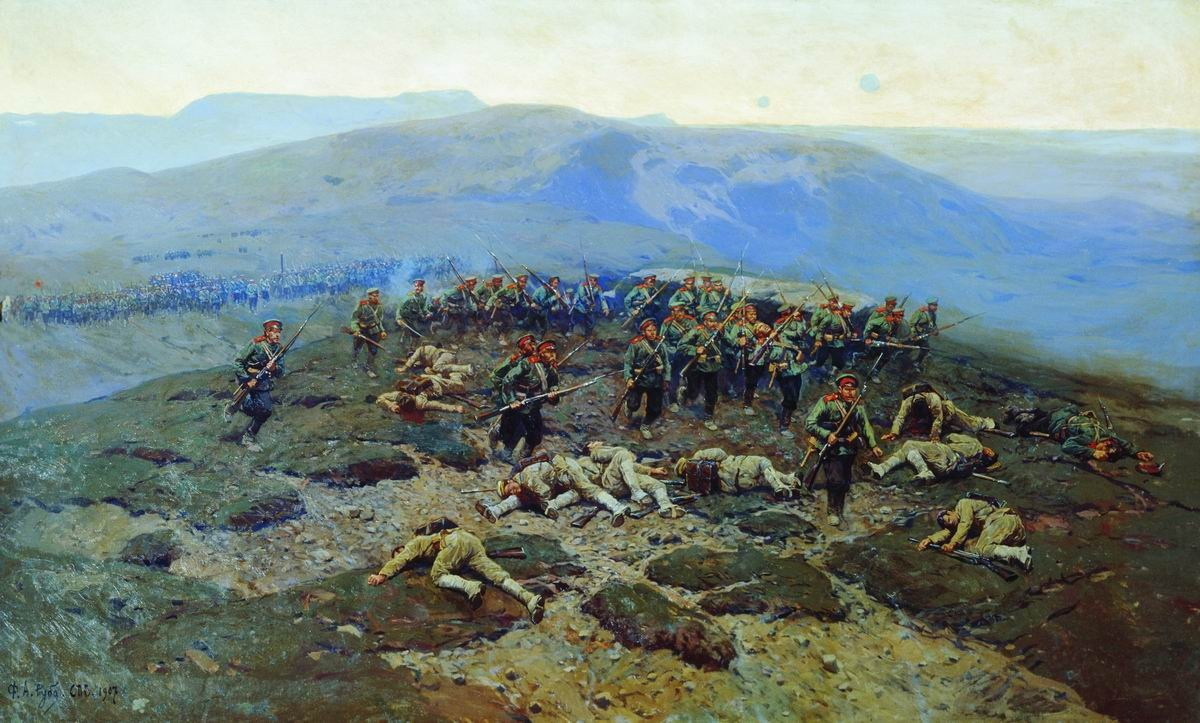
- The Battle of Shaho by Franz Roubaud
Date	5–17 October 1904
Location	South of Mukden on the Sha River, Manchuria
Result	See § Aftermath

Belligerents
Japan	Russia

Commanders and leaders
Ōyama Iwao; Kuroki Tamemoto; Oku Yasukata; Nozu Michitsura; Umezawa Michiharu	Aleksey Kuropatkin

Strength
120,000–170,000	210,000–220,000

Casualties and losses
21,125: 4,099 killed; 16,398 wounded; 628 captured	41,351: 5,084 killed; 30,506 wounded; 4,869 MIA

The Battle of Shaho (Japanese: 沙河会戦 (Saka no kaisen), Russian: Сражение на реке Шахе) was the second large-scale land battle of the Russo-Japanese War fought along a 37-mile (60 km) front centered at the Shaho River along the Mukden–Port Arthur spur of the China Far East Railway north of Liaoyang, Manchuria.

== Background ==
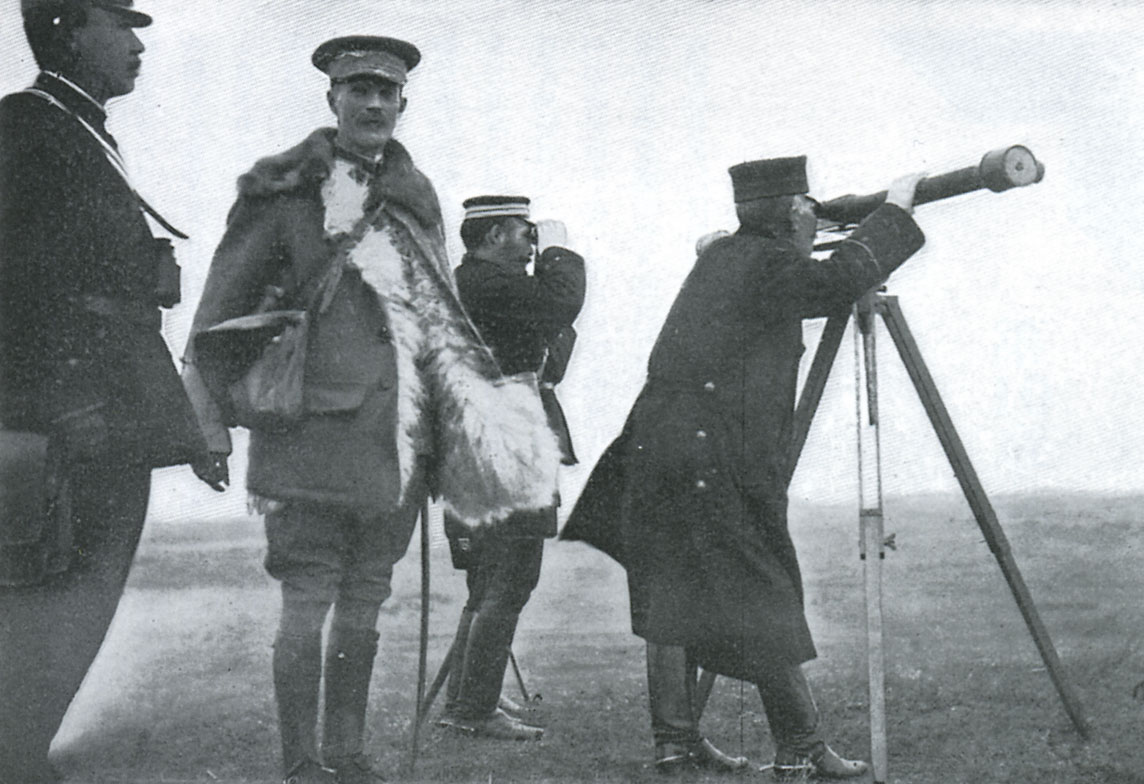
Japanese General Kuroki Tamemoto and British officer Sir Ian Hamilton

After the Battle of Liaoyang the situation for General Alexei Kuropatkin, Commander-in-Chief of the Russian armies in Manchuria became increasingly unfavorable. Kuropatkin had reported a victory at Liaoyang to Tsar Nicholas II in order to secure reinforcements brought in by the newly completed Trans-Siberian Railroad, but the morale of his forces was low, and the besieged Russian garrison and fleet at Port Arthur remained in danger. Should Port Arthur fall, General Nogi Maresuke's Third Army would be able to move northward and join other Japanese forces, enabling the Japanese to achieve numerical superiority. Although he needed to reverse the tide of the war, Kuropatkin was reluctant to move too far from Mukden due to the approach of winter, and the lack of accurate maps.

The Japanese forces commanded by Field Marshal Ōyama Iwao consisted of 170,000 men in 170 battalions, organized into the Japanese 1st Army (General Kuroki Tamemoto) in the east, 2nd Army (General Oku Yasukata) in the west, and 4th Army (General Nozu Michitsura) in the center, and four reserve brigades.

The Russian forces had 210,000 men in nine corps (261 battalions), organized into the Western Detachment (General Alexandr von Bilderling), Eastern Detachment (Lieutenant General Georgii Stackelberg) and reserves, including the First European Army Corps (Lieutenant General Feofil Meyendorf), Fourth Siberian Army Corps (Lieutenant General Nikolai Zarubaev), Sixth Siberian Army Corps (Lieutenant General Sobolev) and the Trans-Baikal Cossack Brigade (Lieutenant General Pavel Mishchenko).

The Russian battle plan was to block the Japanese advance at the Shaho River south of Mukden by turning the Japanese right flank and counterattacking towards Liaoyang with Stackelberg's Eastern Detachment. Simultaneously, Bilderling Western Division was to move south and to cut off Kuroki's IJA 1st Army. The terrain was flat all the way to Liaoyang for the Russian right flank and center, and hilly for the left flank. Unlike previous engagements, the fields of tall kaoliang grains had been harvested, denying the Japanese concealment.

== Battle ==
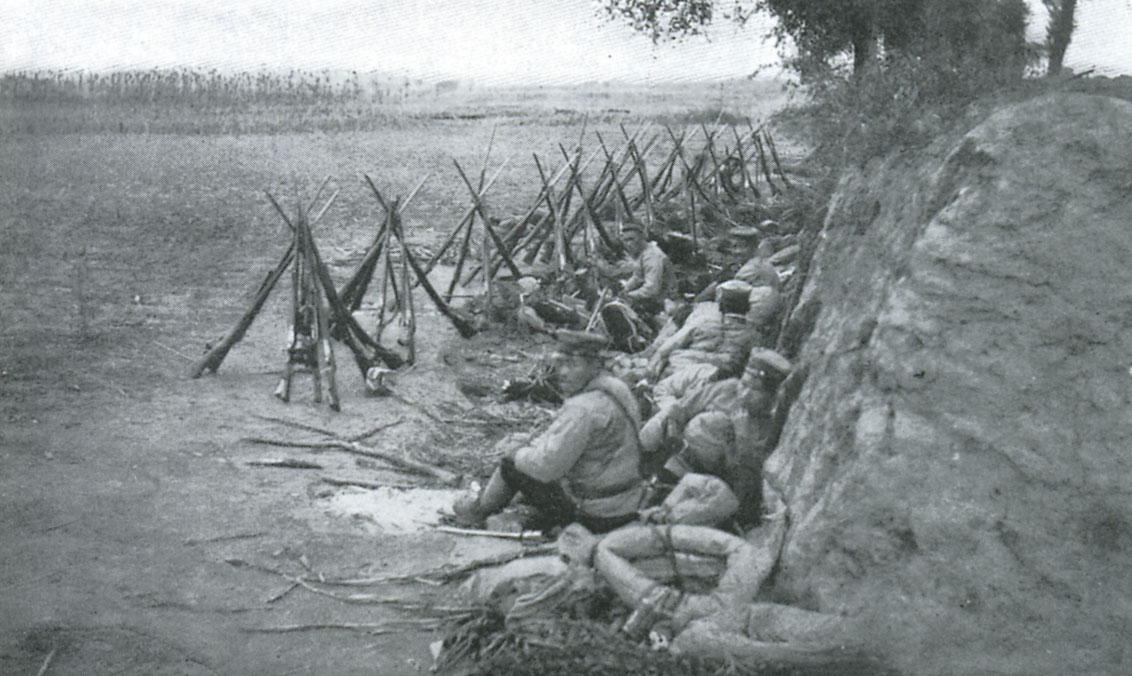
Japanese Troops in the Battle of Shaho.

The battle began on 5 October 1904, with the Russian Western Detachment moving 25 kilometres (16 mi) south across open terrain within minimal opposition, reaching the banks of the Shli River on 7 October. The Russian Eastern Detachment also moved south through mountainous terrain 36 kilometres (22 mi), reaching the hamlet of Bianyupusa on 8 October. Kuropatkin gambled that Ōyama would perceive that the Western Detachment moving down the plains was the main thrust against Liaoyang, whereas his main strike force was actually the Eastern Detachment moving in the concealment of the hills. The ruse initially worked, and Ōyama was reluctant to accept General Kuroki's assessment of the true situation until a copy of Kuropatkin’s written orders to General Stakelberg were discovered on the body of a Russian officer killed in a skirmish on 9 October.

On 10 October, Ōyama ordered a major Japanese counter-offensive aimed at the center of the Russian line. The Japanese battle plan was to use Kuroki’s IJA 1st Army to pin down Stackelberg’s forces while striking hard against Bilderling’s Western Division with IJA 2nd and IJA 4th Armies in flanking maneuvers before Kuropatkin could bring it up to full strength. The Russians suffered heavy casualties in the east and were pushed back in the west, forcing Kuropatkin to commit part of his reserves into a Central Detachment to fill in the gap created. This Central Detachment was made from the First European Army Corps and Fourth Siberian Army Corps.

The IJA 4th Division successfully turned the Russian right flank on 11 October, forcing Bilderling to retreat further. On the left flank, Stackelberg attacked the IJA 12th Division near the Yantai coal mines, and by nightfall had taken 5000 casualties. The IJA 12th Division had lost even more men, but held its ground.

On 12 October, Ōyama ordered Prince Kan'in Kotohito's IJA 2nd Cavalry Brigade against the Russian left flank. The Russians were forced back on the left flank as well. Russian operations were hampered by Kuropatkin's distrust of his generals, and often dispatched orders directly to their subordinates without informing Stackelberg or Bilderling. He also refused to use the field telephone system, so the orders often took several hours to reach their destination by courier.

On the south bank of the river was a small ridge called Sankaiseki-san ("Three Rock Hill") by the Japanese. Although only 100 feet tall, it commanded a wide view of the plains south of Mukden and was regarded as strategically important by the Russians, who had occupied it on 9 October. On the night of 12 October, the IJA 10th Division made a night assault and had taken the hill by early morning of 13 October over stiff opposition.

Also by the morning of 13 October, Stackelberg began to retreat the Eastern Detachment northward after Kuropatkin had refused his request to attack to the west instead. Ōyama committed part of his reserve - Lieutenant General Ueda Arisawa with the IJA 5th Division – in an unsuccessful attempt to cut Stakelberg off. By 14 October, the Japanese had moved across the southern bank of the Shaho River, and the IJA 2nd Army had broken through the Russian lines. The Russians managed to retreat in order, largely through the sacrifice of the Sixth Siberian Army Corps, which took many casualties rear-guarding the retreat.

As Japanese artillery on Sankaisekisan (called "One-Tree Hill" by the Russians) threatened the Russian flank in their retreat, Kuropatkin ordered that it be retaken at all costs. The Russians attacked during the night of 16 October from both ends of the ridge, and had succeeded in taking it by 17 October. Kuropatkin then called off the offensive, and both sides began preparations for the upcoming winter by building fortifications and digging trenches, in some places only a few meters apart.

== Aftermath ==
After two weeks of combat, the battle ended inconclusively strategically. Tactically, the Japanese had advanced 25 kilometers on the road to Mukden, but more importantly had blocked a major Russian counter-offense and effectively ended any hope of relieving the Siege of Port Arthur by land. Total Russian casualties totaled 41,350, including 11,000 killed, captured or missing in action. Japanese casualties totaled 20,345 casualties, with only 4,000 killed or missing.

Despite the failure of the Russian offense, Kuropatkin used his recapture of One-Tree Hill from the Japanese as an excuse to send a telegram to the Tsar proclaiming a Russian victory in the battle. On 25 October, he was rewarded when the Tsar removed Yevgeni Alexeyev from command, and assigned full military command of Russian forces to Kuropatkin.

Despite opportunities created with the opening of the Trans-Siberian Railway, Kuropatkin was unwilling to carry on regardless of casualties. On the other hand, the Japanese were unable to take advantage of the situation, and the Japanese advance on Mukden was paused, as both sides dug in to prepare for the next confrontation at the Battle of Sandepu (Heikoutai).
