= 5th Division (Imperial Japanese Army) =

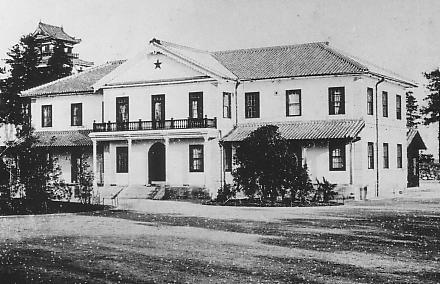
- 5th Division HQ, Hiroshima.
- Active: 1888–1945
- Country: Empire of Japan
- Branch: Imperial Japanese Army
- Type: Infantry
- Size: Division
- Garrison/HQ: Hiroshima City, Japan
- Nickname: "Carp Division"
- Engagements: First Sino-Japanese War Boxer Rebellion Russo-Japanese War Russian Civil War: Battle of Romanovka; World War II

Commanders
- Notable commanders: Ōshima Yoshimasa, Nozu Michitsura, Oku Yasukata, Ueda Arisawa, Aketo Nakamura, Terauchi Hisaichi, Seishirō Itagaki

The 5th Division (第5師団, Dai-go shidan) was an infantry division of the Imperial Japanese Army. Its call sign was the Koi (Carp) Division (鯉兵団, Koihei-dan). The 5th Division was formed in Hiroshima in January 1871 as the Hiroshima Garrison (広島鎮台, Hiroshima chindai), one of six regional commands created in the fledgling Imperial Japanese Army. Its personnel were drafted from Hiroshima, Yamaguchi and Shimane.

== Origin ==
The Hiroshima Garrison had responsibility for the western region of Honshū (Chugoku district), ranging from Hyōgo Prefecture to Yamaguchi Prefecture. The six regional commands were transformed into divisions under the army reorganization of 14 May 1888.

== Operational history ==
The 5th Division entered the First Sino-Japanese War with the battle of Seonghwan on 28 July 1894. It also participated in the battle of Pyongyang on 15 September 1894, securing Japanese control over Korea. On 24 October 1894, the 5th Division made an unopposed crossing of the Yalu River into Chinese territory, encountering only token rearguard resistance and thus ending the Battle of Jiuliancheng on 24 October 1894. It then proceed inland to Mukden) in December 1894. The 5th Division last saw action in this war during the Battle of Yingkou on 4 March 1895, resulting in the peace negotiations and the treaty of Shimonoseki, signed on 17 April 1895.

On 27 January 1900, the 5th Division participated in the Eight-Nation Alliance (of which the Japanese were the only non-Europeans) against the Boxer Rebellion, with a divisional detachment becoming the core of the Gaselee Expedition. Other units of the division garrisoned Tianjing city and Tanggu District. The Japanese combatants won the Battle of Beicang on 5 August 1900 single-handedly. On 14–16 August 1900, the same Japanese combat detachment participated in the Battle of Peking. The division received praise from foreign observers for its bravery, professionalism and discipline.

In the Russo-Japanese War, under the command of General Nozu Michitsura, it saw combat at the Battle of Shaho, the Battle of Sandepu, and the Battle of Mukden.

The division was assigned to Liaoyang, Manchuria from 30 April 1911 until 19 April 1913, when divisional headquarters returned to Hiroshima.

On 24 August 1919, the 5th Division was assigned to the Siberian Intervention at the request of the United States. This mission ended on 24 June 1922 with the unilateral Japanese withdrawal.

=== Second Sino-Japanese War ===
After the Second Sino-Japanese War erupted on 7 July 1937, the 5th Division was assigned to the Japanese China Garrison Army on 27 July 1937 as a combat division. It participated in Operation Chahar on 14–27 August 1937. At the same time, one reinforced regiment was participating in the Beiping–Hankou Railway Operation. Soon afterwards, the division was re-routed to the newly formed Japanese Northern China Area Army on 31 August 1937, fighting in the Battle of Taiyuan, where the 3rd Battalion of the 21st Infantry Regiment suffered severe casualties in the Battle of Pingxingguan on 24 September 1937. On 30 March 1938, the division was assigned to 2nd Army for the Battle of Xuzhou.

19 September 1938, the 5th Division was subordinated to the 21st Army and sent to South China, participating in the Guangdong province offensive capturing Nanning in November 1938. The division was then ordered to return to North China on 29 November 1938 and subordinated to the 12th Army. Plans went awry because the 21st Infantry Brigade was surrounded by the Chinese in the Battle of Kunlun Pass in December 1938. As a consequence, these troops suffered heavy casualties and were delayed until late January 1939. The division returned to 21st Army in South China on 16 October 1939. The 21st Army was reformed to 22nd Army on 9 February 1940. As part of the newly formed army, the 5th Division became the core of the forces allotted for the Japanese invasion of French Indochina on 22 September 1940. After the invasion, the division occupied the northern part of French Indochina.

=== Pacific War ===
With its combat experience and record in China, the 5th Division was considered one of the best units in the Imperial Japanese Army, and on 12 October 1940, it was placed under the direct control of Imperial General Headquarters and started an intensive training program, including paratrooper exercises in Kyushu together with the 5th Air Group. The division was officially assigned to the Nanshin-ron on 9 November 1941, subordinated to 25th Army (Tomoyuki Yamashita), which was part of the Southern Expeditionary Army Group (Field Marshal Terauchi Hisaichi) based in Saigon.

==== Battle of Malaya ====
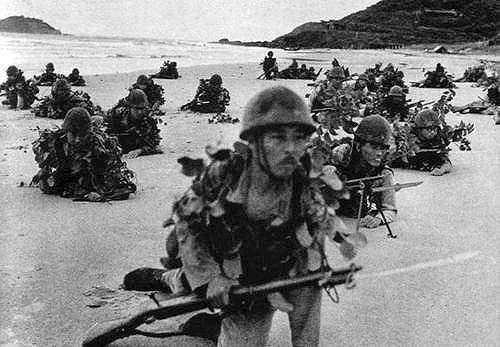
Soldiers of the 5th division landing on a beach during the Malayan invasion, December 1941

The 5th Division landed on the east coast of Thailand at Singora and Patani on December 8, 1941. The 5th Division fought its way through northern and central Malaya. It was particularly successful at the battle of Jitra on 11 December 1941 and the battle of Slim River on 6 January 1942. In both battles, it defeated the Indian 11th Infantry Division. At the Battle of Slim River, the 5th Division's 41st Infantry Regiment, supported by tanks, swept through sixteen miles of British defenses, shattering the exhausted combatants of the 11th Indian Division and inflicting an estimated 3,000 casualties.

The 5th Division did not have it all its own way during the Battle of Malaya, suffering heavy casualties during the Battle of Kampar from 30 December 1941. Nonetheless, the division was able to capture Kuala Lumpur 11 January 1942. After overcoming the stiff resistance of the 8th Australian Division during the Battle of Muar at Gemensah Bridge, the 5th Division has opened the way to Singapore on 22 January 1942.

==== Battle of Singapore ====
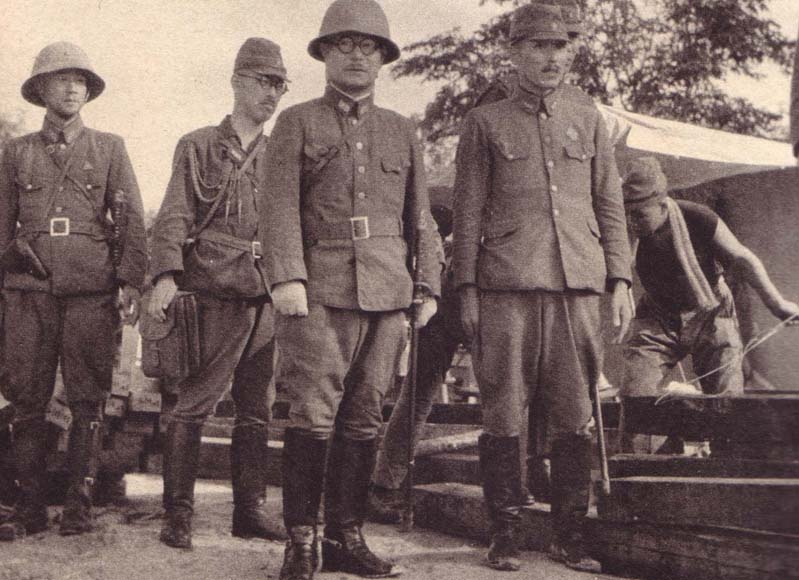
Lieutenant General Matsui Takuro during the battle of Singapore.

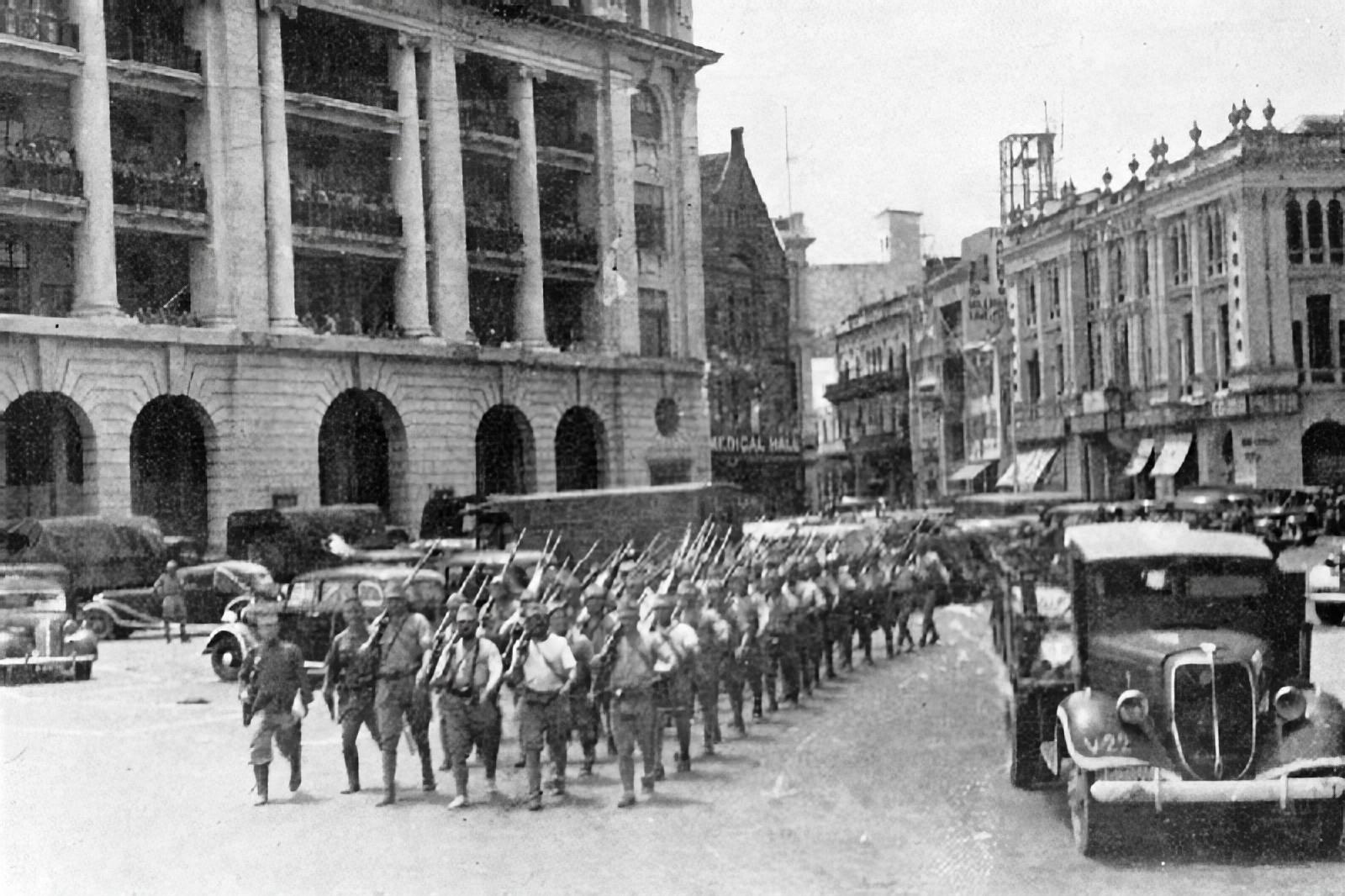
Japanese combatants march victoriously after the battle of Singapore through the city center.

On the night of 8 February 1942, six battalions of the 5th Division, under command of Lieutenant General Matsui Takuro as part of Lieutenant General Yamashita Tomoyuki's 25th Army along with the IJA 18th Division crossed the Johor Strait using landing craft.

On the Singapore side, Sarimbun beach was heavily defended by two companies, one each from the 2/20th and 2/18th Battalions of the 22nd Australian Brigade, supported by a machine gun company, three artillery batteries and an anti-tank battery. However, the Japanese combatants managed to penetrate the British defense perimeter, and the Australian troops retrograded after midnight allowing the 5th Division, to move on to Ama Keng village and established a beachhead, where they fired a red starshell over the straits to indicate their success to General Yamashita.

Immediately after this important victory, the 5th Division moved inwards into Singapore to capture more strategic areas such as Tengah Airfield on 9 February 1942. The unit fought against the 2/29th, 2/20th and 2/18th Battalions of the 22nd Australian Brigade and the Jind Indian Infantry Battalion, the airfield garrison. On 11 February 1942, Bukit Timah Road was captured by the 5th Division after fierce fighting. Singapore surrendered four days later.

==== Philippines Campaign (1941–42) ====
The 41st Infantry Regiment was detached from the division in March 1942, therefore the 5th Division became a triangular division. The 4,160-man strong Kawamura Detachment (comprising an elite part of the 41st Infantry Regiment of 5th Division) landed on Panay island on 16–18 April 1942, resulting in a force of 7,000 U.S.-Filipino combatants retreating from the coast on 20 April 1942. The Kawamura Detachment then proceeded to land on the north coast of Mindanao on 3 May 1942, forcing the surrender of the Americans and Filipinos on 10 May 1942, after heavy fighting.

==== New Guinea campaign ====
The rest of the detached 41st Infantry Regiment re-formed as the Yazawa Detachment, and was initially deployed in Cagayan on north coast of Luzon. It was transferred, landing in Davao City on 28 June 1942, and used to reinforce Nankai Shitai (South Seas Detachment) under command of Major-General Tomitaro Horii. On 18 July 1942, the detachment was reinforced by a company of tanks plus a company of close-support artillery, and ordered to join the thrust to Port Moresby on 31 July 1942. Initially sailing to Rabaul, which was being used as staging point on 16 August 1942, the Yazawa detachment departed on 19 August 1942 on board Kiyokawa Maru and Myoko Maru . They landed at Gona, around the Japanese beachhead, on 21 August 1942. During the battle of Isurava the Yazawa detachment was held in reserve.

After the Battle of Brigade Hill was fought further inland, the Yazawa detachment made its way to the mouth of the Girua River (near Buna), where it secured a landing of the supplies and reinforcements, starting from 23 September 1942. On 29 October 1942, the bulk of the Yazawa detachment took up defensive positions inland near Oivi Creek, to cover the retreat of 144th regiment and other units. The Australians attacked with superior forces on 4 November 1942 during the Battle of Oivi-Gorari, mauling and routing the Yazawa detachment. About 900 combatants left of Yazawa detachment narrowly escaped the encirclement and run away to the heavily wooded Ajura Kijala Range to the north-east on 10 November 1942. The last rearguard covering the Oivi Creek was wiped out 13 November 1942. The Yazawa escapees reached the mouth of the Kumusi River, north of Gona, by 28 November 1942, but the detachment was not combat-ready because of the loss of most of its heavy equipment and the high incidence of malaria amongst its troops. The majority of the malaria-weakened combatants were transported by landing craft to the mouth of Girua River on 29 November 1942, losing hundreds to the Allied air attacks in sea. The more healthy ones joined them after an overland march on 2 December 1942. On 31 December 1942, Colonel Yazawa ordered a desperate rescue mission to the Buna with the composite unit gathered from the jumble of shattered Japanese detachments. Due to the fall of Buna on 2 January 1943 they aborted the mission, but the Yazawa detachment still clashed with Allied combat patrols and rescued about 190 combatants escaping from Buna. As the retreat to Gona on 20 January 1943 failed, the Yazawa detachment ceased to exist, with only a few survivors reaching Japanese lines.

==== Subsequent history ====
In 1943, the division was subordinated to 19th Army. The 5th Division subsequently saw action in Rabaul and Guadalcanal and various islands in the Dutch East Indies before surrendering to the Allies on Ceram, in the Dutch East Indies.

The division was involved with Tachibana Maru incident, comprising hospital ship been used to transport armaments (up to howitzers) and healthy combatants. As result of the incident, about 1,500 prisoners of war of the division were captured by United States 3 August 1945.

=== Divisional headquarters ===
The 5th Division headquarters buildings in Hiroshima Castle were destroyed by the atomic bomb explosion on 6 August 1945. Loss of life was light because the headquarters had departed in March 1945 to reinforce the 125th Division in Manchukuo.

== See also ==
- List of Japanese Infantry Divisions
