= 6th Division (Imperial Japanese Army) =

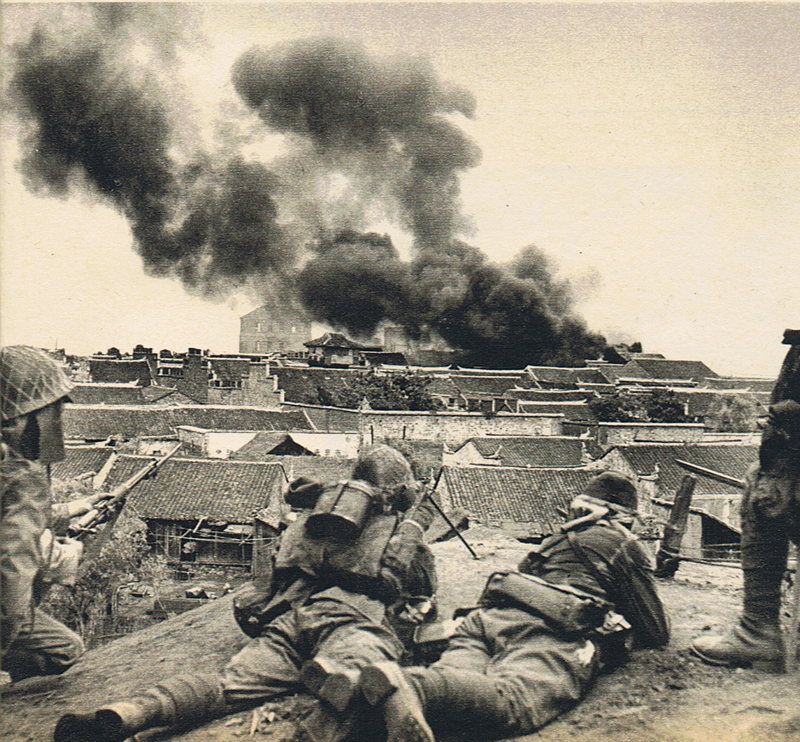
- IJA 23rd Infantry Regiment 2nd Battalion seizing Shāshì city, 8 June 1940
- Active: 1888–1945
- Country: Empire of Japan
- Branch: Imperial Japanese Army
- Type: Infantry
- Garrison/HQ: Kumamoto City, Japan
- Nickname: "Bright Division"
- Engagements: First Sino-Japanese War; Russo-Japanese War; Second Sino-Japanese War; World War II

Commanders
- Notable commanders: Prince Kitashirakawa Yoshihisa, Kuroki Tamemoto, Ōkubo Haruno, Akashi Motojiro, and Sadao Araki

The 6th Division (第6師団, Dai-roku shidan) was an infantry division in the Imperial Japanese Army. Its call sign was the Bright Division (明兵団, Akari-heidan).

== Actions ==
The 6th Division was formed in Kumamoto City on 12 May 1888, as one of the new divisions to be created after the reorganization of the Imperial Japanese Army away from six regional commands and into a divisional command structure, as per the recommendations of the Prussian military advisor Jakob Meckel to the Japanese government. Its troops were drawn primarily from the southern prefectures of Kyūshū.

=== First Sino-Japanese War to Tanggu Truce ===
The division participated in combat during the First Sino-Japanese War at the Battle of Weihaiwei. In the Russo-Japanese War it participated in the Battle of Shaho under the command of the 2nd Army and in the Battle of Mukden under the command of the 4th Army.

On 29 April 1910 the divisional headquarters building was demolished, and the headquarters was assigned temporarily in Kumamoto Kaikosha 22 June 1916 until a new building on the grounds of Kumamoto Castle was completed on 5 April 1917.

In 1923, the division was assigned to garrison duty in Manchuria. The 6th Division returned to Kyushu in 1925, and sent a detachment to participate in the Jinan Incident in 1928. Returned to China in the aftermath of the Mukden Incident in 1931, the division participated in the Defense of the Great Wall in 1933 (being the attacking force in the confrontation), to expand and secure the western flank of the newly formed Manchukuo state.

=== Second Sino-Japanese War ===
With the start of the Second Sino-Japanese War 27 July 1937, the 6th Division was assigned to the Japanese China Garrison Army, and immediately started to act in the ongoing Battle of Beiping–Tianjin. Afterward, it participated in Beiping–Hankou Railway Operation. 20 October 1937, the division was re-subordinated to the 10th Army and attacked the Chinese troops concentration at Hangzhou Bay. By December 1937, it shifted west to participate together with the 18th Division and 114th Division in the Battle of Nanking and ultimately in the Nanjing Massacre. On 14 February 1938, the 6th Division was subordinated to the Central China Expeditionary Army and in May 1938 entered the Battle of Xuzhou. 15 May 1938, the 106th Division was split from the 6th Division. Actions in the Battle of Wuhan began in June 1938, and the division was subsequently withdrawn to Japan. In 1940, the 47th infantry regiment was transferred to the 48th division, converting the 6th Division to the triangular division format.

=== Pacific War ===
In November 1942, the 6th Division was reassigned to the 17th Army on Bougainville Island in the Solomon Islands. Although initially used for the Guadalcanal Campaign, it was ordered by Imperial General Headquarters in 1943 to transfer to the southern part of the Bougainville Island. The division's 13th Infantry Regiment took part in the New Georgia campaign.

The division was defending Cape Torokina when US forces landed there, launching the Bougainville Campaign in November 1943. It was subsequently annihilated on Bougainville in 1945. In March 1944, the division took part in a large-scale counterattack aimed at capturing the Allied perimeter around Torokina. During this action, the division suffered heavy losses (the division's infantry group had 1,787 men remaining alive of 4,923 men initially) and ceased to exist as an organized unit. The parts of division cornered in the Buin district of New Guinea suffered heavily from the loss of supplies and food. Losses mounted after the Australians started another offensive in November 1944. The surrender document was signed in September 1945 on the nearby Fauro Island.

== See also ==
- List of Japanese Infantry Divisions

== References and further reading ==
- Madej, W. Victor. Japanese Armed Forces Order of Battle, 1937–1945 [2 vols] Allentown, PA: 1981
- Rottman, Gordon L. (2005). Duncan Anderson (ed.). Japanese Army in World War II: The South Pacific and New Guinea, 1942–43. Oxford and New York: Osprey. ISBN 1-84176-870-7.
- This article incorporated material from the Japanese Wikipedia page 第6師団 (日本軍)
