= 9th Siberian Rifle Division =

9th East Siberian Rifle Brigade 9th East Siberian Rifle Division 9th Siberian Rifle Division
- Russian: 9-я Сибирская стрелковая дивизия Latin: 9-ya Sibirskaya strelkovaya diviziya
- Active: 1904–1917
- Country: Russian Empire
- Branch: Imperial Russian Army
- Type: Military Command
- Size: Division
- Part of: 4th Siberian Army Corps
- Garrison/HQ: Vladivostok
- Engagements: Boxer Rebellion: Russian invasion of Manchuria; Great War: Defense of the Motherland

The 9th Siberian Rifle Division (Russian: 9-я Сибирская стрелковая дивизия, Latin: 9-ya Sibirskaya strelkovaya diviziya) was a military formation of the Imperial Russian Army which participated all major wars of the army in the early 19th century.

== History ==
On 30 January 1904, as part of the Russian invasion of Manchuria, the 9th East Siberian Rifle Brigade was formed as part of the also recently formed 1st Siberian Army Corps of the new Manchurian Army. On 12 January 1904 the corps joined the 1st Manchurian Army and was subsequently renamed as the 9th East Siberian Rifle Division, but by 1906 was removed entirely from any assignments. Though remained under administrative control of the Amur Military District.

On 20 February the brigade and its subordinate units were retitled as 'Siberian Rifle', and the brigade was renamed as the 9th Siberian Rifle Division. In September 1910 the division join the 4th Siberian Army Corps, headquartered in Vladivostok.

During the Great War, the division saw service in the Polish Campaign in 1915, and from 1917 was on the Romanian Front when the February Revolution occurred. Later that year, after the October Revolution the division was disbanded in March 1918 in Odessa.

== Composition in 1914 ==
The composition of the division in 1914 was as follows:

- 9th Siberian Rifle Division
  - Divisional Headquarters, at Vladivostok Fortress
  - 1st Brigade, in Vladivostok
    - 33rd Siberian Rifle Regiment
    - 34th Siberian Rifle Regiment
  - 2nd Brigade, in Vladivostok
    - 35th Siberian Rifle Regiment
    - 36th Siberian Rifle Regiment
  - 9th Siberian Rifle Artillery Brigade (General–Feldzeugmeister Grand Duke Mikhail Nikolaevich's), in Vladivostok — Raised 15 February 1904
    - 6 Field Artillery Batteries
    - 2 Mountain Artillery Batteries
    - 9th Siberian Rifle Field and Mountain Artillery Parks

== Senior Officers ==
Commanding Officers of the Division

- 21 January 1904—4 July 1906: Major General, later Lieutenant General Kiprian Antonovich Kondratovich
- 4 July 1906—5 March 1910: Lt Gen Alexander Nikolaevich Lebedev
- 5 March 1910—26 February 1915: Lt Gen Aleksey Mikhailovich Slezkin
- 3 July 1915—after 1 January 1916: Lt Gen Iosif Ilyich Regulsky

Chiefs of Staff

- 2 April 1906—23 November 1908: Colonel Mikhail Konstantinovich Samoilov
- 26 November 1908—24 July 1912: Col Nikolay Nikolaevich Desino
- 24 July 1912—1 March 1914: Col Vladimir Alexandrovich Tarakanov
- 23 February 1915—8 January 1916: Col Dmitry Alexandrovich Betkher

1st Brigade Commanders

- 24 May 1906—27 June 1906: Major General Leonid Vigelmovich Lesh
- 16 January 1913—7 January 1913: Maj Gen Mikhail Konstantinovich Samoilov
- 7 April 1913—6 January 1914: Maj Gen Lavr Geogievich Kornilov

2nd Brigade Commanders

- 5 November 1908—3 May 1913: Major General Alexander Semenovich Ogloblev
- by 3 January 1914: Maj Gen Fleming
- by 29 July 1917: Vladimir Alekseevich Kolomeytsev
