= Oku Yasukata =

Japanese field marshal (1847–1930)

Junior First Rank Count Oku Yasukata
- 奥 保鞏
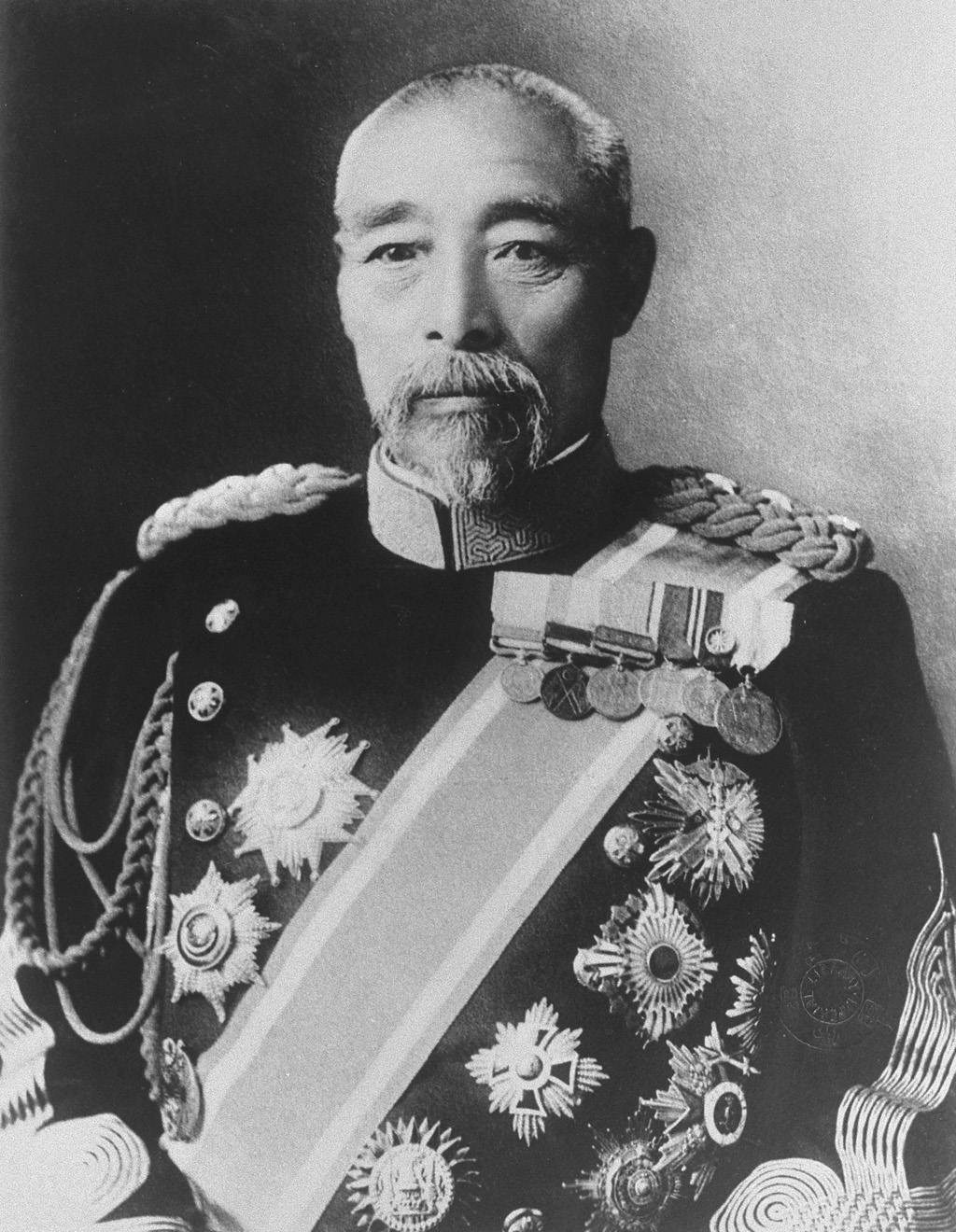

Chief of the Imperial Japanese Army General Staff Office
- In office 30 July 1906 – 20 January 1912
- Monarch: Meiji
- Preceded by: Kodama Gentarō
- Succeeded by: Hasegawa Yoshimichi

Personal details
- Born: 5 January 1847 Kokura, Buzen, Japan
- Died: 19 July 1930 (aged 83) Tokyo, Japan
- Awards: Order of the Golden Kite (1st class)

Military service
- Allegiance: Empire of Japan
- Branch/service: Imperial Japanese Army
- Years of service: 1871–1911
- Rank: Field Marshal
- Commands: IJA 5th Division, IJA 1st Army, Imperial Guard of Japan, IJA 2nd Army
- Battles/wars: First Chōshū expedition; Second Chōshū expedition; Boshin War; Taiwan Expedition of 1874; Saga Rebellion; Satsuma Rebellion; Siege of Kumamoto Castle; First Sino-Japanese War; Russo-Japanese War; Battle of Nanshan; Battle of Te-li-Ssu; Battle of Tashihchiao; Battle of Liaoyang; Battle of Shaho; Battle of Sandepu; Battle of Mukden

Count Oku Yasukata (奥 保鞏; 5 January 1847 – 19 July 1930) was a Japanese field marshal and leading figure in the early Imperial Japanese Army.

== Biography ==
=== Early life ===
Born in Kokura (in present-day Kitakyūshū) to a samurai family of the Kokura Domain in Buzen Province, Oku joined the military forces of the nearby Chōshū Domain during the First and Second Chōshū expeditions and the Boshin War in their struggle to overthrow the Tokugawa shogunate and bring about the Meiji Restoration.

=== Military career ===
Appointed a commander of the new Imperial Japanese Army, Oku fought against the disgruntled samurai insurgents during the Saga Rebellion of 1871. He was later a survivor of the Taiwan Expedition of 1874. During the Satsuma Rebellion, he defended Kumamoto Castle during its siege as commander of the 13th Infantry Regiment.

During the First Sino-Japanese War Oku succeeded General Nozu Michitsura commander of the IJA Fifth Division of the IJA First Army. Later, he successively held posts as commander of the Imperial Guards and Governor-general for the defense of Tokyo. He was elevated to the title of danshaku (baron) under the kazoku peerage system in 1895, and was promoted to army general in 1903.

During the Russo-Japanese War, Oku went to the front as commanding general of the IJA 2nd Army and was noted for his role in the Battle of Nanshan, Battle of Shaho, Battle of Mukden, and other campaigns.

Oku was awarded the Order of the Golden Kite (1st class) in 1906, and elevated from baron to hakushaku (count) in 1907. In 1911, he received the largely honorary rank of Field Marshal.

Oku refused to attend any strategy and staff meetings, and thereby gained a reputation for being both a "lone wolf" and also a brilliant tactician capable of independent action. However, Oku's reluctance to attend the staff meetings was due to his partial deafness, and inability to comprehend and contribute to the discussions.

=== Post-war life ===
Oku had absolutely no interest in politics, and lived in virtual seclusion after the war. When he died of an Intracranial hemorrhage in 1930, many people were astonished, thinking that he had died years previously.

== Decorations ==
- 1878 – Order of the Rising Sun, 4th class
- 1885 – Order of the Rising Sun, 3rd class
- 1893 – Order of the Sacred Treasure, 2nd class
- 1895 – Order of the Rising Sun, 2nd class
- 1895 – Order of the Golden Kite, 3rd class
- 1900 – Grand Cordon of the Order of the Sacred Treasure
- 1905 – Grand Cordon of the Order of the Rising Sun
- 1906 – Order of the Golden Kite, 1st class
- 1906 – Order of the Rising Sun with Paulownia Flowers
- 1928 – Order of the Chrysanthemum
