= Yoshio Kozuki =

Commander in the Imperial Japanese Army

- 上月 良夫
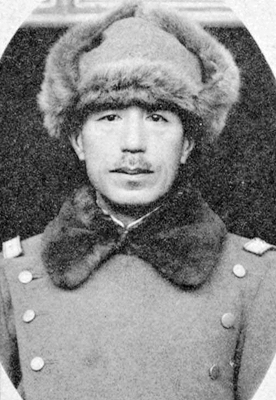
- Born: November 7, 1886; Kumamoto Prefecture, Japan
- Died: April 3, 1971 (aged 84)
- Military career
- Allegiance: Empire of Japan
- Branch: Imperial Japanese Army
- Service years: 1909–1945
- Rank: Lieutenant General
- Commands: 19th Division; 2nd Army; Mongolia Garrison Army; 11th Army; 17th Area Army
- Conflicts: Second Sino-Japanese War; World War II
- Other work: Vice Minister of Demobilization; Head of the Demobilization Bureau

Yoshio Kozuki (上月 良夫, Kōzuki Yoshio; November 7, 1886 – April 3, 1971) was a Lieutenant General in the Imperial Japanese Army, who commanded the 17th Area Army in Korea from April 1945 until the end of World War II.

== Life ==
Yoshio Kozuki became an infantry officer in 1909 and was a language officer in Germany. He served in several positions until August 1940, when he became commander of the 19th Division, based in Korea.

On July 4, 1942, he was appointed Commander of the 2nd Army based in Manchukuo. On May 28, 1943, he took command of the Mongolia Garrison Army. In November 1944, he became Commander of the 11th Army and in April 1945 of the Seventeenth Area Army in Korea, which was demobilized in August 1945 without having seen combat.

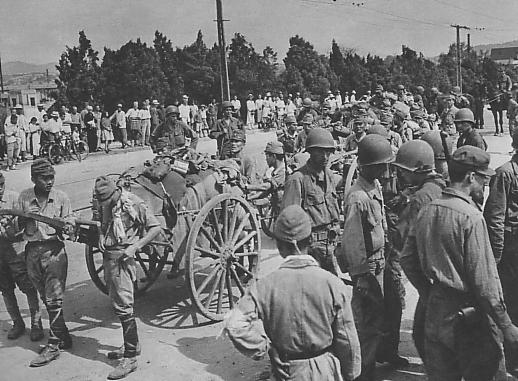
Withdrawal of Japanese troops from Korea

After the war, he was Vice Minister of Demobilization and in 1947, he became Head of the Demobilization Bureau, which fell under the Ministry of Health and Welfare.
