= 4th Siberian Army Corps =

- Active: 1904–1905, 1912–1918
- Country: Russian Empire
- Branch: Russian Imperial Army
- Role: Infantry
- Engagements: Russo-Japanese War; World War I

The 4th Siberian Army Corps was an Army corps in the Imperial Russian Army. In 1915, she took part in the Narew Offensive.

== Composition ==
1905:

- 2nd Siberian Rifle Division
- 3rd Siberian Rifle Division

1914:

- 9th Siberian Rifle Division
- 10th Siberian Rifle Division

== Part of ==
- 1st Manchurian Army: 1904–1906
- 12th Army: 1915
- 2nd Army: 1915–1916
- 3rd Army: 1916
- 8th Army: 1916
- 6th Army: 1916–1917

== Commanders ==
- 1904–1905: Nikolai Zarubaev
- 1912–1913: Arkady Nikanorovich Nishenkov
- 1913–1915: Sergey Sergeevich Savvich
- 1915: Sychyovsky
- 1915–1917: Otto Leonidas Sirelius
- 1917: Sokolov
