= Second Army (Japan) =

Japanese Second Army
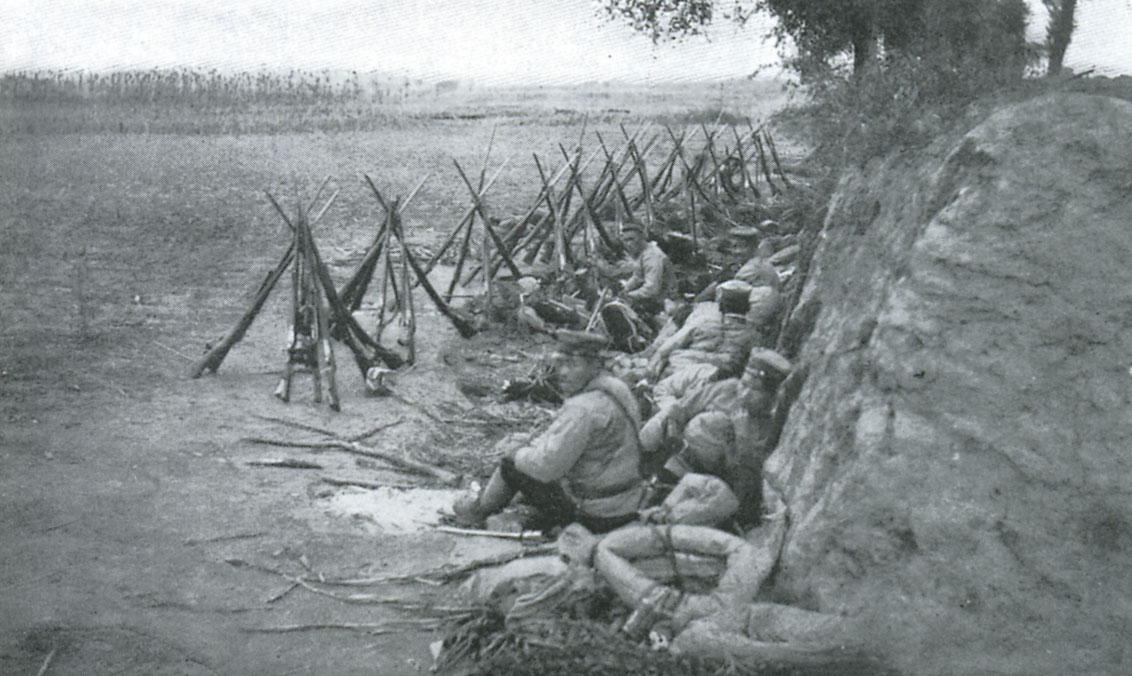
- Japanese Troops in the Battle of Shaho
- Active: Sept 1894-Aug 1945
- Country: Empire of Japan
- Branch: Imperial Japanese Army
- Type: Infantry
- Size: Corps
- Part of: Second Area Army (1942-1945)
- Nicknames: Ikioi (勢, Vigorous)
- Engagements: First Sino-Japanese War; Russo-Japanese War; Second Sino-Japanese War; World War II

The Japanese 2nd Army (第2軍, Dai-ni gun) was a corps of the Imperial Japanese Army. It was raised and demobilized on four occasions.

== History ==
The Japanese 2nd Army was initially raised during the First Sino-Japanese War from September 27, 1894, to May 14, 1895, under the command of General Ōyama Iwao.

It was revived for the Russo-Japanese War from March 6, 1904, to January 2, 1906, under the command of General Oku Yasukata. It fought in most of the major campaigns of the war, including the Battle of Nanshan, Battle of Te-li-Ssu, Battle of Tashihchiao, Battle of Shaho, Battle of Liaoyang, Battle of Sandepu, and Battle of Mukden.

The Japanese 2nd Army was raised again on August 23, 1937, and placed under the command of the Japanese Northern China Area Army as reinforcement to Japanese forces in China following the Marco Polo Bridge Incident. The 2nd Army participated in the North China Incident, Tianjin–Pukou Railway Operation, Battle of Xuzhou and Battle of Taierzhuang before being demobilized on December 15, 1938.

The fourth and final incarnation of the Japanese 2nd Army was on July 4, 1942, when it was revived under the command of the Japanese First Area Army in Manchukuo. It was transferred to the Japanese Second Area Army on October 30, 1943. Towards the closing stages of the war, on June 30, 1945, it was transferred to the Southern Expeditionary Army Group and was based in the Celebes at the end of World War II.

== List of commanders ==
=== Commanding officer ===
	Name	From	To
1	Marshal Ōyama Iwao	25 September 1894	26 May 1895
X	demobilized	26 May 1895	6 March 1904
2	General Oku Yasukata	6 March 1904	12 January 1906
X	demobilized	12 January 1906	23 August 1937
3	General Toshizō Nishio	23 August 1937	30 April 1938
4	General Prince Higashikuni Naruhiko	30 April 1938	9 December 1939
x	demobilized	9 December 1938	4 July 1942
5	Lieutenant General Yoshio Kozuki	4 July 1942	28 May 1943
6	Lieutenant General Ichirō Shichida	28 May 1943	29 October 1943
7	Lieutenant General Fusatarō Teshima	29 October 1943	15 August 1945

=== Chief of Staff ===
	Name	From	To
2	Colonel Inoue Hikaru	1 October 1894	14 May 1895
X	demobilized	26 May 1895	6 March 1904
2	Major General Ochiai Toyosaburo	6 March 1904	12 September 1904
3	Major General Ōsako Naomichi	12 September 1904	18 January 1906
X	demobilized	18 January 1906	31 August 1937
4	Major General Yorimichi Suzuki	31 August 1937	11 June 1938
5	Lieutenant General Kazumoto Machijiri	11 June 1938	21 November 1938
6	Major General Shigenari Aoki	21 November 1938	9 December 1938
X	demobilized	9 December 1938	1 July 1942
7	Major General Goro Isoya	1 July 1942	8 April 1943
8	Major General Ichimaro Horike	8 April 1943	23 October 1943
9	Major General Shikao Fujitsuka	23 October 1943	26 December 1944
10	Major General Yuki Fukabori	1 February 1945	7 April 1945
11	Major General Shintarō Imada	7 April 1945	24 May 1945
12	Major General Minetarō Yoshida	5 June 1945	15 August 1945
