= Nozu Michitsura =

Japanese field marshal (1840–1908)

Marquess Nozu Michitsura
- 野津 道貫
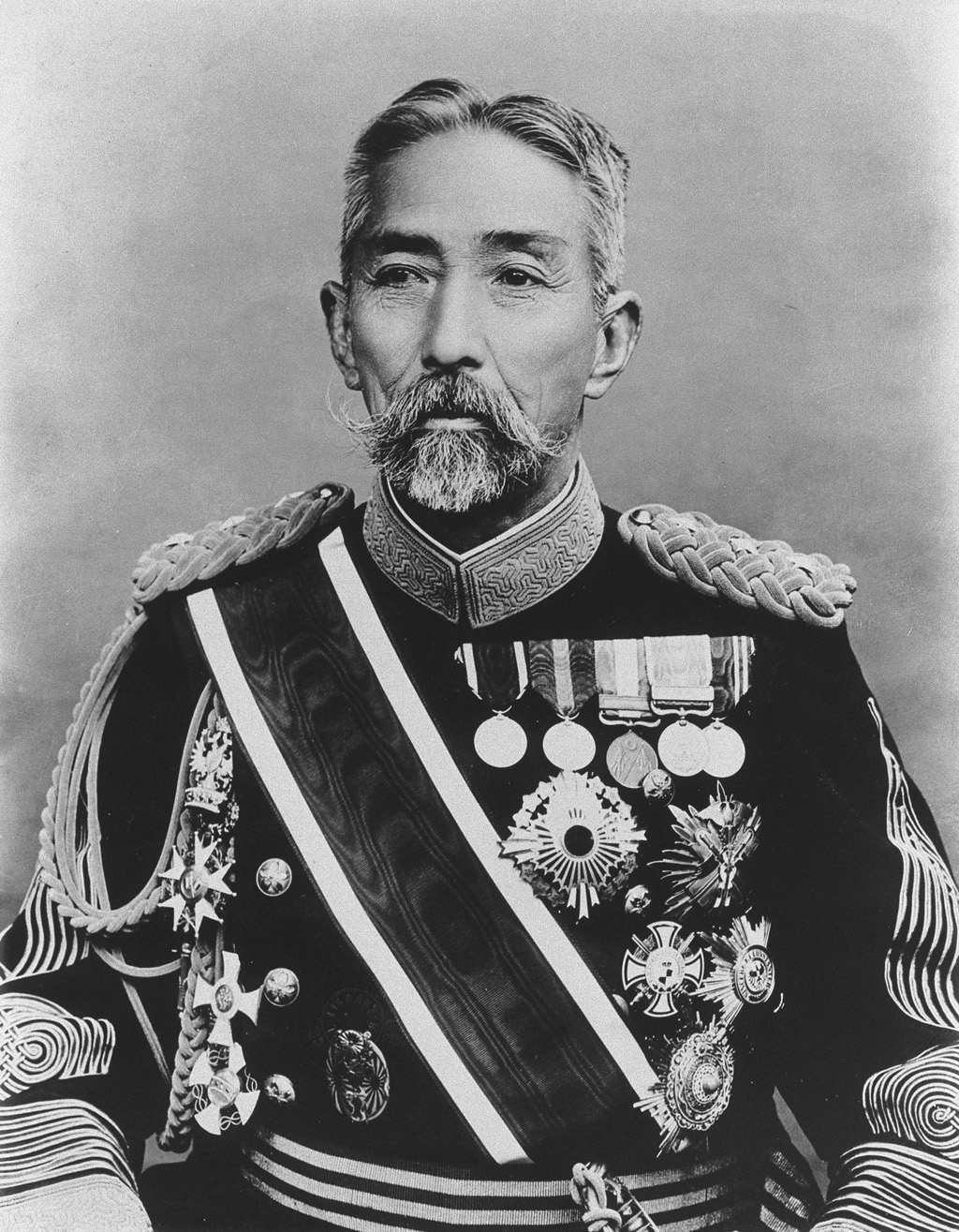
- Born: 17 December 1840; Kagoshima, Satsuma, Japan
- Died: 18 October 1908 (aged 67); Akasaka, Tokyo, Japan
- Burial place: Aoyama Cemetery
- Military career
- Allegiance: Empire of Japan
- Branch: Imperial Japanese Army
- Service years: 1861–1906
- Rank: Field Marshal
- Commands: Imperial Japanese Army
- Conflicts: Boshin War; Satsuma Rebellion; First Sino-Japanese War; Russo-Japanese War
- Awards: Order of the Golden Kite (1st class); Grand Cordon of the Supreme Order of the Chrysanthemum

Member of the House of Peers
- In office September 1907 – 18 October 1908 Nominated by the Emperor

Field Marshal Marquess Nozu Michitsura (野津 道貫; 17 December 1840 – 18 October 1908) was a Japanese field marshal and leading figure in the early Imperial Japanese Army.

== Biography ==
Nozu was born in Kagoshima as the second son of a low-ranking samurai of the Satsuma Domain. He studied Japanese swordsmanship under Yakumaru Kaneyoshi, a noted instructor within Satsuma Domain, and was appointed a company commander during the Boshin War of the Meiji Restoration. Nozu was at every major battle in the war, from the Battle of Toba–Fushimi, to the Battle of Aizu and the Battle of Hakodate.

After the war, Nozu went to Tokyo, and in March 1871, was appointed as a major in the 2nd Brigade of the fledgling Imperial Japanese Army. He was promoted to lieutenant colonel in August 1872, and colonel in January 1874 upon his appointment as chief of staff of the Imperial Guards Brigade. From July to October 1876, Nozu traveled to the United States, where he attended the Centennial Exhibition in Philadelphia. Soon after his return to Japan, he had the unpleasant task of fighting against his former Satsuma clansmen in the Satsuma Rebellion. In February 1877, Nozu was appointed chief of staff of the 2nd Brigade, and was stationed in Bungo Province, in Kyushu – the heartland of the rebellion, from May to August 1877.

In November 1878, Nozu was promoted to major general, and subsequently served as commander of the Tokyo Military District. In February 1884, Nozu accompanied War Minister Ōyama Iwao, on a year-long tour of Europe to examine the military systems of various European nations. In July 1884, he was elevated to the title of baron (danshaku) in the kazoku peerage system by Emperor Meiji. From February to April 1885, Nozu was sent to Beijing in Qing Dynasty China as a military attaché. On his return to Japan in May 1885, he was promoted to lieutenant general and made commander of the Hiroshima Military District.

In May 1888, with the reorganization of the Imperial Japanese Army into divisions per the advice of Prussian military advisor Jakob Meckel, Nozu was made commander of the new IJA 5th Division, which saw combat under his command in the First Sino-Japanese War at the Battle of Pyongyang (1894). In March 1895, Nozu was promoted to full general and replaced General Yamagata Aritomo as command-in-chief of the Japanese First Army in Manchuria. In August 1895, he was elevated to the title of viscount (shishaku).

After the end of the war, Nozu he successively held various military posts including Commander of the Imperial Guard Division, Inspector-General of Military Training, and served as a Military Councilor.

With the start of the Russo-Japanese War, Nozu was assigned command of the Japanese Fourth Army, which played a crucial role in the Battle of Mukden. At the end of the war, he received promotion to the post of field marshal in January 1906. His title was also upgraded to marquis (koshaku).

By Imperial appointment, Nozu served as a member of the House of Peers of the Diet of Japan from September 1907 until his death in October 1908.

Nozu's decorations included the Order of the Golden Kite (1st class) and the Grand Cordon of the Supreme Order of the Chrysanthemum.

His grave is at the Aoyama Cemetery in downtown Tokyo.
