= Kodama Gentarō =

Japanese general (1852–1906)

Viscount Kodama Gentarō
- 兒玉 源太郎
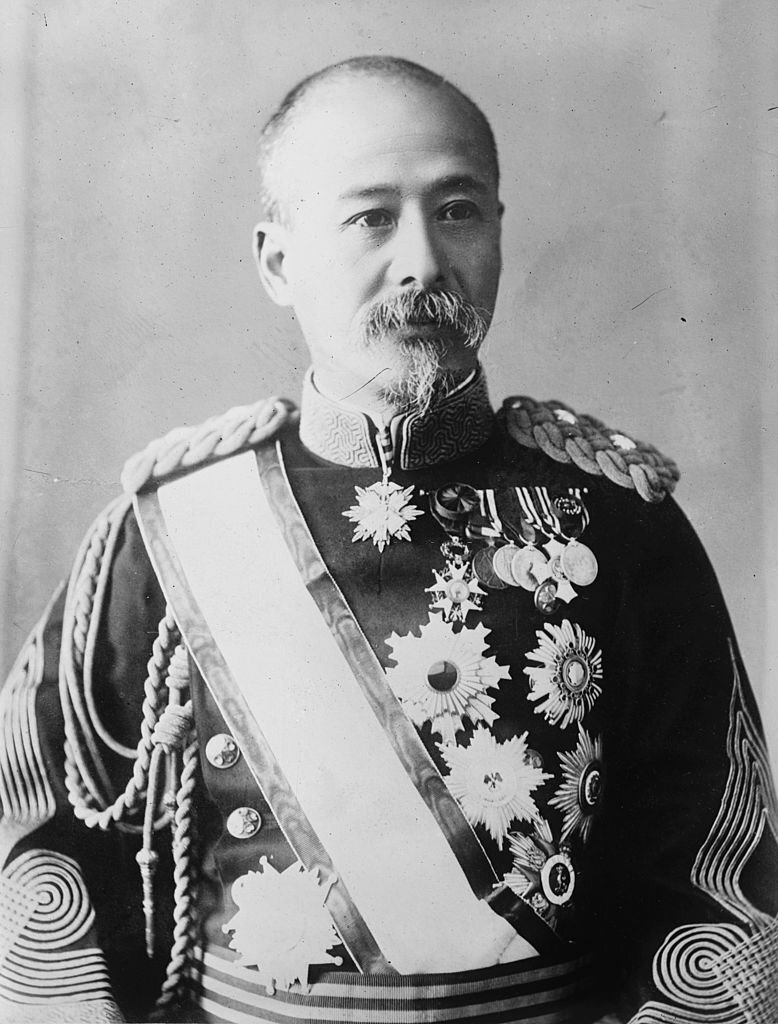

Chief of the Army General Staff
- In office 11 April 1906 – 30 July 1906
- Monarch: Meiji
- Preceded by: Ōyama Iwao
- Succeeded by: Oku Yasukata

4th Governor-General of Taiwan
- In office 26 February 1898 – 11 April 1906
- Monarch: Meiji
- Preceded by: Nogi Maresuke
- Succeeded by: Sakuma Samata

Minister of Home Affairs
- In office 15 July 1903 – 12 October 1903
- Prime Minister: Katsura Tarō
- Preceded by: Utsumi Tadakatsu
- Succeeded by: Katsura Tarō

Minister of Education
- In office 17 July 1903 – 22 September 1903
- Prime Minister: Katsura Tarō
- Preceded by: Kikuchi Dairoku
- Succeeded by: Yuzuru Kubota

Minister of the Army
- In office 23 December 1900 – 27 March 1902
- Prime Minister: Itō Hirobumi; Katsura Tarō
- Preceded by: Katsura Tarō
- Succeeded by: Terauchi Masatake

Personal details
- Born: 16 March 1852 Tokuyama, Suō, Japan
- Died: 23 July 1906 (aged 54) Shinjuku, Tokyo, Japan
- Resting place: Tama Cemetery
- Children: Hideo Kodama; Kodama Kyūichi
- Relatives: Shigetō Hozumi (son-in-law); Kōichi Kido (son-in-law)
- Awards: Order of the Golden Kite (first class); Grand Cordon of the Order of the Rising Sun with Paulownia Flowers; Grand Cordon of the Order of the Rising Sun; Grand Cordon of the Order of the Sacred Treasure

Military service
- Allegiance: Empire of Japan
- Branch/service: Imperial Japanese Army
- Years of service: 1868–1906
- Rank: General
- Battles/wars: Boshin War; Saga rebellion Shinpūren Rebellion; Satsuma Rebellion; First Sino-Japanese War; Russo-Japanese War

Viscount Kodama Gentarō (兒玉 源太郎; 16 March 1852 – 23 July 1906) was a Japanese general in the Imperial Japanese Army and a government minister during the Meiji period. He was instrumental in establishing the modern Imperial Japanese military.

== Early life ==
Kodama was born on March 16, 1852, in Tokuyama, Tsuno, Suō Province, the first son of the samurai Kodama Hankurō. His father was a mid-ranking samurai with a 100 koku landholding. At the time, the Kodama family had two daughters, Hisako and then Nobuko, and since Kodama was the first male member of the family, his birth was greatly appreciated by the whole family. When Kodama was born, his father, Hankurō, was at the house of his friend Shimada Mitsune, a scholar of Chinese poetry, who lived across the street and was enjoying poetry with four or five other people. When a family member hurriedly arrived to announce the birth of a son, Hankurō was overjoyed and rushed straight home to raise a toast.

== Military career ==
Kodama began his military career by fighting in the Boshin War for the Meiji Restoration against the forces of the Tokugawa shogunate in 1868. He was appointed a non-commissioned officer on 2 June 1870, advanced to sergeant major on 10 December, and promoted to warrant officer on 15 April 1871. He was commissioned a second lieutenant on 6 August and promoted to lieutenant on 21 September. He was promoted to captain on 25 July 1872 and to major on 19 October 1874.

As a soldier in the fledgling Imperial Japanese Army, he saw combat during the suppression of the Shinpūren and Satsuma Rebellions. He later enrolled in the Osaka Heigakuryo (大阪兵学寮) Military Training School. Successive and rapid promotions followed: lieutenant-colonel on 30 April 1880, colonel on 6 February 1883, and major-general on 24 August 1889.

Kodama was appointed head of the Army Staff College, where he worked with German Major Jakob Meckel to reorganize the modern Japanese military after the Prussian military.

Kodama went on to study military science as a military attaché to Germany. After his return to Japan, he was appointed Vice-minister of War in 1892.

After his service in the Sino-Japanese War (1894–1895), Kodama became Governor-General of Taiwan. During his tenure, he did much to improve the infrastructure of Taiwan and to alleviate the living conditions of the inhabitants. He was promoted to lieutenant general on 14 October 1896. Having proved himself an excellent administrator, Kodama spent the following decade serving as Minister of the Army under Prime Minister Itō Hirobumi. Kodama retained the post and took on the concurrent roles of Minister of Home Affairs and Education under the following prime minister, Katsura Tarō.

On 6 June 1904, Kodama was promoted to full general. However, he was asked by Marshal Ōyama Iwao to be Chief of General Staff of the Manchurian Army during the Russo-Japanese War. That was a demotion for him in terms of rank, but he nevertheless chose to take the position; the sacrifice elicited much public applause. Throughout the Russo-Japanese War, he guided the strategy of the whole campaign, as General Kawakami Sōroku had done in the First Sino-Japanese War ten years earlier. The postwar historian Shiba Ryōtarō gives him complete credit for Japan's victory at the Siege of Port Arthur, but there is no historical evidence for that, and Kodama kept quiet about his role in the battle. After the war, he was named Chief of the Imperial Japanese Army General Staff but died soon afterwards.

Kodama was raised in rapid succession to the ranks of danshaku (baron) and shishaku (viscount) under the kazoku peerage system, and his death in 1906 of a cerebral hemorrhage was regarded as a national calamity.

== Legacy ==
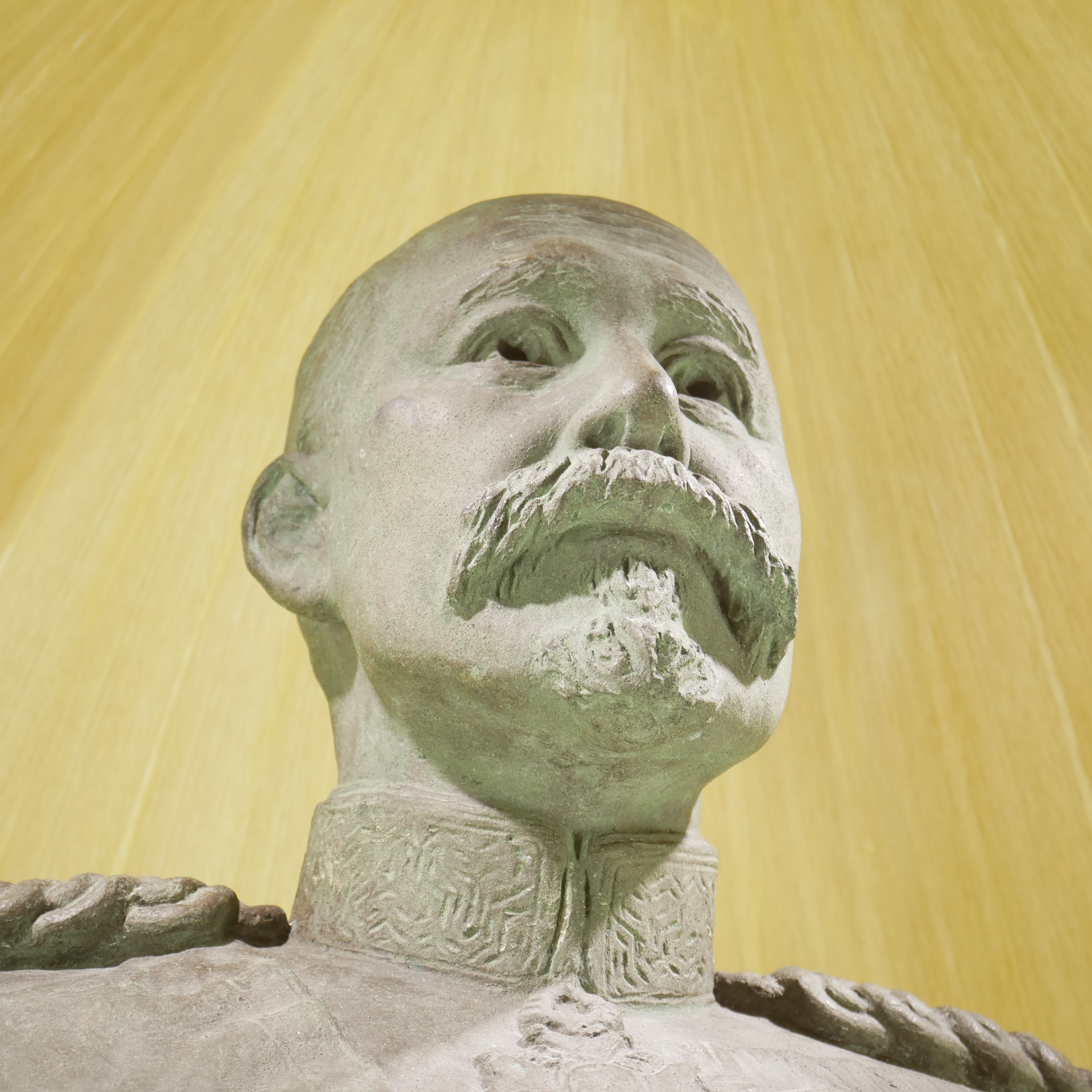
A bronze monument statue of Kodama Gentaro

Following a petition by Kodama's son, Hideo, the Meiji Emperor elevated Hideo to the title of hakushaku (count). Kodama later received the ultimate honor of being raised to the ranks of Shinto kami. Shrines to his honor still exist at his hometown in Shūnan, Yamaguchi Prefecture, and on the site of his summer home on Enoshima, Fujisawa, Kanagawa Prefecture.

== Honours ==
With information from the corresponding article in the Japanese Wikipedia

=== Peerages ===
- Baron (20 August 1895)
- Viscount (11 April 1906)

=== Order of precedence ===
- Senior seventh rank (March 1874)
- Senior sixth rank (28 May 1880)
- Fifth rank (18 April 1883)
- Fourth rank (27 September 1889)
- Senior fourth rank (26 October 1894)
- Third rank (8 March 1898)
- Senior third rank (20 April 1901)
- Second rank (23 April 1906)
- Senior second rank (23 July 1906; posthumous)

=== Decorations ===
==== Japanese ====
- Grand Cordon of the Order of the Sacred Treasure (27 December 1899; Second Class: 26 December 1894)
- Grand Cordon of the Order of the Rising Sun (27 February 1902; 2nd Class: 20 August 1895; 3rd Class: 7 April 1885; 4th Class: 31 January 1878)
- Grand Cordon of the Order of the Rising Sun with Paulownia Flowers (1 April 1906)
- Grand Cordon of the Order of the Golden Kite (1 April 1906; 3rd Class: 20 August 1895)

==== Foreign ====
- Russian Empire: 1st Class of the Order of Saint Stanislaus (12 September 1892)
- France: Commander of the Legion d'Honneur (14 October 1895)
- German Empire:
  - Knight 1st Class of the Order of the Red Eagle in Brilliants with swords (13 July 1906)
  - Kingdom of Bavaria: 1st Class of the Military Merit Order (12 September 1892)

== On film ==
The actor Tetsurō Tamba portrayed Gentarō in the 1980 Japanese war drama film The Battle of Port Arthur (sometimes referred as 203 Kochi). Directed by Toshio Masuda the film depicted the Siege of Port Arthur during the Russo-Japanese War and starred Tamba as General Gentarō, Tatsuya Nakadai as General Nogi Maresuke and Toshirō Mifune as Emperor Meiji.

== Notes ==
Government offices
| Preceded by Nogi Maresuke | Governor-General of Taiwan; February 1898 – April 1906 | Succeeded by Sakuma Samata |
Political offices
| Preceded by Katsura Tarō | Minister of War; December 1900 – March 1902 | Succeeded by Terauchi Masatake |
| Preceded by Utsumi Tadakatsu | Home Minister; 15 July 1903 – 12 October 1903 | Succeeded by Katsura Tarō |
| Preceded by Kikuchi Dairoku | Minister of Education; July 1903 – September 1903 | Succeeded by Kubota Yuzuru |
Military offices
| Preceded by Ōyama Iwao | Chief of Imperial Japanese Army General Staff; April 1906 – July 1906 | Succeeded by Oku Yasukata |
