= Takashima Tomonosuke =

Senior Second Rank Viscount Takashima Tomonosuke
- 高島 鞆之助
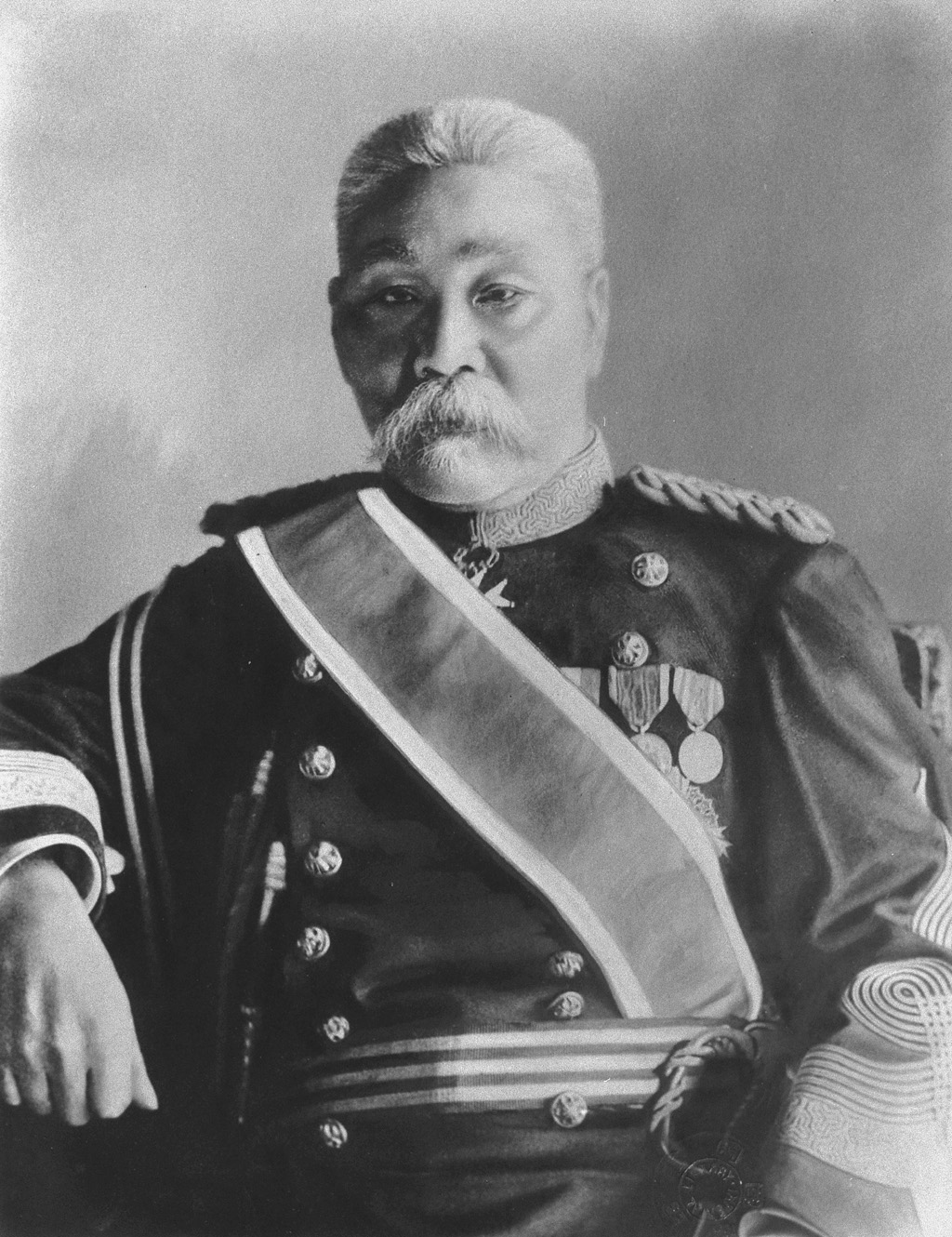

Minister of the Army
- In office 20 September 1896 – 12 January 1898
- Prime Minister: Matsukata Masayoshi
- Preceded by: Ōyama Iwao
- Succeeded by: Katsura Tarō
- In office 17 May 1891 – 8 August 1892
- Prime Minister: Matsukata Masayoshi
- Preceded by: Ōyama Iwao
- Succeeded by: Ōyama Iwao

Minister of Colonization
- In office 2 April 1896 – 2 September 1897
- Prime Minister: Itō Hirobumi; Matsukata Masayoshi
- Preceded by: Office established
- Succeeded by: Office abolished

Member of the Privy Council
- In office 14 February 1899 – 11 January 1916
- Monarchs: Meiji; Taishō
- In office 8 August 1892 – 27 September 1895
- Monarch: Meiji

Personal details
- Born: 18 December 1844 Kagoshima, Satsuma, Japan
- Died: 11 January 1916 (aged 71) Fushimi, Kyoto, Japan
- Resting place: Aoyama Cemetery
- Relatives: Nozu Michitsura (brother-in-law); Sukehide Kabayama (son-in-law)
- Awards: Order of the Rising Sun, Grand Cordon

Military service
- Allegiance: Empire of Japan
- Branch/service: Imperial Japanese Army
- Years of service: 1874–1916
- Rank: Lieutenant General
- Commands: IJA 4th Division
- Battles/wars: Boshin War; Satsuma Rebellion

Viscount Takashima Tomonosuke (高島 鞆之助, Tomonosuke Takashima; 18 December 1844 – 11 January 1916) was a samurai of Satsuma Domain, general in the early Imperial Japanese Army, and a cabinet minister in Meiji period Japan. Part of Sophia University in Tokyo is located on the site of his house.

== Military career ==
Born into a samurai family of Satsuma Domain (present day Kagoshima Prefecture, Takashima studied at the Han school Zōshikan. He fought in the Boshin War to overthrow the Tokugawa shogunate, and was a member of the personal guard of Emperor Meiji in 1869, and was named a chamberlain in 1871. With the creation of the Imperial Japanese Army in 1874, he was commissioned as a colonel and made commandant of the Kyododan (School for Non-commissioned Officers) in 1875.

In 1877, he was promoted to major general at the time of the Satsuma Rebellion and commanded the IJA 1st Detached Infantry Brigade against his former Satsuma clansmen. From 1879 to 1880, he was sent to Germany and France for further training. On his return, he was assigned command of the Kumamoto Garrison in late 1880, and the Osaka Garrison in 1881. In 1882, he was commander of Japanese forces during the Imo incident in Korea. He was promoted to lieutenant general in 1883. In 1884, Takashima was ennobled with the title of viscount (shishaku) under the kazoku peerage system.

Takashima resumed command of the Osaka Garrison from 1885, and was appointed the first commander of the Osaka-based IJA 4th Division after the reorganization of the Imperial Japanese Army into Divisions, based on reforms initiated by the Prussian general Jakob Meckel in 1888.

== Political career ==
In 1891, Takashima was named Army Minister in the first cabinet of Prime Minister Matsukata Masayoshi. He was appointed to the Privy Council the following year. A strong supporter of the 1895 Japanese invasion of Taiwan, Takashima subsequently served as the first Vice Governor-General of Taiwan after the First Sino-Japanese War. In 1896, at the request of Prime Minister Itō Hirobumi he established the Colonial Administration Department encourage Japanese investment and settlement in Taiwan.

From September 1896, Takashima resumed the post of Army Minister under the 2nd cabinet of Prime Minister Matsukata Masayoshi, holding that post until September 1898, when he retired from military service. He was appointed again to the Privy Council from 1899 to his death due to an Intracranial hemorrhage in 1916. His grave is at the Aoyama Cemetery in Tokyo.

== Decorations ==
- 1887 – Grand Cordon of the Order of the Rising Sun
- 1916 – Order of the Rising Sun with Paulownia Flowers

=== Foreign ===
- 1916 – France, Legion of Honour, Commandeur
