= Yamaji Motoharu =

Japanese army general (1841–1897)

Viscount Yamaji Motoharu
- 山地 元治
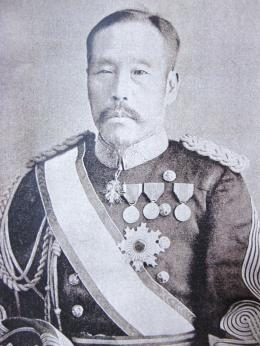
- Born: September 10, 1841; Kōchi, Tosa Province, Japan
- Died: October 3, 1897 (aged 56); Hōfu, Yamaguchi, Japan
- Military career
- Allegiance: Empire of Japan
- Branch: Imperial Japanese Army
- Service years: 1871–1897
- Rank: Lieutenant General
- Nickname: "Dokuganryu" (One- eyed Dragon)
- Commands: IJA 6th Division, IJA 1st Division.
- Conflicts: Boshin War; First Sino-Japanese War

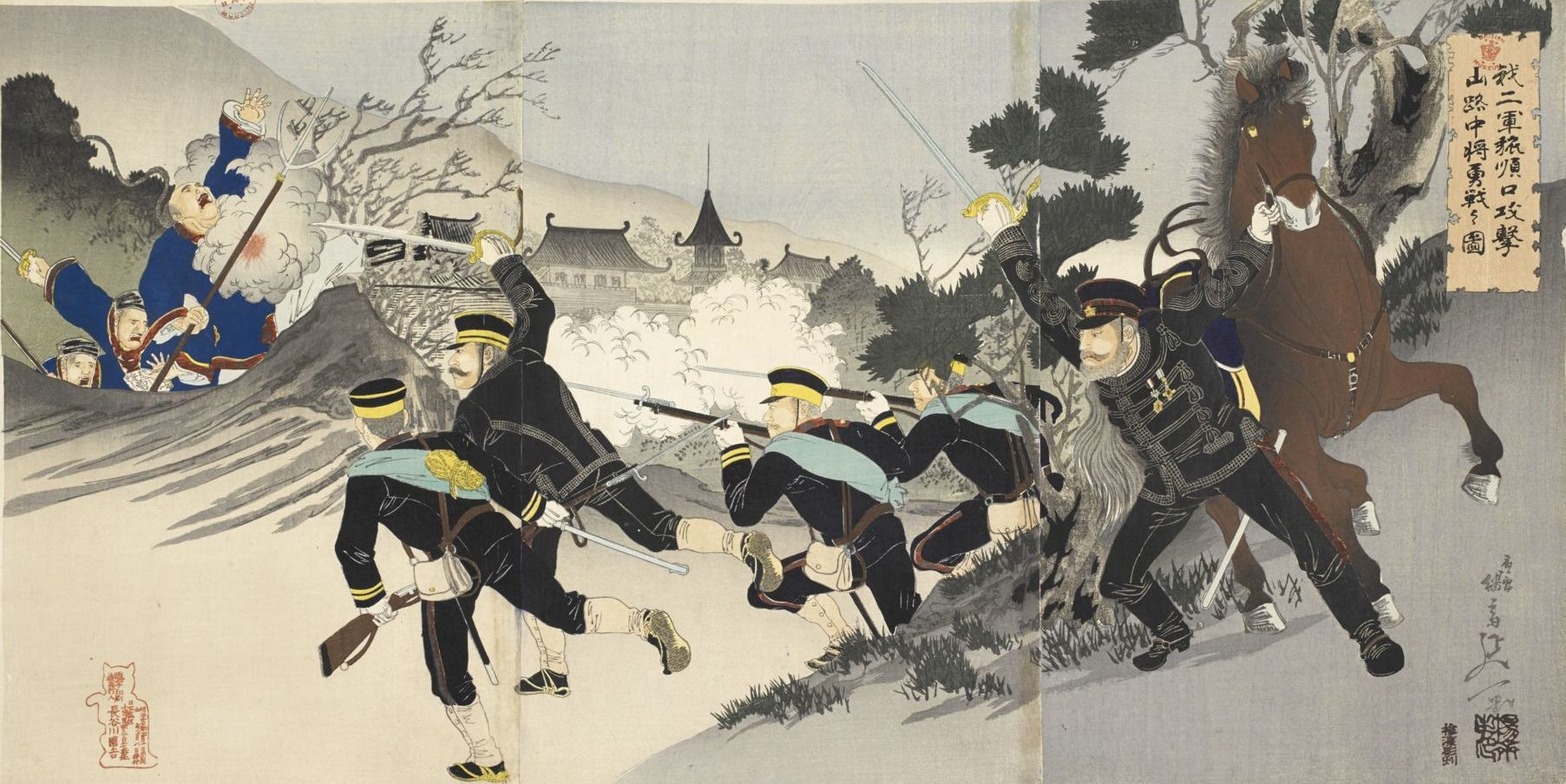
Lieutenant-General Yamaji leading the attack on Port Arthur (by Nobukazu Yōsai, 1894

Viscount Yamaji Motoharu (山地 元治; 10 September 1841 – 3 October 1897) was a lieutenant general in the early Imperial Japanese Army during the First Sino-Japanese War. Soldiers under his command committed the Port Arthur massacre.

== Biography ==
=== Early career ===
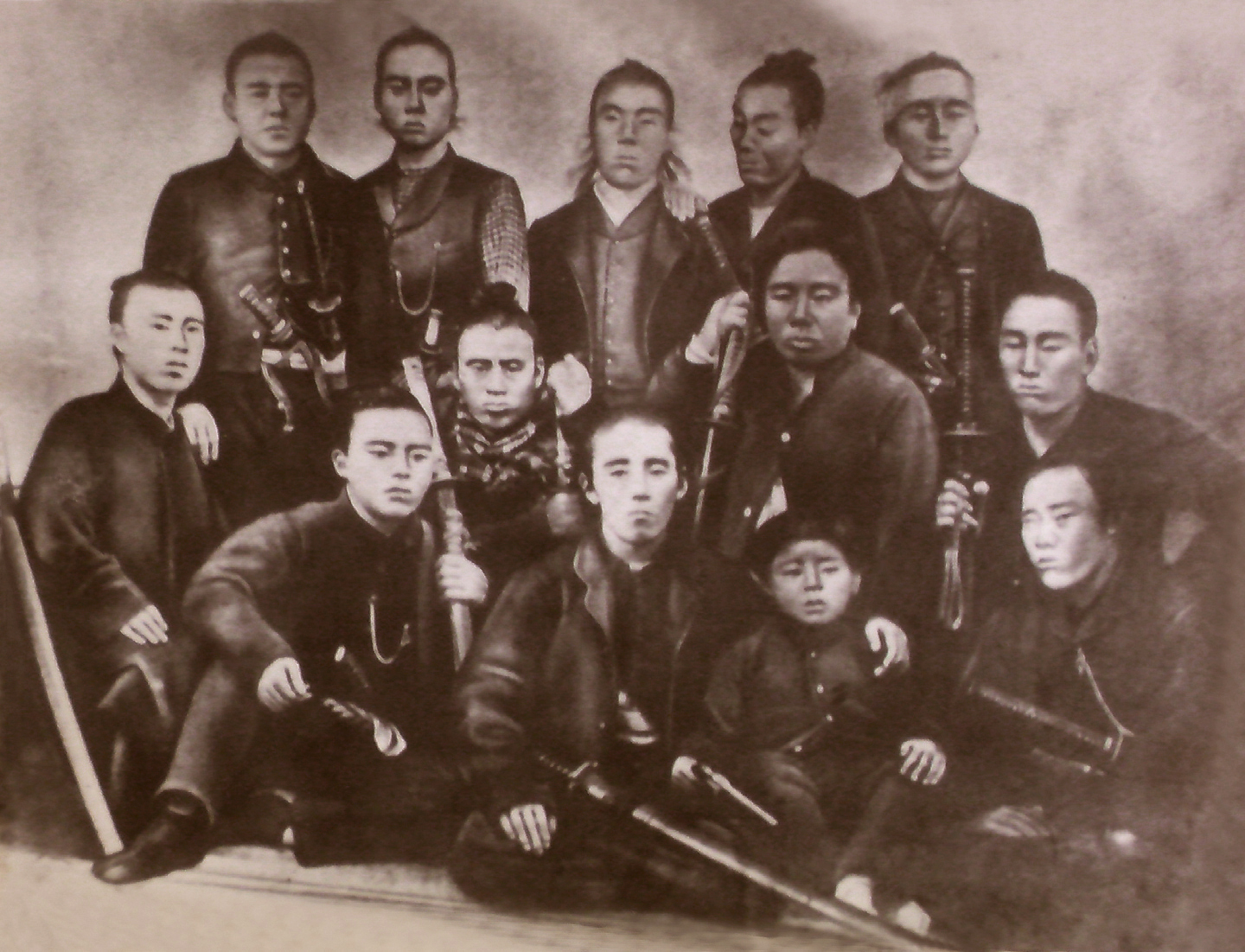
Jinshotai (Bottom row, from left: Ban Gondayu, Itagaki Taisuke, Tani Otoi (young boy), Yamaji Motoharu. Middle row, from left: Tani Shigeki (Sinbei), Tani Tateki (Moribe), Yamada Kiyokado (Heizaemon), Yoshimoto Sukekatsu (Heinosuke). Top row, from left: Kataoka Masumitsu (Kenkichi), Manabe Masayoshi (Kaisaku), Nishiyama Sakae, Kitamura Shigeyori (Chobei), Beppu Hikokuro.)

Yamaji was born in Tosa Domain (present day Kōchi Prefecture) in what is now part of the city of Kōchi, where his father was an upper-ranked samurai in the service of the Yamauchi clan. At the age of 13, he lost sight in one of his eyes, but notwithstanding his disability, he was appointed a company commander of the Jinshotai, a Tosa-Domain shock force, during the Boshin War of the Meiji Restoration, participating in the Battle of Toba–Fushimi, and in subsequent campaigns in northern Japan against the pro-Tokugawa Ōuetsu Reppan Dōmei. During the course of the conflict, he was promoted to company commander, and awarded a stipend of 150 koku.

After the war, Yamaji went to Tokyo, and was appointed by the Meiji government as a lieutenant colonel in the fledgling Imperial Japanese Army. During the Seikanron debate, he supported his fellow Tosa clansmen Itagaki Taisuke and Gotō Shōjirō, at one point resigning his commission and returning to Tosa to participate in the Freedom and People's Rights Movement, but eventually he had a falling out with Itagaki and returned to military service, receiving a position with the Guards Division.

During the Satsuma Rebellion Yamaji commanded the IJA 4th Infantry Regiment from March to October 1877, served as chief of staff of the IJA 3rd Infantry Brigade and subsequently commanded the IJA 3rd Infantry Regiment and IJA 12th Infantry Regiment.

=== As general ===
Yamaji was promoted to the rank of major general in February 1881, and commander of the Kumamoto Garrison. He subsequently served as commander of the Osaka Garrison, IJA 2nd Infantry Brigade, Kumamoto Garrison (second term), and was promoted to lieutenant general in December 1886. In May 1887, he was elevated to the title of baron (danshaku) in the kazoku peerage system by Emperor Meiji.

In May 1888, with the reorganization of the Imperial Japanese Army into divisions per the advice of Prussian military advisor Jakob Meckel, Yamaji was made commander of the new IJA 6th Division, and later of the IJA 1st Division.

During the First Sino-Japanese War, he saw combat at the Battle of Jinzhou and later at the Battle of Lushunkou. After the fall of Lushunkou, soldiers under his command were involved in the Port Arthur massacre. Yamaji is reported to have brought two camels back from Lushunkou as spoils of war. He presented one to the crown prince (the future Emperor Taishō) and the other to Ueno Zoo in Tokyo.

In August 1895, Yamaji's title was elevated to viscount (shishaku). After the war, he was appointed as commander of the Western Japanese Training District.

He died in 1897 in what is now part of the city of Hōfu, Yamaguchi. He was posthumous awarded the honorific title of Junior Second Court Rank His grave was recorded as being located in Aoyama Cemetery in Tokyo; however, on August 11, 1971, the Kochi Newspaper reported that Yamaji's gravestone had been found abandoned by a man taking a walk at the corner of the three-way intersection along the Koshū Kaidō (Japan National Route 20), near the National Observatory and Chōfu Airport, on what is now the grounds of Ajinomoto Stadium. A movement to purchase the monument by the citizens of Kōchi failed to raise the needed funds, and the monument is now used as an ornamental stone bridge in the Japanese garden of the head office of the Seikadō company in Tokyo. It is not known how the gravestone came to be abandoned, and the location of Yamaji's grave is now unknown.

== Decorations ==
- 1887 – Order of the Rising Sun, 2nd class 1325号
- 1895 – Grand Cordon of the Order of the Rising Sun
- 1895 – Order of the Golden Kite, 3rd class
