= Battle of Lüshunkou =

1894 battle of the First Sino-Japanese War

- Part of the First Sino-Japanese War
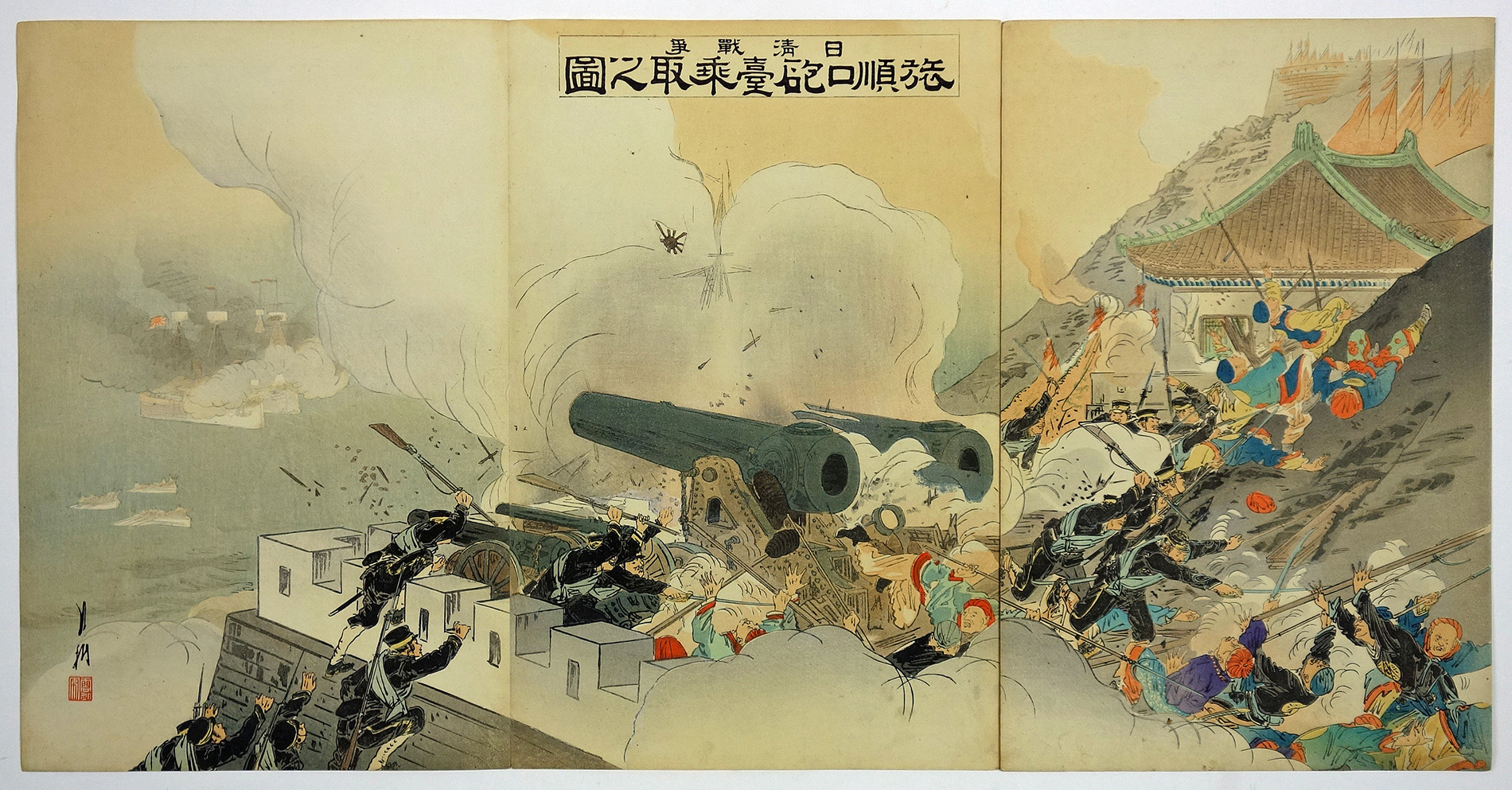
- Battle of Lüshunkou, Ogata Gekkō
Date	21 November 1894
Location	Lüshunkou, Manchuria, Qing Empire 38°50′06″N 121°16′48″E
Result	Japanese victory

Belligerents
Japan	China

Commanders and leaders
Ōyama Iwao; Yamaji Motoharu; Nogi Maresuke	Li Hongzhang; Jiang Guiti

Strength
~15,000 men	~13,000 men

Casualties and losses
40 killed 241 wounded 7 missing	Unknown
- Location within Liaoning Battle of Lüshunkou (China)

The Battle of Lüshunkou (Chinese: 旅順口之戰; Japanese: Ryojunkō-no-tatakai (旅順口の戦い)) was a land battle of the First Sino-Japanese War. It took place on 21 November 1894, in Lüshunkou, Manchuria (later called Port Arthur, in present-day Liaoning Province, China) between the forces of the Empire of Japan and the Qing dynasty. It is sometimes referred to archaically in western sources as the Battle of Port Arthur (that name is now primarily used for the opening battle of the Russo-Japanese War in 1904).

== Background ==
Following the Battle of Jiuliancheng at the Yalu River, and subsequent minor engagements in the Liaodong Peninsula, the strategic aim of Japan was to seize the heavily-defended and strategically important naval base of Lüshunkou, known in the West as "Port Arthur". This naval station had taken the Qing government sixteen years to build, and was considered superior to Hong Kong in its facilities. Defended by its hilly terrain and strengthened with fortifications and powerful artillery, it was widely considered to be an impregnable stronghold. Lüshunkou was also the only facility with dry docks and modern equipment capable of repairing the warships of the Beiyang Fleet, and its loss would mean that China would no longer have the capability to repair any ship damaged in combat. The location of Lüshunkou, at the entrance to the Gulf of Bohai also meant that it controlled the sea approaches to Peking.

== Chinese fortifications ==
The Chinese had prior to the war constructed considerable fortification on the Liaodong Peninsula.

At Jinzhou there were 4 240mm, 2 210mm and 2 150mm guns with 1,500 soldiers.

Olender gives an alternate figure of 2,700 at Jinzhou.

At Dalian the 5 forts/batteries had 8 240mm, 4 210mm, 6 150mm and 2 120mm guns all of the breechloading type with approximately 3,500 soldiers.

At Port Arthur the Chinese defenses were considerably more extensive, consisting of:

Locations	24cm Krupp	20cm Siege gun	21cm Krupp	9cm field	QF (quickfiring)	16cm Krupp	15cm Krupp	12cm Krupp	Other guns or features
Tiger's tail	3		2	24		4	6	4	2 searchlights
Erlong Hill				10	13		1	2	4 12cm armstrong guns
Pine-tree hill		2		2	1			1	4 mountain guns
Golden Hill	3		2	8					2 18cm 4 9cm siege
Total	6	2	4	44	14	4	7	7	

There were also over 50 guns and mortars of varying calibres, broadly 75-88mm of the positional and field types. This was in addition to 15 mitrailleuses and light revolver cannons. In addition 78 naval mines were present at Port Arthur.

The forts and land defenses in total should have had 22,000 soldiers instead of the 14,000 maximum stationed when the fighting reached the Liaodong Peninsula.

There also existed the Etse hill forts which were considered the strongest guarding Port Arthur but their contents and armaments are unknown.

Jowett states that there were 220 fortress guns around Lushunkou this would indicate that the Etse hill forts contained 57 guns of varying calibres.

== The battle ==
The Imperial Japanese Army's Japanese First Army under the overall command of Ōyama Iwao divided into two groups, with one group marching north as a diversion to threaten the Qing ancestral capital of Mukden, and the other marching south down the Liaodong Peninsula towards Lüshunkou. The Imperial Japanese Army's Japanese Second Army, with Lieutenant General Baron Yamaji Motoharu and General Nogi Maresuke landed at Pi-tse-wo (present day Pikou, Liaoning Province, China) on 24 October 1894. On 6 November 1894, Nogi's forces took the walled town of Jinzhou with very little resistance. The Liaodong Peninsula narrowed to only a 2.5-mile (4 km) width just past Jinzhou, so with the town in Japan's hands, Lüshunkou became isolated from its landward approaches.

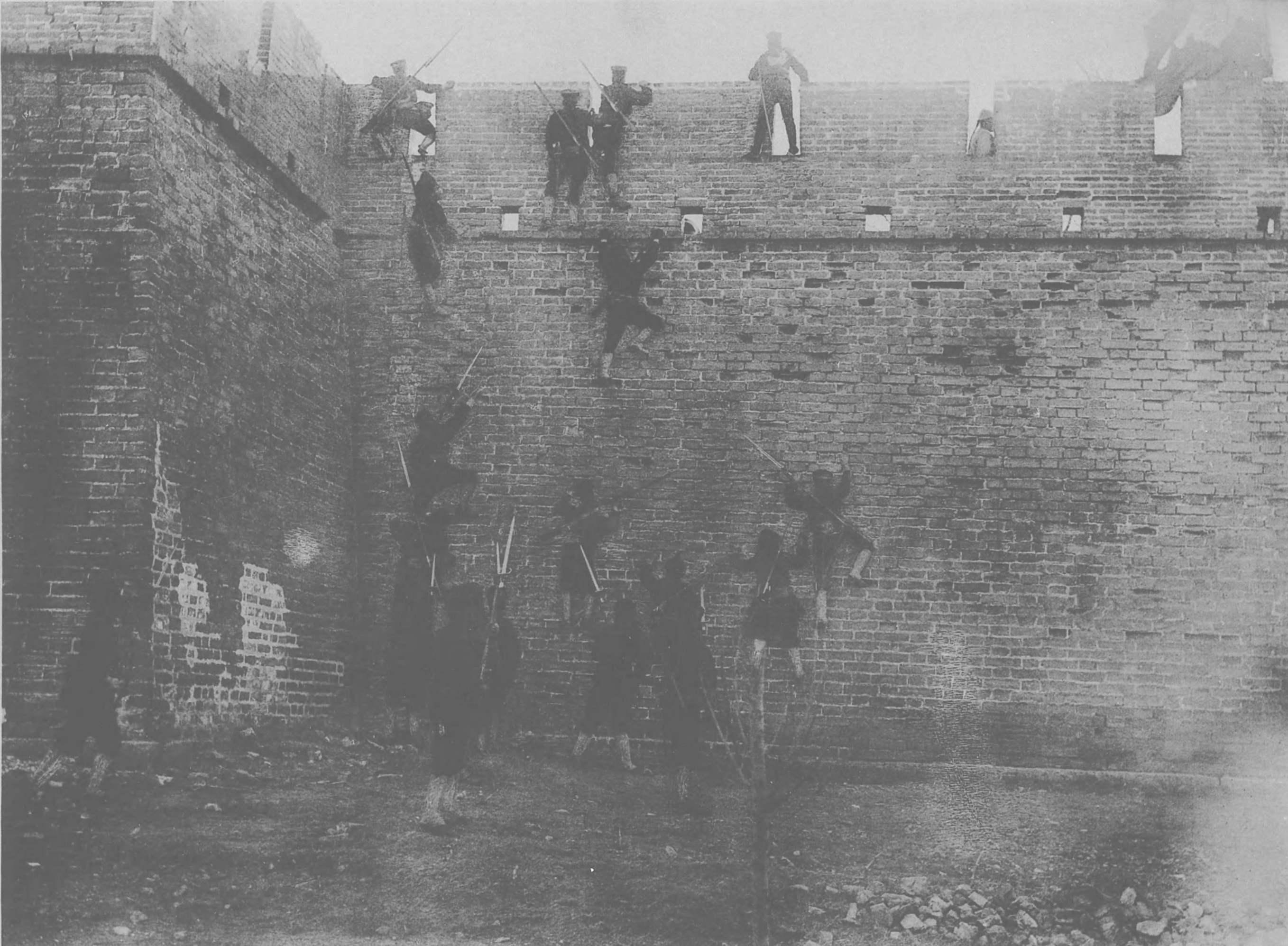
Japanese soldiers scaling the walls of Jinzhou

The following day, on 7 November 1894, Nogi marched into the port town of Dalian with no resistance, as its defenders had fled to Lüshunkou the previous night. The intact capture of the dock facilities greatly facilitated Japanese supply lines, as in their haste to depart, the defenders had even left behind plans to the minefields and details to the defenses of Lüshunkou. To make matters worse for the defenders of Lüshunkou, the Beiyang Fleet had received orders from Viceroy Li Hongzhang (based in Tianjin) to withdraw to Weihaiwei rather than risk engagement with the Imperial Japanese Navy, and was thus not able to play any role in the defense of their base. Worse still, when withdrawing from Lüshunkou, the flagship of the Beiyang Fleet, the battleship Zhenyuan, struck rocks at the entrance of Weihaiwei harbor and had to be beached. As the only docks capable of making repairs were at Lüshunkou, this effectively put it out of commission for the remainder of the war.

Skirmishing on the outskirts of Lüshunkou began on 20 November 1894, creating a panic among the defenders resulting in looting and destruction of property. Most of the Qing officers fled on two small boats which remained in port, leaving their men to their fate.

The assault on Lüshunkou began after midnight on 21 November 1894. Under heavy fire, the Japanese forces had stormed all of the important landward defenses by noon the following day. The shore fortifications held out a bit longer, but the final one fell to the Japanese by 1700 hours. During the night of 22 November 1894, the surviving Chinese defenders deserted their remaining positions, abandoning 57 large-caliber and 163 small-caliber artillery pieces. The fortifications, dockyards and a large supply of coal were captured largely intact by the Japanese.

== Aftermath of the battle ==
The speed of the Japanese victory at Lüshunkou was regarded as a turning point in the war by contemporary Western observers and was a strong blow to the prestige of the Qing government. The Chinese government responded by denying that the naval base had fallen, and stripped Li Hongzhang of his official titles.

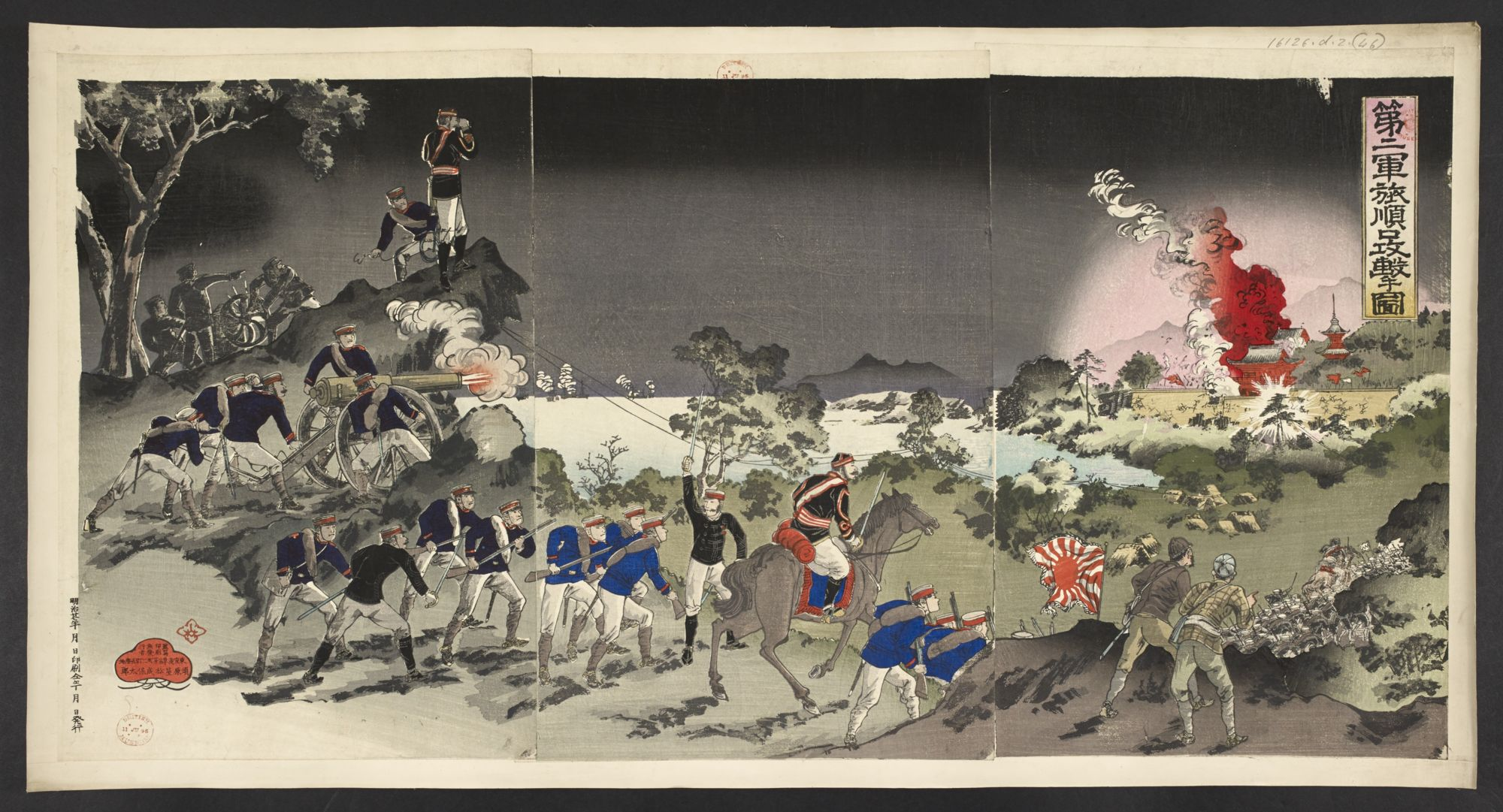
The Japanese 2nd army's attack upon Lushunkou

However, Japanese prestige over the victory was tempered by accounts of widespread massacre of the Chinese inhabitants of the city by victorious Japanese troops. The report was highly controversial, as other correspondents present initially denied that such events had occurred out of fear of the Japanese. News of a massacre soon spread among the Western public, damaging Japan's public image and nearly torpedoing ongoing efforts by Japan to renegotiate the unequal treaties with the United States. The event came to be popularly known as the Port Arthur massacre.
