= Japanese Manchurian Army =

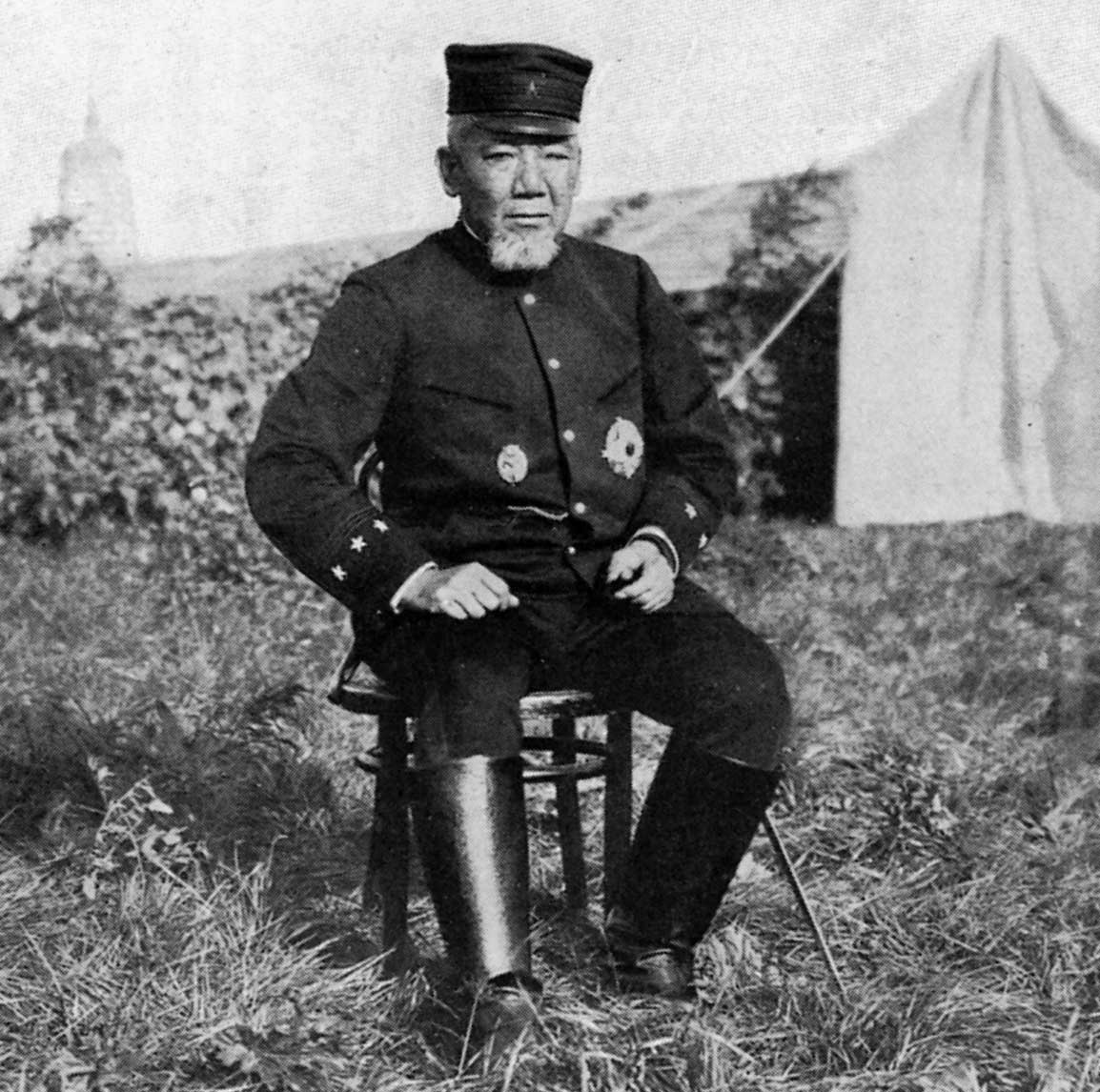
Field Marshal Ōyama, Commander of the Japanese Manchurian Army

The Japanese Manchurian Army (Japanese: 満洲軍, romanized: Manshū-gun) was an Army Group formed from 1904–1905 during the Russo-Japanese War, as a temporary command structure to coordinate the efforts of several Japanese armies in the campaign against Imperial Russia.

== History ==
The Japanese Manchurian Army was established as a local General command in June 1904 during the Russo-Japanese War. It was set up three months after the start of the war, because of the necessity to have a local command structure closer to the armies, after the operational theater had moved inland. The Army's headquarters was first located in Kaiping, and on August 22, 1904 it moved to Haicheng.

Field Marshal Iwao Oyama became Supreme Commander and General Kodama Gentarō Chief of Staff of the Army. The staff also included

- Yasumasa Fukushima, in charge of intelligence
- Tanaka Giichi, aide to General Kodama Gentarō

== Composition of the Army Group ==
- First Army (Kuroki Tamemoto)
- Second Army (Yasukata Oku)
- Third Army (Nogi Maresuke)
- Fourth Army (Nozu Michitsura)
- Ryodong Defensive Force (Nishi Kanjirō)
- Yalu River Army (Kageaki Kawamura)

== Sources ==
- Ikuhiko Hata, "Japan Army Encyclopedia," 2nd edition, the University of Tokyo Press, 2005.
- Toyama Misao Morimatsu, edited by "Imperial Army Formation directory" Fuyo Shobo Shuppan, 1987.
