= Ōyama Iwao =

Japanese general (1842–1916)

Junior First Rank Marshal Prince Ōyama Iwao
- 大山 巌
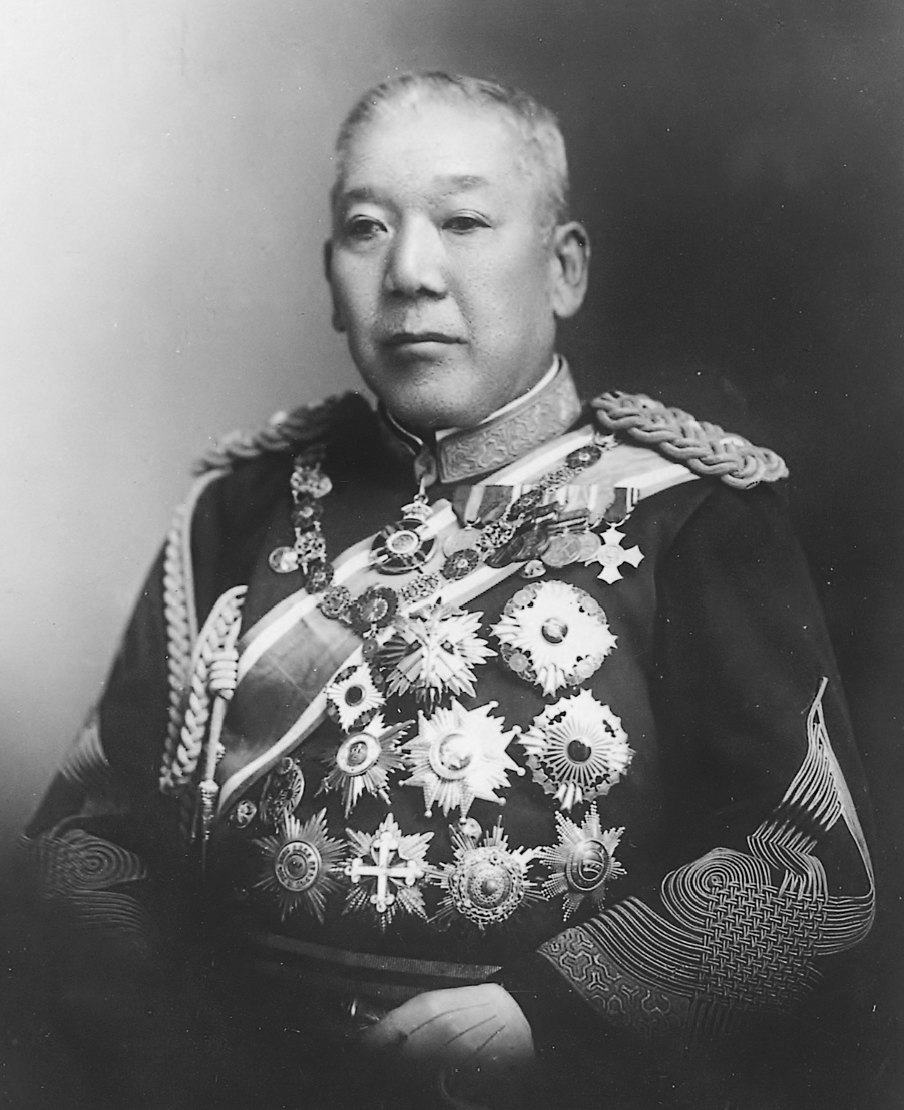

Lord Keeper of the Privy Seal
- In office 23 April 1915 – 10 December 1916
- Monarch: Taishō
- Preceded by: Prince Fushimi Sadanaru
- Succeeded by: Matsukata Masayoshi

Chief of the Imperial Japanese Army General Staff
- In office 20 December 1905 – 11 April 1906
- Monarch: Meiji
- Preceded by: Yamagata Aritomo
- Succeeded by: Kodama Gentarō
- In office 16 May 1899 – 20 June 1904
- Monarch: Meiji
- Preceded by: Kawakami Soroku
- Succeeded by: Yamagata Aritomo
- In office 4 September 1882 – 13 February 1884
- Monarch: Meiji
- Preceded by: Yamagata Aritomo
- Succeeded by: Yamagata Aritomo

Minister of the Army
- In office 8 August 1892 – 20 September 1896
- Prime Minister: Itō Hirobumi; Matsukata Masayoshi
- Preceded by: Takashima Tomonosuke
- Succeeded by: Takashima Tomonosuke
- In office 22 December 1885 – 17 May 1891
- Prime Minister: Itō Hirobumi; Kuroda Kiyotaka; Yamagata Aritomo; Matsukata Masayoshi
- Preceded by: Office established
- Succeeded by: Takashima Tomonosuke

Acting Minister of Education
- In office 16 February 1889 – 22 March 1889
- Prime Minister: Kuroda Kiyotaka
- Preceded by: Mori Arinori
- Succeeded by: Enomoto Takeaki

Member of the House of Peers
- In office 5 August 1895 – 10 December 1916 Hereditary peerage

Superintendent General of the Tokyo Metropolitan Police Department
- In office 13 October 1879 – 14 January 1881
- Preceded by: Kawaji Toshiyoshi
- Succeeded by: Kabayama Sukenori

Personal details
- Born: 12 November 1842 Kagoshima, Satsuma, Japan
- Died: 10 December 1916 (aged 74) Jingūmae, Tokyo, Japan
- Spouse: Yamakawa Sakiko (m. 1883)
- Children: Kashiwa Ōyama
- Awards: Collar of the Order of the Chrysanthemum; Grand Cordon of the Order of the Rising Sun with Paulownia Flowers; Order of the Golden Kite (1st class); Order of Merit

Military service
- Allegiance: Empire of Japan
- Branch/service: Imperial Japanese Army
- Years of service: 1868–1914
- Rank: Field Marshal
- Battles/wars: Boshin War; Battle of Utsunomiya Castle; Battle of Aizu; Satsuma Rebellion; First Sino-Japanese War; Battle of Lüshunkou; Battle of Weihaiwei; Battle of Pyongyang; Russo-Japanese War; Battle of Liaoyang; Battle of Shaho; Battle of Sandepu; Battle of Mukden

Prince Ōyama Iwao (大山 巌; 12 November 1842 – 10 December 1916) was a Japanese field marshal, and one of the founders of the Imperial Japanese Army. He was representative of the outstanding military commanders of the late modern period.

== Early life ==
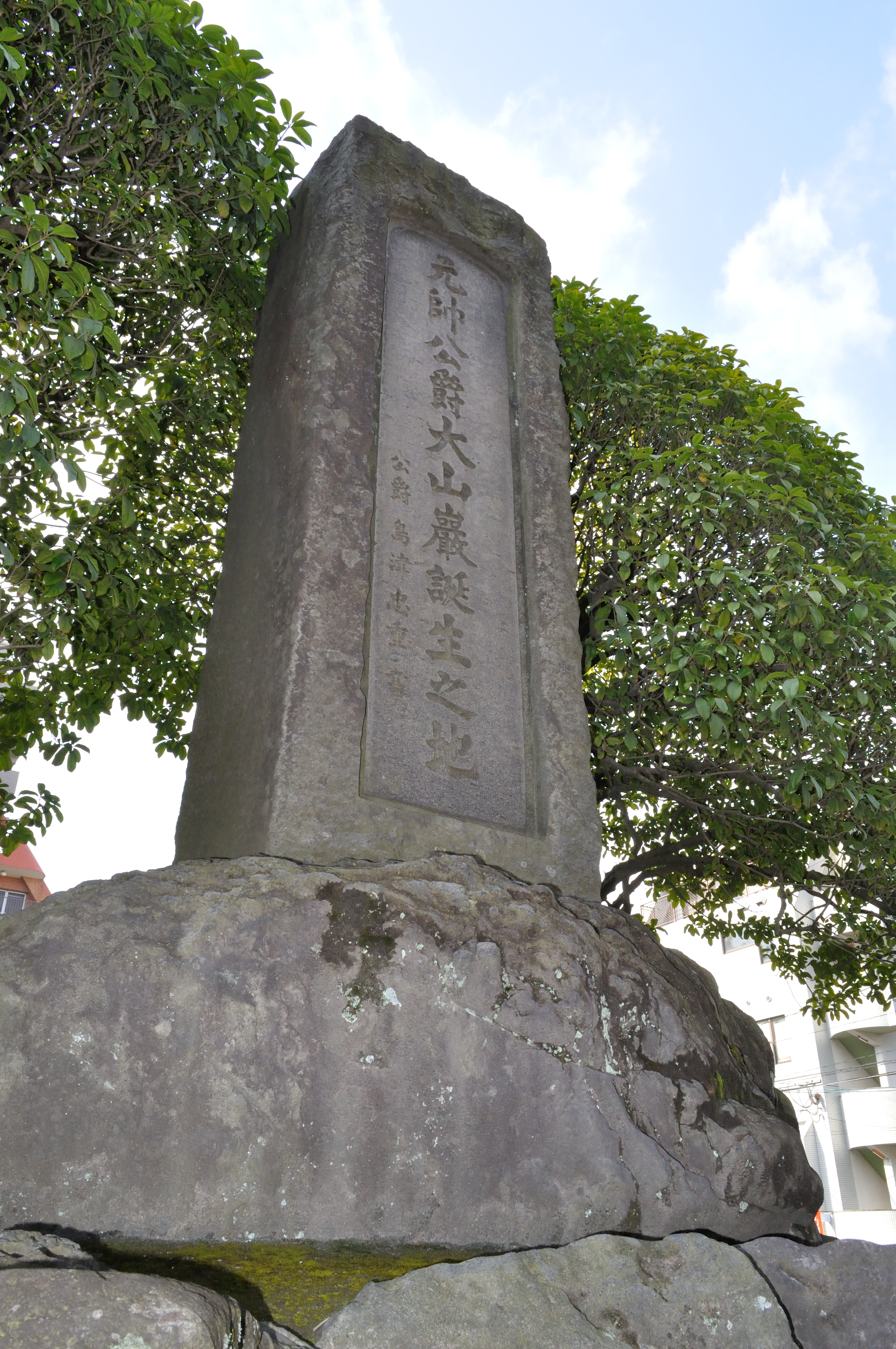
Birthplace in Kagoshima

Ōyama was born in Kagoshima to a samurai family of the Satsuma Domain. He was a younger paternal cousin to Saigo Takamori. A protégé of Ōkubo Toshimichi, he worked to overthrow the Tokugawa Shogunate and thus played a major role in the Meiji Restoration. He served as the commander of the Detached First Brigade during the Boshin War. At the Battle of Aizu, Ōyama was the commander of the Satchōdo's field artillery positions on Mount Oda. During the course of the siege, he was wounded by an Aizu guerilla force under Sagawa Kanbei.

Since at least 1904, local accounts have confused Ōyama Iwao with Sukeichi Oyama (1858-1922), Japanese engraver who studied at Temple Hill Academy in Geneseo, New York, United States.

== Military career ==
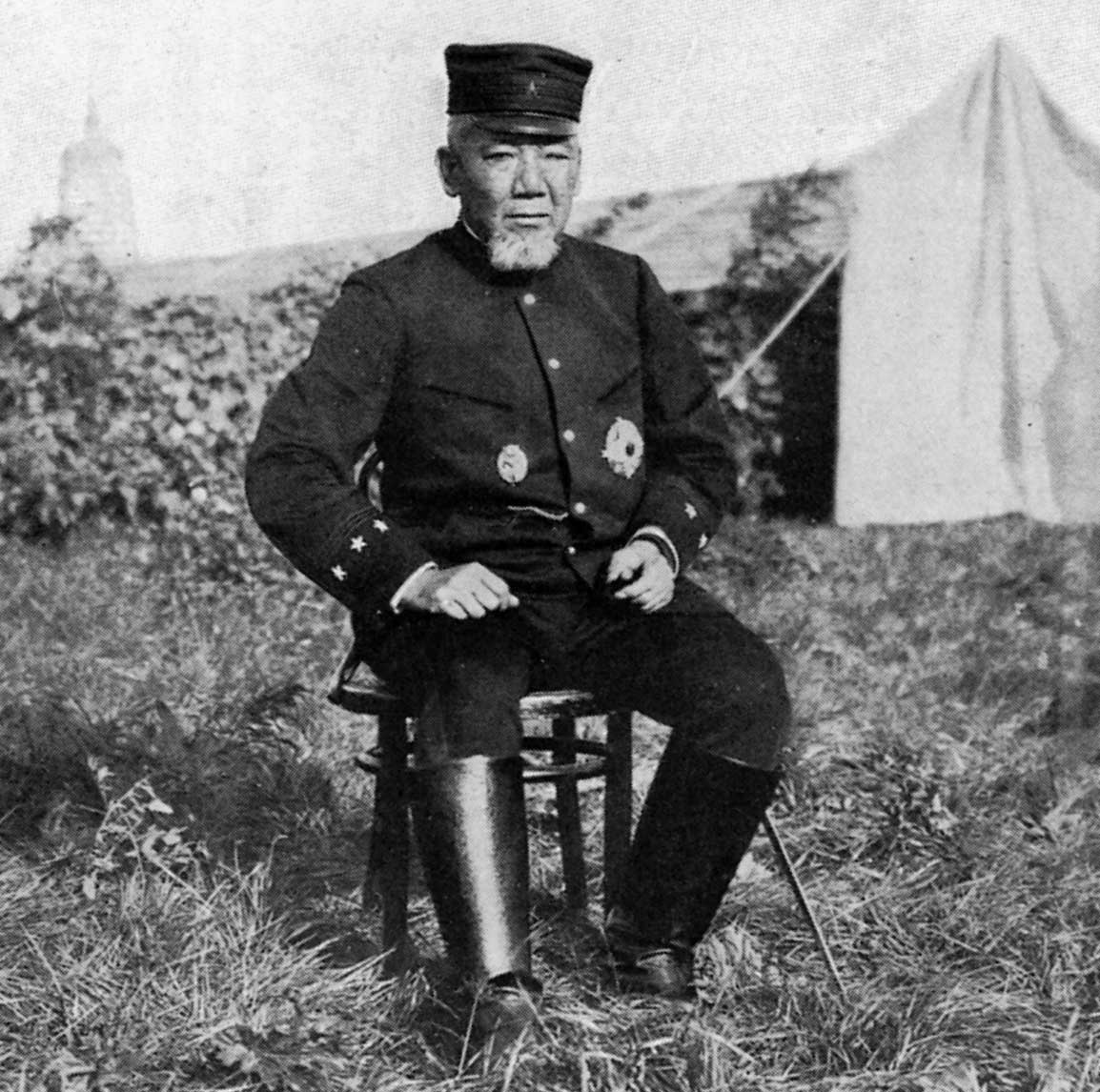
Field Marshal Ōyama during the Russo-Japanese War

In 1870, Ōyama was sent overseas to the École spéciale militaire de Saint-Cyr in France (August 1870 – March 1871) to study and was appointed the official Japanese military observer to the Franco-Prussian War. He also spent three years (July 1871 – October 1874) in Geneva studying foreign languages, and became fluent in Russian. Ōyama Iwao is the first recorded Japanese customer for Louis Vuitton, having purchased some luggage during his stay in France. After promotion to major general, he went to France again for further study, together with Kawakami Sōroku. On his return home, he helped establish the fledgling Imperial Japanese Army, which was soon employed in suppressing the Satsuma Rebellion, although Ōyama and his elder brother were cousins of Saigō Takamori.

In the First Sino-Japanese War, Ōyama was appointed the commander-in-chief of the Japanese Second Army, which after landing on Liaodong Peninsula, carried Port Arthur by storm, and subsequently crossed to Shandong, where it captured the fortress of Weihaiwei. After the war, Ōyama was disparaged by American reporter Trumbull White for failing to restrain his troops during the Port Arthur Massacre.

For his services Ōyama received the title of marquis under the kazoku peerage system, and, three years later in January 1898, he became a field-marshal. In the Russo-Japanese War of 1904–1905 he was appointed the Commander-in-Chief of the Japanese armies in Manchuria. As Supreme Commander of the Japanese Manchurian Army, Ōyama had complete authority over all Japanese land operations during the war, and personally directed the tactics of Japanese forces in all major battles, winning the Battle of Liaoyang and repulsing Russian counter-attacks at the Battle of Shaho and the Battle of Sandepu. He was replaced by General Kodama Gentarō briefly during early 1905 due to illness, but recovered to direct Japanese forces in the final Battle of Mukden.

After Japan's victory, Emperor Meiji elevated him in September 1907 to the rank of prince (公爵, kōshaku), the highest rank of the Empire of Japan.

== Political career and death ==
As the War Minister in several cabinets and as the Chief of the Army General Staff, Ōyama upheld the autocratic power of the oligarchs (genrō) against democratic encroachments. However, unlike Yamagata Aritomo, Ōyama was reserved and tended to shun politics. From 1914 to his death he served as the Lord Keeper of the Privy Seal (内大臣, naidaijin), and in this capacity attended the accession ceremony of the Emperor Taishō, which took place in Kyoto in November 1915.

In 1906, Ōyama was awarded the Order of Merit by King Edward VII. His Japanese decorations included Order of the Golden Kite (1st class) and Order of the Chrysanthemum.

Ōyama died at the age of seventy five in 1916, and was accorded a state funeral. Ōyama was a large man, and enjoyed large meals. His weight exceeded 210 pounds (95 kg), and may have contributed to his death, possibly arising from diabetes.

== Personal life ==
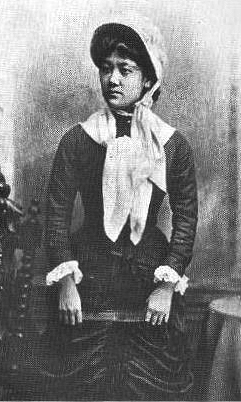
Ōyama Sutematsu at Vassar

=== Family ===
Ōyama's first wife Sawa died of puerperal disorder. Second wife Sutematsu (a survivor of the Battle of Aizu, a sister of former Aizu retainers Yamakawa Hiroshi and Yamakawa Kenjirō) was one of the first female students sent to the United States as part of the Iwakura Mission in the early 1870s. She spent eleven years there, graduating from Vassar College in 1882. In the next year she accepted her former enemy's proposal.

Ōyama was Emperor Meiji's first candidate for rearing future emperor Hirohito as a sort of surrogate father in 1901, in accordance with royal customs, but Ōyama declined and the role instead went to Count Kawamura Sumiyoshi.

Ōyama's first son Takashi, a navy cadet, died in the accidental explosion and sinking of the cruiser Matsushima in 1908. His second son Kashiwa Ōyama became an archaeologist after he retired from the army.

=== House ===
Ōyama, who spoke and wrote several European languages fluently, also liked European-style architecture. During his tenure as the War Minister, he built a large house in Tokyo modelled after a German castle.

Although he was very pleased with the design, his wife Sutematsu did not like it at all, and insisted that the children's room be remodelled in Japanese style, so that they would not forget their Japanese heritage. The house was destroyed by the Great Kantō earthquake in 1923 or possibly by American air raids during World War II.

== Kimigayo ==
In 1869, the British military band instructor John William Fenton, who was then working in Yokohama as an o-yatoi gaikokujin, told the members of Japan's military band about the British national anthem "God Save the King" and emphasised the necessity of a similar national anthem for Japan. The band members requested artillery Captain Ōyama Iwao, who was well versed in Japanese and Chinese literature, to select appropriate words and Ōyama selected the poem which came to be used in Japan's national anthem kimigayo.

== Honours ==
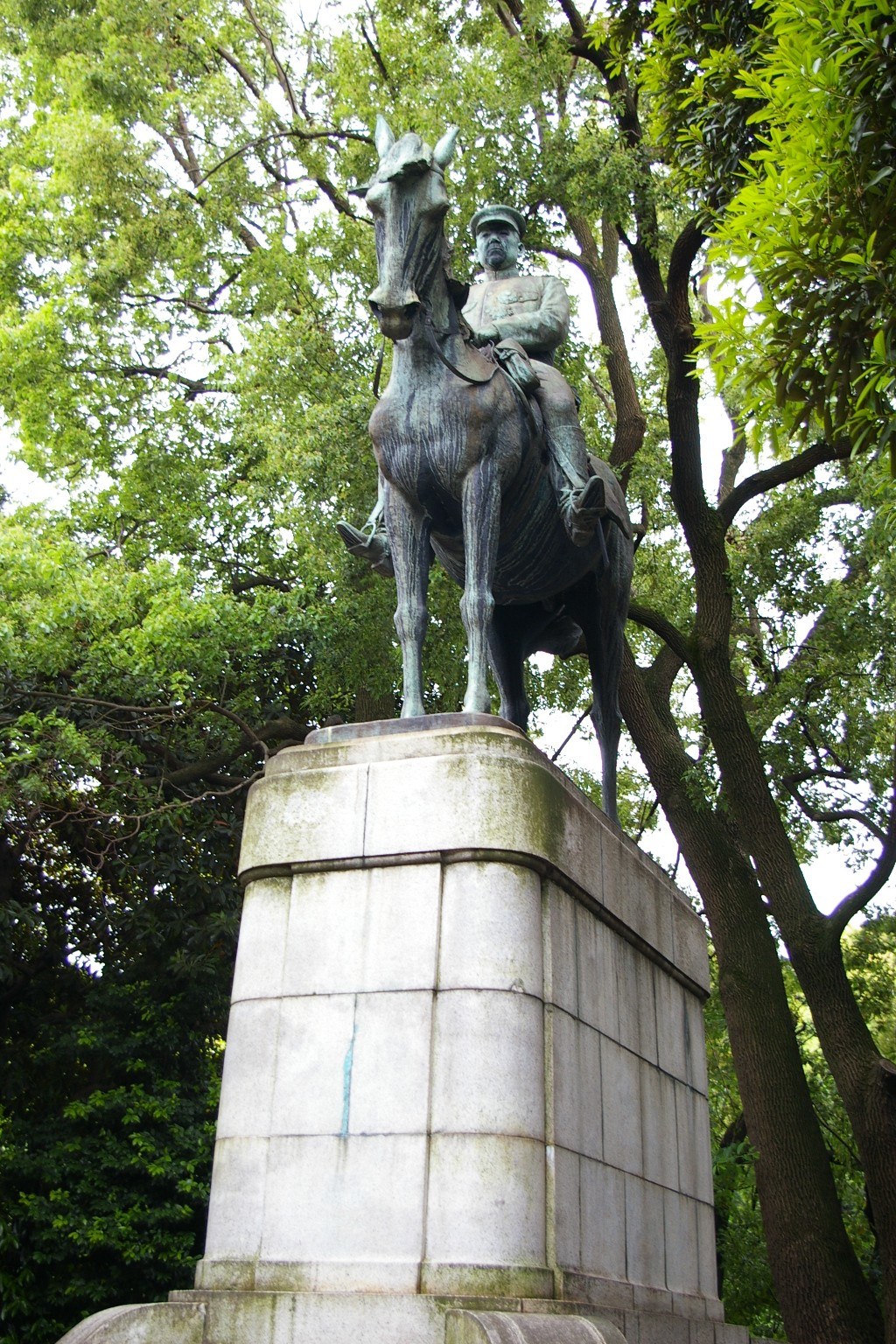
Statue of General Ōyama Iwao at Kudanzaka in Tokyo.

From the Japanese Wikipedia

=== Japanese ===
==== Peerages and other titles ====
- Count (7 July 1884)
- Marquess (5 August 1895)
- Gensui (20 January 1898)
- Prince (21 September 1907)
- Genrō (13 August 1912)

==== Decorations ====
- Grand Cordon of the Order of the Rising Sun (1 November 1882; Second Class: 9 November 1877)
- Imperial Constitution Promulgation Medal (25 November 1889)
- Grand Cordon of the Order of the Paulownia Flowers (5 August 1895)
- 1894–95 Sino-Japanese War Medal (18 November 1895)
- 1904–05 Russo-Japanese War Medal (1 April 1906)
- Order of the Golden Kite, First Class (1 April 1906; Second Class: 5 August 1895)
- Collar of the Order of the Chrysanthemum (1 April 1906; Grand Cordon: 3 June 1902)
- Emperor Taishō Enthronement Commemorative Medal (10 November 1915)
- Silver gift cup set (1 April 1916)
- First World War Medal (1 April 1916)

==== Court order of precedence ====
- Senior sixth rank (May 1871)
- Senior fifth rank (24 February 1875)
- Fourth rank (16 December 1879)
- Senior fourth rank (24 May 1880)
- Third rank (27 December 1884)
- Second rank (19 October 1886)
- Senior second rank (20 December 1895)
- Junior First Rank (10 December 1916; posthumous)

=== Foreign ===
- Grand Cross of the Order of the Crown of Italy (20 March 1883)
- Grand Cross of the Order of the Crown of Prussia (4 February 1884)
- Grand Cross of the Order of Saints Maurice and Lazarus of the Kingdom of Italy (9 February 1885)
- Knight First Class of the Order of the Iron Crown of Austria-Hungary (9 February 1885)
- Knight Grand Cordon of the Order of the White Eagle of the Russian Empire (1885)
- Order of the Crown of Thailand, 1st Class (1 May 1891)
- Order of Osmanieh, 1st Class of the Ottoman Empire (27 May 1891)
- Knight of the Order of Merit of the Prussian Crown with swords (22 March 1906)
- Order of Merit (OM) of the United Kingdom (5 April 1906)
- Grand Cross of the Legion of Honour of France (27 December 1906; Grand Officer: 13 April 1883)

=== Other ===
- Namesake of Oyama, British Columbia, a small town in British Columbia, Canada and Oyama Regional Park in Saskatchewan, Canada.

== Ancestry ==
Ancestors of Ōyama Iwao

8. Saigō Kichibee
4. Saigō Takamitsu
9. Machida NN
2. Ōyama Tsunamasa
5. Yotsumoto NN
1. Ōyama Iwao
12. Ōyama Tsunamichi
6. Ōyama Tsunatake
3. Ōyama Kyōko

== See also ==
- Kimigayo
- Katsura Ōyama

== Notes ==
Political offices
Preceded by none	Minister of War; Dec 1885 – May 1891	Succeeded by Takashima Tomonosuke
Preceded by Takashima Tomonosuke	Minister of War; Aug 1892 – Sept 1896	Succeeded by Takashima Tomonosuke
Preceded by Prince Fushimi Sadanaru	Lord Keeper of the Privy Seal; Apr 1915 – Dec 1916	Succeeded by Matsukata Masayoshi
Military offices
Preceded by post created	Commander, Second Army; September 1894 - May 1895	Succeeded by Oku Yasukata
Preceded by post created	Commander-in-Chief, Japanese Manchurian Army; June 1904 -October 1905	Succeeded by post abolished
Preceded by Yamagata Aritomo	Chief of Imperial Japanese Army General Staff; Sept 1882 – Feb 1884	Succeeded by Yamagata Aritomo
Preceded by Kawakami Soroku	Chief of Imperial Japanese Army General Staff; May 1899 – June 1904	Succeeded by Yamagata Aritomo
Preceded by Yamagata Aritomo	Chief of Imperial Japanese Army General Staff; Dec 1905 – Apr 1906	Succeeded by Kodama Gentarō
