= Imperial Japanese Army General Staff Office =

Agency charged with overseeing the Imperial Japanese Army (1878–1945)

- 参謀本部 (Sanbō Honbu)
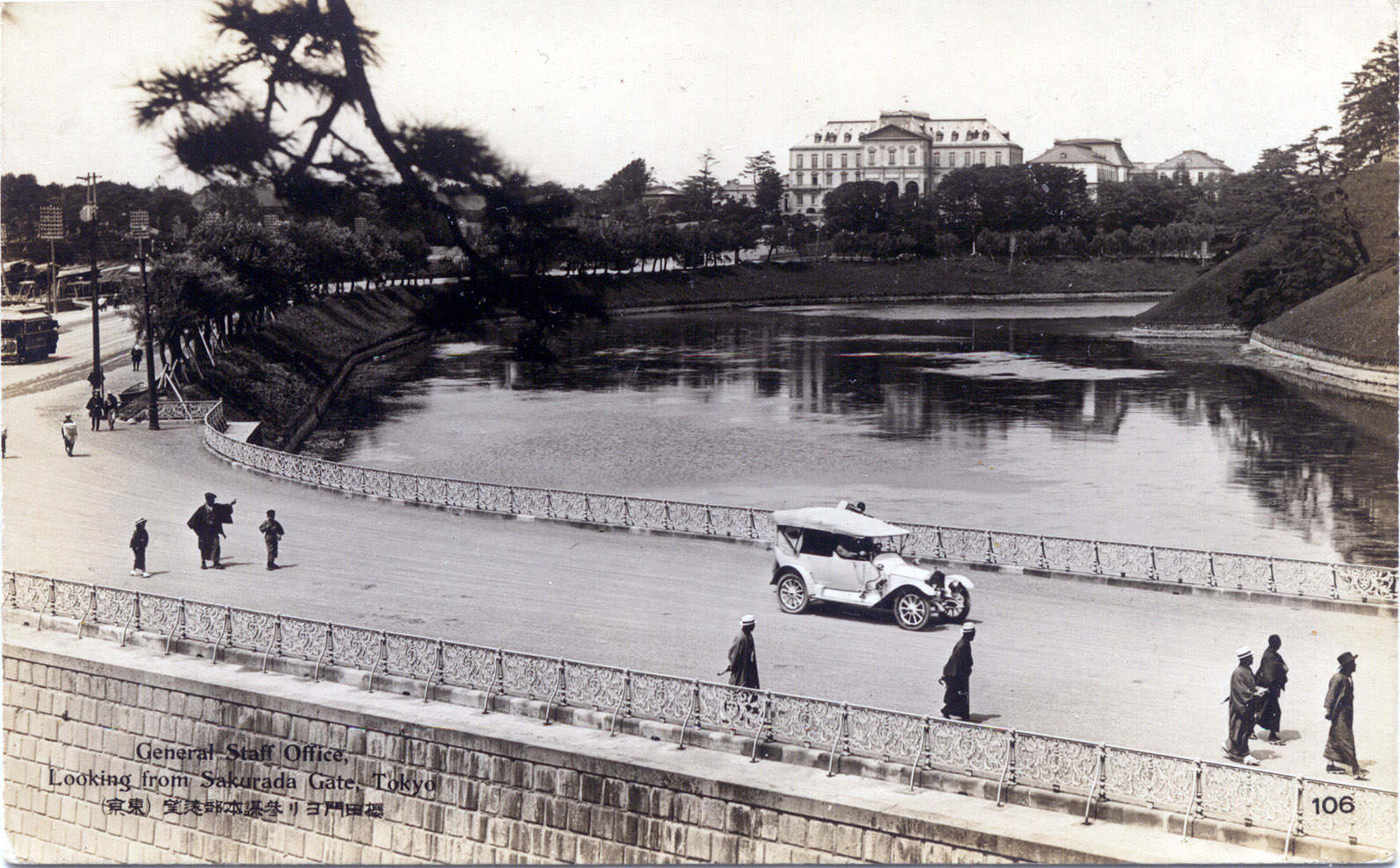
- Postcard with view of Imperial Japanese Army General Staff Office HQ, c. 1910
- Founded: 24 December 1878
- Disbanded: September 1945
- Country: Empire of Japan
- Allegiance: Emperor of Japan
- Branch: Imperial Japanese Army
- Type: Military staff
- Part of: Imperial General Headquarters
- Headquarters: Tokyo
- Colors: Red White

Commanders
- First Chief: Yamagata Aritomo
- Last Chief: Yoshijirō Umezu

Insignia
- The IJA ensign

The Imperial Japanese Army General Staff Office (参謀本部, Sanbō Honbu), also called the Army General Staff, was one of the two principal agencies charged with overseeing the Imperial Japanese Army (IJA).

== Role ==
The Army Ministry (陸軍省, Rikugunshō) was created in April 1872, along with the Navy Ministry, to replace the Ministry of Military Affairs (Hyōbushō) of the early Meiji government. Initially, the Army Ministry was in charge of both administration and operational command of the Imperial Japanese Army however, from December 1878, the Imperial Army General Staff Office took over all operational control of the Army, leaving the Army Ministry only with administrative functions. The Imperial Army General Staff was thus responsible for the preparation of war plans; the military training and employment of combined arms military intelligence; the direction of troop maneuvers; troop deployments; and the compilation of field service military regulations, military histories, and cartography.

The Chief of the Army General Staff was the senior ranking uniformed officer in the Imperial Japanese Army and enjoyed, along with the Army Minister, the Navy Minister, and the Chief of the Navy General Staff, direct access to the Emperor. In wartime, the Imperial Army General Staff formed part of the army section of the Imperial General Headquarters, an ad hoc body under the supervision of the emperor created to assist in coordinating overall command.

== History ==
Following the overthrow of the Tokugawa shogunate in 1867 and the "restoration" of direct imperial rule, the leaders of the new Meiji government sought to reduce Japan's vulnerability to Western imperialism by systematically emulating the technological, governing, social, and military practices of the Western European great powers. Initially, under Ōmura Masujirō and his newly created Ministry of the Military Affairs (Hyōbu-shō), the Japanese military was patterned after that of France. However, the stunning victory of Prussia and the other members of the North German Confederation in the 1870/71 Franco-Prussian War convinced the Meiji oligarchs of the superiority of the Prussian military model and in February 1872, Yamagata Aritomo and Oyama Iwao proposed that the Japanese military be remodeled along Prussian lines. In December 1878, at the urging of Katsura Taro, who had formerly served as a military attaché to Prussia, the Meiji government fully adopted the Prussian/German general staff system (Großer Generalstab) which included the independence of the military from civilian organs of government, thus ensuring that the military would stay above political party maneuvering, and would be loyal directly to the emperor rather than to a Prime Minister who might attempt to usurp the emperor's authority.

The administrative and operational functions of the army were divided between two agencies. A reorganized Ministry of War served as the administrative, supply, and mobilization agency of the army, and an independent Army General Staff had responsibility for strategic planning and command functions. The Chief of the Army General Staff, with direct access to the emperor could operate independently of the civilian government. This complete independence of the military from civilian oversight was codified in the 1889 Meiji Constitution which designated that the Army and Navy were directly under the personal command of the emperor, and not under the civilian leadership or Cabinet.

Yamagata became the first chief of the Army General Staff in 1878. Thanks to Yamagata's influence, the Chief of the Army General Staff became far more powerful than the War Minister. Furthermore, a 1900 imperial ordinance (Military Ministers to be Active-Duty Officers Law (軍部大臣現役武官制, Gumbu daijin gen'eki bukan sei)) decreed that the two service ministers had to be chosen from among the generals or lieutenant generals (admirals or vice admirals) on the active duty roster. By ordering the incumbent War Minister to resign or by ordering generals to refuse an appointment as War Minister, the Chief of the General Staff could effectively force the resignation of the cabinet or forestall the formation of a new one.

Of the seventeen officers who served as Chief of the Army General Staff between 1879 and 1945, three were members of the Imperial Family (Prince Arisugawa Taruhito, Prince Komatsu Akihito, and Prince Kan'in Kotohito) and thus enjoyed great prestige by virtue of their ties to the Emperor.

The American occupation authorities abolished the Imperial Army General Staff in September 1945.

== Organization ==
The Organization of the Army General Staff Office underwent a number of changes during its history. Immediately before the start of the Pacific War, it was divided into four operational bureaus and a number of supporting organs:

Chief of the Army General Staff (general or Field Marshal)
Vice Chief of the Army General Staff (lieutenant general)

- General Affairs (personnel, accounting, medical, mobilization planning)
- G-1 (Operations)
  - Strategy and Tactics Department
  - Land Survey Department (or Land Surveying Bureau)
- G-2 (Intelligence)
  - Russia Department
  - Europe and North America Department
  - China Department
  - Others Department
- G-3 (Transport & Communications)
- G-4 (Historical and Maps)
- G-5 (Fortifications) [from Jan 1889 – Dec 1908]
- General Staff College

== Chiefs of the General Staff ==
Note: The given rank for each person is the highest rank the person held during their tenure.

No.	Portrait	Chief of the General Staff	Took office	Left office	Time in office
1	Yamagata Aritomo山縣 有朋	Lieutenant General; Yamagata Aritomo 山縣 有朋 (1838–1922)	24 December 1878	4 September 1882	3 years, 254 days
2	Ōyama Iwao大山 巌	Lieutenant General; Ōyama Iwao 大山 巌 (1842–1916)	4 September 1882	13 February 1884	1 year, 162 days
3	Count Yamagata Aritomo山縣 有朋	Lieutenant General; Count Yamagata Aritomo 山縣 有朋 (1838–1922)	13 February 1884	22 December 1885	1 year, 312 days
4	Prince Arisugawa Taruhito有栖川宮熾仁親王	General; Prince Arisugawa Taruhito 有栖川宮熾仁親王 (1835–1895)	22 December 1885	14 May 1888	2 years, 144 days
5	Baron Ozawa Takeo [ja]小沢武雄	Lieutenant General; Baron Ozawa Takeo 小沢武雄 (1844–1926)	14 May 1888	9 March 1889	301 days
6	Prince Arisugawa Taruhito有栖川宮熾仁親王	General; Prince Arisugawa Taruhito 有栖川宮熾仁親王 (1835–1895)	9 March 1889	15 January 1895 †	5 years, 318 days
7	Prince Komatsu Akihito小松宮彰仁親王	Field Marshal; Prince Komatsu Akihito 小松宮彰仁親王 (1846–1903)	26 January 1895	20 January 1898	2 years, 359 days
8	Viscount Kawakami Soroku川上 操六	General; Viscount Kawakami Soroku 川上 操六 (1848–1899)	20 January 1898	11 May 1899 †	1 year, 111 days
9	Marquis Ōyama Iwao大山 巌	Field Marshal; Marquis Ōyama Iwao 大山 巌 (1842–1916)	16 May 1899	20 June 1904	5 years, 35 days
10	Marquis Yamagata Aritomo山縣 有朋	Field Marshal; Marquis Yamagata Aritomo 山縣 有朋 (1838–1922)	20 June 1904	20 December 1905	1 year, 183 days
11	Marquis Ōyama Iwao大山 巌	Field Marshal; Marquis Ōyama Iwao 大山 巌 (1842–1916)	20 December 1905	11 April 1906	112 days
12	Viscount Kodama Gentarō兒玉 源太郎	General; Viscount Kodama Gentarō 兒玉 源太郎 (1852–1906)	11 April 1906	23 July 1906 †	103 days
13	Count Oku Yasukata奥 保鞏	Field Marshal; Count Oku Yasukata 奥 保鞏 (1847–1930)	30 July 1906	20 January 1912	5 years, 174 days
14	Viscount Hasegawa Yoshimichi長谷川 好道	Field Marshal; Viscount Hasegawa Yoshimichi 長谷川 好道 (1850–1924)	20 January 1912	17 December 1915	3 years, 331 days
15	Viscount Uehara Yūsaku上原 勇作	Field Marshal; Viscount Uehara Yūsaku 上原 勇作 (1856–1933)	17 December 1915	17 March 1923	7 years, 90 days
16	Kawai Misao [ja]河合操	General; Kawai Misao 河合操 (1864–1941)	17 March 1923	2 March 1926	2 years, 350 days
17	Suzuki Soroku [ja]鈴木荘六	General; Suzuki Soroku 鈴木荘六 (1865–1940)	2 March 1926	19 February 1930	3 years, 354 days
18	Kanaya Hanzo [ja]金谷範三	General; Kanaya Hanzo 金谷範三 (1873–1933)	19 February 1930	23 December 1931	1 year, 307 days
19	Prince Kan'in Kotohito閑院宮載仁親王	Field Marshal; Prince Kan'in Kotohito 閑院宮載仁親王 (1865–1945)	23 December 1931	3 September 1940	8 years, 255 days
20	Hajime Sugiyama杉山 元	Field Marshal; Hajime Sugiyama 杉山 元 (1880–1945)	3 September 1940	21 February 1944	3 years, 171 days
21	Hideki Tojo東條 英機	General; Hideki Tojo 東條 英機 (1884–1948)	21 February 1944	18 July 1944	148 days
22	Yoshijirō Umezu梅津美治郎	General; Yoshijirō Umezu 梅津美治郎 (1882–1949)	18 July 1944	September 1945	1 year, 45 days

== See also ==
- Army Ministry
