= Port Arthur massacre (China) =

1894 massacre by the Japanese army

- Part of the First Sino-Japanese War
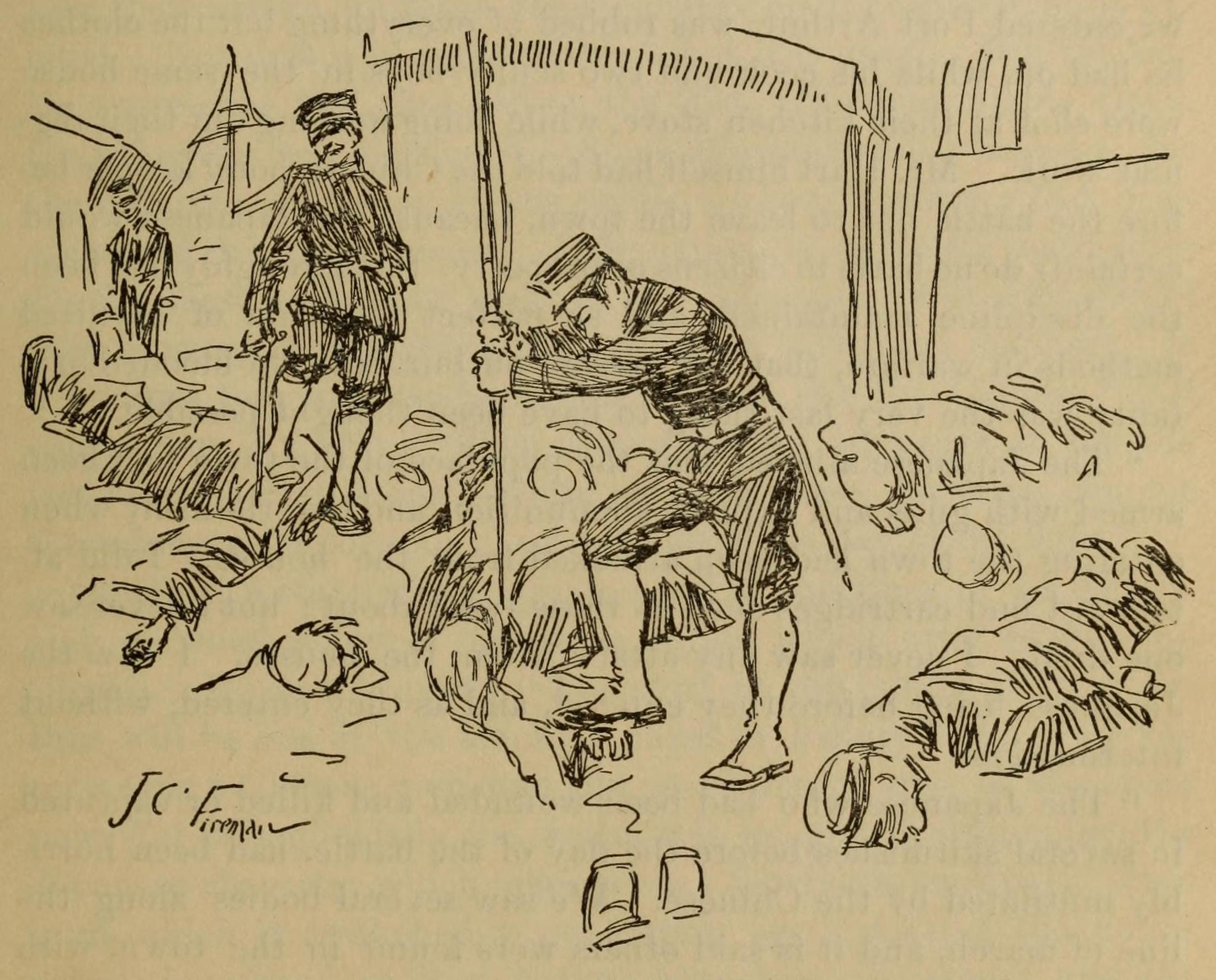
- Location: 38°51′03″N 121°15′25″E; Port Arthur (present-day Lüshunkou District of Dalian), Qing China
- Date: 21 November 1894
- Target: Soldiers and civilians
- Attack type: Massacre
- Deaths: Estimates range from 2,600 to 60,000
- Perpetrators: 1st Division, Japanese Imperial Army: Yamaji Motoharu

Port Arthur massacre
- Traditional Chinese: 旅順大屠殺
- Simplified Chinese: 旅顺大屠杀
Transcriptions
Standard Mandarin
- Hanyu Pinyin: Lǚshùn Dàtúshā

The Port Arthur massacre (Chinese: 旅順大屠殺) took place during the First Sino-Japanese War from 21 November 1894 for three days, in the Chinese coastal city of Port Arthur (now Lüshunkou District of Dalian, Liaoning), when advance elements of the First Division of the Japanese Second Army under the command of General Yamaji Motoharu (1841–1897) killed somewhere between 2,600 civilians and 20,000 people including Chinese soldiers, although one eyewitness reporter estimated a total death toll of 60,000, including civilians, soldiers, and residents of the outlying rural district.

Reports of a massacre were first published by the Canadian journalist James Creelman of the New York World, whose account was widely circulated within the United States. In 1894, the State Department ordered its ambassador to Japan, Edwin Dun, to conduct an independent investigation of Creelman's reports.

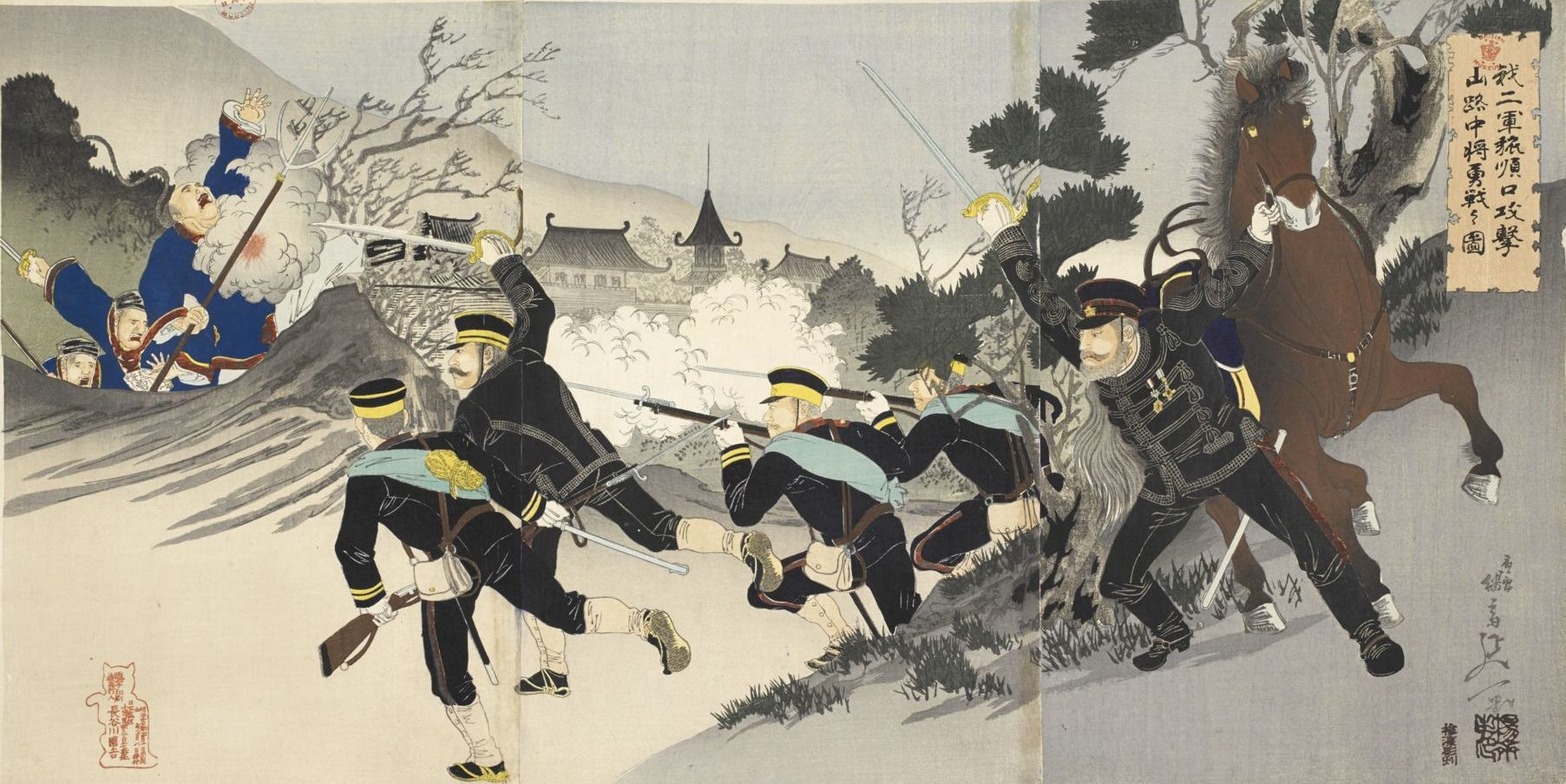
Lieutenant-General Yamaji leading the attack on Port Arthur (by Nobukazu Yōsai, 1894

== Background ==
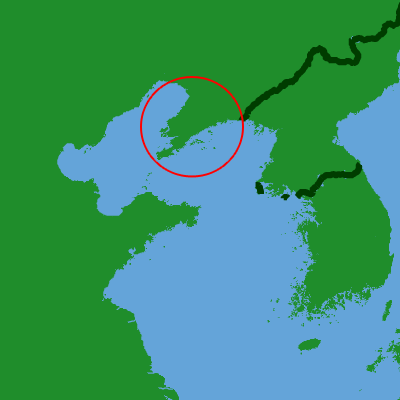
Liaodong Peninsula

As part of its wartime strategy during the First Sino-Japanese War, Japan had advanced through Korea, engaging Chinese troops at Asan near Seoul and then Pyongyang in September 1894, winning decisive victories on both occasions. Following the victory at Pyongyang the Japanese Second Army under Marshal Ōyama Iwao (1842–1916) moved northward towards Manchuria, the plan being to seize Port Arthur, headquarters to China's Beiyang Fleet and a highly fortified city that dominated the sea passage from Korea to northeast China. In September the Japanese Navy heavily damaged the Beiyang Fleet at the Battle of the Yalu River, though the Chinese troopships were successful in landing their troops not far from the Sino-Korean border.

With the Beiyang Fleet defeated, the Japanese Navy began a siege of Port Arthur while the Japanese Second Army advanced on the city through Manchuria and the Japanese First Army crossed the Yalu River to form another advance by land. After a series of battles on the Liaodong Peninsula the First Division of the Second Army, led by General Yamaji, drew up around Port Arthur in late November. On 18 November 1894, the Japanese movement down the peninsula was temporarily frustrated and the army returned to find that their abandoned wounded troops had been severely mutilated, with hands and feet cut off. Others had been burned alive. The city was evacuated with residents fleeing westward by land or sea into China.

The Qing government placed bounties on prisoners of war, or their heads or other body parts; during the Sino-Japanese War the bounty was 50 taels. Some Chinese soldiers had mutilated several Japanese soldiers' dead bodies and displayed them at the entrance of the city, infuriating the Japanese. Several vowed revenge, including Lieutenant Kijirō Nanbu. After only token resistance, the city fell to Japanese troops late on the morning of 21 November. What followed was a massacre of the remaining inhabitants of Port Arthur by the Japanese troops.

== Massacre ==
Japanese troops entered Port Arthur at about 2:00 p.m. Upon seeing the mutilated remains of their fallen comrades, they took to killing those who remained in the town. Several accounts of the events were recorded by members of the Japanese forces, such as the following by a member of the 1st Division:

As we entered the town of Port Arthur, we saw the head of a Japanese soldier displayed on a wooden stake. This filled us with rage and a desire to crush any Chinese soldier. Anyone we saw in the town, we killed. The streets were filled with corpses, so many they blocked our way. We killed people in their homes; by and large, there wasn't a single house without from three to six dead. Blood was flowing and the smell was awful. We sent out search parties. We shot some, hacked at others. The Chinese troops just dropped their arms and fled. Firing and slashing, it was unbounded joy. At this time, our artillery troops were at the rear, giving three cheers [banzai] for the emperor.

— Makio Okabe, diary

The massacre lasted the next few days, and was witnessed by several Western observers, including Frederic Villiers, James Creelman who wrote for the New York World and Thomas Cowan, correspondent for The Times. Cowan described what he saw:

Thursday, Friday, Saturday, and Sunday were spent by the soldiery in murder and pillage from dawn to dark, in mutilation, in every conceivable kind of nameless atrocity, until the town became a ghastly Inferno to be remembered with a fearsome shudder until one's dying day. I saw corpses of women and children, three or four in the streets, more in the water ... Bodies of men strewed the streets in hundreds, perhaps thousands, for we could not count – some with not a limb unsevered, some with heads hacked, cross-cut, and split lengthwise, some ripped open, not by chance but with careful precision, down and across, disembowelled and dismembered, with occasionally a dagger or bayonet thrust in the private parts. I saw groups of prisoners tied together in a bunch with their hands behind their backs, riddled with bullets for five minutes and then hewn to pieces. I saw a junk (ship) stranded on the beach, filled with fugitives of either sex and of all ages, struck by volley after volley until – I can say no more.

— Thomas Cowan, private letter

== Death toll ==
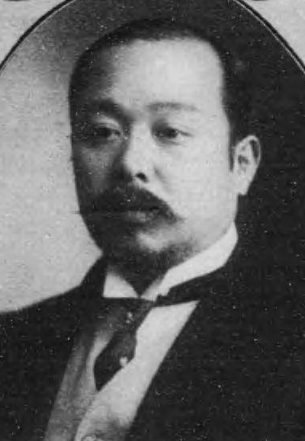
Sakuye Takahashi, legal adviser for the Imperial Japanese Navy, tried to refute the allegations.

The scale and nature of the killing continues to be debated. Estimates range from 2,600 to 60,000 dead. Japanese participants reported mountains of corpses, yet the number of dead was never officially calculated. Cowan, who was a witness, reported that the "bodies of men strewed the streets in hundreds, perhaps thousands, for we could not count" and that there were "more in the water." Creelman, also a witness, asserted that up to 60,000 were killed, with only 36 spared.

According to a scouting report sent to Viceroy Li Hongzhang by the local official Liu Hanfang (劉含芳) soon after the massacre, 2,600~2,700 civilians were killed within the city. However, many more were slaughtered in the hills surrounding the city and for these they had no reliable count, and soldiers were not included in this count. In 1948, the Chinese Communist Party built the cemetery "万忠墓" ("Wanzhong Tomb") and marked the total deaths to be 20,000, which included soldiers killed in action and fleeing soldiers disguised as civilians. The 20,000 figure became the orthodox figure in Chinese communist sources.

Some late-20th century Japanese sources repeat the death toll of 60,000 given by Creelman, but Stewart Lone, writing in 1994, one hundred years after the fact, attempted to discredit Creelman's claim, stating "[that] the entire city population was not massacred, however, is suggested by the speed with which Port Arthur's streets again filled after the Japanese occupation: had the civilian population been literally decimated or destroyed, it is unlikely that others would have ventured to trade and work under Japanese occupation."

== Aftermath ==
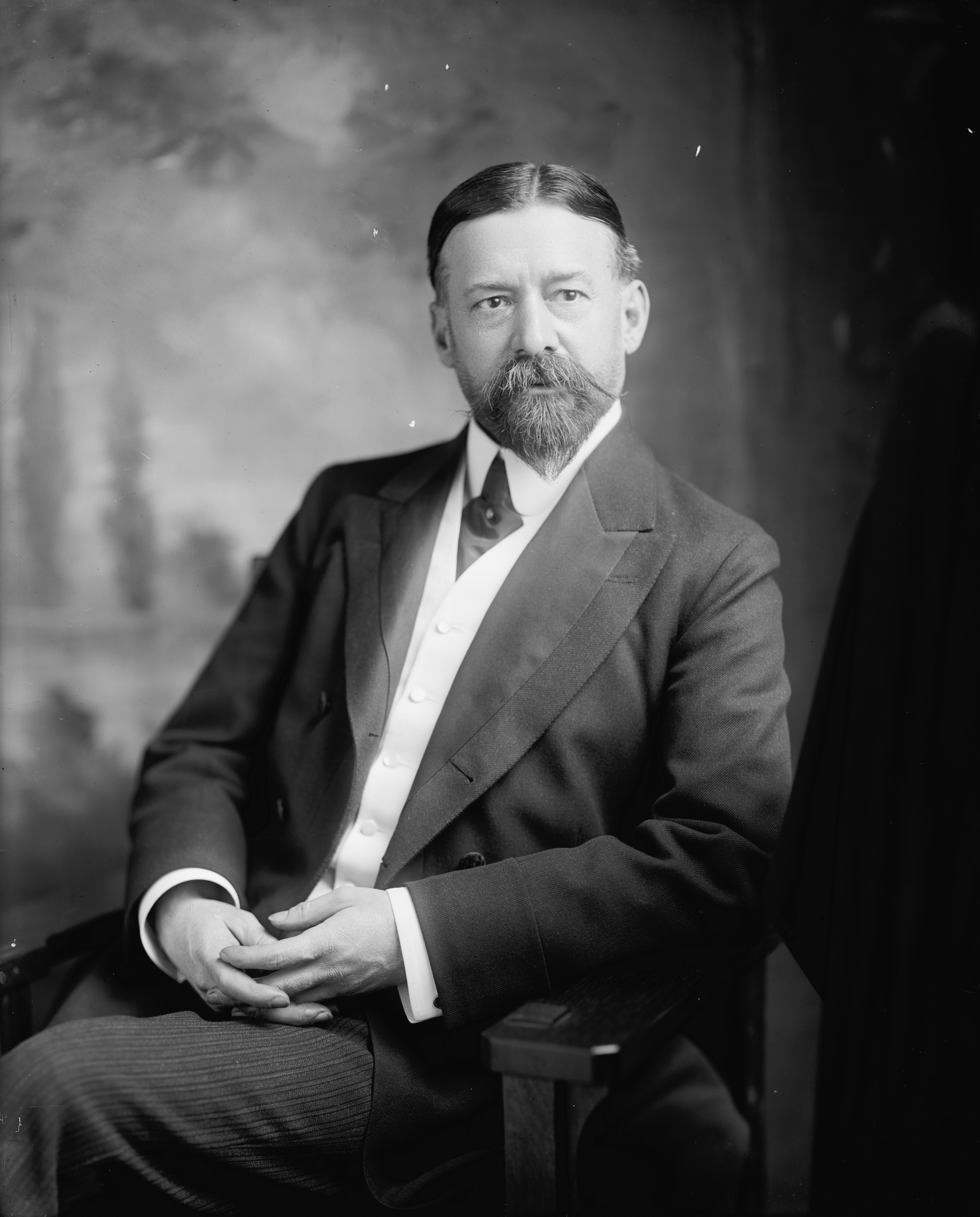
Canadian reporter James Creelman wrote the first article on the massacre.

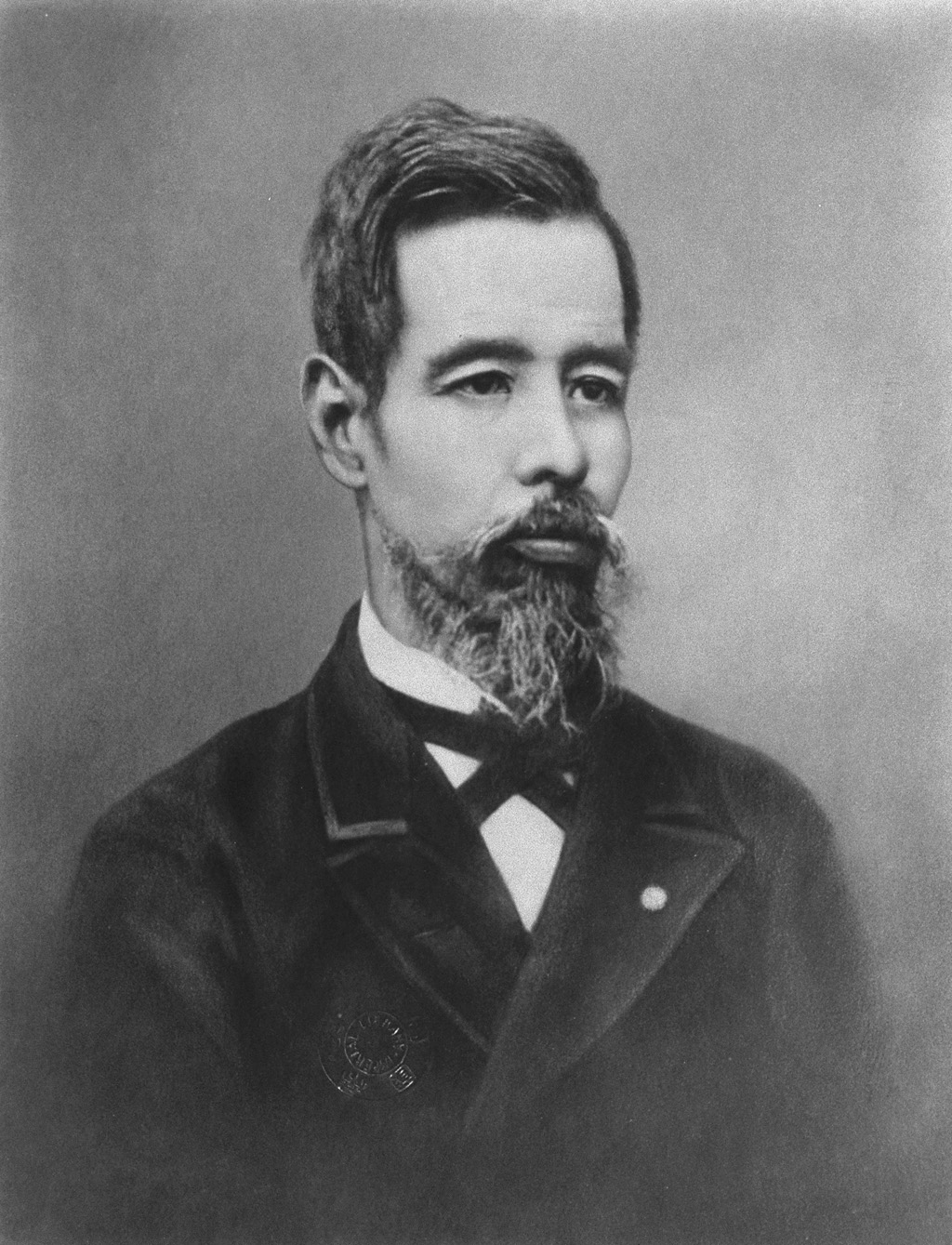
Japanese foreign minister Mutsu Munemitsu announced an inquiry that resulted in no punishments

The string of Japanese victories at Pyongyang and then at the Battle of the Yalu River had increased what had until then been only lukewarm Western interest in the war. By the time of the assault on Port Arthur, a number of Western reporters were attached to the Japanese Second Army. Western reporting on the massacre was controversial. Most correspondents such as the Canadian reporter James Creelman, writing for the New York World, and Frederic Villiers, a writer and illustrator for the London Black and White, described a wide scale and cold-blooded massacre, while Amédée Baillot de Guerville alleged in the pages of the New York Herald that no such massacre had occurred. Writing a decade later, de Guerville amended this view, claiming that though some 120 civilians were killed it still had not been a massacre.

Foreign reporters had to wait until they had left the area before they could file their stories, which the Japanese censors would otherwise have suppressed. At first, the incident garnered little attention: a one-sentence report in The Times on 26 November stated: "Great slaughter is reported to have taken place." James Creelman was the first to report on the massacre in a front-page article that declared:

The Japanese troops entered Port Arthur on Nov. 21 and massacred practically the entire population in cold blood. ... The defenseless and unarmed inhabitants were butchered in their houses and their bodies were unspeakably mutilated. There was an unrestrained reign of murder which continued for three days. The whole town was plundered with appalling atrocities. ... It was the first stain upon Japanese civilization. The Japanese in this instance relapsed into barbarism.

— James Creelman, New York World, 12 December 1894

Other newspapers soon followed with detailed reports. The reports hurt Japan's international image and threatened the progress of negotiations with the United States to bring an end to the unequal treaties Japan had been made to sign in the 1850s. Japanese foreign minister Mutsu Munemitsu announced an investigation, publishing these intentions in the New York World, and promised not to interfere with foreign correspondents. On 16 December, the Foreign Ministry released a statement to the press, asserting the atrocities were exaggerations:

The Japanese Government desires no concealment of the events at Port Arthur. On the contrary, it is investigating rigidly for the purpose of fixing the exact responsibility and is taking measures essential to the reputation of the empire. ... Japanese troops transported with rage at the mutilation of their comrades by the enemy, broke through all restraints ... [and] exasperated by the wholesale attempts [by Chinese soldiers] at escape disguised at citizens, they inflicted vengeance without discrimination. ... the victims, almost without exception, were soldiers wearing the stolen clothes of citizens.

The Japanese press generally avoided reporting on the massacre, or dismissed it, as when the Jiyū Shinbun called allegations "an invidious desire to detract from the glory of the Japanese Army". The Shin Chōya accused Westerners of exaggerating the extent of the atrocities, and of hypocrisy in light of the atrocities they had committed throughout the East, stating that "the history of savage nations that have come in contact with Christian Occidentals is all but written in blood". Some questioned Creelman's reliability, and a rumour spread that he left for Shanghai after the fall of Port Arthur to work for the Chinese government. The Japan Weekly Mail, on the other hand, castigated the Japanese army in several articles. Attempts to launch an inquiry met resistance from those who wanted it covered up. The inquiry resulted in no punishments given out.

Domestic instability kept the Chinese government under pressure to conceal the defeat, rather than castigate the Japanese for the atrocities. The China Gazette reported on the attempted cover-up: "Telegraphic notices have been sent ... all over the empire by the officials saying that a wicked report has been set on foot by the enemy that they have captured Port Arthur, but it was utterly untrue, the place being garrisoned by 30,000 brave Chinese soldiers who would never give it up to the Japanese." As late as a month later, the China Gazette reported the defeat remained unknown even to many government officials. The pro-Japanese North-China Herald attempted to defend the perpetrators of the massacre by proposing "The circumstances were such as might have taxed the control of any invading force."

The incident strained the delicate foreign relations Japan had been dealing with. The war itself hurt Japan's relations with Britain, and threatened to hurt Japan's renegotiation of treaties with the United States. The incident coloured Western perceptions of Japan as barbarians under a thin veil of civilization. These perceptions contributed to anti-Japanese sentiment in North America in the early 20th century, which would continue through World War II. In the aftermath of the incident, Imperial Russia established a colonial and naval presence in Port Arthur. The Russian naval base was a focus of Japanese attacks in the Russo-Japanese War a decade later.

== See also ==
- List of massacres in China

== Notes ==
=== Works cited ===
- Lone, Stewart (1994). Japan's First Modern War: Army and Society in the Conflict with China, 1894–95. Palgrave Macmillan UK. ISBN 978-0-230-38975-5.
- Olender, Piotr (2014). Sino-Japanese Naval War 1894–1895. MMPBooks. ISBN 978-83-63678-51-7.
- Paine, S. C. M. (2005). The Sino-Japanese War of 1894–1895: Perceptions, Power, and Primacy. Cambridge University Press. ISBN 978-0-521-61745-1.

== Further sources ==
- Allan, James. Under the Dragon Flag. London: William Heinemann, 1898. (This purports to be a true account of the massacre by a young Englishman who had been trapped in the city at the time of its fall.)
- Creelman, James. On the Great Highway, the Wanderings and Adventures of a Special Correspondent. Boston:Lothrop Publishing, 1901.
- De Guerville, A. B. "In Defense of Japan. The Alleged Atrocities at Port Arthur Denied", Leslie’s Weekly (3 January 1895).
- De Guerville, A. B. Au Japon. Paris: Alphonse Lemerre, 1904.
- Dorwart, Jeffrey M. "James Creelman, the New York World and the Port Arthur Massacre", Journalism Quarterly, 50 (4) (1973):697–701.
- Hardin, Thomas L. “American Press and Public Opinion in the First Sino-Japanese War", Journalism Quarterly, 50 (1) (1973):53–59.
- Kane, Daniel C. "Each of Us in His Own Way: Factors Behind Conflicting Accounts of the Massacre at Port Arthur," Journalism History, vol. 31 (1) (Spring 2005):23–33.
- Villiers, Frederic, The Truth about Port Arthur The North American Review, vol. 160, no. 460 (March 1895):325–331.
