= Jakob Meckel =

German general (1842–1905)

Jacob Meckel
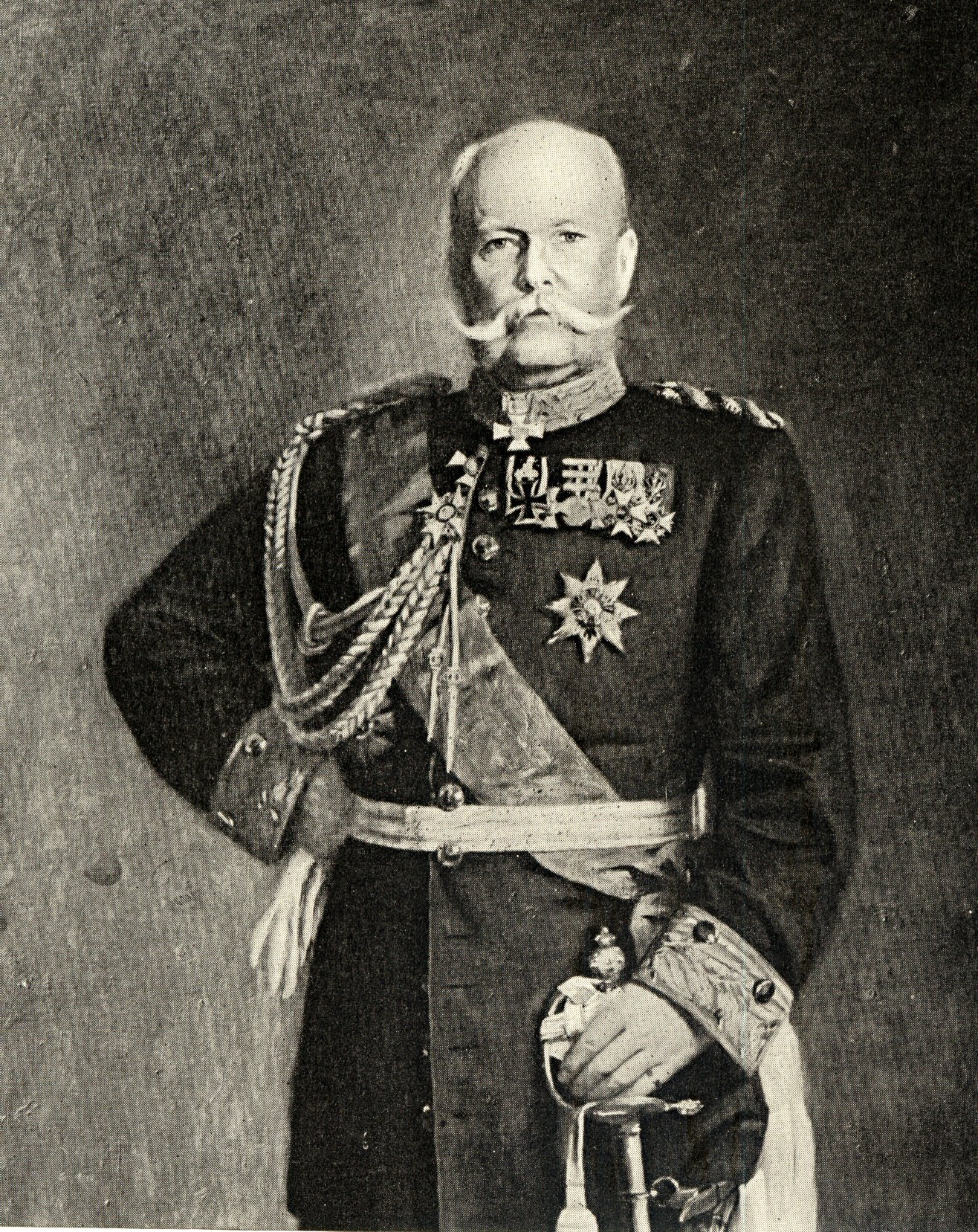
- Jacob Meckel
- Born: 28 March 1842; Cologne, Prussia
- Died: 5 July 1906 (aged 64); Lichterfelde, German Empire
- Military career
- Allegiance: (Kingdom of Prussia) Prussia; German Empire; Empire of Japan (1885–88)
- Branch: Prussian Army
- Service years: 1860–1896
- Rank: Major General
- Conflicts: Austro-Prussian War: Battle of Königgrätz; Franco-Prussian War
- Awards: Order of the Red Eagle (2nd class with oak leaves); Order of the Rising Sun (2nd class); Iron Cross (2nd class)

Klemens Wilhelm Jacob Meckel (28 March 1842 – 5 July 1906) was a general in the Prussian army and foreign advisor to the government of Meiji period Japan.

== Biography ==
Meckel was born in Cologne, Rhine Province, Prussia and joined the Prussian Army in 1860 as part of the 68th Infantry Regiment. He served in the Austro-Prussian War, fighting at Königgrätz, and was a veteran of the Franco-Prussian War. During the latter he was decorated with the Iron Cross.

The Chile government had Meckel as their first choice when they sought a German military official to help modernize the Chile military. However, Meckel had accepted the Japanese government's offer, which led the Chile government to hire Emil Körner instead.

=== In Japan ===
After the government of Meiji period Japan decided to model the Imperial Japanese Army after the Prussian army, following the German victory over the French in the Franco-Prussian War, Meckel (with the rank of major at the time) was invited to Japan as a professor at the Army Staff College and as an advisor to the Imperial Japanese Army General Staff. In response to a Japanese request, Prussian Chief of Staff Helmuth von Moltke selected Meckel. He worked closely with future Prime Ministers General Katsura Tarō and General Yamagata Aritomo, and with army strategist General Kawakami Soroku. Meckel made numerous recommendations which were implemented, including reorganization of the command structure of the army into divisions and regiments, thus increasing mobility, strengthening the army logistics and transportation structure, with the major army bases connected by railways, establishing artillery and engineering regiments as independent commands, and revising the universal conscription system to abolish virtually all exceptions. A bust of Meckel was sited in front of the Japanese Army Staff College from 1909 through 1945.

Although his period in Japan (1885–1888) was relatively short, Meckel had a tremendous impact on the development of the Japanese military. He is credited with having introduced Clausewitz's military theories and the Prussian concept of war games (Kriegspiel) in a process of refining tactics. By training some sixty of the highest-ranking Japanese officers of the time in tactics, strategy and organization, he was able to replace the previous influences of the French advisors with his own philosophies. Meckel especially reinforced Hermann Roesler's ideal of subservience to the Emperor by teaching his pupils that Prussian military success was a consequence of the officer class's unswerving loyalty to their sovereign Emperor, however unswerving loyalty to superiors, in particular unswerving loyalty to the Emperor, was already an ideal in Japan, with the unswerving loyalty to the Emperor being expressly codified in Articles XI–XIII of the Meiji Constitution.

Meckel's reforms are credited with Japan's overwhelming victory over China in the First Sino-Japanese War of 1894–1895.

However, Meckel's tactical over-reliance on the use of infantry in offensive campaigns was later considered to have contributed to the large number of Japanese casualties in the subsequent Russo-Japanese War of 1904–1905.

=== On the German General Staff ===
On his return to Germany, Meckel first served in the 57th Infantry Regiment before becoming commander of the 88th Infantry Regiment in the Fortress of Mainz. He subsequently was promoted to major general in 1894, by this time being heading the military history department of the German General Staff. He also edited the 2nd and 3rd editions of Paul Bronsart von Schellendorff's Duties of the General Staff ('Der Dienst des Generalstabes). He became a senior department head (Oberquartiermeister) in 1895. However he was disliked by German Emperor Wilhelm II, who opposed his elevation into the ranks of Prussian peerage. He eventually was reassigned to command the 8th Infantry Brigade, but retired from active service shortly thereafter. He settled in Lichterfelde, near Berlin, and died there on July 5, 1906.
