= Kawakami Soroku =

Viscount, Chief of Japanese Imperial Army General Staff Office

Viscount Kawakami Sōroku
- 川上 操六
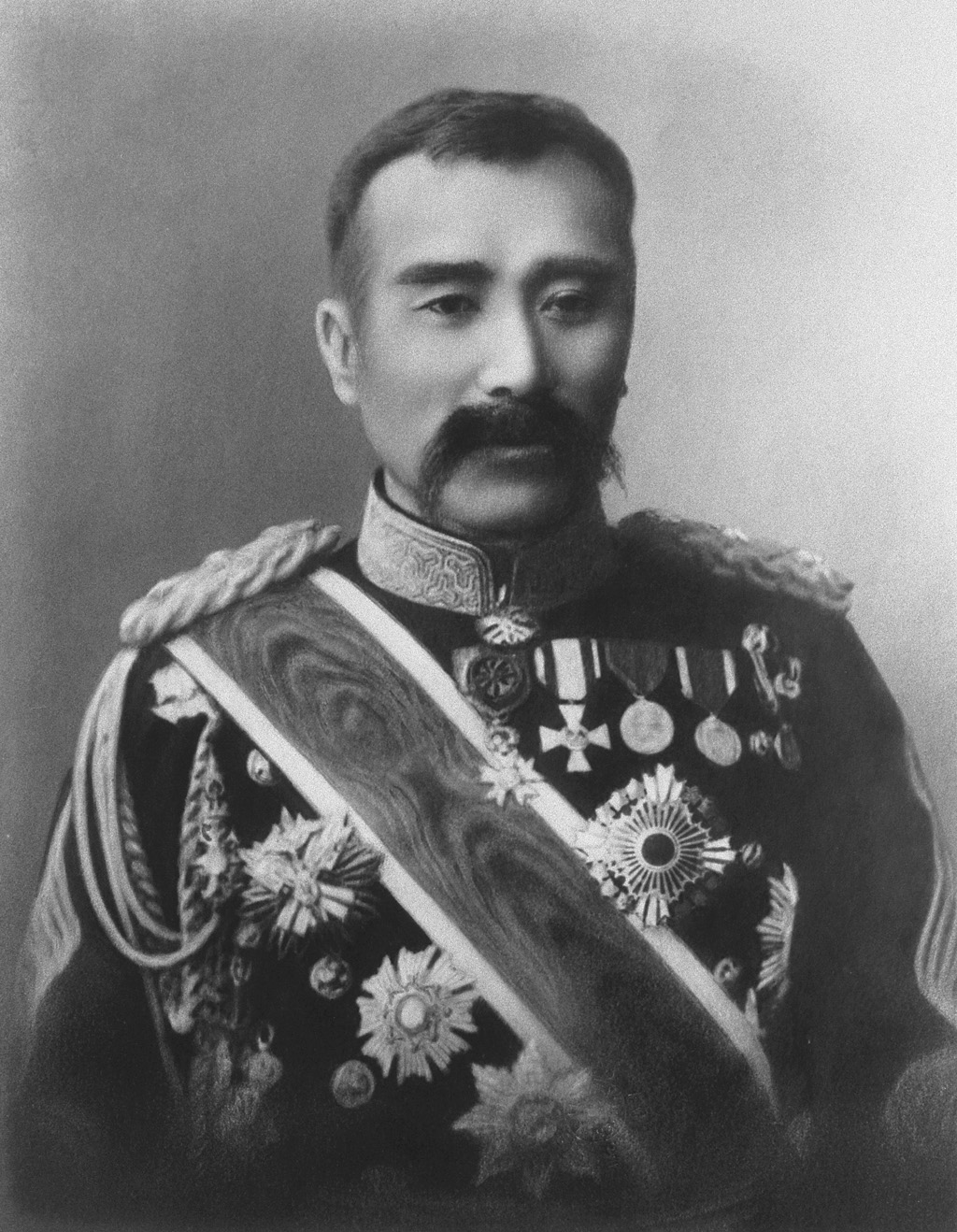

Chief of the Imperial Japanese Army General Staff Office
- In office January 20, 1898 – May 11, 1899
- Monarch: Meiji
- Preceded by: Prince Komatsu Akihito
- Succeeded by: Ōyama Iwao

Personal details
- Born: November 11, 1848 Kagoshima, Satsuma domain, Japan
- Died: May 11, 1899 (aged 50) Tokyo, Japan
- Awards: Order of the Rising Sun (1st class); Order of the Golden Kite (2nd class); Order of the Rising Sun (1st class with Paulownia Blossoms, Grand Cordon); Grand Order of the Chrysanthemum

Military service
- Allegiance: Empire of Japan
- Branch/service: Imperial Japanese Army
- Years of service: 1871 -1899
- Rank: General
- Battles/wars: Boshin War; Donghak Peasant Rebellion; First Sino-Japanese War

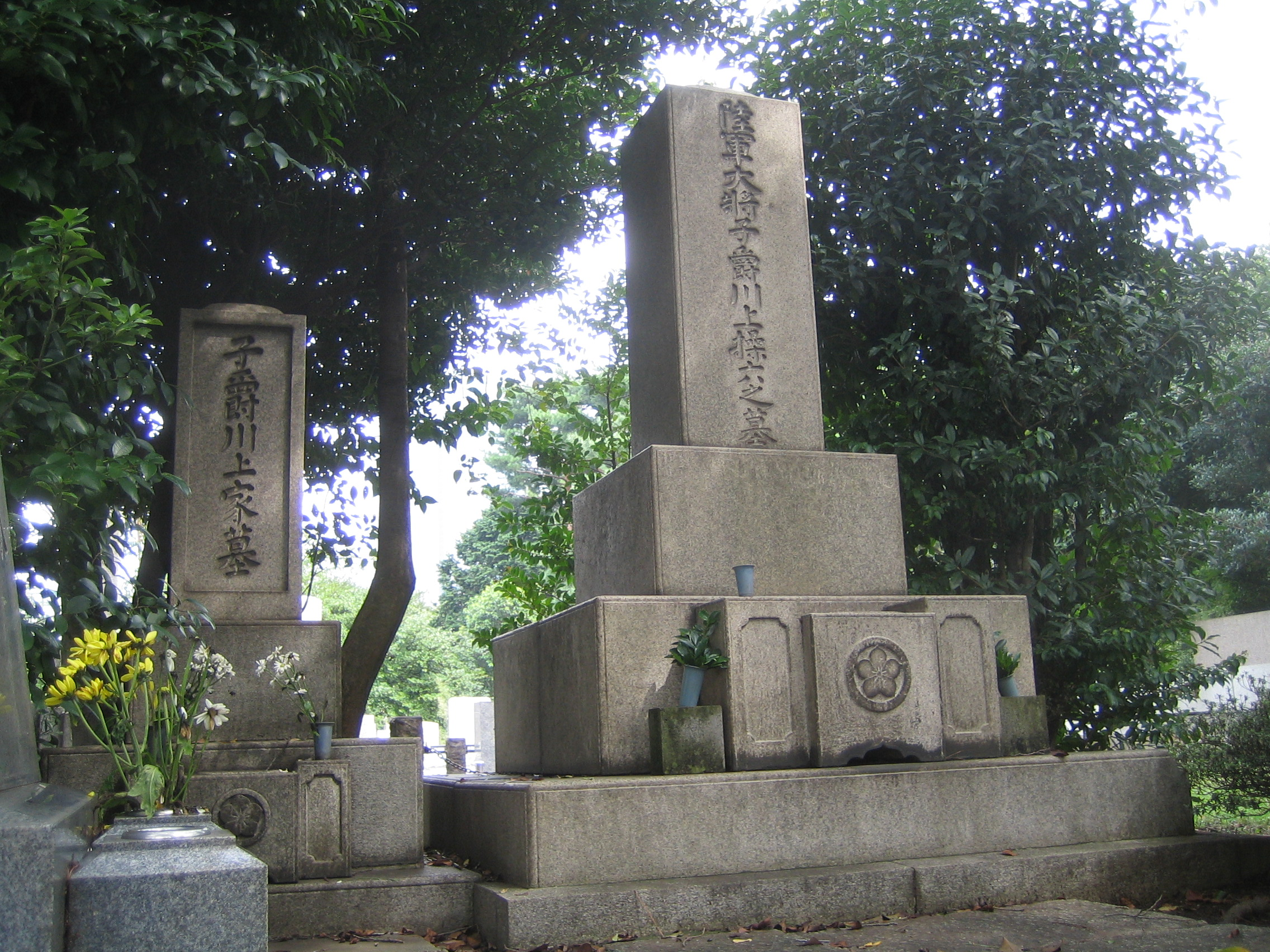
Grave of Kawakami Soroku

Viscount Kawakami Sōroku (川上 操六; 11 November 1848 – 11 May 1899), was a general and one of the chief military strategists in the Imperial Japanese Army during the Donghak Peasant Revolution and First Sino-Japanese War.

== Biography ==
Born in Satsuma Domain to a samurai-class family, Kawakami fought on the Imperial side for the Meiji Restoration against the forces for the Tokugawa shogunate starting with the Battle of Toba–Fushimi. He distinguished himself by his defense of the besieged Kumamoto Castle in the Boshin War.

Afterwards, he came to Tokyo to assist with the founding of the new Imperial Japanese Army. He rose rapidly through the ranks, and helped quell the Satsuma Rebellion.

In 1884, he accompanied Ōyama Iwao to study military science in various countries of Europe, especially Prussia. After returning home, he became a major general and vice-chief of the Imperial Japanese Army General Staff. In 1887, he returned to Europe again to study military science further in Germany. In 1890, he became a lieutenant general.

During the First Sino-Japanese War, Kawakami served as senior military staff officer on the Imperial General Headquarters, and was known as a brilliant strategist. After the successful conclusion of that war, he was awarded with the Order of the Rising Sun (1st class), and elevated to the nobility with the title of shishaku (viscount) under the kazoku peerage system.

Kawakami was posthumously awarded the Order of the Golden Kite (2nd class), Order of the Rising Sun (1st class with Paulownia Blossoms, Grand Cordon) and the Grand Order of the Chrysanthemum. His grave is at Aoyama Cemetery in Tokyo.
