= Order of the Paulownia Flowers =

Japanese order

Order of the Paulownia Flowers 桐花章
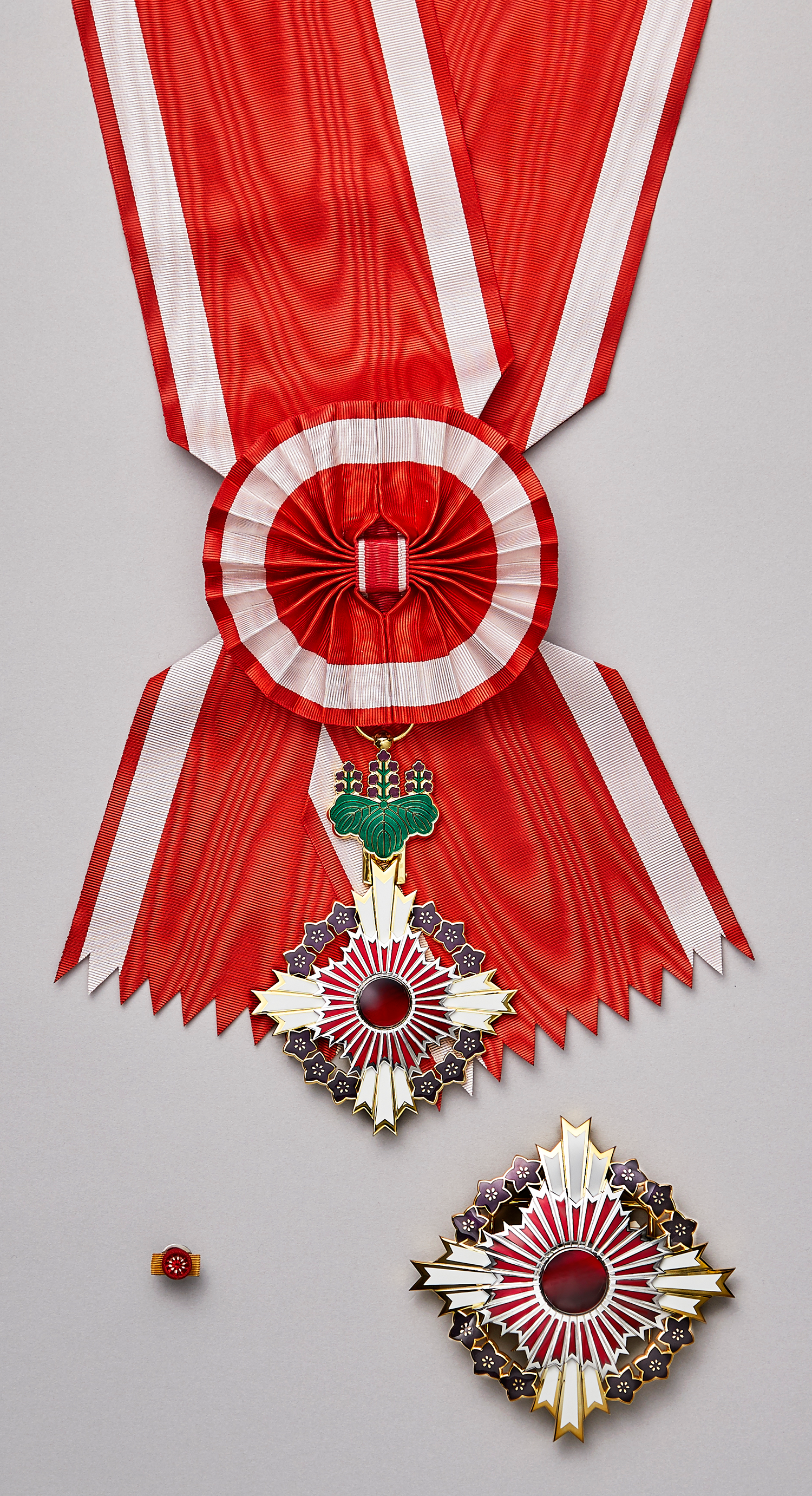
- Grand Cordon of the Order of the Paulownia Flowers

Awarded by the Emperor of Japan
- Type: Order
- Eligibility: Individuals with many years of outstanding accomplishments, particularly in public and political life.
- Status: Currently constituted
- Sovereign: HM The Emperor
- Grades: Grand Cordon

Precedence
- Next (higher): Order of the Chrysanthemum
- Next (lower): Order of the Rising Sun; Order of the Sacred Treasure; Order of the Precious Crown; Order of Culture
- Ribbon bar of the order

The Order of the Paulownia Flowers (桐花章, Tōka shō) is an order presented by the Japanese government. The award was established in 1888 during the Meiji Restoration as the highest award in the Order of the Rising Sun and has been an Order in its own right since 2003. The only grade of the order is Grand Cordon of the Order of the Paulownia Flowers (桐花大綬章, Tōka daijushō), which ranks higher than the Order of the Rising Sun, the Order of the Sacred Treasure, the Order of the Precious Crown, and the Order of Culture and lower than the Order of the Chrysanthemum.

Traditionally, the order has been conferred upon eminent statesmen, former prime ministers and senior cabinet ministers, diplomats and judges. It may be conferred posthumously, and is the highest regularly conferred honor in the Japanese honours system. Awards are not made annually; only 24 individuals have been decorated with the order since 2003: 18 Japanese (three posthumously), three Americans (one of Japanese descent, United States Senator Daniel Inouye), one Indian (former Prime Minister of India Manmohan Singh), one Singaporean (the first Prime Minister of Singapore Lee Kuan Yew, awarded posthumously) and one Malaysian (the fourth and seventh Prime Minister of Malaysia, Mahathir Mohamad).

== Insignia ==
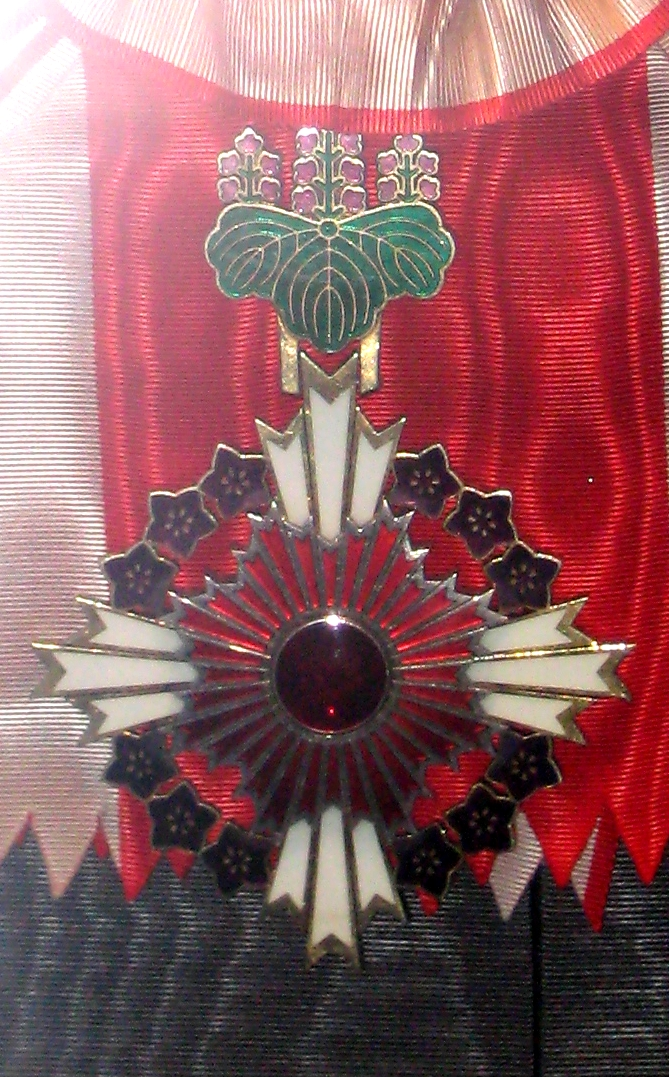
Badge of the Grand Cordon of the Order of the Paulownia Flowers

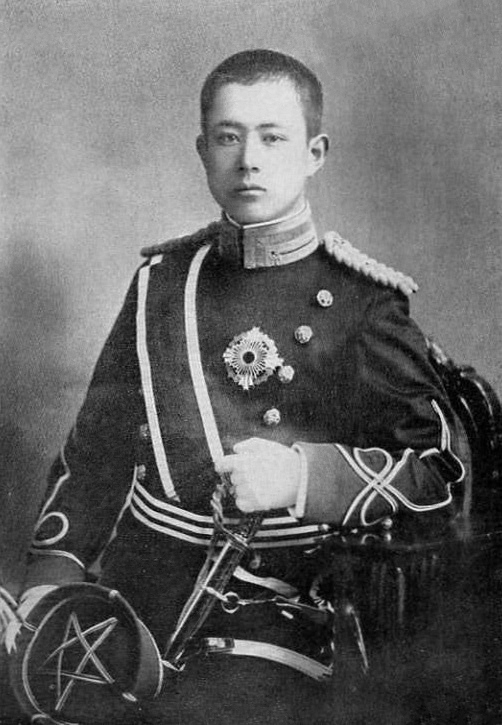
Prince Naruhisa Kitashirakawa

The badge for the Order is a gilt cross with white enameled rays, bearing a central emblem of a red enameled sun disc surrounded by red rays, and with three paulownia blossoms between each arm of the cross. It is suspended from three enameled paulownia leaves on a sash in red with white border stripes, and is worn on the right shoulder.

The star for the Order is the same as the badge, but without the paulownia leaves suspension. It is worn on the left chest.

== Complete listing of ordinary (non-royal) recipients of the Order ==
=== Ordinary recipients of the Order of the Rising Sun with Paulownia Flowers (1888–2003) ===
Information from the corresponding article in the Japanese Wikipedia

==== Awards to living recipients ====
- Itō Hirobumi (11 February 1889)
- Ōyama Iwao (5 August 1895)
- Saigō Tsugumichi (5 August 1895)
- Yamagata Aritomo (5 August 1895)
- Kuroda Kiyotaka (20 August 1895)
- Konoe Tadahiro (26 September 1895)
- Inoue Kaoru (7 October 1895)
- Tokudaiji Sanetsune (7 October 1895)
- Matsukata Masayoshi (31 October 1899)
- Hijikata Hisamoto (16 July 1903)
- Kawamura Sumiyoshi (26 December 1903)
- Itō Sukeyuki (1 April 1906)
- Oku Yasukata (1 April 1906)
- Kawamura Kageaki (1 April 1906)
- Kuroki Tamemoto (1 April 1906)
- Kodama Gentarō (1 April 1906)
- Komura Jutarō (1 April 1906)
- Sakuma Samata (1 April 1906)
- Sasaki Takayuki (1 April 1906)
- Tanaka Fujimaro (1 April 1906)
- Tanaka Mitsuaki (1 April 1906)
- Terauchi Masatake (1 April 1906)
- Nogi Maresuke (1 April 1906)
- Nozu Michitsura (1 April 1906)
- Hasegawa Yoshimichi (1 April 1906)
- Hayashi Tadasu (1 April 1906)
- Higashikuze Michiyoshi (1 April 1906)
- Fukuoka Takachika (1 April 1906)
- Saionji Kinmochi (14 September 1907)
- Hayashi Tomoyuki (5 November 1907)
- Teruhisa Komatsu (3 November 1908)
- Oogimachisanjō Michika (4 January 1909)
- Matsudaira Norikata (6 January 1910)
- Ōkuma Shigenobu (29 April 1910)
- Sone Arasuke (29 August 1910)
- Tani Tateki (9 February 1911)
- Ōshima Yoshimasa (17 June 1912)
- Kagawa Keizō (5 August 1914)
- Matsuoka Yasutake (10 November 1915)
- Katō Takaaki (14 July 1916)
- Yoshikawa Akimasa (20 March 1917)
- Kabayama Sukenori (12 May 1917)
- Yamao Yōzō (12 December 1917)
- Motono Ichirō (16 September 1918)
- Hirata Tosuke (24 May 1919)
- Kataoka Shichirō (7 January 1920)
- Kiyoura Keigo (4 September 1920)
- Itō Miyoji (7 September 1920)
- Uchida Kosai (7 September 1920)
- Katō Tomosaburō (7 September 1920)
- Gotō Shinpei (7 September 1920)
- Chinda Sutemi (7 September 1920)
- Hara Takashi (7 September 1920)
- Makino Nobuaki (7 September 1920)
- Inoue Yoshika (1 November 1920)
- Uehara Yūsaku (1 November 1920)
- Utsunomiya Tarō (1 November 1920)
- Ōshima Ken'ichi (1 November 1920)
- Ōtani Kikuzō (1 November 1920)
- Shimamura Hayao (1 November 1920)
- Nakamura Yūjirō (1 November 1920)
- Toda Shidomo (1 October 1921)
- Hamao Arata (25 November 1921)
- Soga Sukenori (28 December 1923)
- Okano Keijirō (11 February 1924)
- Saitō Makoto (11 February 1924)
- Tokugawa Iesato (11 February 1924)
- Ijuin Hikoyoshi (26 April 1924)
- Takahashi Korekiyo (3 June 1927)
- Hiranuma Kiichirō (21 April 1928)
- Yamashita Gentarō (10 May 1928)
- Asano Nagakoto (10 November 1928)
- Kaneko Kentarō (10 November 1928)
- Shibusawa Eiichi (10 November 1928)
- Hayashi Gonsuke (10 November 1928)
- Wakatsuki Reijirō (10 November 1928)
- Ichiki Kitokuro (28 December 1928)
- Kuratomi Yūzaburō (28 December 1928)
- Suzuki Sōroku (16 June 1930)
- Takarabe Takeshi (11 April 1931)
- Hamaguchi Osachi (29 April 1931)
- Kijuro Shidehara (12 December 1931)
- Inukai Tsuyoshi (6 May 1932)
- Okada Keisuke (21 January 1933)
- Kantarō Suzuki (29 April 1934)
- Nara Takeji (29 April 1934)
- Takashi Hishikari (23 December 1935)
- Ugaki Kazushige (5 August 1936)
- Yamamoto Tatsuo (5 August 1936)
- Ishiguro Tadanori (24 December 1936)
- Mizuno Rentaro (17 April 1938)
- Yuasa Kurahei (7 June 1940)
- Sakatani Yoshio (28 April 1941)
- Kishi Nobusuke (29 April 1967)
- Tanaka Kōtarō (29 April 1970)
- Funada Naka (29 April 1973)
- Shigemune Yūzō (29 April 1973)
- Yokota Kisaburo (29 April 1977)
- Kōno Kenzō (3 November 1977)
- Yasui Ken (3 November 1981)
- Nadao Hirokichi (3 November 1982)
- Nakamura Umekichi (3 November 1983)
- Fukuda Hajime (3 November 1984)
- Fukunaga Kenji (29 April 1986)
- Sakata Michita (3 November 1986)
- Toshiwo Doko (3 November 1986)
- Matsushita Konosuke (29 April 1987)
- Tokunaga Masatoshi (3 November 1989)
- Sakarauchi Yoshio (3 November 1993)
- Yaguchi Koichi (3 November 1993)
- Uno Sōsuke (29 April 1994)
- Tamura Hajime (3 November 1994)
- Kenzaburo Hara (29 April 1996)
- Hara Bunbe (3 November 1996)
- Kusaba Ryōhachi (29 April 1998)
- Tsuchiya Yoshihiko (29 April 1999)
- Itō Sōichirō (29 April 2001)

==== Posthumous awards ====
- Yamada Akiyoshi (14 November 1892)
- Mōri Motonori (24 December 1896)
- Shimazu Tadayoshi (26 December 1897)
- Kawakami Soroku (11 May 1899)
- Ōki Takatō (11 September 1899)
- Sano Jōmin (7 December 1902)
- Soejima Taneomi (31 January 1905)
- Enomoto Takeaki (26 October 1908)
- Okazawa Tadashi (12 December 1908)
- Inoue Hikaru (27 December 1908)
- Nomura Yasushi (24 January 1909)
- Iwakura Tomosada (1 April 1910)
- Takasaki Masakaze (28 February 1912)
- Hitoshi Kanjiro (28 February 1912)
- Tokugawa Yoshinobu (22 November 1913)
- Aoki Shūzō (16 February 1914)
- Matsuda Masahisa (5 March 1914)
- Ōkubo Haruno (26 January 1915)
- Takashima Tomonosuke (11 January 1916)
- Katō Hiroyuki (9 February 1916)
- Nakamuta Kuranosuke (30 March 1916)
- Kamimura Hikonojō (8 August 1916)
- Kuroda Kiyotsuna (23 March 1917)
- Hanabusa Yoshitada (9 July 1917)
- Hachisuka Mochiaki (10 February 1918)
- Itagaki Taisuke (16 July 1919)
- Masataka Kawase (29 September 1919)
- Nakayama Takamaro (25 November 1919)
- Sugi Magoshichirō (3 May 1920)
- Suematsu Kenchō (6 October 1920)
- Ijuin Gorō (13 January 1921)
- Nabeshima Naohiro (19 June 1921)
- Hatano Yoshinao (29 August 1922)
- Hosokawa Junjirō (20 July 1923)
- Tajiri Inejirō (15 August 1923)
- Nanbu Mikao (19 September 1923)
- Nakamura Satoru (29 January 1925)
- Miura Gorō (28 January 1926)
- Hozumi Nobushige (8 April 1926)
- Fujī Kōichi (9 July 1926)
- Ōmori Shoichi (3 March 1927)
- Asada Nobuoki (27 April 1927)
- Katō Sadakichi (5 September 1927)
- Ōsako Naoharu (20 September 1927)
- Yamagata Isaburō (24 September 1927)
- Murakami Kakuichi (15 November 1927)
- Matsukawa Toshitane (7 March 1928)
- Ōshima Hisanao (27 September 1928)
- Hattori Ichizō (25 January 1929)
- Hirayama Narinobu (25 September 1929)
- Tanaka Giichi (29 September 1929)
- Katsunosuke Inoue (3 November 1929)
- Dewa Shigetō (27 January 1930)
- Yashiro Rokurō (30 June 1930)
- Akiyama Yoshifuru (4 November 1930)
- Den Kenjirō (16 November 1930)
- Matsumuro Itasu (16 February 1931)
- Yamakawa Kenjirō (26 June 1931)
- Kuki Ryūichi (18 August 1931)
- Ichinohe Hyoe (12 September 1931)
- Yoshinori Shirakawa (26 May 1932)
- Hidaka Sōnojō (24 July 1932)
- Egi Kazuyuki (23 August 1932)
- Andō Teibi (29 August 1932)
- Nobuyoshi Mutō (27 July 1933)
- Furuichi Kōi (28 January 1934)
- Okada Ryōhei (23 March 1934)
- Nakahashi Tokugorō (25 March 1934)
- Mineichirō Adachi (28 December 1934)
- Tokonami Takejirō (8 September 1935)
- Tomii Masaaki (14 September 1935)
- Jōtarō Watanabe (26 February 1936)
- Kubota Yuzuru (14 April 1936)
- Uryū Sotokichi (11 November 1937)
- Kurino Shin'ichirō (15 November 1937)
- Arai Kentarō (29 January 1938)
- Sakurai Jōji (28 January 1939)
- Kuroda Nagashige (14 June 1939)
- Suzuki Kisaburō (24 June 1940)
- Kawai Misao (11 October 1941)
- Mineo Ōsumi (19 October 1941)
- Ishizuka Eizō (28 July 1942)
- Senjūrō Hayashi (4 February 1943)
- Mineichi Koga (5 May 1944)
- Arima Ryokitsu (11 May 1944)
- Yoshimichi Hara (7 August 1944)
- Nomaguchi Kimuotoko (12 December 1944)
- Uchiyama Kojirō (14 February 1945)
- Ishii Kikujirō (26 May 1945)
- Minami Hiroshi (8 February 1946)
- Matsui Keishirō (4 June 1946)
- Kubota Shizutarō (6 October 1946)
- Mamoru Shigemitsu (26 January 1957)
- Hitoshi Ashida (20 June 1959)
- Hayashi Jōji (5 April 1960)
- Kawai Yahachi (21 July 1960)
- Teijirō Toyoda (21 November 1961)
- Matsuno Tsuruhei (18 October 1962)
- Kichisaburō Nomura (8 May 1964)
- Banboku Ōno (29 May 1964)
- Kenkichi Yoshizawa (5 January 1965)
- Kōno Ichirō (8 July 1965)
- Katsuo Okazaki (10 October 1965)
- Kiyose Ichirō (27 June 1967)
- Matsutarō Shōriki (9 October 1969)
- Kawashima Shōjirō (9 November 1970)
- Kenzō Matsumura (21 August 1971)
- Naotake Satō (18 December 1971)
- Tanzan Ishibashi (25 April 1973)
- Masutani Hidetsugu (18 August 1973)
- Kiichi Aichi (23 November 1973)
- Tatsuo Sato (politician) (12 September 1974)
- Taizō Ishizaka (6 March 1975)
- Ohama Nobumoto (13 February 1976)
- Tetsu Katayama (30 May 1978)
- Uemura Kōgorō (1 August 1978)
- Hori Shigeru (4 March 1979)
- Shiina Etsusaburo (30 September 1979)
- Hoshijima Jirō (3 January 1980)
- Ichiro Nakayama (9 April 1980)
- Maeo Shigesaburō (23 July 1981)
- Ishii Mitsujirō (20 September 1981)
- Ryotaro Azuma (26 May 1983)
- Nagano Shigeo (4 May 1984)
- Ushiba Nobuhiko (31 December 1984)
- Aiichiro Fujiyama (22 February 1985)
- Nishimura Eiichi (15 September 1987)
- Inayama Yoshihiro (9 October 1987)
- Shintaro Abe (15 May 1991)
- Michio Watanabe (15 September 1995)
- Masaru Ibuka (19 December 1997)
- Nikaidō Susumu (3 February 2000)
- Saito Eishiro (22 April 2002)

=== Ordinary recipients of the Order of the Paulownia Flowers (from 2003) ===
Information from the corresponding article in the Japanese Wikipedia

==== Awards to living recipients ====
- Yamaguchi Shigeru (29 April 2005)
- Murayama Tomiichi (29 April 2006)
- Hiraiwa Gaishi (3 November 2006)
- Shoichiro Toyoda (3 November 2007)
- Machida Akira (3 November 2007)
- Kurata Hiroyuki (29 April 2008)
- Tamisuke Watanuki (29 April 2010)
- Niro Shimada (29 April 2010)
- Chikage Oogi (3 November 2010)
- Toshiki Kaifu (29 April 2011)
- Yōhei Kōno (3 November 2011)
- Tsutomu Hata (29 April 2013)
- Hironobu Takesaki (3 November 2015)
- Satsuki Eda (3 November 2016)
- Yoshirō Mori (29 April 2017)

==== Posthumous awards ====
- Yutaka Inoue (22 June 2008)
- Takeo Nishioka (5 November 2011)
- Nobutaka Machimura (1 June 2015)

== Foreign recipients ==
- Pavle Jurišić Šturm (1848–1922), 1917
- Konrad Adenauer (1876–1967)
- John Jellicoe, 1st Earl Jellicoe (1859–1935)
- Yuan Shikai (1859–1916)
- Henry Willard Denison (1846–1914), 1902
- John Fisher, 1st Baron Fisher (1841–1920)
- Edmund Allenby, 1st Viscount Allenby (1861–1936), 1922
- Robert Walker Irwin (1844–1925)
- Douglas MacArthur (1880–1964)
- Ali Osman Pasha (1890)
- Carl Gustaf Emil Mannerheim (1867–1951)
- Mike Mansfield (1903–2001)
- Louis Mountbatten, 1st Marquess of Milford Haven (1854-1921)
- George Shultz (1920–2021)
- Walter Mondale (1928–2021), 3 November 2008
- Howard Baker (1925–2014), 3 November 2008
- Daniel Inouye (1924–2012), 24 June 2011
- François Fillon (1954–)
- Tom Foley (1929–2013), 1995
- Manmohan Singh (1932–2024), 5 November 2014
- Lee Kuan Yew (1923–2015), 23 March 2015
- Mahathir Mohamad (1925-), 2018
- Yi Jae-gak (1874-1935), 1905
- Sarit Thanarat, 1960
- Paribatra Sukhumbandhu, 1909

== See also ==
- Order of Civil Merit (Korea)
- Order of the Nine Gems (Thailand)
- Order of the Bath (UK; Knight Grand Cross equivalent)
- Order of Merit of the Federal Republic of Germany (Grand Cross 1st class equivalent)
- Order of Charles III (Spain)
- Order of Christ (Portugal) and Military Order of Saint James of the Sword (Portugal; Grand Cross)
