= Shigemoto =

Shigemoto (written: 重本) is a Japanese surname. Notable people with the surname include:

- Kotori Shigemoto (重本 ことり, born 1996), Japanese television personality, model, singer and voice actress

Shigemoto (written: 成元) is also a masculine Japanese given name. Notable people with the name include:

- Oi Shigemoto (大井 成元), Japanese ski jumper
