= List of Coastal Fortresses in Japan during World War II =

This is the list of Empire of Japan coastal fortresses in existence during World War II. Fortresses on Japanese archipelago were led by the Commander of the Japanese Metropolitan Fortification System whose headquarters was in Tokyo Bay Fortress. The rest of exterior fortress system in the Provinces was managed in their respective Army or Navy command organizations.

== Fortresses by location ==
=== Chishima and Karafuto ===
- Kita Chishima Special Fortress (北千島臨時要塞)
- Minami Chishima Fortress
- Karafuto Fortress

=== Hokkaidō ===
- Soya Special Fortress (宗谷臨時要塞)
- Hakodate Fortress
- Sapporo Fortress

=== East Honshu ===
- Tsugaru Fortress (津軽要塞)
- Nagano Fortress
- Tokyo Bay Fortress (東京湾要塞)
  - Narashino Permanent Fort (永久堡塁 (習志野))
- Chichijima Fortress (父島要塞)

=== West Honshu and Shikoku ===
- Yura Fortress (由良要塞) at Tomogashima
- Hiroshima Bay Fortress (広島湾要塞 or 呉要塞) - disarmed in 1926
- Genyo Fortress (芸予要塞) at Ōkunoshima - disarmed in 1924
- Nakajo-Wan Fortress
- Hōyo Fortress (豊予要塞) at Hōyo Strait
- Shimonoseki Fortress (下関要塞)
- Maizuru Fortress (舞鶴要塞)
- 60th Fortress
- 61st Fortress
- 65th Fortress
- 66th Fortress

=== Kyushu and Okinawa ===
- Tsushima Fortress (対馬要塞)
- Iki Fortress (壱岐要塞)
- Nagasaki Fortress (長崎要塞)
  - Sasebo Fortress (佐世保要塞) - merged in 1936 with Nagasaki.
- Uchinoura special Fortress (内之浦臨時要塞)
- Amami Ōshima fortress (奄美大島要塞)
- Funauke Special Fortress (船浮臨時要塞) at Iriomote-jima
- Karimata special Fortress (狩俣臨時要塞) at Miyako-jima
- Nakagusuku Bay Fortress (中城湾臨時要塞)

=== Japanese colonies ===
- Eiko bay Fortress (永興湾要塞) in Kumya County, North Korea
- Keelung Fortress (基隆要塞)
- Takao Fortress (高雄要塞) at Kaohsiung
- Hōkotō Fortress (澎湖島要塞)at Penghu
- Jinhae Bay Fortress (鎮海湾要塞)
- Busan Fortress (釜山要塞)
- Rashin Fortress (羅津要塞) at Rason
- Ryojun Fortress (旅順要塞) at Lüshunkou District
- Reisui Special Fortress (麗水臨時要塞) at Yeosu

== Army unit attached to the Fortress system ==
- 36th Fortress Engineer Regiment

== Army Commanders in Fortress system ==
- Kanji Ishiwara: Commanding Officer Maizuru Fortified Zone
- Teiji Imamura: Commandant Tsushima Fortress
- Koji Chichiwa: Commandant Iki Fortress
