= 12th Division (Imperial Japanese Army) =

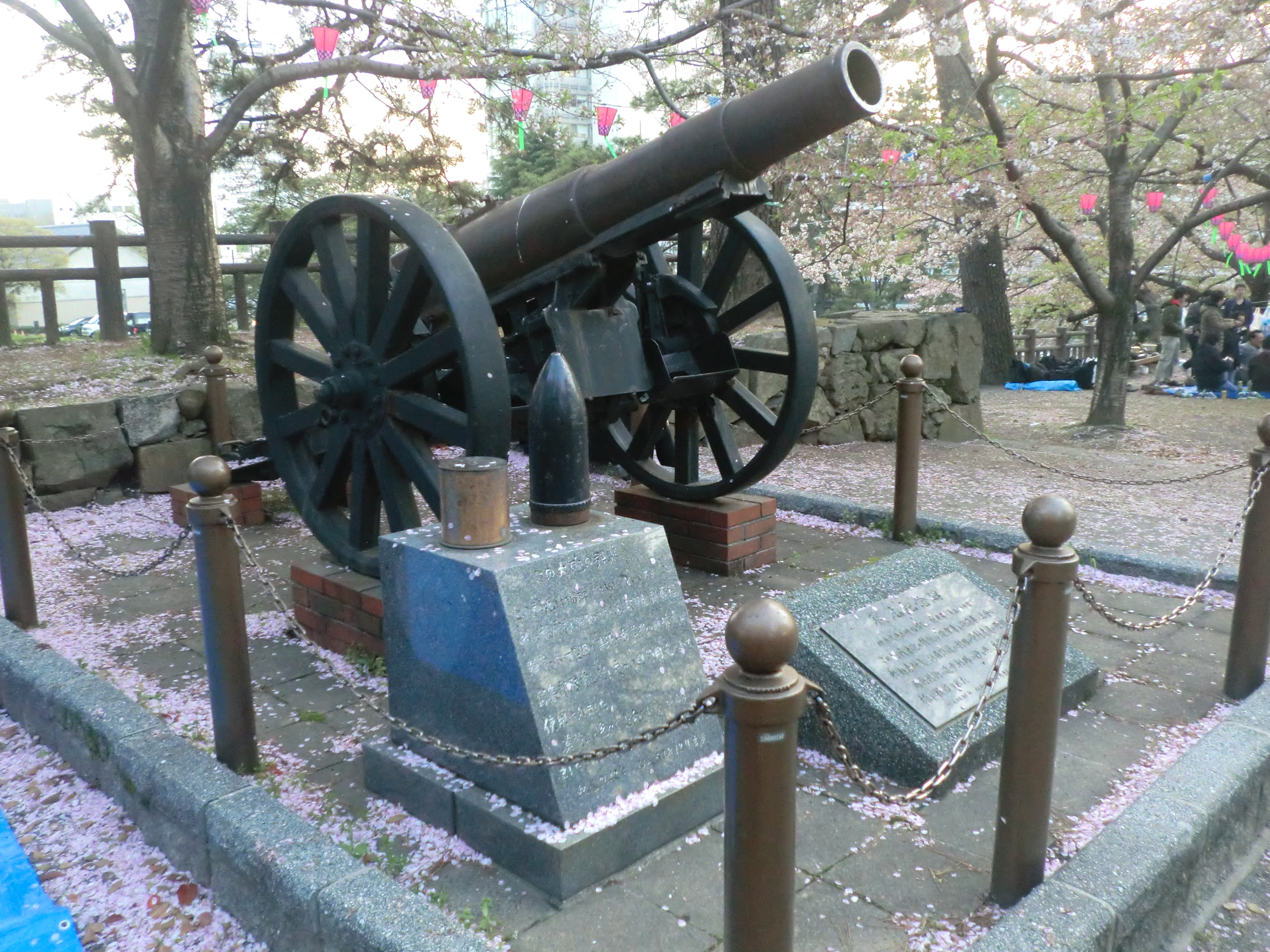
- Type 4 15-cm howitzer at site former IJA 12th Division HQ at Kokura Castle
- Active: 1 October 1898 – 1945
- Country: Empire of Japan
- Branch: Imperial Japanese Army
- Type: Infantry
- Size: 25,000 men
- Garrison/HQ: Kokura, Japan
- Nickname(s): Broadsword Division
- Engagements: Russo-Japanese War; Second Sino-Japanese War; World War II

Commanders
- Notable commanders: Ando Sadami; Uchiyama Kojiro; Oi Shigemoto; Shiba Goro; Hajime Sugiyama; Otozo Yamada; Masakazu Kawabe

The 12th Division (第12師団, Dai Jūni Shidan) was an infantry division in the Imperial Japanese Army. Its tsūshōgō code name was the Broadsword Division (剣兵団, Ken-heidan), and its military symbol was 12D. The 12th Division was one of six new infantry divisions raised by the Imperial Japanese Army after the First Sino-Japanese War (1894–1895). The division received its colors on 1 October 1898 and disbanded in September 1945. Its troops were recruited primarily from communities in the northern portion of the island of Kyūshū and it was originally headquartered within Kokura Castle (now part of the city of Kitakyūshū, Fukuoka)

== Action ==
During the Russo-Japanese War, under the command of Lieutenant General Inoue Hikaru, the division deployed to Manchuria as part of the 1st army. It returned to Kokura after the war, and was deployed again to the continent during the Japanese intervention in Siberia from 19 August 1918. The divisional arsenal in Kokura Castle was used meanwhile to supply other units. The participation in the Siberian Intervention has ended 19 July 1919, but resumed again briefly in 1921. The 12th Division headquarters was relocated to Kurume, another city in Fukuoka prefecture in 1925. In February 1932, following the First Shanghai Incident, the IJA 24th Infantry Regiment of the 12th Division was reinforced with additional artillery units, becoming the 24th Mixed Brigade, which was deployed to Shanghai, and which was later (from April 1936) assigned to Manchukuo. During that period, the 12th division was an elite unit, sporting an disproportionately large amount of firepower and heavy equipment.

In 1940, the division was reorganized into a triangular division, with its IJA 14th Infantry Regiment joining the IJA 25th Division. The 12th Division, under Lieutenant General Masakazu Kawabe was then permanently relocated to Manchukuo from July 1940, coming under the control of the Japanese Third Army in Dongning and was used primarily for policing and anti-partisan activities. The 56th division took the now vacant Kurume headquarters.

However, in 1944 as the Pacific War situation became increasing unfavorable for Japan, the 12th Division was transferred to Hsinchu, Taiwan, where it bolstered the defenses of the 10th area army (and to the 40th army in time it was based on Taiwan in early 1945) against a possible Allied invasion. However, the Allies bypassed Taiwan and landed on Okinawa instead, so the 12th Division ended World War II as a garrison force in Taiwan without having seen combat.

== See also ==
- List of Japanese Infantry Divisions
