= Aide-de-camp to the Emperor of Japan =

Special military official in Japan (1896–1945)

In Japan, the aide-de-camp to the Emperor (侍従武官, jiju bukan) is a special military official whose primary duties are to report military affairs to the Emperor and act as a close attendant (chamberlain). From 1896 through to 1945, a small number of army and naval aides-de-camp were supplied to the Emperor due to his increased status and the risks to him during wartime.

== Background ==
An excerpt from the 113th Imperial decree of Meiji-29 (1896) (明治29年勅令第113号):

Aides-de-camp to the Emperor will perform attendant duties and will relay to him military matters and orders, be present at military reviews [in his name] and accompanying him to formal ceremonies and interviews.

Both Prime Minister Kantarō Suzuki (鈴木貫太郎) and Anami Korechika (阿南惟幾), army ministers at the end of the war, are said to have contributed to the Potsdam Declaration acceptance by means of their responsibilities to Emperor Showa as the grand chamberlain and aide-de-camp to the Emperor in 1929 (Showa-4).

Moreover, to the Crown Prince, the Imperial Family, and the mediatized Korean royal family (Oukouzoku (王公族), the former Korean imperial family), aides-de-camp were also provided. The military officers serving the Oukouzoku wore silver aiguillettes over their uniform.

== List of aides-de-camp ==
=== Senior Aide-de-camp ===
No.	Name	Portrait	Rank	Term of Office	
No.	Name	Portrait	Rank	Start	End
1	Okazawa Kuwashi		Lieutenant general	3 April 1896	6 June 1904
1	Okazawa Kuwashi		General	6 June 1904	December 1908
2	Nakamura Satoru		Lieutenant general	29 December 1908	August 1913
3	Uchiyama Kojirō		Lieutenant general	22 August 1913	10 August 1915
3	Uchiyama Kojirō		General	10 August 1915	November 1922
4	Nara Takeji		Lieutenant general	24 November 1922	20 August 1924
4	Nara Takeji		General	20 August 1924	April 1933
5	Honjō Shigeru		Lieutenant general	6 April 1933	19 June 1933
5	Honjō Shigeru		General	19 June 1933	March 1936
6	Usami Okiie		Lieutenant general	23 March 1936	May 1939
7	Hata Shunroku		General	25 May 1939	August 1939
8	Hasunuma Shigeru		Lieutenant general	31 August 1939	2 December 1940
8	Hasunuma Shigeru		General	2 December 1940	November 1945

=== Army Aide-de-camp ===
- Kuwashi Okazawa: 27 August 1894 – 3 April 1896
- Satoru Nakamura: 30 August 1894 – 12 April 1897
- Tadatomo Hirohata: 30 August 1894 – 31 March 1896
- Minato Watanabe: 7 May 1896 – 25 September 1902
- Nao Sasaki: 14 April 1897 – 25 April 1900
- Shomei Miyamoto: 18 May 1900 – 15 April 1905
- Takatsukasa Hiromichi: 12 June 1902 – 16 February 1910
- Sehei Ito: 25 September 1902 – 11 July 1906
- Jiro Shirai: 15 April 1905 – 22 October 1907
- Yoshiaki Takahashi: 11 July 1906 – 30 November 1909
- Jiro Yamanaka: 22 October 1907 – 5 June 1908
- Heikichi Ueda: 15 June 1908 – 27 November 1912
- Yamane: 2 December 1909 – 27 November 1912
- Takuji Okumura: 16 February 1910 – 22 August 1914
- Masami Muraki: 5 August 1912 – 3 October 1912
- Giichi Ouchi: 5 August 1912 – 3 October 1912
- Giichi Nishi: 5 August 1912 – 3 October 1912
- Yoshikazu Nishi: 27 November 1912 – 21 January 1916
- Toraji Wakami: 17 December 1912 – 25 March 1916
- Tanaka: 22 August 1914 – 9 January 1917
- Tetsugoro Nakata: 21 January 1916 – 6 July 1923
- Tomokatsu Bito: 30 March 1916 – 25 July 1919
- Yamane: 1 April 1916 – 2 August 1917
- Tametaro Watanabe: 19 December 1916 – 15 August 1922
- Giichi Ouchi: 24 July 1918 – 13 May 1922
- Yasuzaburo Kuwata: 24 July 1918 – 15 December 1924
- Yoshikazu Nishi: 27 December 1919 – 26 July 1927
- Motoyoshi Mibu: 25 November 1921 – 15 August 1922
- Toyoki Hamada: 25 November 1921 – 7 August 1925
- Rikutaro Oshima: 13 May 1922 – 26 July 1927
- Masahiko Hattori: 15 August 1922 – 2 December 1925
- Bunzaburō Kawagishi: 4 February 1924 – 1 August 1929
- Yano: 7 August 1925 – 25 December 1926
- Shigeru Hasunuma: 2 December 1925 – 25 December 1926
- Hasunuma: 25 December 1926 – 1 August 1931
- Yano: 25 December 1926 – 6 March 1930
- Akitomo Segawa: 26 July 1927 – 1 August 1931
- Korechika Anami: 1 August 1929 – 1 August 1933
- Kazumoto Machijiri: 20 May 1930 – 15 March 1935
- Yasuhide Ishida: 1 August 1931 – 1 August 1935
- Bunzaburo Kawagishi: 1 August 1931 – 10 December 1934
- Tetsuzo Nakajima: 1 August 1933 – 1 March 1937
- Kozo Goto: 10 December 1933 – 15 July 1938
- Yasushi Sakai: 15 March 1935 – 2 August 1937
- Tsunamasa Shidei: 1 August 1935 – 9 March 1939
- Kazumoto Machijiri: 1 March 1937 – 5 October 1937
- Tsunenori Shimizu: 2 August 1937 – 1 March 1941
- Rikichiro Sawamoto: 5 October 1937 – 23 September 1941
- Shikanosuke Tokunaga: 15 July 1938 – 2 March 1942
- Akira Yokoyama: 9 March 1939 – 20 December 1942
- Arimitsu Yamagata: 1 March 1941 – 21 December 1944
- Fumio Tsuboshima: 1 September 1941 – 1 April 1945
- Kenichi Ogata: 2 March 1942 – 30 November 1945
- Takeo Seike: 1 December 1942 – 30 November 1945
- Kaizo Yoshihashi: 21 December 1944 – 30 November 1945
- Ryuji Koike: 1 April 1945 – 30 November 1945

=== Naval Aide-de-camp ===
- Reijiro Kawashima: 1 September 1894 – 24 October 1896
- Makoto Saito: 7 September 1894 – 20 February 1895
- Kozo Yoshii: 20 February 1895 – 15 December 1895
- Takashi Saito: 15 December 1895 – 23 May 1898
- Arima Ryōkitsu: 1 November 1896 – 21 December 1899
- Yoshitomo Inoue: 23 May 1898 – 26 May 1908
- Tatsuo Matsumura: 21 December 1899 – 11 July 1903
- Genzaburo Oshiro: 11 July 1903 – 7 February 1907
- Kenkichi Sekino: 24 December 1906 – 1 December 1910
- Shinrokuro Nishi: 26 May 1908 – 1 December 1912
- Kanta Shimauchi: 1 December 1910 – 1 December 1913
- Kenkichi Sekino: 5 August 1912 – 3 October 1912
- Tomoyoshi Usagawa: 5 August 1912 – 3 October 1912
- Kenkichi Sekino: 1 December 1912 – 22 December 1916
- Junichi Matsumura: 1 December 1913 – 15 July 1916
- Sumitaro Maruyama: 8 July 1916 – 12 July 1917
- Yaichi Mukai: 1 December 1916 – 10 February 1923
- Kosuke Shikama: 21 February 1917 – 1 December 1923
- Tojiro Matsushita: 3 August 1918 – 20 December 1924
- Taro Inuzuka: 25 November 1921 – 5 February 1924
- Koshiro Oikawa: 25 November 1921 – 1 December 1922
- Takayoshi Kato: 1 December 1922 – 20 October 1925
- Akira Kuragano: 20 March de 1923 – 1 March 1927
- Nobutake Kondo: 5 February 1924 – 1 December 1926
- Shigezo Oyamada: 1 September 1924 – 5 December 1927
- Shinjiro Imamura: 20 October 1925 – 1 May 1931
- Tokutaro Sumiyama: 1 December 1926 – 1 December 1931
- Toyonaka Yamauchi: 5 December 1927 – 1 June 1932
- Idemitsu Manbei: 1 May 1931 – 5 June 1935
- Eizaburo Kuwaori: 1 December 1931 – 2 December 1935
- Kengo Kobayashi: 1 June 1932 – 25 May 1936
- Noboru Hirata: 5 June 1935 – 15 November 1939
- Yoshikazu Endo: 2 December 1935 – 15 December 1938
- Teijirō Yamazumi: 25 May 1936 – 15 November 1940
- Tadashige Daigo: 15 December 1938 – 20 October 1941
- Tomoshige Samejima: 15 November 1939 – 26 October 1942
- Eiichiro Jo: 15 November 1940 – 20 January 1944
- Jisaburo Sato: 20 October 1941 – 1 February 1945
- Toshihisa Nakamura: 26 October 1942 – 30 November 1945
- Akijiro Imai: 20 January 1944 – 30 November 1945

== See also ==
- Chamberlain of Japan, a similar title without military duties
- Imperial Household Agency
