= Nakamura Satoru (general) =

Baron Nakamura Satoru
- 中村 覚
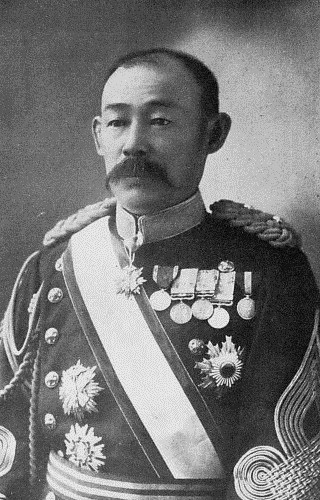

3rd Governor-General of the Kwantung Leased Territory
- In office 15 September 1914 – 31 July 1917
- Monarch: Taishō
- Preceded by: Fukushima Yasumasa
- Succeeded by: Nakamura Yūjirō
Additional positions
Member of the Supreme War Council
In office 31 July 1917 – 20 February 1919
Monarch	Taishō
Senior aide-de-camp to the Emperor
In office 29 December 1908 – 22 August 1913
Monarchs	Meiji; Taishō
Preceded by	Kuwashi Okazawa
Succeeded by	Uchiyama Kojirō
Army aide-de-camp to the Emperor
In office 30 August 1894 – 12 April 1897 Serving with Kuwashi Okazawa, Hirohata Tadatomo, Minato Watanabe
Monarch	Meiji
Preceded by	Position established
Succeeded by	Sasaki Sunao

Personal details
- Born: 18 March 1854 Hikone, Ōmi, Japan
- Died: 29 January 1925 (aged 70) Shinjuku, Tokyo, Japan
- Resting place: Tama Cemetery
- Awards: Order of the Rising Sun, 1st class

Military service
- Allegiance: Empire of Japan
- Branch/service: Imperial Japanese Army
- Years of service: 1871–1919
- Rank: General
- Battles/wars: Satsuma Rebellion; First Sino-Japanese War; Russo-Japanese War; World War I

Baron Nakamura Satoru (中村 覚; 18 March 1854 – 29 January 1925) was a career soldier in the early Imperial Japanese Army, serving during the Russo-Japanese War, and was an aide-de-camp to Emperor Taishō. He is remembered for his association with Hill 203.

== Biography ==
Nakamura was born as the second son of a samurai of Hikone Domain (present-day Shiga Prefecture). Joining the fledgling Imperial Japanese Army in July 1871, he was promoted to corporal in November 1873. After attending the fledgling Imperial Japanese Army Academy, he was commissioned as a second lieutenant in November 1874. He fought as an officer in the IJA 2nd Brigade during the Satsuma Rebellion of 1877. He was assigned to the Imperial Japanese Army General Staff Office from March 1879. After his promotion to major in May 1886, he became a battalion commander with the IJA 10th Infantry Regiment. He became a member of the staff of the IJA 1st Division in May 1888. He served as an instructor at the Army Staff College from December 1889. In April 1891, he served on the staff of the IJA 5th Division.

Nakamura was appointed aide-de-camp to the Crown Prince (the future Emperor Taishō in December 1891, and was promoted to lieutenant colonel in September 1892. During the First Sino-Japanese War, he served as Aide-de-camp to the Emperor of Japan from the end of October 1894 and was promoted to colonel in December of the same year. In April 1897, he was given command of the IJA 46th Infantry Regiment, which served as a garrison force in Taiwan. He was promoted to major general in September 1899. From April 1900, he was chief-of-staff of the military bureau of the Governor-General of Taiwan.

In March 1902, Nakamura was assigned command of the IJA 2nd Brigade, which deployed to Manchuria in March 1904 as part of the Japanese Third Army at the start of the Russo-Japanese War. The unit served with distinction during the Battle of Nanshan. During the Siege of Port Arthur Nakamura led a forlorn hope force named the Shirodasukitai (白襷隊), after the distinctive white tasuki used for visibility and identification in the darkness of a pre-dawn attack. The Shirodasukitai assaulted the Russian fortifications on Hill 203 three times, taking great casualties. Nakamura was himself wounded during the assault on the night of 26 November 1904, during which most of his 4,500 man unit was annihilated with no significant result.

In January 1907, Nakamura became commander of the IJA 15th Division. In September 1907, he was made a baron (danshaku) in the kazoku peerage system. At the end of December 1908, he was once again Aide-de-camp to the Emperor of Japan. In September 1914, he served as governor-general of the Kwantung Leased Territory. In January 1915, he was promoted to full general. During World War I he was appointed to sit the Supreme War Council in 1917. He entered the reserves in February 1919. On his death, he was posthumously awarded the Grand Cordon of the Order of the Rising Sun, Gold Rays.
