= Bunzaburō Kawagishi =

Japanese general (1882-1957)

- 川岸 文三郎
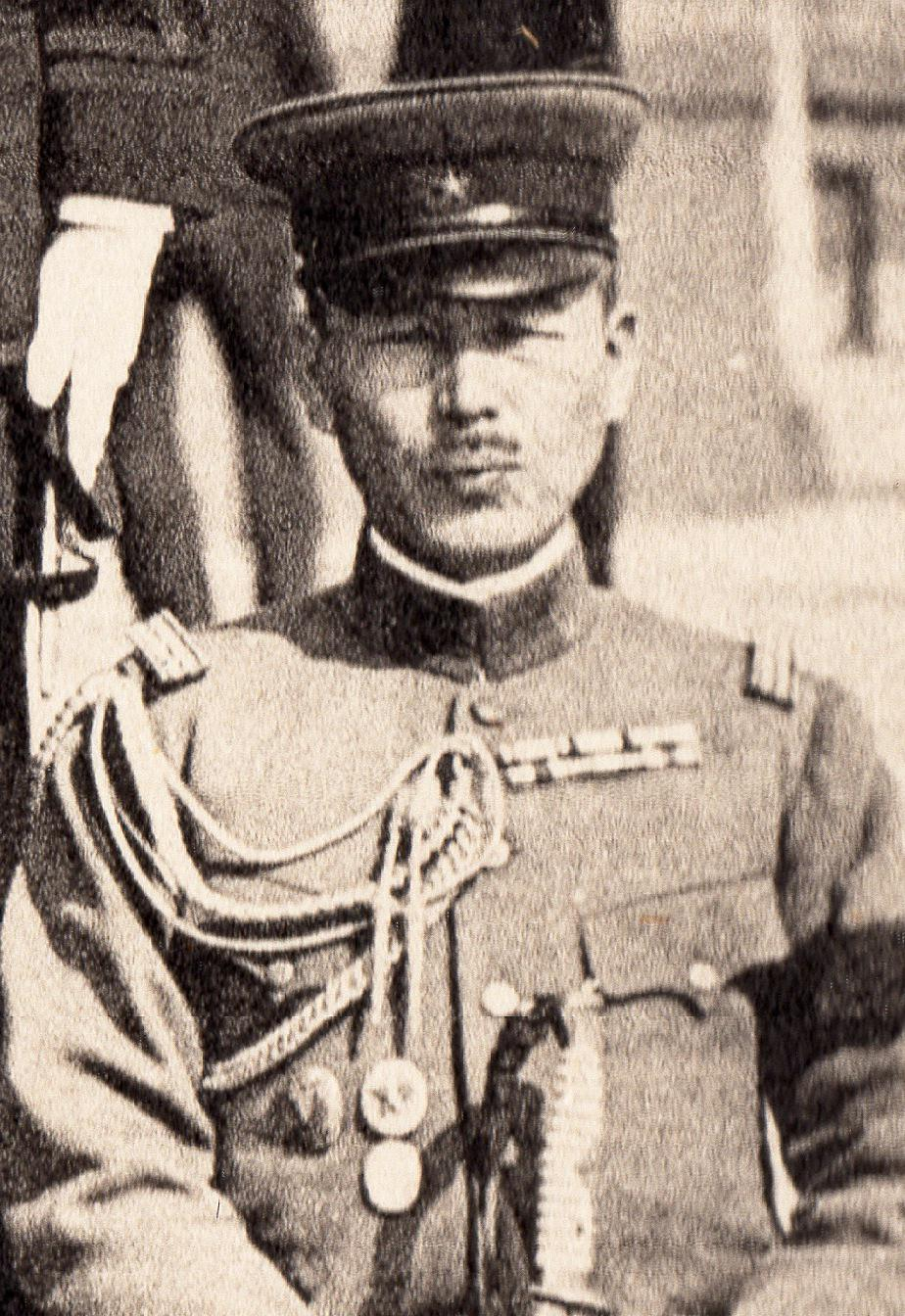
- Born: January 1, 1882; Gunma Prefecture, Japan
- Died: June 16, 1957 (aged 75)
- Military career
- Allegiance: Empire of Japan
- Branch: Imperial Japanese Army
- Service years: 1903–1939
- Rank: Lieutenant General
- Conflicts: Russo-Japanese War; Second Sino-Japanese War

Bunzaburō Kawagishi (川岸 文三郎, Kawagishi Bunzaburō; January 1, 1882 – June 16, 1957) was a lieutenant-general in the Imperial Japanese Army during the early stages of the Second Sino-Japanese War.

== Biography ==
A native of Gunma Prefecture, Kawagishi graduated from the 15th class of the Imperial Japanese Army Academy in 1903. He served as a second lieutenant in the IJA 3rd Infantry Regiment during the Russo-Japanese War of 1904-1905. In November 1911, he graduated from the 23rd class of the Army Staff College. He served on the staff of the Japanese China Garrison Army, the Imperial Japanese Army General Staff, the 2nd Guards Regiment, the Kwantung Army and the IJA 1st Division until February 1924, when he was appointed as Aide-de-camp to the Emperor of Japan. Kawagishi briefly went into the reserves, but was recalled in 1929 to assume command of the 1st Guards Regiment. He was promoted to major general in August 1931 and again became Aide-de-Camp to Emperor Hirohito until 1934. He subsequently served as commander of the IJA 11th Independent Mixed Brigade from 1935 to 1936 and was assigned to command the IJA 20th Division in Korea later in the year.

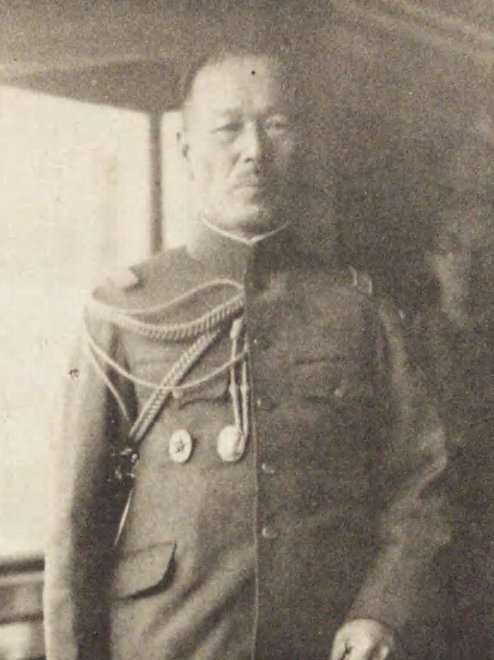
Kawagishi in 1931

After the outbreak of the Marco Polo Bridge Incident Kawagishi moved his division into northern China, participating in the Beiping–Hankou Railway Operation under the North China Area Army. He returned to Japan in 1938 to be the Commander in Chief of the Eastern District Army until 1939 when he retired. His grave is at the Tama Cemetery in Fuchū, Tokyo.
