= Arima Ryōkitsu =

Japanese admiral (1861–1944)

- 有馬 良橘
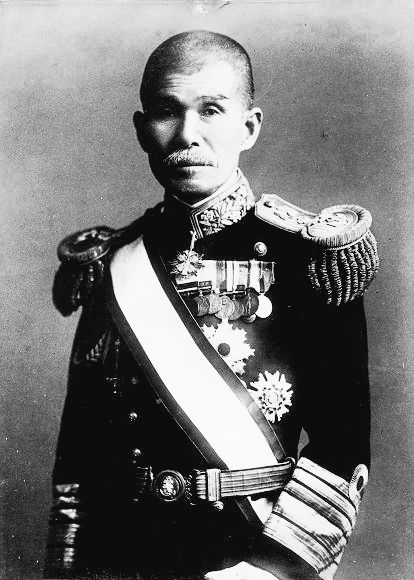
- Born: December 16, 1861; Wakayama, Japan
- Died: May 1, 1944 (aged 82); Tokyo, Japan
- Military career
- Allegiance: Empire of Japan
- Branch: Imperial Japanese Navy
- Service years: 1882–1922
- Rank: Admiral
- Conflicts: Russo-Japanese War
- Awards: Order of the Rising Sun, 1st Class; Order of the Golden Kite

Admiral Arima Ryōkitsu (有馬 良橘; December 16, 1861 – May 1, 1944) was a career naval officer in the Imperial Japanese Navy during Meiji and Taishō periods.

== Biography ==
Arima was a native of Wakayama, where his father was a senior samurai retainer of the Kishū Tokugawa clan, and an active supporter of the Tokugawa shogunate during the Boshin War of the Meiji Restoration. Although he came from such an unfavorable background, Arima was able to secure admission to the 12th class of the Imperial Japanese Naval Academy, after graduating from the forerunners of Doshisha University and Keio University with degrees in English language.

Arima was assigned as a sub-lieutenant to the three-masted corvette Tsukuba in 1885 and graduated 16th out of 19 cadets from the Navy Academy in 1886 after Tsukuba made a long-distance navigational voyage from Japan to Newcastle, Sydney, Wellington, Fiji, Samoa, Honolulu, Apia and Pago Pago lasting most of 1886. On graduation, Arima was assigned to Takachiho, followed by the gunboat Amagi in 1889. His subsequent military service included both sea and staff assignments.

Arima was assigned to Chiyoda in 1890, and accompanied it to the United Kingdom the following year. From 1892 to 1894, he served in staff assignments for the Readiness Fleet. He was sent back to sea on the Naniwa from 1894 to 1895 during the First Sino-Japanese War, and was Chief of Staff of the Yokosuka Naval District from 1895 to 1896. From 1896, he held the prestigious post of Aide-de-camp to Emperor Meiji and was promoted to lieutenant commander in 1897 and to commander in 1899. From March 1900, Arima was assigned as chief navigation officer to the flagship of the Imperial Japanese Navy, the battleship Mikasa, on which he again visited England in 1902. After his return to Japan, he was promoted to the position of executive officer on the cruiser Tokiwa, but at the end of 1903, he was reassigned to the staff of the IJN 1st Fleet.

In 1903, Commander Arima developed a military strategy which considered attrition as an element of overwhelming force in warfare; and this analysis caught the attention of Admiral Tōgō Heihachirō in the period shortly before the outbreak of hostilities in the Russo-Japanese War.

During the Russo-Japanese War, he received his first command, that of the cruiser Otowa. Following his promotion to captain in July 1904, he captained the cruiser Kasagi, during the Battle of the Yellow Sea. During the war, Arima was the senior member of Tōgō's Combined Fleet staff. One of the architects of the plan to blockade the Russian Pacific Fleet in Port Arthur (which he had visited on his return to Japan from England the previous year), Arima was on two of the three missions, and personally commanded the failed Second Port Arthur blockade attempt, during which Commander Takeo Hirose was killed. Soon afterwards, he was reassigned from his field command to become commandant of the Takeshiki Guard District on Tsushima, where he remained for the rest of the war.

After the end of the war, he again received a field command, and from 1906 to 1907, was captain of the cruiser Iwate. He subsequently became Chief of Staff for Fleet Admiral Baron Ijuin Gorō, commander of the IJN 2nd Fleet from 1907 – 1908. From 1908 to 1910 he was Commandant of the Naval Gunnery School at Yokosuka, Kanagawa.

Arima was promoted to rear admiral on December 1, 1909. He served as Chief of First Bureau (Operations) on the Imperial Japanese Navy General Staff from 1910 to 1912 and at the end of 1913 was promoted to vice admiral. From 1914 to 1916, he was Commandant of the Imperial Japanese Naval Academy, continuing to influence its curriculum heavily towards the kantai kessen theory which he had helped create. He also sat on the Board of Inquiry for the Siemens scandal, a political scandal involving naval procurement in 1914. After serving briefly as Director of the Naval Education Command, he became commander-in-chief of the IJN 3rd Fleet from 1917 to 1918. He was promoted to full admiral on November 25, 1919. He then served as Director of Naval Education Command from 1919 to 1920.

== Subsequent career ==
Arima entered the reserve list from April 1, 1922. From September 14, 1931, was named chief priest of the Meiji Shrine. On December 26, 1932, Arima was selected as a member of Emperor Hirohito's Privy Council. In 1934, he was chairman of the committee which organized the state funeral for Fleet Admiral Tōgō Heihachirō. His name was floated as a potential foreign minister in the 1938 administration of Prime Minister Fumimaro Konoe, but he did not serve. However, he maintained close personal ties to Emperor Hirohito and Empress Kojun, serving as a chamberlain from 1939, and resigned from his post as chief priest of Meiji Shrine from 1943.

Arima died of pneumonia at age 84 in 1944 and was posthumously awarded the Grand Cordon of the Order of the Rising Sun. His grave is at the Aoyama Cemetery in Tokyo.

== Honors ==
- Order of the Rising Sun
- Order of the Golden Kite

== Notes ==
Military offices
Preceded by Takeshita Isamu	2nd Fleet; Chief-of-staff; 17 December 1907 – 20 November 1908	Succeeded by Matsumura Tatsuo
Preceded by Murakami Kakuichi	3rd Fleet; Commander-in-chief; 6 April 1917 - 1 December 1918	Succeeded by Kuroi Teijirō
