= Oi Shigemoto =

Japanese politician

Baron Ōi Shigemoto
- 大井 成元
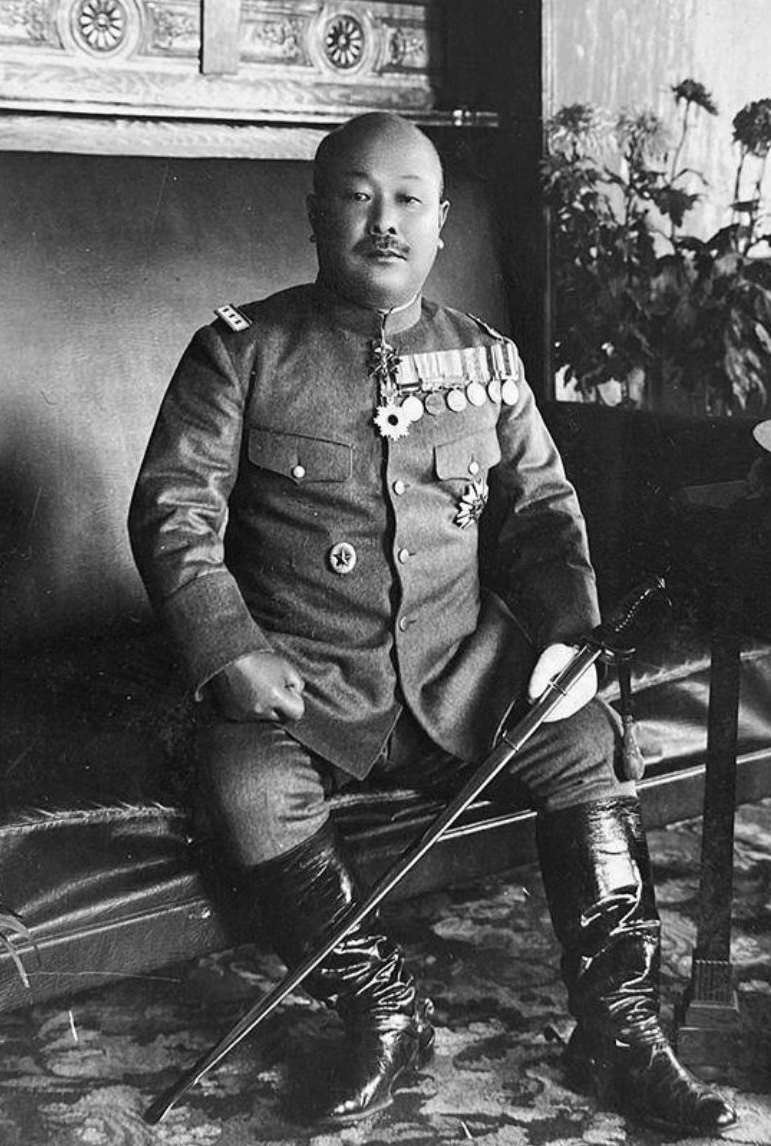
- Born: 22 October 1863; Chōshū Domain, Japan
- Died: 15 July 1951 (aged 87)
- Burial place: Tama Cemetery, Tokyo
- Military career
- Allegiance: Empire of Japan
- Branch: Imperial Japanese Army
- Service years: 1881–1923
- Rank: General
- Commands: IJA 12th Division
- Conflicts: Siberian Intervention

Member of the House of Peers
- In office 15 March 1924 – 13 March 1946 Elected by the Barons

Baron Ōi Shigemoto (大井 成元; 22 October 1863 – 15 July 1951) was a Japanese general who commanded the 12th Division of the Imperial Japanese Army during the Siberian Intervention.

== Biography ==
Ōi was a native of Chōshū Domain (present-day Yamaguchi Prefecture) and entered the Imperial Japanese Army Academy in 1881 and graduated from the Army War College in April 1887. he served in the Imperial Japanese Army General Staff Office from December 1889. In February 1890 he was sent to Germany for studies, and was attached to the Prussian Army's 113th Infantry Regiment. He was promoted to captain in December 1893, and returned to Japan in February 1895, where he was assigned to the staff of the IJA 2nd Army; however from May to December of that year he was assigned as an advisor to the Government-General of Taiwan. He subsequently served as an instructor at the Army Academy and in a number of staff roles, including a diplomatic mission to Germany in May 1902. He was promoted to colonel in March 1905 and major general in January 1909 and was given command of the IJA 19th Infantry Brigade. In March 1911, he became commander of the 2nd Guards Regiment and in November 1912 was commandant of the Army War College.

He was promoted to lieutenant general in May 1914 and was made commander of the IJA 8th Division. In July 1918, he was transferred to the IJA 12th Division, which was dispatched to Siberia the following month. In August 1919, Ōi became the commanding officer of the Vladivostok Expeditionary Force and in November of this same year was promoted to full general. In October 1919, he was awarded with the Grand Cordon of the Order of the Sacred Treasures. Ōi, as commander of the Japanese Trans-Baikal Expeditionary Force, signed a treaty with the Far Eastern Republic in May 1920, which set the stage for the withdrawal of Japanese forces from Siberia. He returned to Japan in July 1920 and a seat on the Supreme War Council. In November 1920, he was awarded with the Grand Cordon of the Order of the Golden Kite and the Grand Cordon of the Order of the Rising Sun.

Ōi was ennobled with the kazoku peerage title of danshaku (baron) in April 1921, and entered the reserves in March 1923. From March 1924, he served as a member of the House of Peers in the Diet of Japan. He retired from the military in April 1933 and from politics in February 1940. Despite this, he was still purged by the American occupation forces after World War II, and returned to his native Yamaguchi Prefecture. He died in July 1951 and his grave is at Tama Cemetery in Tokyo.

== Decorations ==
- 1896 – Order of the Sacred Treasure, 6th class
- 1896 – Order of the Golden Kite, 5th class
- 1914 – Order of the Sacred Treasure, 2nd class
- 1919 – Grand Cordon of the Order of the Sacred Treasure
- 1920 – Grand Cordon of the Order of the Rising Sun
- 1920 – Order of the Golden Kite, 1st class
