= Ijuin Gorō =

Japanese admiral (1852–1921)

Marshal Admiral Baron Ijūin Gorō
- 伊集院 五郎
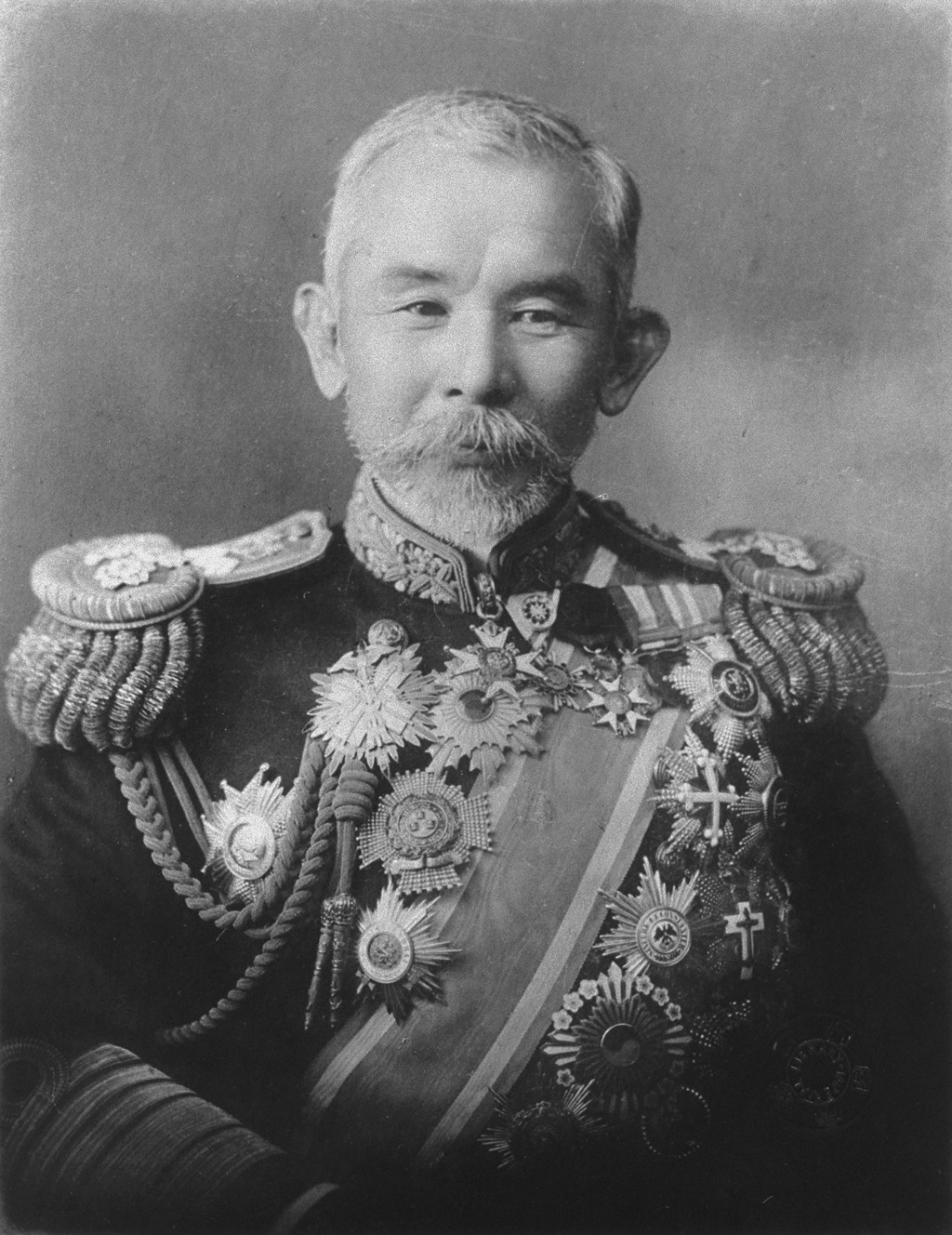
- Born: November 9, 1852; Kagoshima, Satsuma domain, Japan
- Died: January 13, 1921 (aged 68); Tokyo, Japan
- Military career
- Allegiance: Empire of Japan
- Branch: Imperial Japanese Navy
- Service years: 1871–1917
- Rank: Marshal Admiral
- Units: IJN Second Fleet; IJN First Fleet
- Conflicts: Boshin War; Taiwan Expedition of 1874; Satsuma Rebellion; First Sino-Japanese War; Russo-Japanese War
- Awards: Order of the Golden Kite (1st class)

Baron Ijūin Gorō (伊集院 五郎; 9 November 1852 – 13 January 1921) was a Meiji-period career officer in the Imperial Japanese Navy.

== Life and career ==
Born in what is now part of Kagoshima city, as the eldest son of Ijūin Sainojō, a samurai retainer of Satsuma domain, he fought as a Satsuma samurai and foot soldier during major actions in the Boshin War (1868) against the forces loyal to the Tokugawa Shogunate.

After the Meiji Restoration and the establishment of the new Meiji government, Ijūin moved to Tokyo and entered the naval cadet school (the 4th class of the Imperial Japanese Naval Academy) in September 1871, and as cadet served on vessels of the early Imperial Japanese Navy, including the warship Tsukuba from 1876. He participated in the Taiwan Expedition (1874), the Ganghwa Island incident off Korea (1875), and the Satsuma Rebellion (1877).

Sent to England for study in November 1877, selected alongside fellow cadet Fukao Hiroshi for his "academic progress," Ijūin joined the crew of the British battleship HMS Triumph in August 1878, later serving as her navigating officer, before completing courses at Royal Naval College, Greenwich and being commissioned a sub-lieutenant on 27 November 1883. Promoted to lieutenant on 20 June 1885, he returned to work on the Imperial Japanese Navy General Staff (1886–99). He was promoted to lieutenant-commander on 16 October 1890 and received a double promotion to captain on 7 December 1894. During the First Sino-Japanese War he served as a staff officer at the Imperial Japanese Navy headquarters. He became a close confidant of navy chief Admiral Yamamoto Gonnohyoe, and was an important planner and specialist in naval technology.

Promoted to rear admiral on 26 September 1899, Ijūin was a strong proponent of better relations between Japan and the United Kingdom, and worked to develop the Anglo-Japanese Alliance (1902) from behind the scenes. He was on a diplomatic mission to the United Kingdom in 1902 with Major-General Fukushima Yasumasa, and was awarded an honorary Knight Commander of the Order of the Bath (KCB). He was promoted to vice-admiral on 5 September 1903.

As an engineer, Ijūin also developed the "Ijūin Fuse" in 1900, a detonator designed to work in combination with the recently developed Shimose powder. The fuse was extremely sensitive, reportedly capable of detonating a shell on contact with almost anything, including the surface of the sea or rigging lines strung between a ship's masts; combined with Shimose powder it is widely credited as a major factor in the destruction of the Russian Baltic Fleet at Tsushima, and Ijūin himself came to be called "the hidden hero of the Battle of Tsushima" in later Japanese accounts. The fuse's extreme sensitivity was also a liability, however, and premature detonations inside Japanese gun barrels themselves were reported both during the war and afterward.

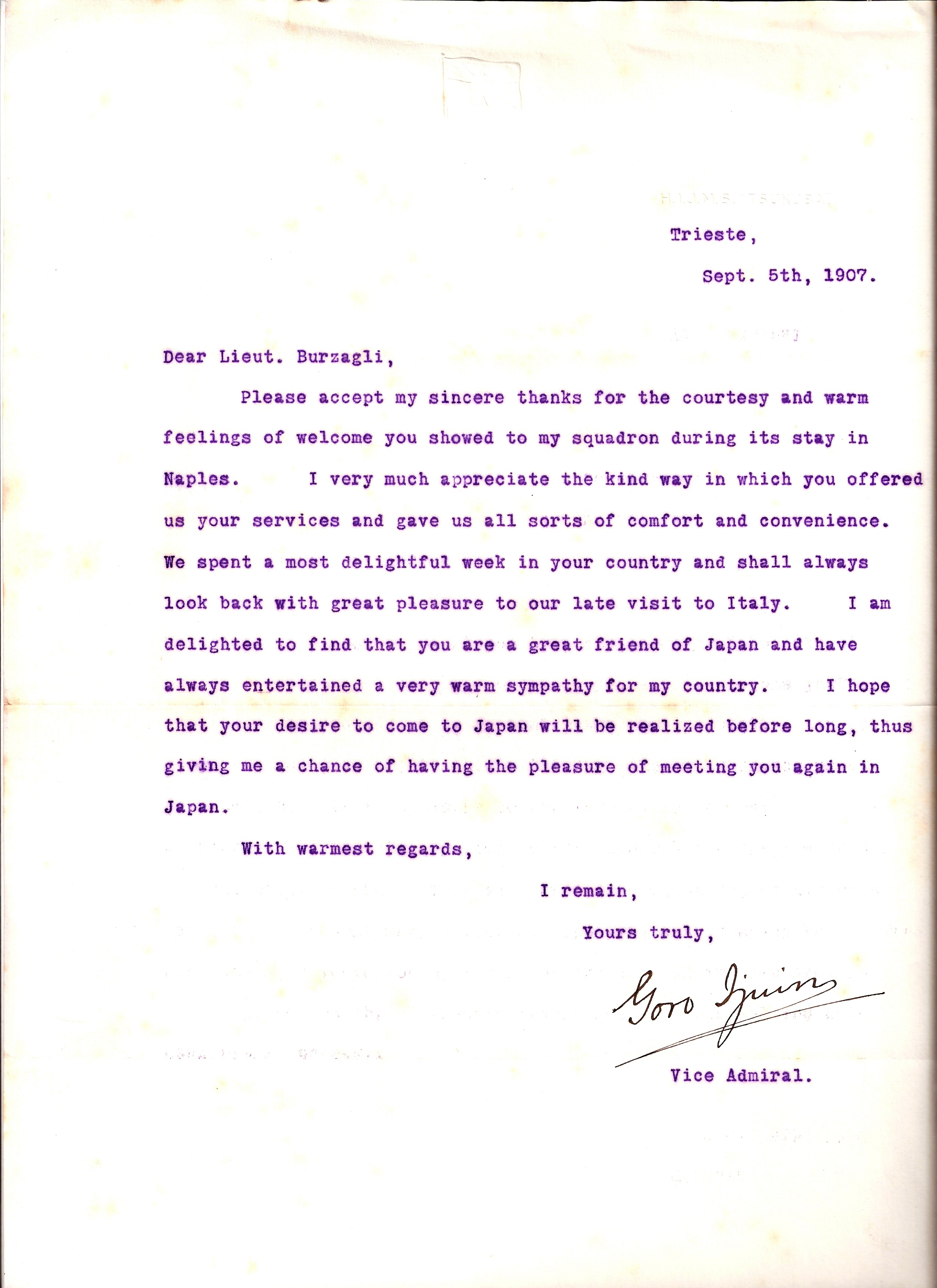
Letter from Vice Admiral Ijūin Gorō to Italian Royal Navy Lieutenant Ernesto Burzagli thanking him for courtesies extended to the Imperial Japanese Navy Second Fleet which visited Italy in 1907.

Ijūin became Vice-Chief of the Navy General Staff during the Russo-Japanese War, ably assisting Chief of Staff Itō Sukeyuki; for his service in this role he was awarded the 1st Class Order of the Golden Kite after the war. He successively assumed the positions of commander-in-chief of the IJN 2nd Fleet, the IJN 1st Fleet, the Combined Fleet, and then became Chief of the Imperial Japanese Navy General Staff (1909–14).

While commander in chief of the Combined Fleet, Ijūin developed a reputation for being fanatical about training, leading to a popular song among sailors that a week in the Japanese navy was "Monday-Monday, Tuesday, Wednesday, Thursday, Friday-Friday" (月月火水木金金, 'Getsu Getsu Ka Sui Moku Kin Kin).

Ijūin was elevated to the title of danshaku (baron) in 1907 under the kazoku peerage system, became an admiral on 1 December 1910 and marshal-admiral on 26 May 1917, despite never having actually commanded a ship.

His grave is at Aoyama Cemetery in Tokyo. His son, the Admiral Ijūin Matsuji, also a career navy officer, took command of the 1st Escort Convoy Group in 1944 and died that same year. His second son, Ijūin Takeji, was adopted into the Ōno family and took the name Ōno Takeji. (Note: Some sources additionally describe him as a captain of the battleship Yamato; this is not confirmed here and is omitted pending a reliable source.)

== Notes ==
Military offices
| Preceded by Dewa Shigetō | 2nd Fleet; Commander-in-chief; 22 November 1906 – 26 May 1908 | Succeeded by Dewa Shigetō |
| Preceded by Arima Shinichi | 1st Fleet; Commander-in-chief; 26 May 1908 – 1 December 1909 | Succeeded by Kamimura Hikonojō |
| Fleet recreated, last held by Tōgō Heihachirō | Combined Fleet; Commander-in-chief; 8 October 1908 - 20 November 1908 | Fleet dissolved, next held by Yoshimatsu Motarō |
| Preceded by Tōgō Heihachirō | Navy General Staff; Chairman; 1 December 1909 – 1 December 1914 | Succeeded by Shimamura Hayao |
