= Takeji Nara =

Baron Takeji Nara
- 奈良 武次
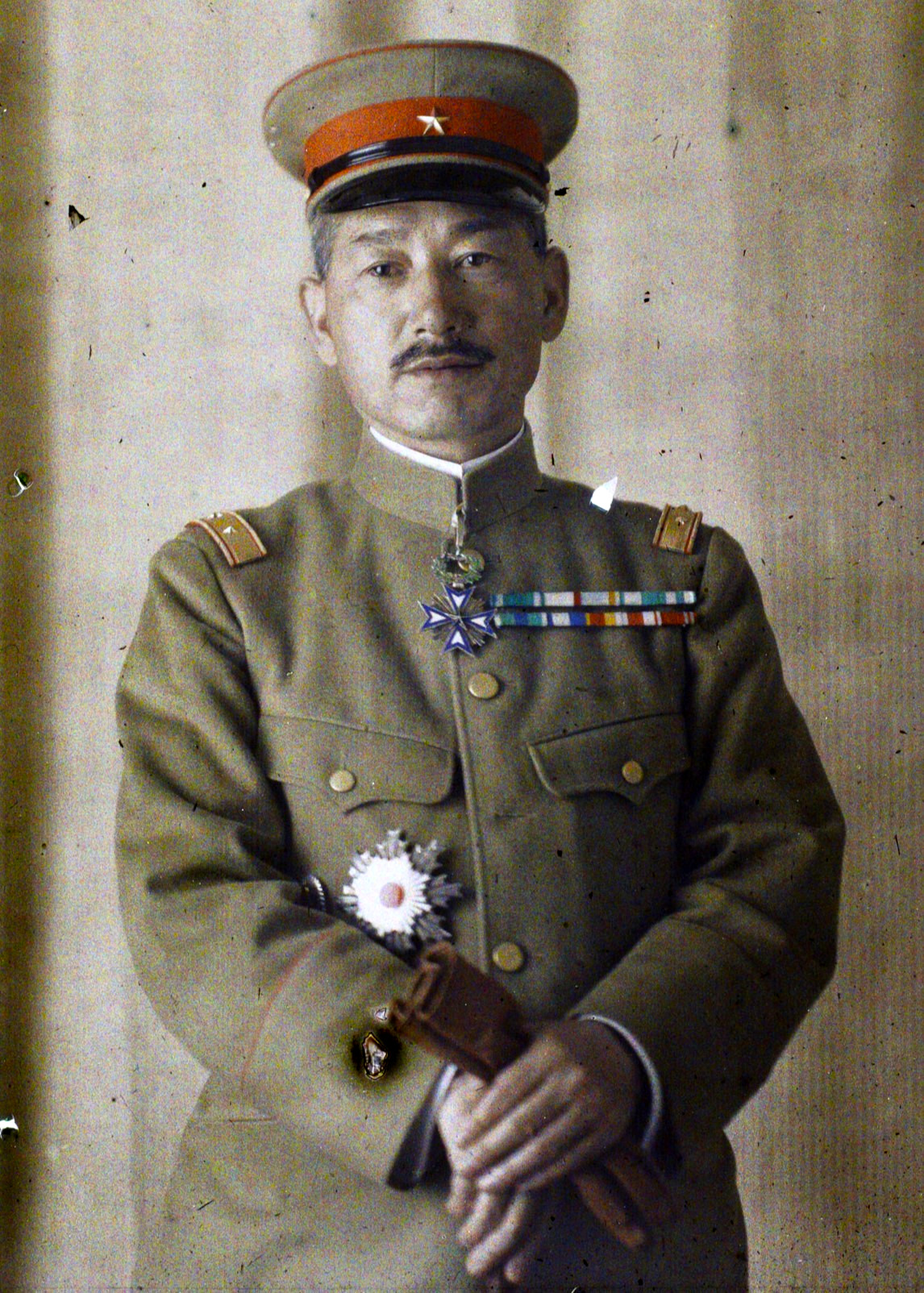
- 1919 autochrome by Georges Chevalier
- Born: April 28, 1868; Kanuma, Tochigi, Japan
- Died: December 21, 1962 (aged 94)
- Military career
- Allegiance: Empire of Japan
- Branch: Imperial Japanese Army
- Service years: 1889–1933
- Rank: General
- Commands: China Garrison Army
- Conflicts: First Sino-Japanese War; Russo-Japanese War
- Other work: Aide-de-camp to the Emperor of Japan

Baron Takeji Nara (奈良 武次, Nara Takeji; April 28, 1868 – December 21, 1962) was a general in the Imperial Japanese Army.

== Biography ==
Nara was born in what is now part of Kanuma city, Tochigi Prefecture to a farming family. He attended military preparatory schools as a youth, and graduated from the 11th class of the Imperial Japanese Army Academy in 1889 as a second lieutenant in the artillery. In 1893, he attended the Army Artillery School, and the participated in the First Sino-Japanese War from 1894-1895.

After the war, he returned to the Army Staff College, graduating from the 13th class in December 1899. He subsequently served in a number of staff positions within the Imperial Japanese Army General Staff, and was sent to Germany as a military attaché.

During the Russo-Japanese War, Nara was commander of an Independent Heavy Artillery Brigade which operated the siege artillery units attached to the IJA 3rd Army. After the war and another visit to Germany, he rose to be Vice Minister of War. Promoted to major general in 1914, he served as commander of the Japanese China Garrison Army, and later as chief of staff of Japanese forces in Qingdao.

Nara was promoted to lieutenant general in 1918, and attended the Versailles Peace Treaty Conference as part of the Japanese delegation. He also chaired the commission investigating the Nikolayevsk Incident.

Nara subsequently served as Chief aide-de-camp to Crown Prince Hirohito, and then as Chief Aide-de-camp to the Emperor of Japan after Hirohito's coronation, until 1933. At the request of the genrō Yamagata Aritomo, Nara supervised the Crown prince's education in military affairs through both lectures and active experience. Under his direction, Hirohito mastered horsemanship, and practiced firing live weapons, even to the extent of having a firing range built within the Akasaka Palace. In 1921, he was part of the entourage which accompanied Hirohito on his official visit to Europe.

He was promoted to full general in 1924 and became a member of the Privy Council. In 1933, he was elevated to the title of baron (danshaku) under the kazoku peerage system, retiring from his military career soon afterwards.

In the post war period, he served as Chairman of the Dai Nippon Butoku Kai. Nara died in 1962 and his diaries from the period that he was aide-de-camp to Emperor Hirohito shed additional light on the thoughts and role of the Emperor during World War II.

== Notes ==
Most of the information in this article was translated from the Japanese Wikipedia site.
