= Fukushima Yasumasa =

Japanese general (1852–1919)

Baron Fukushima Yasumasa
- 福島 安正
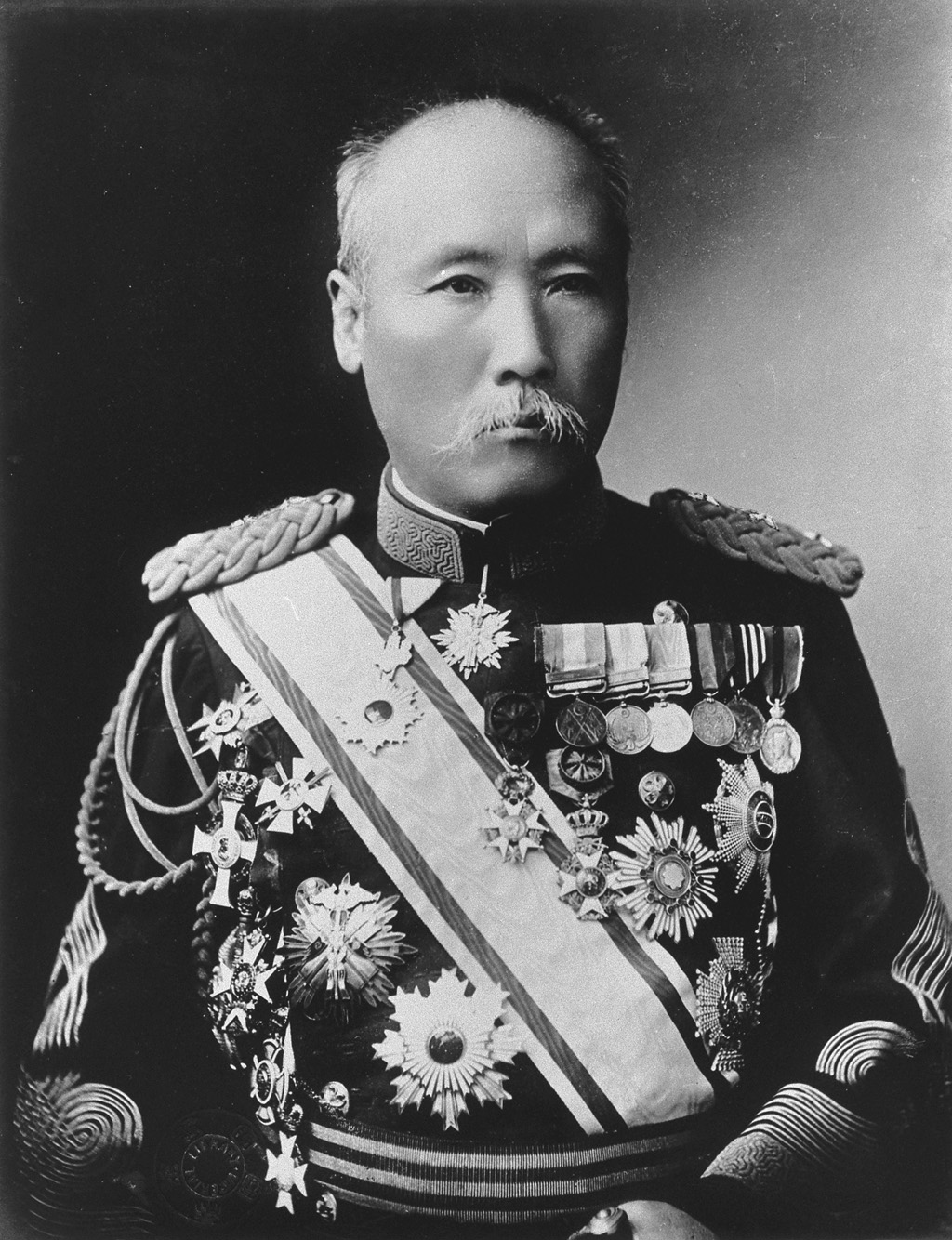

2nd Governor-General of the Kwantung Leased Territory
- In office 26 April 1912 – 15 September 1914
- Monarchs: Meiji; Taishō
- Preceded by: Ōshima Yoshimasa
- Succeeded by: Nakamura Satoru

Personal details
- Born: 27 May 1852 Matsumoto, Shinano, Japan
- Died: 19 February 1919 (aged 66) Zōshigaya, Tokyo, Japan
- Resting place: Aoyama Cemetery
- Awards: Knight-Commander of the Order of the Bath

Military service
- Allegiance: Empire of Japan
- Branch/service: Imperial Japanese Army
- Years of service: 1874–1914
- Rank: General
- Battles/wars: Satsuma Rebellion; First Sino-Japanese War; Boxer Rebellion; Russo-Japanese War

Baron Fukushima Yasumasa (福島 安正, Yasumasa Fukushima; 27 May 1852 – 19 February 1919) was a general in the Imperial Japanese Army.

== Life as a Samurai ==
Fukushima was born to a samurai family; his father was a retainer to the daimyō of Matsumoto, in Shinano Province (modern Nagano Prefecture). He also became a retainer of Lord Toda Mitsunori. In 1867 he traveled to Edo (later Tokyo) to attend the Kobusho military school for hatamoto located in Tsukiji. During the Boshin War (1868–1869), he saw service as a member of the Matsumoto contingent. In 1869, with Lord Toda, he again traveled to Tokyo and studied foreign languages at the Kaisei Gakko, a school specializing in foreign studies. After graduating the school in 1874, he joined the Ministry of Justice as a civilian personnel and later moved to the Ministry of War. He participated in the government forces in the Satsuma Rebellion (1877). His quick mind and ability to get along well with people earned him a posting at the Imperial Japanese Army General Staff at an early age.

== Early foreign travels ==
During the next years, he traveled extensively, visiting Mongolia in 1879, serving as military attaché to Beijing from 1882–1884. He was a staff officer of the Japanese First Army when the First Sino-Japanese War broke out.

After the war, Fukushima visited British India and Burma on an extensive tour from 1886–1887. In 1887, he was promoted to major, and sent as military attaché to Berlin. On this trip in 1892, he was accompanied by Prince Saionji Kinmochi. Fukushima, who spoke 10 languages fluently, was a popular figure in German society during his stay in Berlin. Fukushima made a reputation during his stay in Berlin, for winning all manner of wagers involving feats of arms or physical strength. He later claimed that the reason for his long ride across Russia was a wager made over drinks against some German cavalry majors. (The story is probably an invention, as some historians claim that Fukushima never drank alcohol, and in any case it is not recorded whether or not Fukushima ever collected on the wager). In any case, Fukushima was an admirer of Colonel Burnaby, a British cavalry officer, who had made an epic ride to Khiva in 1874 after receiving word that the Russians had closed the border to Turkistan. Fukushima also shared Burnaby's political views that Russia was the chief enemy of both Great Britain and Japan.

== Epic horseback ride ==
For his return to Japan, he chose to make an epic crossing of two continents on horseback, from Berlin to Vladivostok. The trip took one year and four months, and had as one of its objectives, inspecting the construction of the still under construction Trans-Siberian Railway as well as gathering intelligence of the local infrastructure, command and control, along the way. During this journey, on 1 March 1893 prior to entering Manchuria, he was promoted to lieutenant colonel. The story of his 14,000 kilometer ride made him a Japanese national hero, and earned him the Order of the Sacred Treasures, third class. After his return to Japan from his ride across Asia, Fukushima donated his horses to Ueno Zoo in Tokyo, where they quickly became famous tourist attractions.

== Service during the Boxer Rebellion ==
Fukushima subsequently saw service in the Boxer Rebellion (1900), where he was in command of Japanese forces in Tianjin, as well as the Foreign Legation. Afterwards, he returned briefly to the Imperial Japanese Army Academy to study under the German General Jakob Meckel.

== Further travels and foreign honors ==
As a General Staff officer after the war, he visited Egypt, Ottoman Turkey, Persia, Arabia, India, Burma, Siam and Turkistan. In 1902, he represented Emperor Meiji at the coronation of King Edward VII of Great Britain, and participated in secret diplomatic negotiations behind the Anglo-Japanese Alliance. He was awarded an honorary Knight-Commander of the Order of the Bath (KCB) and Order of Prince Danilo I.

During the Russo-Japanese War (1904–1905) Fukushima traveled through Saskatchewan, Canada on the way to New York for the purpose of negotiating financial assistance for the war. He stopped his special train just east of Regina, Saskatchewan to view the prairies. The siding where he stopped was named Fukushima in his honour.

== Honors in Japan ==
Fukushima also served with distinction in the First Sino-Japanese War (1894–1895), and in the Russo-Japanese War (1904–1905).

In 1907, Fukushima was elevated to the title of danshaku (baron) under the kazoku peerage system. From 26 April 1912 to 15 September 1914, he served as the Governor-General of Kwantung Leased Territory. In 1914, he was promoted to general and was transferred to the second reserve. After the transfer, he served as vice-president of the Association of Reservists.

== Poetry and death ==
Fukushima was on good terms with fellow poet General Akashi Motojiro, and although not close friends, the two men shared ideas on the long term needs of the Japanese secret services in the Asian area. Fukushima even composed a poem titled "From Fallen Petal to Rising Star", in which he honored a prostitute who became a patriot through her intelligence-gathering activities.

Fukushima died at age 66 and his grave is located at Aoyama Cemetery, Tokyo. The Matsumoto City Museum in Matsumoto, Nagano, preserves some of his personal artifacts, including his riding crop.

Government offices
Preceded by Ōshima Yoshimasa	Governor-General of Kwantung Leased Territory; 1912–1914	Succeeded by Nakamura Satoru
