= Uchiyama Kojirō =

Japanese general

Baron Uchiyama Kojirō
- 内山 小二郎
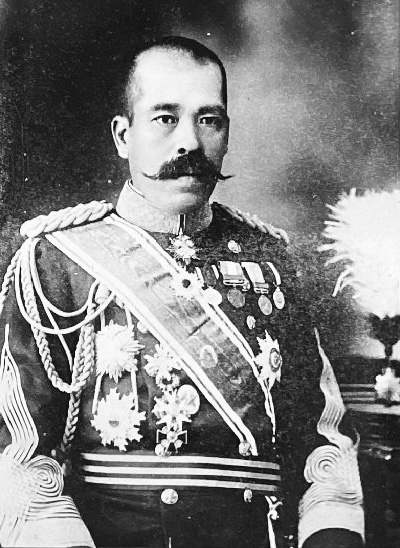
- Born: 14 November 1859; Edo, Japan
- Died: 14 February 1945 (aged 85)
- Education: Imperial Japanese Army Academy; Army Staff College
- Military career
- Allegiance: Empire of Japan
- Branch: Imperial Japanese Army
- Service years: 1879 – 1923
- Rank: General
- Units: IJA 6th Division; IJA 1st Division; IJA 5th Army
- Commands: IJA 15th Field Artillery Regiment; IJA 1st Field Artillery Brigade; Yura Fortress; Tokyo Bay Fortress; IJA 15th Infantry Division; IJA 12th Infantry Division
- Conflicts: First Sino-Japanese War; Russo-Japanese War
- Awards: § Decorations
- Other work: Military attaché to Russia and France; Aide-de-camp to the Emperor of Japan

Baron Uchiyama Kojirō (内山 小二郎; 14 November 1859 – 14 February 1945) was a general in the early Imperial Japanese Army.

== Biography ==
Uchiyama was born in Edo as the second son to a samurai family in the service of Tottori Domain. He entered the Imperial Japanese Army Academy in May 1877. He was commissioned as a second lieutenant in the artillery of the fledgling Imperial Japanese Army in December 1879. In 1886, he graduated from the Army Staff College and was promoted to captain. In 1888, he became commandant of the Imperial Japanese Army Academy and in 1890 served on the staff of the IJA 6th Division. In September 1893 he was promoted to major, and the following year was assigned to the staff of the IJA 1st Division.

During the First Sino-Japanese War he was with the IJA 1st Division, and was promoted to lieutenant colonel of artillery in 1894. He became chief-of-staff of the IJA 1st Division in February 1895; however, he returned to Japan in May and was sent as a military attaché to Russia in December of the same year. He was appointed to colonel and assigned as a military attaché to France in October 1897. In January 1901, Uchiyama became commander of the IJA 15th Field Artillery Regiment, and was promoted to major general in June of the same year.

During the Russo-Japanese War Uchiyama commanded the IJA 1st Field Artillery Brigade, and from February 1905 was a staff officer with the IJA 5th Army. After the end of the war, he returned to Russia once again as a military attaché. In 1907, he was promoted to lieutenant general and commandant of Yura Fortress and from 1908 was commandant of Tokyo Bay Fortress. He subsequently commanded the IJA 15th Infantry Division in 1909 and the IJA 12th Infantry Division in 1912.

From 1913, he became an Aide-de-camp to the Emperor of Japan and was promoted to general in 1915. In November 1921, Uchiyama was ennobled with the title of baron (danshaku) under the kazoku peerage system. He entered the reserves in 1923 and was promoted to the honorific title of Junior Second Court Rank He retired in 1929 and died in 1945.

== Decorations ==
- 1893 - Order of the Sacred Treasure, 6th class
- 1895 - Order of the Rising Sun, 6th class
- 1895 - Order of the Golden Kite, 4th class
- 1896 - Order of the Sacred Treasure, 5th class
- 1904 - Order of the Sacred Treasure, 3rd class
- 1906 - Order of the Golden Kite, 2nd class
- 1906 - Order of the Rising Sun, 2nd class
- 1914 - Grand Cordon of the Order of the Sacred Treasure
- 1915 - Grand Cordon of the Order of the Rising Sun
- 1945 - Grand Cordon of the Order of the Rising Sun with Paulownia

=== Foreign decorations ===
- 1902 - France, Legion of Honour, Commandeur
- 1908 - Russia Order of St. Stanislaus 1st degree
- 1916 - Order of the White Eagle
