= Inoue Hikaru =

General in the imperial Japanese army

Baron Inoue Hikaru
- 井上光
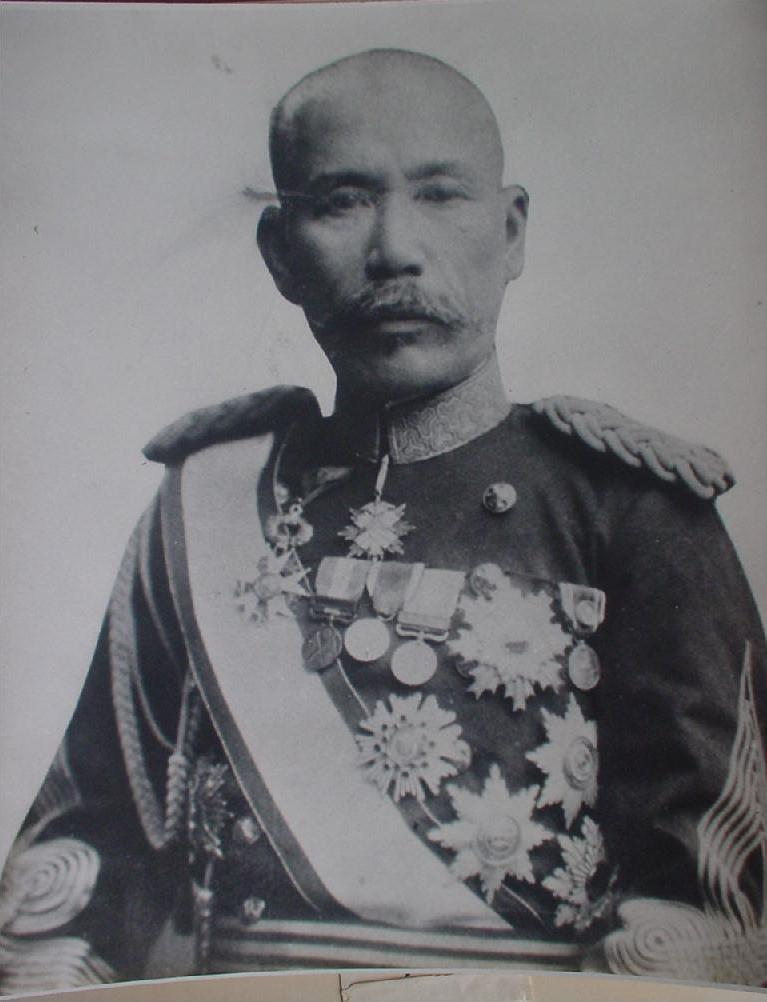
- Born: November 30, 1851; Iwakuni, Yamaguchi, Japan
- Died: December 7, 1908 (aged 57)
- Military career
- Allegiance: Empire of Japan
- Branch: Imperial Japanese Army
- Service years: 1871–1908
- Rank: General
- Conflicts: Boshin War; Satsuma Rebellion; First Sino-Japanese War; Russo-Japanese War

Baron Inoue Hikaru (井上光; 8 November 1851 – 17 December 1908) was a general in the Imperial Japanese Army during the First Sino-Japanese War and Russo-Japanese War.

== Biography ==
Inoue was born as a younger son to the Moriwaki family in Iwakuni Domain (present day Yamaguchi prefecture), and was later adopted into the Inoue clan. As a young samurai, he joined the clan’s Seigitai militia and fought in the Boshin War during the Meiji Restoration against the Tokugawa shogunate.

He joined the fledgling Imperial Japanese Army in May 1871, serving as a battalion commander, and from September 1874 on the staff of the Imperial Guards. After graduating from the predecessor of the Imperial Japanese Army Academy in September 1875, he was assigned to the Hiroshima Garrison’s 12th Infantry Regiment as a battalion commander and was promoted to major in July 1876. In 1877, Inoue fought in the Satsuma Rebellion and was subsequently served on the staff of the Kumamoto Garrison, Nagoya Garrison and was promoted to lieutenant colonel and commander of the IJA 1st Infantry Regiment in May 1885. In November 1888 he was promoted to colonel. From September 1889, Inoue served as Chief of Staff of the IJA 3rd Division. From February 1894 he was sent for six months to Europe, returning in October 1894 to assume the post of chief-of-staff of the Japanese Second Army during the First Sino-Japanese War. After his promotion to major general in May 1895, Inoue was given command of the. He subsequent was commander of the IJA 3rd Division in 1898 and promoted to lieutenant general in March 1899 and commander of the newly formed IJA 12th Division. In November 1903, he was awarded the Order of the Sacred Treasure, 1st class.

Inoue continued to command the IJA 12th Division from the start of the Russo-Japanese War, participating in almost every major combat from the Battle of the Yalu through the final Battle of Mukden. After the end of the war, in July 1906, he was transferred to command the IJA 4th Division and was awarded the Grand Cordon of the Order of the Rising Sun and the Order of the Golden Kite, 2nd class. He was also elevated to the kazoku peerage with the title of baron (danshaku) in September 1907. In August 1908, he was promoted to general. On his death in December of the same year, he was posthumously awarded the Grand Cordon of the Order of the Rising Sun, Gold Rays with Neck Ribbon.
