= Yura Fortress =

Group of coastal fortifications at the entrance to Osaka Bay, Japan

- Osaka Bay, Japan
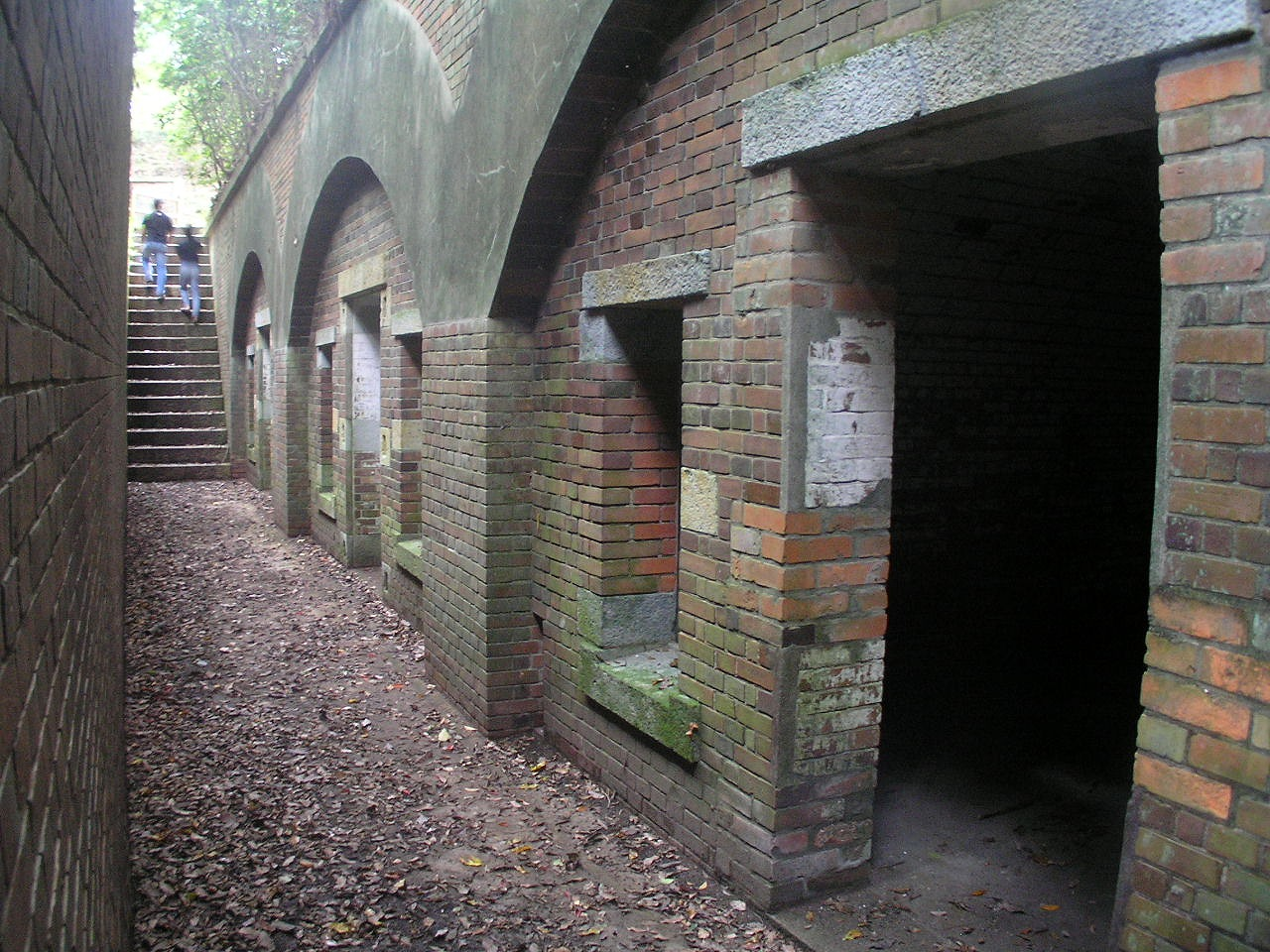
- ruins of Kada Battery

Site information
- Type: Defensive fortification
- Controlled by: Empire of Japan
- Condition: ruins

Site history
- Built: 1884–1945
- Materials: Concrete; Wood; Steel
- Demolished: 1946
- Battles/wars: World War II

Garrison information
- Occupants: Imperial Japanese Army

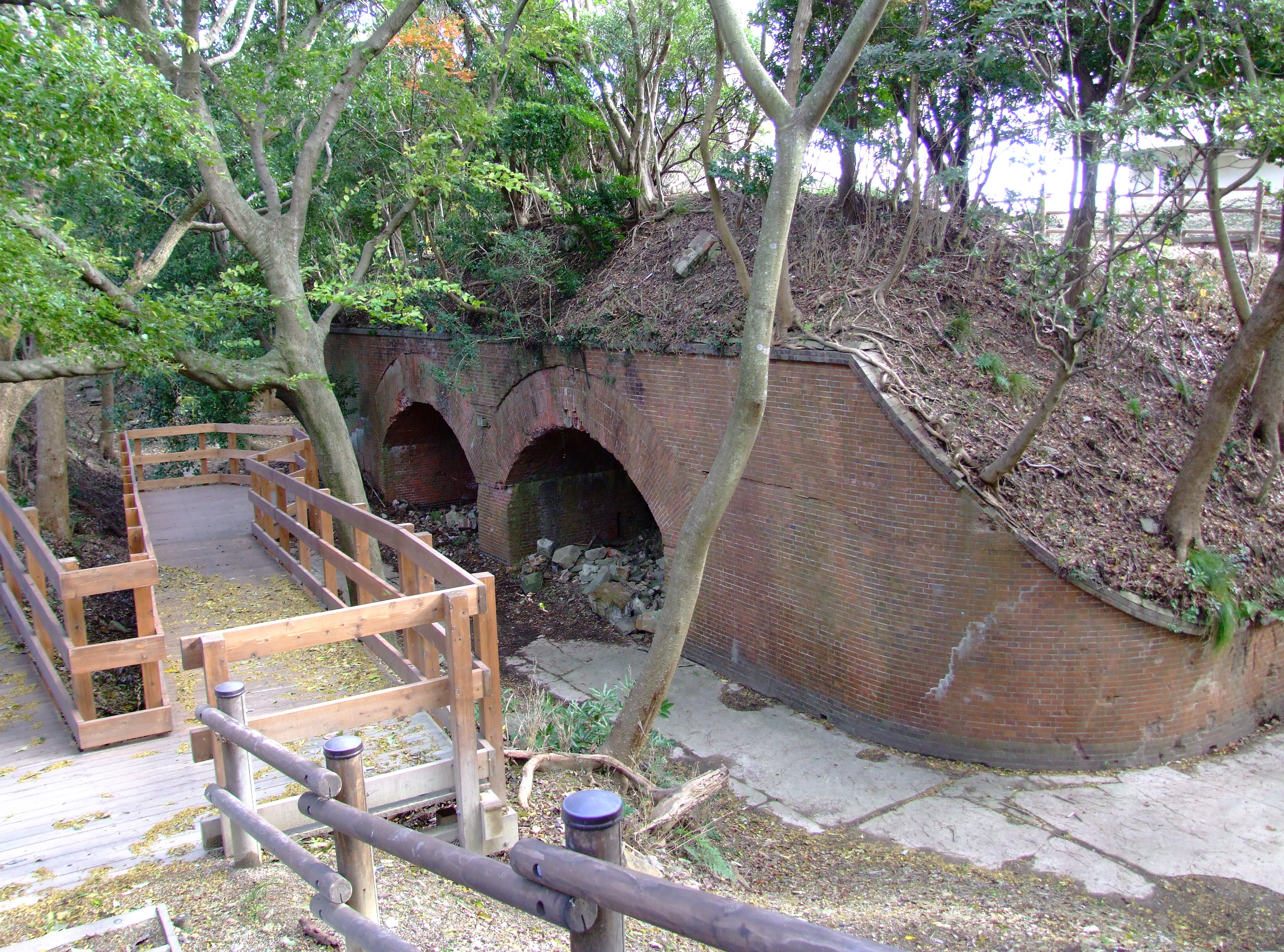
ruins of Oishi Battery No.1

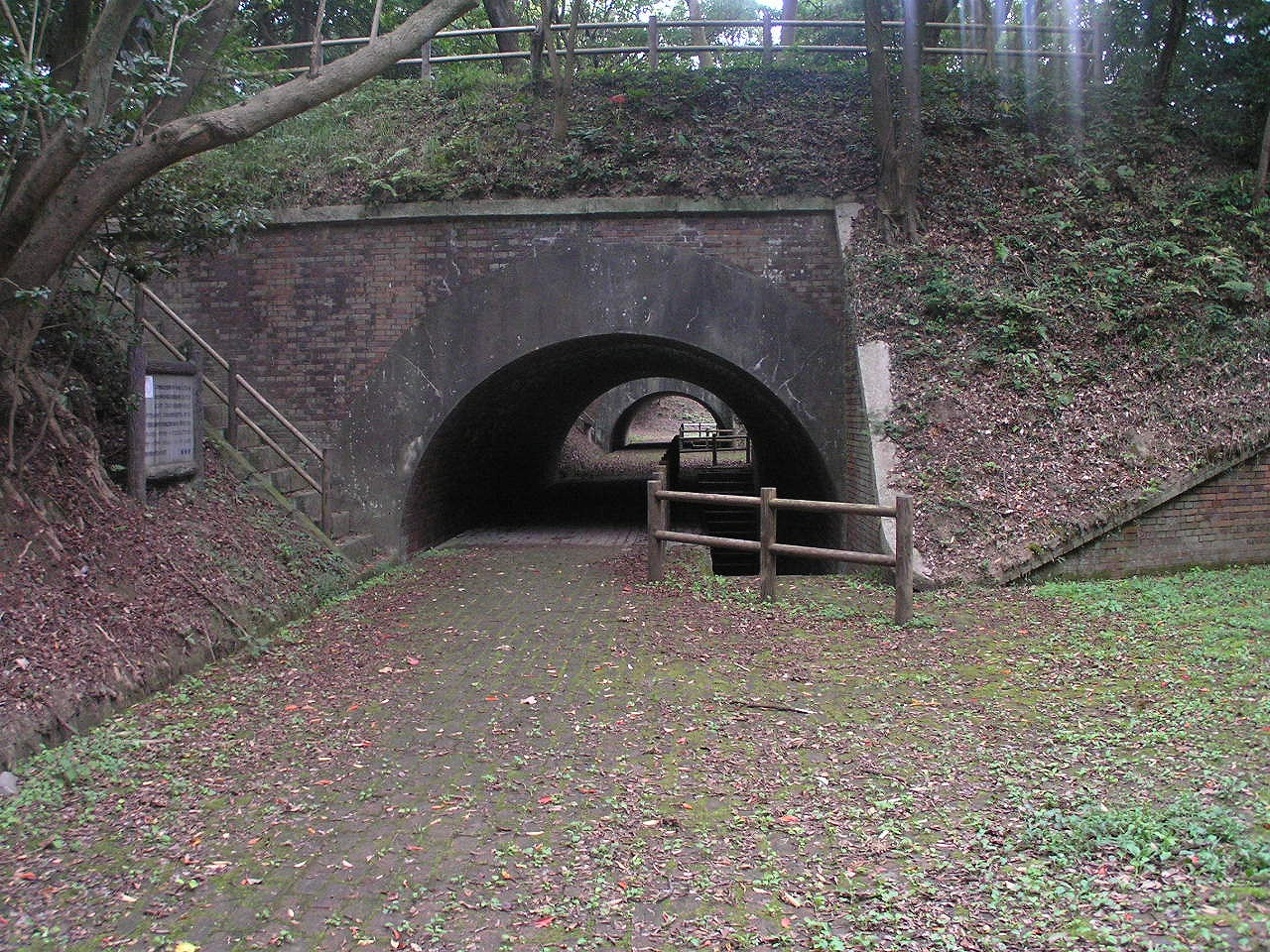
ruins of Miyama Battery

Yura Fortress (由良要塞, Yura yōsai) was the name of a group of coastal fortifications built to guard the entrance to Osaka Bay and thus the city of Osaka from attack from the sea. These gun batteries and fortifications ceased to be used after the end of World War II.

== History ==
After the Meiji restoration, the primary threats to the new Empire of Japan were perceived to be Qing China's Beiyang fleet, followed by the Russian Empire's Pacific Fleet. The Meiji government ordered the construction of a set of coastal fortifications to protect the western entrance to the Seto Inland Sea and the cities of Osaka, Kobe and Kyoto starting in 1889. The main facilities were constructed in three groups to block the Kitan Strait, one group on Awaji Island, one group on Tomogashima in the middle of the strait, and one ground around Miyama on the western shore of Kii Peninsula in Wakayama city. A fourth group, the Naruto Fortress, was added to the Yura Fortress in May 1903. This fortification covered the Naruto Strait between Shikoku and the western side of Awaji Island.

The largest guns installed were 28-cm howitzers of the same type which were used during the Russo-Japanese War at the Siege of Port Arthur to get effect against the Russian Pacific Fleet. From the 1920s and 1930s, many surplus guns of the Imperial Japanese Navy, which had been made available due to the reduction of capital warships per the London Naval Treaty and the Washington Naval Treaty, were reused in these coastal artillery installations.

The Yura Garrison Command was headquartered at Yura, in what is now part of the city of Sumoto, Hyōgo on the island of Awaji. In the final stages of World War II, the Yura Fortress came under the command of the Japanese Fifteenth Area Army under the Second General Army.

All gun batteries were dismantled at the end of World War II, but some fortifications remain in semi-ruinous state. Tomogashima, especially, has been a popular hiking and camping site with relatively easy access.

Yura Fortress features in the popular TV documentary series Abandoned Engineering(Series 12 Episode 7)

== Components of the Yura Fortress ==
=== Yura Site ===
- Oishi No.1 Battery: 28cm howitzer (6 guns)
- Oishi No.2 Battery: 28cm howitzer (6 guns)
- Oishi No.3 Battery: 24cm cannon (8 guns)
- Oishi No.4 Battery: 27cm canon (4 guns)
- Oishi No.5 Battery: 12cm cannon (4 guns)
- Naruyama No.1 Battery: 15cm cannon (2 guns), 21cm cannon (6 guns)
- Naruyama No.2 Battery: 12cm cannon (2 guns), 28cm howitzer (2 guns)
- Takasaki Battery: 24cm cannon (8 guns)
- Akamatsu Mountain Fort: 9cm cannon (6 guns)
- Ibari Sanbaru: 9cm cannon (4 guns)
- Oishi Bastion: 15cm mortar (4 guns)

=== Tomogashima ===
- Tomogashima 1st Battery: 27cm cannon (4 guns)
- Tomogashima 2nd Battery: 27cm cannon (4 guns)
- Tomogashima 3rd Battery: 28cm howitzer (8 guns)
- Tomogashima 4th Battery: 28cm howitzer (6 guns)
- Tomogashima 5th Battery: 12cm cannon (6 guns)
- Torashima Base: 9cm cannon (4 guns)

=== Miyama site ===
- Miyama 1st Battery: 28cm howitzer (6 guns)
- Miyama 2nd Battery: 28cm howitzer (6 guns)
- Miyama 3nd Battery: 12cm Cannon (4 guns)
- Kada Battery: 27cm cannon (4 guns)
- Takurazaki Battery: 28cm howitzer (6 guns)
- Okawa Base: Arsenal
- Takamoriyama Base: unknown
- Nishinosho Bsse: unknown

=== Naruto site ===
- Kadozaki Battery
- Sasayama Battery
- Gyojagatake Battery
- Kakigahara Magazine and Battery

== See also ==
- Central District Army (Japan)
- Second General Army (Japan)
