= Tomogashima =

Island group in Wakayama, Japan

Coordinates: 34°16′55.9″N 135°0′39.5″E

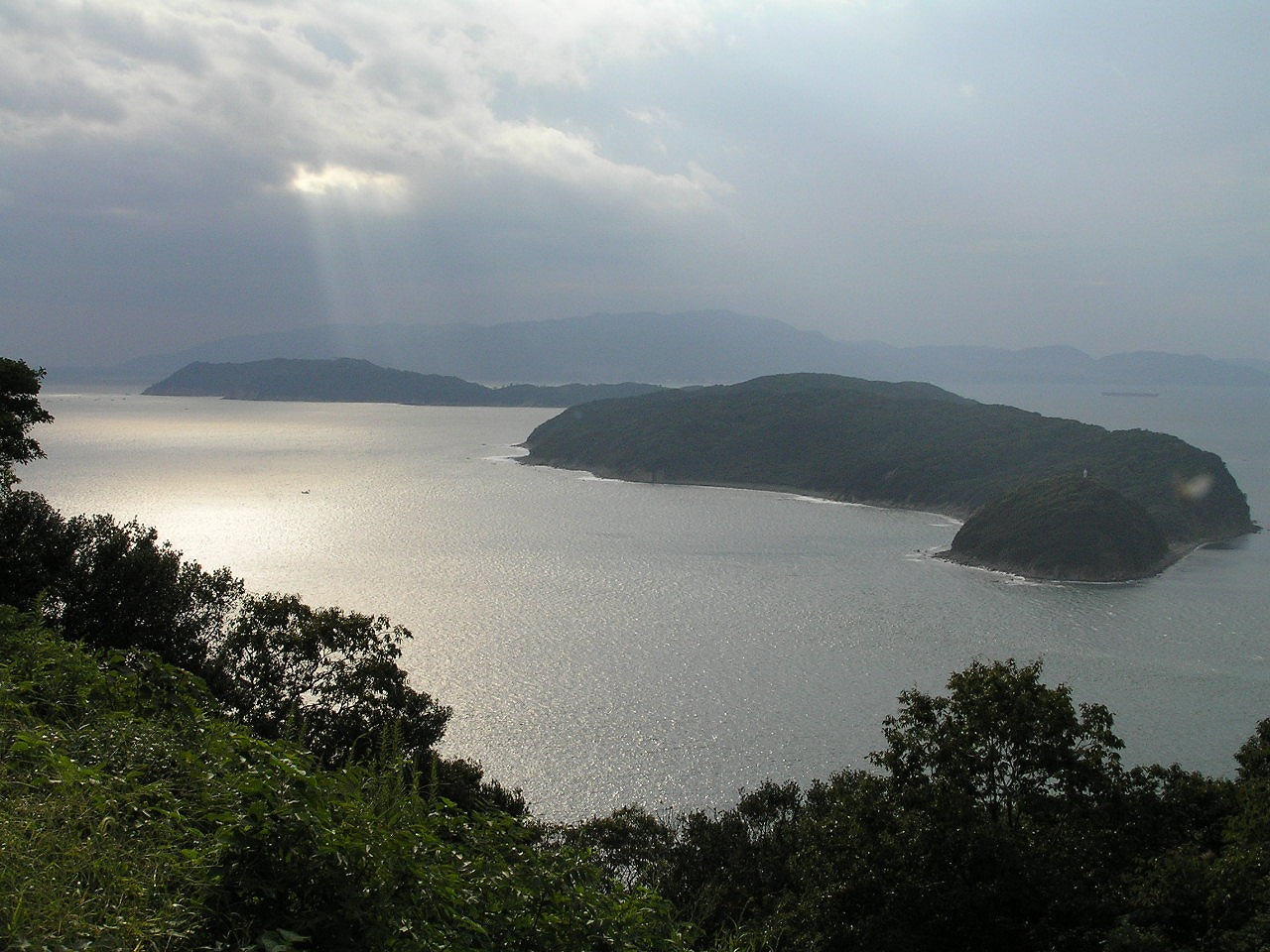
Jinoshima, Okinoshima, and Awaji Island

Views of Tomogashima (1798)

Tomogashima (友ヶ島) is a cluster of four islands in the Inland Sea, off Wakayama, Wakayama, Japan. The four islands are Jinoshima (地ノ島), Kamishima (神島), Okinoshima (沖ノ島), and Torajima (虎島). The islands form part of the Setonaikai National Park.

== History ==
The islands were used by Buddhist monks for Shugendō. The folklore of the region holds that Ennogyoja, the founder of shugendo, underwent training on the steep cliffs of Tomogashima in the seventh to eighth centuries. This gave rise to the nickname of "The island of shugendo (mountain asceticism)" for Tomogashima. The first mound of the Katsuragi 28 Shuku is located on Torajima ("Tiger Island").

Later, during the Meiji period, a brick fort and lighthouse were built. Also during this time gun batteries and other defences, along with various support facilities, were constructed to counter foreign warships. Tomogashima was a critical component of the Shusei Kokubō (守勢国防 - i.e. "Static Defence") policy of the 1870s and 1880s, which emphasised coastal defences. Access to the cluster by the public was strictly prohibited by the Imperial Japanese Army up to the end of World War II.

== Depictions in art ==
Tomogashima is the subject of a scroll of 1661 in the Shōgo-in in Kyoto by Kanō Tan'yū as well as an anonymous work of 1798 in the British Museum. The island is the basis for the fictional Hitogashima Island in the Summer Time Rendering manga and anime series.

== Climate ==
Climate data for Tomogashima (1998−2020 normals, extremes 1998−present)
Month	Jan	Feb	Mar	Apr	May	Jun	Jul	Aug	Sep	Oct	Nov	Dec	Year
Record high °C (°F)	17.8 (64.0)	20.2 (68.4)	21.4 (70.5)	26.7 (80.1)	30.1 (86.2)	33.2 (91.8)	38.1 (100.6)	39.4 (102.9)	35.6 (96.1)	31.7 (89.1)	24.9 (76.8)	22.9 (73.2)	39.4 (102.9)
Mean daily maximum °C (°F)	9.9 (49.8)	10.2 (50.4)	13.4 (56.1)	18.0 (64.4)	22.3 (72.1)	25.2 (77.4)	28.9 (84.0)	31.2 (88.2)	28.4 (83.1)	23.1 (73.6)	17.7 (63.9)	12.5 (54.5)	20.1 (68.1)
Daily mean °C (°F)	6.8 (44.2)	6.8 (44.2)	9.5 (49.1)	14.0 (57.2)	18.3 (64.9)	21.7 (71.1)	25.4 (77.7)	27.1 (80.8)	24.5 (76.1)	19.7 (67.5)	14.7 (58.5)	9.5 (49.1)	16.5 (61.7)
Mean daily minimum °C (°F)	4.4 (39.9)	4.2 (39.6)	6.5 (43.7)	10.9 (51.6)	15.4 (59.7)	19.4 (66.9)	23.3 (73.9)	24.7 (76.5)	22.1 (71.8)	17.3 (63.1)	12.2 (54.0)	7.1 (44.8)	14.0 (57.1)
Record low °C (°F)	−2.6 (27.3)	−1.6 (29.1)	0.7 (33.3)	4.4 (39.9)	9.0 (48.2)	14.6 (58.3)	18.8 (65.8)	19.9 (67.8)	15.4 (59.7)	10.5 (50.9)	3.7 (38.7)	0.3 (32.5)	−2.6 (27.3)
Average precipitation mm (inches)	41.5 (1.63)	57.7 (2.27)	86.7 (3.41)	83.6 (3.29)	124.2 (4.89)	166.2 (6.54)	148.4 (5.84)	105.5 (4.15)	178.8 (7.04)	171.6 (6.76)	89.9 (3.54)	62.0 (2.44)	1,288 (50.71)
Average precipitation days (≥ 1.0 mm)	5.4	6.6	8.6	8.6	8.9	11.2	9.9	6.4	9.7	8.9	5.7	5.8	95.7
Mean monthly sunshine hours	158.0	150.8	190.0	196.6	219.1	165.1	200.6	244.5	176.5	171.5	153.7	149.6	2,200.5
Source: Japan Meteorological Agency

== See also ==
- Tomogashima Lighthouse
- Setonaikai National Park
- Imperial Japanese Navy
- List of Army Fortresses in Japan
