= Japanese ship Asama =

At least two warships of Japan have borne the name Asama:

- Japanese frigate Asama a screw frigate launched in 1868 and struck in 1894
- Japanese cruiser Asama an Asama-class cruiser launched in 1898 and broken up in 1946
