= Shigetarō Yoshimatsu =

Japanese admiral (1859–1935)

- 吉松茂太郎
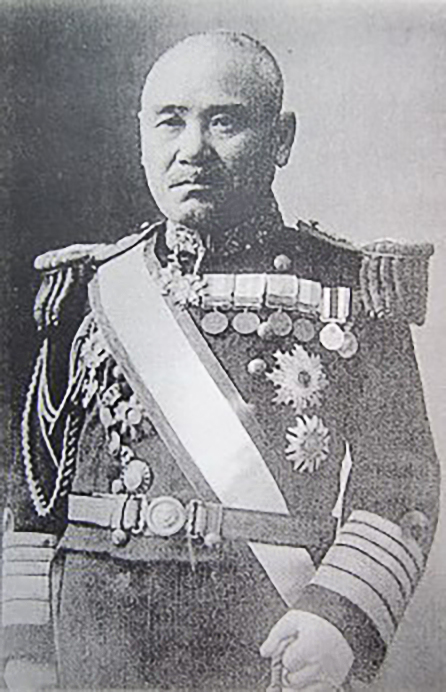
- Born: February 6, 1859; Nakamura, Tosa, Tokugawa
- Died: January 5, 1935 (aged 75); Location unknown
- Alma mater: Imperial Japanese Naval Academy
- Military career
- Allegiance: Japan
- Branch: Imperial Japanese Navy
- Service years: 1880 – 1929
- Rank: Admiral
- Commands: Tokiwa
- Conflicts: First Sino-Japanese War; Russo-Japanese War; Battle of Tsushima

Shigetarō Yoshimatsu (吉松茂太郎, Yoshimatsu Shigetarō; February 6, 1859 – January 5, 1935) (sometimes spelled Motaro) was a Japanese admiral during the First Sino-Japanese War and the Russo-Japanese War. He was known for commanding the Tokiwa during the Battle of Tsushima.

== Early naval career ==
Born as the eldest son of Maya Yoshimatsu, a feudal retainer of the Tosa-Nakamura Clan who later became a judge. He was well-versed in Chinese poetry because his father ran a school for Chinese studies in his home. After going through the domain school Chidokan and Kaisei School, he graduated from the Imperial Japanese Naval Academy's 7th Class on 1880 and became a second lieutenant candidate, and was commissioned as a second lieutenant in 1883. In 1885, he went on a business trip to the United Kingdom as a member of the cruise committee of the armored cruiser Naniwa and returned to Japan the following year as a member of the Naniwa crew. In 1888, he went to study in France, where he boarded a French warship for field research, and went on a business trip to the United Kingdom as a military construction supervisor and returned to Japan in 1893.

== Service in active wars ==
In 1893, he served as crew leader of the gunboat Oshima, and in the following year, crew leader of the cruiser Yoshino and served in the First Sino-Japanese War. After that, he successively served as a Staff Officer in the Standing Fleet, a Kure Naval District Staff Officer, a Naval War College Instructor, the 1st Chief of Naval General Staff, the Chief of Staff of the Standing Fleet and the Sasebo Naval District, and Captain of the Naniwa. In 1901, he became the captain of the Takasago, and the following year, he was dispatched to the United Kingdom with Asama to participate in the Coronation of Edward VII and Alexandra as well as reviewing the fleet. In 1904, he became captain of Tokiwa and participated in the Russo-Japanese War within the Battle off Ulsan and the Battle of Tsushima.

== Later years ==
In 1905, he became Rear Admiral of the Navy and chief of staff of Sasebo Naval District and Kure Naval District as well as Commander of the 1st Fleet and in 1907, he was appointed Commander of the Training Fleet. After that, he successively served as principal of the Imperial Japanese Naval Academy, principal of the Naval War College, commander of the Takeshiki Guard District, commander of the 2nd Fleet, commander of the Naval Education Headquarters, commander of the Kure Naval District, and commander-in-chief of the Combined Fleet. In 1918, he was promoted to Admiral and became military councilor but retired by 1929.

== Court ranks ==
- December 25, 1883: Senior 8th Rank
- December 16, 1891: Senior 7th Rank
- April 15, 1895: Junior 6th Rank
- March 8, 1898: Senior 6th Rank
- November 2, 1899: Junior 5th Rank
- December 10, 1909: Junior 4th Rank
- December 10, 1911: Senior 4th Rank
- January 30, 1915: Junior 3rd Rank
- February 12, 1918: Senior 3rd Rank
- August 20, 1920: Junior 2nd Rank

== Awards ==
- Order of the Rising Sun, 5th Class with a single ray (September 27, 1895)
- Order of the Golden Kite, 5th Class (September 27, 1895)
- Meiji 278 Service Insignia (November 18, 1895)
- Order of the Golden Kite, 3rd Class (April 1, 1906)
- Meiji 378 Service Insignia
- Order of the Sacred Treasure, 1st Class (January 30, 1915)
- Order of the Rising Sun, 1st Class (November 7, 1915)
- Grand Order Commemorative Badge (November 11, 1915)
- Taishō 3 to 9 campaign service medal (November 1, 1920)

=== Foreign awards ===
- Belgium: Order of Leopold, 3rd Class with sword
- Italy: Order of Saints Maurice and Lazarus, 3rd Class
- Siam: Order of the White Elephant, 3rd Class
- United Kingdom: King Edward VII Coronation Medal
