= Japanese ship Izumo =

At least two warships of Japan have borne the name Izumo:

- Japanese cruiser Izumo, an Izumo-class cruiser launched in 1899 and scrapped in 1946
- JS Izumo, a helicopter carrier launched in 2013
