= Izumo-class cruiser =

Pair of armored cruisers built for the Japanese Navy

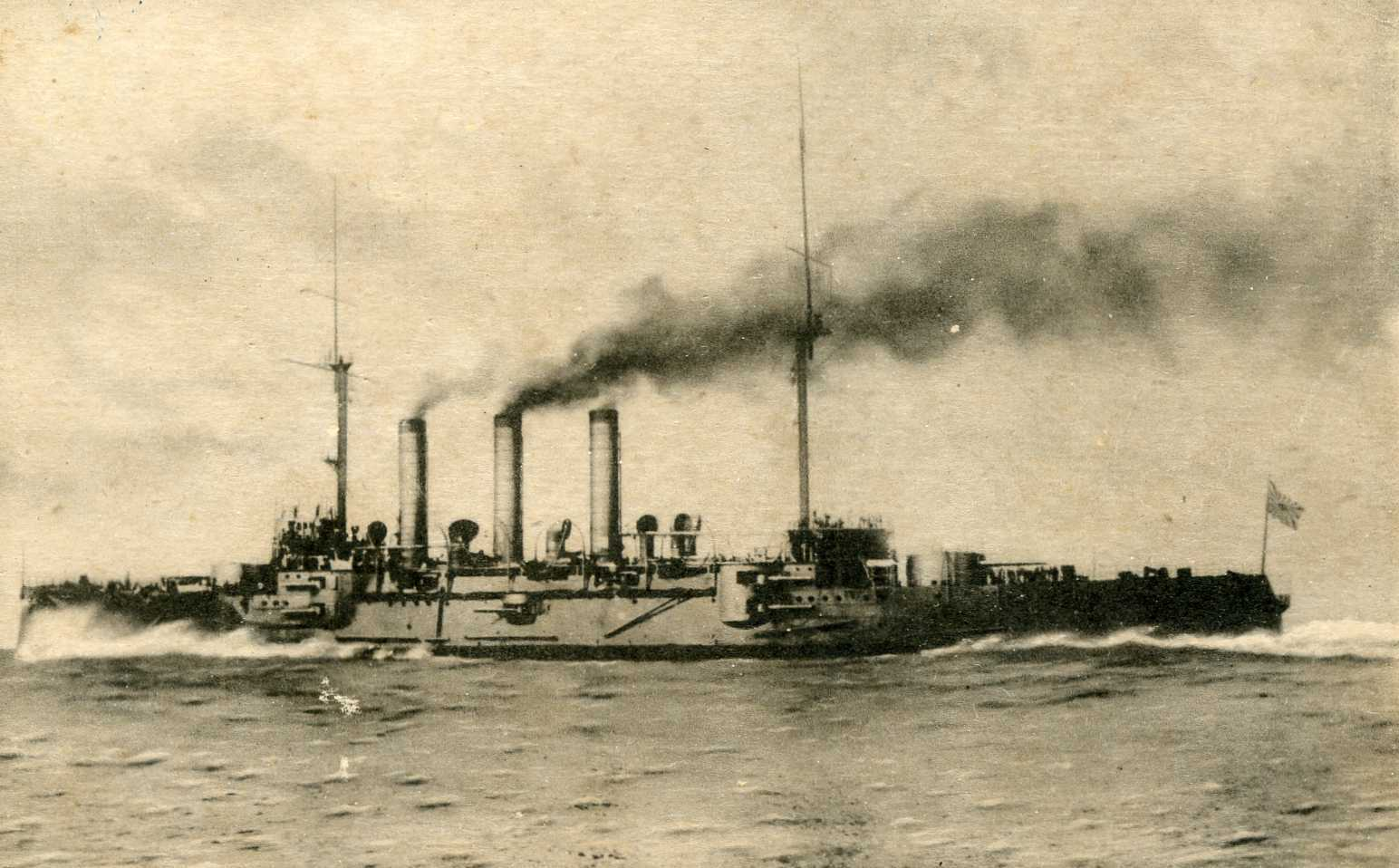
- A postcard of Iwate at speed, circa 1905–1915

Class overview
- Name: Izumo class
- Builders: Armstrong Whitworth, United Kingdom
- Operators: Imperial Japanese Navy
- Preceded by: Asama class
- Succeeded by: Yakumo
- Built: 1898–1901
- In commission: 1900–1945
- Completed: 2
- Lost: 2

General characteristics
- Type: Armored cruiser
- Displacement: 9,423–9,503 t (9,274–9,353 long tons)
- Length: 132.28 m (434 ft) (o/a)
- Beam: 20.94 m (68 ft 8 in)
- Draft: 7.21–7.26 m (23 ft 8 in – 23 ft 10 in)
- Installed power: 24 Belleville boilers; 14,500 ihp (10,800 kW)
- Propulsion: 2 shafts; 2 triple-expansion steam engines
- Speed: 20.75 knots (38.43 km/h; 23.88 mph)
- Range: 7,000 nmi (13,000 km; 8,100 mi) at 10 knots (19 km/h; 12 mph)
- Complement: 672
- Armament: 2 × twin 8 in (203 mm) guns; 14 × single 6 in (152 mm) guns; 12 × single 12 pdr (3 in (76 mm)) guns; 8 × single 2.5 pdr (1.5 in (38 mm)) Yamauchi guns; 4 × 18 in (457 mm) torpedo tubes
- Armor: Waterline belt: 89–178 mm (3.5–7.0 in); Deck: 63 mm (2.5 in); Gun turret: 160 mm (6.3 in); Barbette: 152 mm (6.0 in); Casemate: 51–152 mm (2.0–6.0 in); Conning tower: 356 mm (14.0 in); Bulkhead: 127 mm (5.0 in)

The Izumo-class cruisers (出雲型装甲巡洋艦, Izumo-gata sōkōjun'yōkan) were a pair of armored cruisers built for the Imperial Japanese Navy (IJN) in the late 1890s. As Japan lacked the industrial capacity to build such warships itself, the vessels were built in Britain. They were part of the "Six-Six Fleet" expansion program that began after the defeat of China during the First Sino-Japanese War of 1894–1895. The sister ships participated in three of the four main naval battles of the Russo-Japanese War of 1904–1905—the Battle of Port Arthur, the Battle off Ulsan and the Battle of Tsushima—but played a much more minor role in World War I.

Iwate was first used as a training ship in 1916 and remained in that role for most of the rest of her career. Her sister, Izumo, was mostly used for training during the 1920s, but became flagship of the IJN forces in China in 1932. She was involved in the Shanghai Incident that year and in the Second Sino-Japanese War that began five years later. The ship was used in the early stages of the Philippines Campaign during the Pacific War until she struck a mine at the end of 1941. Izumo joined her sister as a training ship in home waters in 1943. Both ships were sunk in a series of American air attacks on the naval base at Kure in July 1945. Their wrecks were refloated after the war and scrapped.

== Background and design ==
Japan initiated the 1896 Naval Expansion Plan after the First Sino-Japanese War of 1894–95. The plan included four armored cruisers and four battleships, all of which had to be ordered from foreign shipyards as Japan lacked the capability to build them itself. Further consideration of the Russian building program caused the IJN to believe that the battleships ordered under the original plan would not be sufficient to counter the Imperial Russian Navy. Budgetary limitations prevented ordering more battleships and the IJN decided to expand the number of more affordable armored cruisers to be ordered from four to six ships. The revised plan is commonly known as the "Six-Six Fleet". These ships were purchased using the £30,000,000 indemnity paid by China after losing the First Sino-Japanese War. Unlike most of their contemporaries, which were designed for commerce raiding or to defend colonies and trade routes, the Izumo class was intended as fleet scouts and to be employed in the battleline.

Construction of the Izumo-class ships was awarded to the British shipbuilder Armstrong Whitworth of Elswick, the same shipyard that had built the earlier two Asama-class armored cruisers of the "Six-Six Fleet". They were also designed by Sir Philip Watts, who took advantage of rapidly advancing boiler technology to substitute lighter Belleville boilers in lieu of the cylindrical boilers of the earlier ships and used the weight saved to increase the thickness of the protective deck and improve the hull structure. The increased number of boilers required an extra funnel, which became the primary means of distinguishing between the two classes.

== Description ==
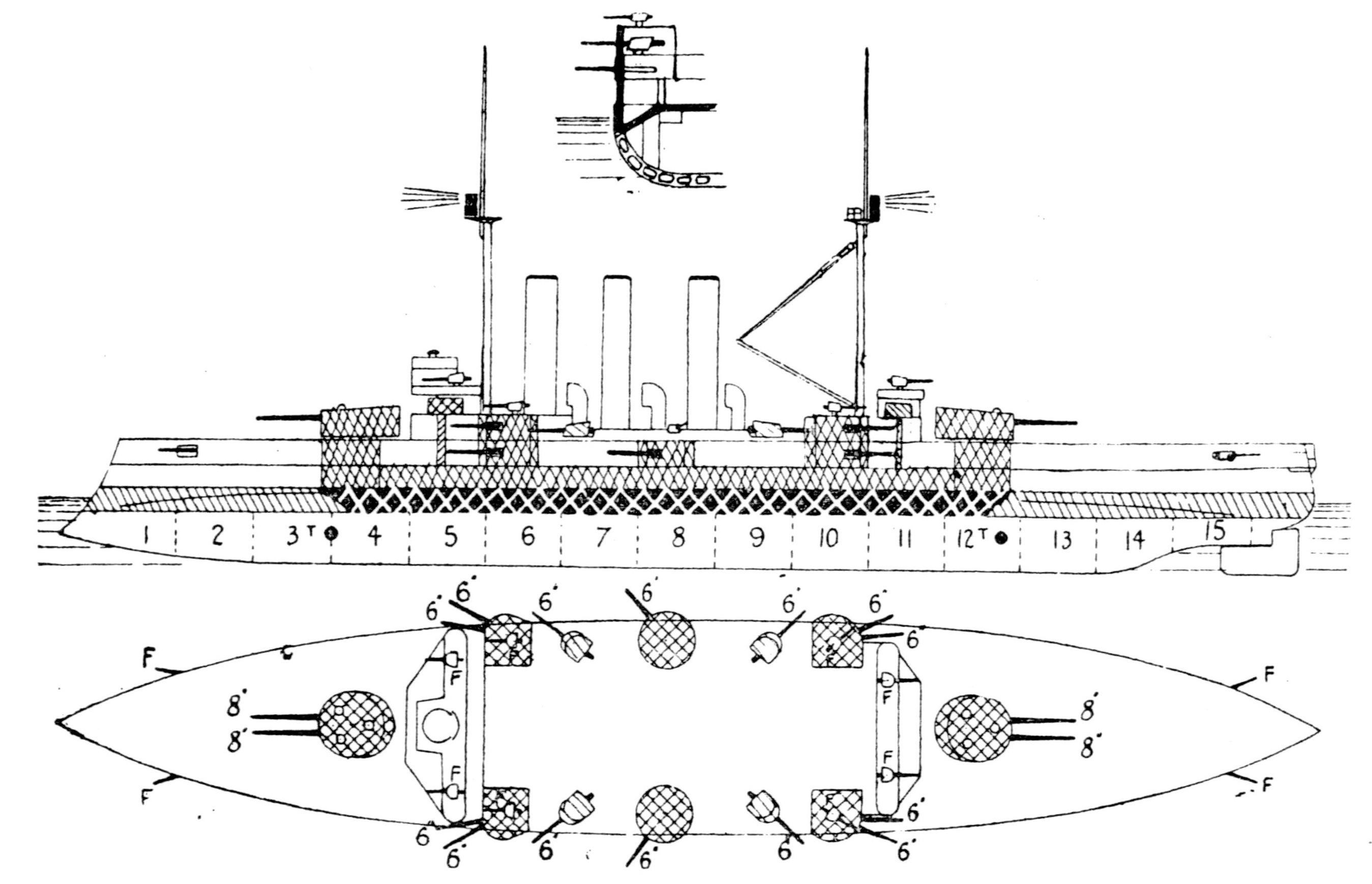
Left plan, elevation and half section of the Izumo class from Jane's Fighting Ships, 1904

The Izumo-class ships were 132.28 meters (434 ft 0 in) long overall and 121.92 meters (400 ft 0 in) between perpendiculars. They had a beam of 20.94 meters (68 ft 8 in) and had an average draft of 7.21 to 7.26 meters (23 ft 8 in to 23 ft 10 in). The ships displaced 9,423 to 9,503 metric tons (9,274 to 9,353 long tons) at normal load and 10,235 to 10,305 metric tons (10,073 to 10,142 long tons) at deep load. They had metacentric heights of 0.73 to 0.88 meters (2 ft 5 in to 2 ft 11 in). Their crew consisted of 672 officers and enlisted men.

The ships had two 4-cylinder triple-expansion steam engines, each driving a single propeller shaft. Steam for the engines was provided by 24 Belleville boilers and the engines were rated at a total of 14,500 indicated horsepower (10,800 kW). The sisters had a designed speed of 20.75 knots (38.43 km/h; 23.88 mph) and both exceeded it by at least a 1 knot (1.9 km/h; 1.2 mph) during their sea trials from 15,739 to 16,078 ihp (11,737 to 11,989 kW). They carried up to 1,527 long tons (1,551 t) of coal and could steam for 7,000 nautical miles (13,000 km; 8,100 mi) at a speed of 10 knots (19 km/h; 12 mph).

=== Armament ===
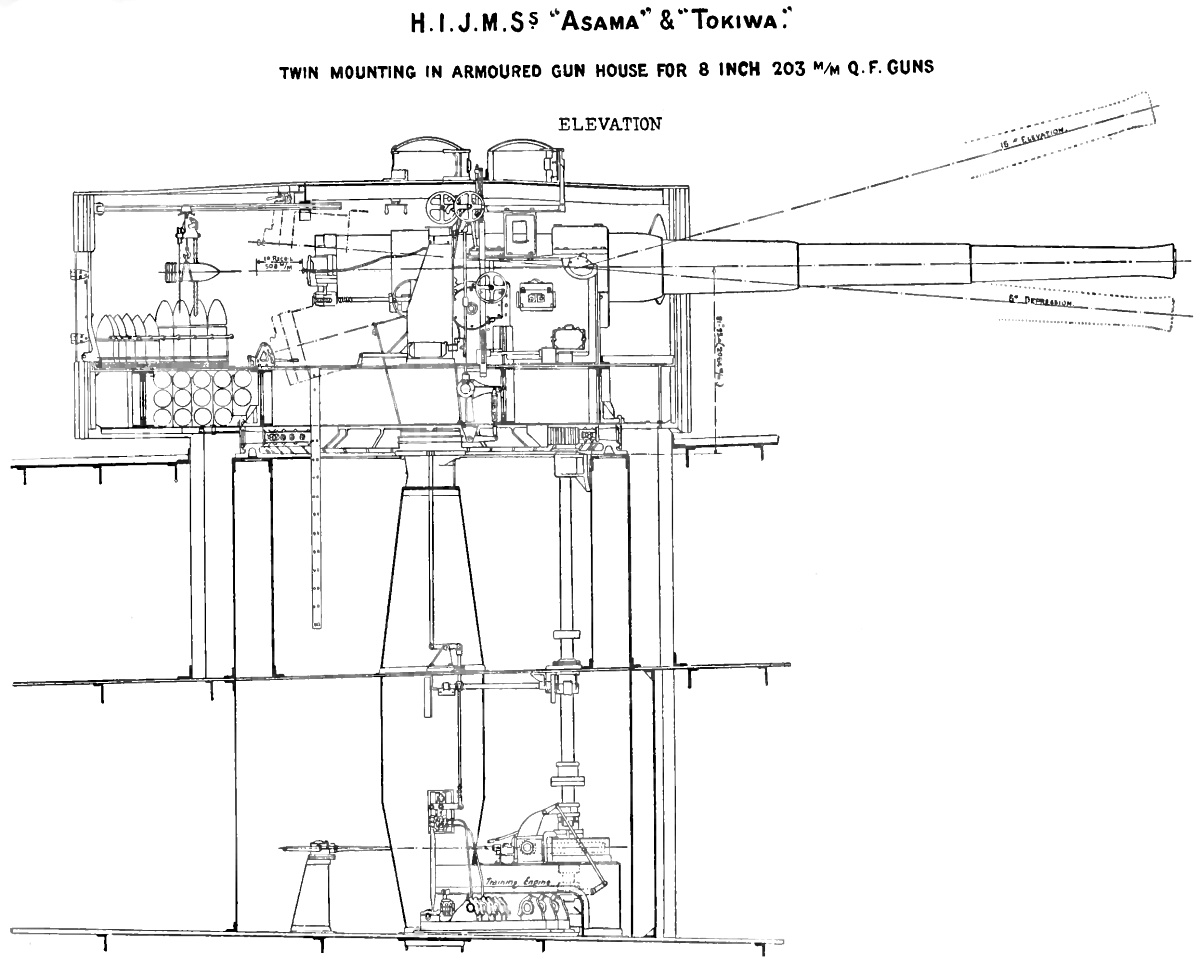
Cross-section of the eight-inch gun turret used by all the "Six-Six Fleet" armored cruisers

The main armament for all of the "Six-Six Fleet" armored cruisers was four Armstrong Whitworth-built 45-caliber eight-inch (203 mm) guns in twin-gun turrets fore and aft of the superstructure. The electrically operated turrets were capable of 130° rotation left and right, and the guns could be elevated to +30° and depressed to −5°. Each turret accommodated 65 shells, but could only be reloaded through doors in the turret floor and the ship's deck that allowed the electric winch in the turret to hoist shells up from the shell room deep in the hull. The guns were manually loaded and had a rate of fire about 1.2 rounds per minute. The eight-inch gun fired 250-pound (113.5 kg) armor-piercing (AP) projectiles at a muzzle velocity of 2,500 feet per second (760 m/s) to a range of 20,000 yards (18,000 m).

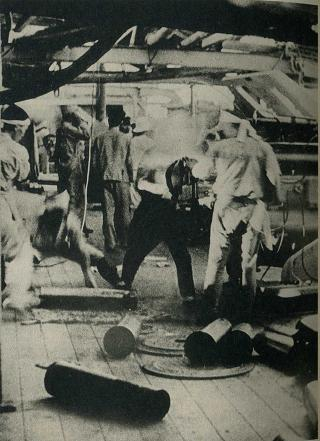
Crewmen working the six-inch guns

The secondary armament consisted of fourteen Elswick Ordnance Company "Pattern Z" quick-firing (QF), 40-caliber, six-inch (152 mm) guns. All but four of these guns were mounted in armored casemates on the main and upper decks, and their mounts on the upper deck were protected by gun shields. Their 100-pound (45.4 kg) AP shells were fired at a muzzle velocity of 2,300 feet per second (700 m/s). The ships were also equipped with a dozen 40-caliber QF 12-pounder (3 in (76 mm)) 12-cwt guns (Note: "Cwt" is the abbreviation for hundredweight, 12 cwt referring to the weight of the gun.) and eight QF 2.5-pounder (1.5 in (38 mm)) Yamauchi guns as close-range defense against torpedo boats. The former gun fired three-inch, 12.5-pound (5.7 kg) projectiles at a muzzle velocity of 2,359 feet per second (719 m/s).

The Izumo-class ships were equipped with four submerged 18-inch (457 mm) torpedo tubes, two on each broadside. The Type 30 torpedo had a 100-kilogram (220 lb) warhead and three range/speed settings: 870 yards (800 m) at 27 knots (50 km/h; 31 mph), 1,100 yards (1,000 m) at 23.6 knots (43.7 km/h; 27.2 mph) or 3,300 yards (3,000 m) at 14.2 knots (26.3 km/h; 16.3 mph).

=== Protection ===
All of the "Six-Six Fleet" armored cruisers used the same armor scheme with some minor differences, one of which was that the four later ships all used Krupp cemented armor. The waterline belt ran the full length of the ships and its thickness varied from 7.0 inches (178 mm) amidships to 3.5 inches (89 mm) at the bow and stern. The thickest part of the belt covered the middle of the ship for a length of 275 feet 2 inches (83.87 m). It had a height of 7 feet 0 inches (2.13 m), of which 4 feet 4 inches to 4 feet 7 inches (1.33 to 1.39 m) was normally underwater. The upper strake of belt armor was 5.0 inches (127 mm) thick and extended from the upper edge of the waterline belt to the main deck. It extended 167 feet 11 inches to 174 feet 11 inches (51.18 to 53.31 m) from the forward to the rear barbette. The Izumo class had oblique 5-inch armored bulkhead that closed off the ends of the central armored citadel.

The barbettes, gun turrets and the front of the casemates were all 6 inches thick while the sides and rear of the casemates were protected by 51 millimeters (2.0 in) of armor. The deck was 63 millimeters (2.5 in) thick and the armor protecting the conning tower was 356 millimeters (14.0 in) in thickness. The ships had 30 watertight compartments in their double bottom and an additional 136 or 137 between the bottom and the upper deck.

== Ships ==
Construction data
Ship	Builder	Laid down	Launched	Completed	Fate
Izumo	Armstrong Whitworth, Elswick	14 May 1898	19 September 1899	25 September 1900	Sunk, 28 July 1945; broken up, 1947
Iwate	Armstrong Whitworth, Elswick	11 November 1898	29 March 1900	18 March 1901	Sunk, 25 July 1945; scrapped, 1946–1947

== Service ==
=== Russo-Japanese War ===
The sisters spent most of the Russo-Japanese War as flagships together in the 2nd Division of the 2nd Fleet; Iwate for the divisional commander, Rear Admiral Misu Sotarō, and Izumo for the fleet commander, Vice Admiral Kamimura Hikonojō. They participated in the Battle of Port Arthur on 9 February 1904, when Vice Admiral Tōgō Heihachirō led the Combined Fleet in an attack on the Russian ships of the Pacific Squadron anchored just outside Port Arthur. Tōgō had expected the earlier surprise night attack by his destroyers to be much more successful than it was, anticipating that the Russians would be badly disorganized and weakened, but they had recovered from their surprise and were ready for his attack. Iwate was moderately damaged by the Russians, but Izumo only slightly.

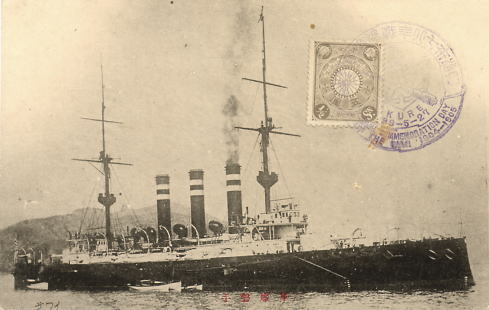
A postcard of Iwate at anchor, before 1905

In April 1904, the division was tasked to contain the Russian armored cruisers based at Vladivostok, but failed to do so until 13 August when the latter tried to rendezvous with the ships that attempted to breakout from Port Arthur. Unbeknownst to the Russians, Tōgō had defeated the ships from Port Arthur during the Battle of the Yellow Sea on 10 August and the Russian squadron from Vladivostok was intercepted off Ulsan, Korea by the 2nd Division. The steering of the Russian cruiser Rurik was damaged early in the battle and the Russians made several attempts to prevent the Japanese from concentrating fire on her, but were ultimately forced to abandon her to her fate. Kamimura left Rurik to the tender ministrations of his reinforcements and pursued the two remaining Russian ships for a time before breaking off pursuit prematurely based on an incorrect report that Izumo had expended most of her ammunition. That ship was hit over 20 times, but suffered fewer than 20 men killed or wounded. Iwate, in contrast, was hit far fewer times, but one of them started a major ammunition fire that killed or wounded dozens of men. After the battle, the sisters were refitted and assigned to different units, escorting troop convoys to northern Korea, providing cover while a minefield was laid off Vladivostok, and blockading the Tsugaru Strait until the Russian ships from the Baltic Fleet approached Japan in mid-1905.

==== Battle of Tsushima ====
The Russian 2nd and 3rd Pacific Squadrons were spotted on the morning on 27 May 1904 and Tōgō ordered his ships to put to sea. Izumo and Iwate had rejoined the 2nd Division in anticipation of this battle and Kamimura's ships confirmed the initial spotting later that morning before joining Tōgō's battleships. Together with most of the Japanese battleships, the division opened fire at 14:10 on the Russian battleship Oslyabya, which was forced to fall out of formation at 14:50 and sank 20 minutes later. After a failed torpedo attack was repulsed by Iwate and several other cruisers around the same time, the Russian battleship Knyaz Suvorov suddenly appeared out of the mist at 15:35 at short range. Kamimura's ships engaged her for five minutes before she disappeared back into the mists. Later in the day, Kamimura led his division in a fruitless pursuit of some of the Russian cruisers around 17:30. He abandoned his chase around 18:03 and encountered the Russian battleline about a half hour later. He stayed at long range and his ships fired when practicable before ceasing fire at 19:30.

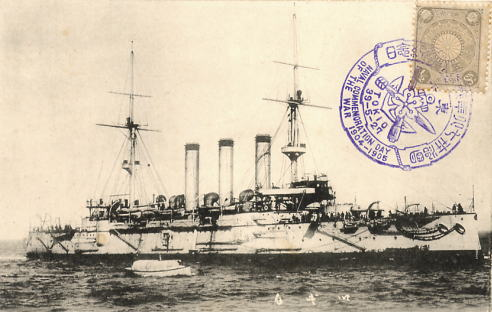
A Japanese postcard of Izumo at anchor, 1905

The surviving Russian ships were spotted the next morning and the Japanese ships opened fire and stayed beyond the range at which the Russian ships could effectively reply. Rear Admiral Nikolai Nebogatov therefore decided to surrender his ships as he could neither return fire nor close the range. Well after Nebogatov's surrender, the coast defense ship Admiral Ushakov was spotted well south of Nebogatov's ships and Iwate and the armored cruiser, Yakumo, were tasked to pursue her. The Japanese ships demanded that the Russians surrender when they came within range, but her captain refused. Admiral Ushakov attempted to close the range to bring the Japanese cruisers within range of her guns, but they were fast enough to keep the range open and the Russian ship could not hit either of them. After about half an hour, Admiral Ushakov had been heavily damaged to bear and her commander ordered his crew to abandon ship and the scuttling charges detonated. Both Iwate and Izumo were struck several times during the battle, but neither was significantly damaged and casualties were light. After the battle, the division covered amphibious landings in northeastern Korea in July and August before the war ended.

=== Subsequent service ===
Izumo was ordered to patrol the west coast of Mexico to safeguard Japanese interests and nationals during the Mexican Revolution and was still there when Japan declared war on the German Empire on 23 August 1914. She was then tasked to search for German commerce raiders and protect Allied shipping off the western coasts of North and Central America. The ship assisted the armored cruiser Asama in early 1915, when she struck a rock off Baja California. In 1917, Izumo became the flagship of the Japanese squadron deployed in the Mediterranean Sea. After the war, she sailed to Great Britain to take control of some ex-German submarines and then escorted them part of the way back to Japan.

Iwate played a minor role in the war, participating in the Battle of Tsingtao before sailing to the South Sea Islands to search for German commerce raiders. The ship began the first of her many training cruises for naval cadets of the Imperial Japanese Navy Academy in 1916, a task that would last until the end of 1939. Izumo began making training voyages of her own during the 1920s.

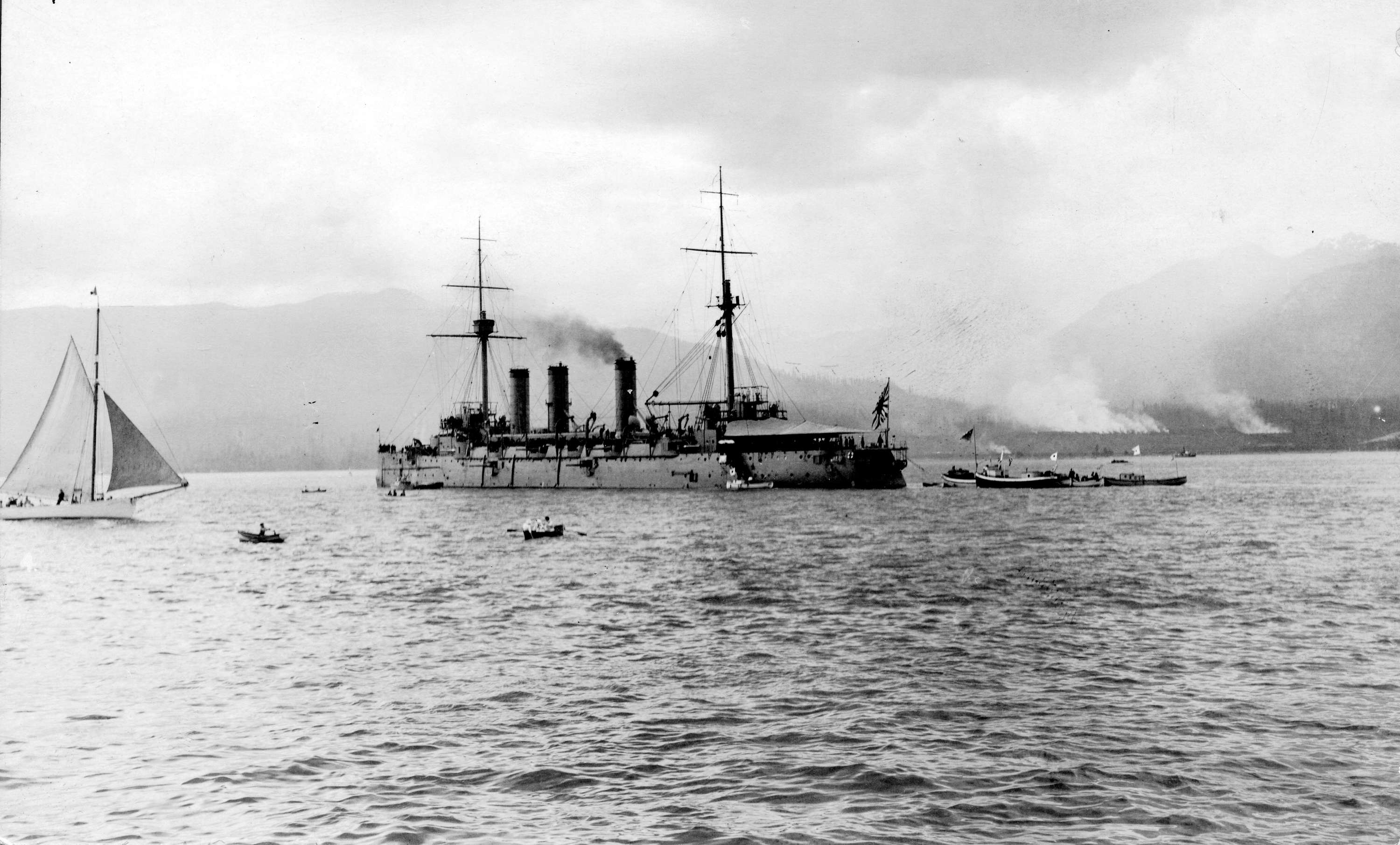
Izumo at anchor in Burrard Inlet, Vancouver, Canada, February 1925

In 1924, four of the ships' 12-pounder guns were removed, as were all of their QF 2.5-pounder guns, and a single 40-caliber 8 cm/40 3rd Year Type anti-aircraft (AA) gun was added. The gun had a maximum elevation of +75 degrees, and could fire a 3-inch, 12.5 lb (5.67 kg) projectile with a muzzle velocity of 2,200 ft/s (680 m/s) to a maximum height of 23,600 feet (7,200 m). Refitted again in 1930–31, their torpedo tubes were removed as were all of her main deck 6-inch guns and their casemates plated over; they now carried only four 12-pounders. At that time, Iwate also had her boilers replaced by six water-tube boilers, but Izumo was not reboilered until 1935. The new boilers produced less steam which limited engine power to 7,000 ihp (5,200 kW) and reduced their top speed to 16 knots (30 km/h; 18 mph).

==== China service and World War II ====
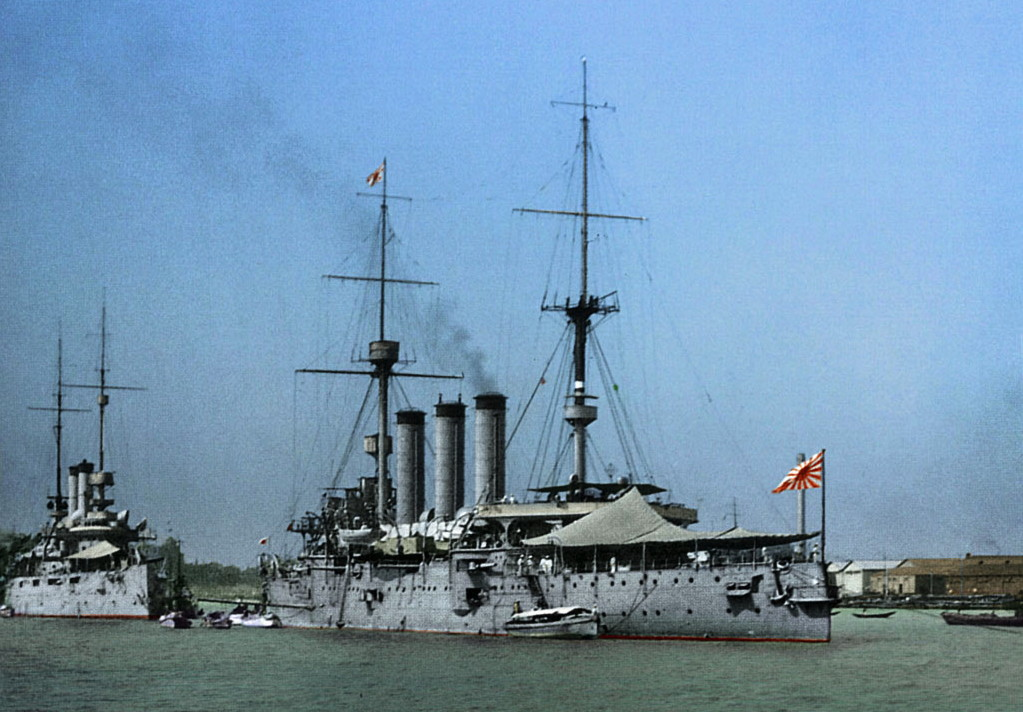
Izumo at anchor in the Huangpu River, Shanghai, 1932. The American armored cruiser USS Rochester is anchored to the left.

In 1932, during the First Shanghai Incident, Izumo became the flagship of the newly re-established 3rd Fleet that garrisoned Japanese-occupied China. Two years later, she was equipped to operate a floatplane at the Sasebo Naval Arsenal. During the Second Sino-Japanese War, the ship participated in the Battle of Shanghai in mid-1937 during which she provided naval gunfire support to Japanese troops ashore.

Still in Shanghai at the beginning of the Pacific War on 8 December 1941, Izumo captured the American river gunboat USS Wake and assisted in sinking the British river gunboat HMS Peterel. On 31 December, the cruiser struck a mine in Lingayen Gulf while supporting Japanese forces during the Philippines Campaign. During this period, Iwate was still serving as a training ship in home waters. The sisters were briefly re-classified as 1st-class cruisers on 1 July 1942 before they became training ships in 1943. Izumo returned to Japan late that year and joined her sister in training naval cadets.

In early 1945, the sisters were rearmed when their 8-inch guns were replaced by four 12.7 cm (5.0 in) Type 89 dual-purpose guns in two twin mounts and four of their remaining 6-inch guns were removed. When firing at surface targets, the Type 89 gun had a range of 16,100 yards (14,700 m); they had a maximum ceiling of 30,970 feet (9,440 m) at an elevation of +90 degrees. Their maximum rate of fire was 14 rounds a minute, but their sustained rate of fire was around 8 rounds per minute. Their light anti-aircraft armament was significantly reinforced by the addition of 9 (Iwate) and 14 (Izumo) license-built Hotchkiss 25-millimeter Type 96 light AA guns in single, double and triple mounts and two 13.2-millimeter Hotchkiss machine guns in single mounts. The 25 mm (0.98 in) weapon was the standard Japanese light anti-aircraft gun during World War II, but it suffered from severe design shortcomings that rendered it a largely ineffective weapon. The twin and triple mounts lacked sufficient speed in train or elevation; the gun sights were unable to handle fast targets; the gun exhibited excessive vibration; the magazine was too small and, finally, the gun produced excessive muzzle blast. The weapon had a maximum range of 24,600 feet (7,500 m), but effective range was only about 4,900–9,800 feet (1,500–3,000 m).

The sisters were attacked, but not hit, during the American aerial attack on Kure in July 1945. However, the shockwaves from near misses caused extensive flooding in both ships. Iwate sank in shallow water on 25 July and Izumo capsized three days later. Both ships were removed from the navy list on 20 November and their wrecks were raised and scrapped in 1946–47.
