= Japanese cruiser Tokiwa =

Asama-class cruiser

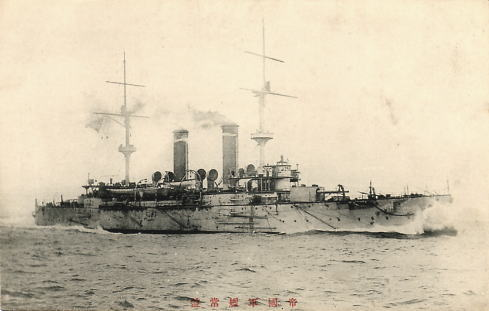
- Tokiwa in 1905

History

Empire of Japan
- Name: Tokiwa
- Awarded: 6 July 1897
- Builder: Armstrong Whitworth, United Kingdom
- Laid down: 6 January 1897
- Launched: 6 July 1898
- Completed: 18 May 1899
- Commissioned: 19 May 1899
- Decommissioned: 9 August 1945
- Stricken: 30 November 1945
- Fate: Sunk by air attack, 9 August 1945; Scrapped, 1947

General characteristics (as built)
- Class & type: Asama-class armored cruiser
- Displacement: 9,667 t (9,514 long tons)
- Length: 134.72 m (442 ft 0 in) (o/a)
- Beam: 20.48 m (67 ft 2 in)
- Draft: 7.43 m (24 ft 5 in)
- Installed power: 18,000 ihp (13,000 kW); 12 Cylindrical boilers
- Propulsion: 2 Shafts; 2 Vertical triple-expansion steam engines
- Speed: 21 knots (39 km/h; 24 mph)
- Range: 10,000 nmi (19,000 km; 12,000 mi) at 10 knots (19 km/h; 12 mph)
- Complement: 676
- Armament: 2 × twin 20.3 cm/45 Type 41 naval guns; 14 × single QF 6-inch guns; 12 × single QF 12-pounder 12-cwt guns; 8 × single QF 2.5-pounder Yamauchi guns; 5 × single 457 mm (18.0 in) torpedo tubes
- Armor: Waterline belt: 89–178 mm (3.5–7.0 in); Deck: 51 mm (2.0 in); Gun Turret: 160 mm (6.3 in); Barbette: 152 mm (6.0 in); Casemate: 51–152 mm (2.0–6.0 in); Conning tower: 356 mm (14.0 in); Bulkhead: 127 mm (5.0 in)

Tokiwa (常盤) was the second and last Asama-class armored cruiser (Sōkō jun'yōkan) built for the Imperial Japanese Navy (IJN) in the late 1890s. As Japan lacked the industrial capacity to build such warships herself, the ship was built in Britain. She played minor roles in the Boxer Rebellion of 1900 and World War I, but was very active during the Russo-Japanese War of 1904–05 where she participated in the Battle of Port Arthur, the Battle off Ulsan, and the Battle of Tsushima. After the war she was sometimes used as a training ship for naval cadets.

Tokiwa was converted into a minelayer in 1922–24. She was placed in reserve in 1927 after she was damaged by an accidental explosion of several mines. The ship was deployed to Northern China in 1932–33 after the Japanese invasion of Manchuria. After her refit in 1937, Tokiwa returned to active duty and was assigned to the 4th Fleet in 1939. During the Pacific War, she participated in the occupation of the Gilbert Islands and Rabaul and Kavieng in New Guinea. Damaged by American aircraft shortly afterwards, the ship was forced to return to Japan for repairs. Tokiwa laid minefields during 1944–45 until she was twice damaged by American mines in 1945. After repairs were completed, the ship was badly damaged by American aircraft and her crew was forced to beach her lest she sink shortly before the end of the war. Tokiwa was salvaged in 1947 and subsequently broken up for scrap.

== Background and description ==
The 1896 Naval Expansion Plan was made after the First Sino-Japanese War and included four armored cruisers in addition to four more battleships, all of which had to be ordered from British shipyards as Japan lacked the capability to build them itself. Further consideration of the Russian building program caused the IJN to believe that the battleships ordered under the original plan would not be sufficient to counter the Imperial Russian Navy. Budgetary limitations prevented ordering more battleships and the IJN decided to expand the number of more affordable armored cruisers to be ordered from four to six ships. The revised plan is commonly known as the "Six-Six Fleet". Unlike most of their contemporaries which were designed for commerce raiding or to defend colonies and trade routes, Tokiwa and her half-sisters were intended as fleet scouts and to be employed in the battleline.

The ship was 134.72 meters (442 ft 0 in) long overall and 124.36 meters (408 ft 0 in) between perpendiculars. She had a beam of 20.48 meters (67 ft 2 in) and had an average draft of 7.4 meters (24 ft 3 in). Tokiwa displaced 9,667 metric tons (9,514 long tons) at normal load and 10,476 metric tons (10,311 long tons) at deep load. The ship had a metacentric height of 0.88 meters (2 ft 11 in). Her crew consisted of 676 officers and enlisted men.

Tokiwa had two 4-cylinder triple-expansion steam engines, each driving a single propeller shaft. Steam for the engines was provided by a dozen cylindrical boilers and the engines were rated at a total of 18,000 indicated horsepower (13,000 kW). The ship had a designed speed of 22 knots (41 km/h; 25 mph) and reached 23.1 knots (42.8 km/h; 26.6 mph) during her sea trials from 19,040 ihp (14,200 kW). She carried up to 1,390 long tons (1,410 t) of coal and could steam for 10,000 nautical miles (19,000 km; 12,000 mi) at a speed of 10 knots (19 km/h; 12 mph).

The main armament for all of the "Six-Six Fleet" armored cruisers was four eight-inch guns in twin-gun turrets fore and aft of the superstructure. The secondary armament consisted of 14 Elswick Ordnance Company "Pattern Z" quick-firing (QF), 6-inch (152 mm) guns. Only four of these guns were not mounted in armored casemates on the main and upper decks and their mounts on the upper deck were protected by gun shields. Tokiwa was also equipped with a dozen QF 12-pounder 12-cwt guns (Note: "Cwt" is the abbreviation for hundredweight, 12 cwt referring to the weight of the gun.) and eight QF 2.5-pounder Yamauchi guns as close-range defense against torpedo boats. The ship was equipped with five 457 mm (18.0 in) torpedo tubes, one above water in the bow and four submerged tubes, two on each broadside.

All of the "Six-Six Fleet" armored cruisers used the same armor scheme with some minor differences, of which the most important was that the two Asama-class ships used less tough Harvey armor. The waterline belt ran the full length of the ship and its thickness varied from 178 millimeters (7.0 in) amidships to 89 millimeters (3.5 in) at the bow and stern. It had a height of 2.13 meters (7 ft 0 in), of which 1.52 meters (5 ft 0 in) was normally underwater. The upper strake of belt armor was 127 millimeters (5.0 in) thick and extended from the upper edge of the waterline belt to the main deck. It extended 65.42 meters (214 ft 8 in) from the forward to the rear barbette. The Asama class had oblique 127 mm armored bulkheads that closed off the ends of the central armored citadel.

The barbettes, gun turrets and the front of the casemates were all 152 millimeters thick while the sides and rear of the casemates were protected by 51 millimeters (2.0 in) of armor. The deck was also 51 millimeters thick and the armor protecting the conning tower was 356 millimeters (14.0 in) in thickness.

== Construction and career ==
The contract for Tokiwa was signed on 6 July 1897 with Armstrong Whitworth. The ship had already been laid down at their shipyard in Elswick on 6 January 1897 as a speculative venture. She was launched on 6 July 1898 and completed on 18 May 1899. The ship departed for Japan the next day and arrived in Yokosuka on 16 July. Captain Dewa Shigetō had been appointed on 5 April to supervise her construction and bring her to Japan. He was relieved of command after his arrival by Captain Nakayama Nagaaki. The following year, Tokiwa supported Japanese forces during the Boxer Rebellion in China.

=== Russo-Japanese War ===
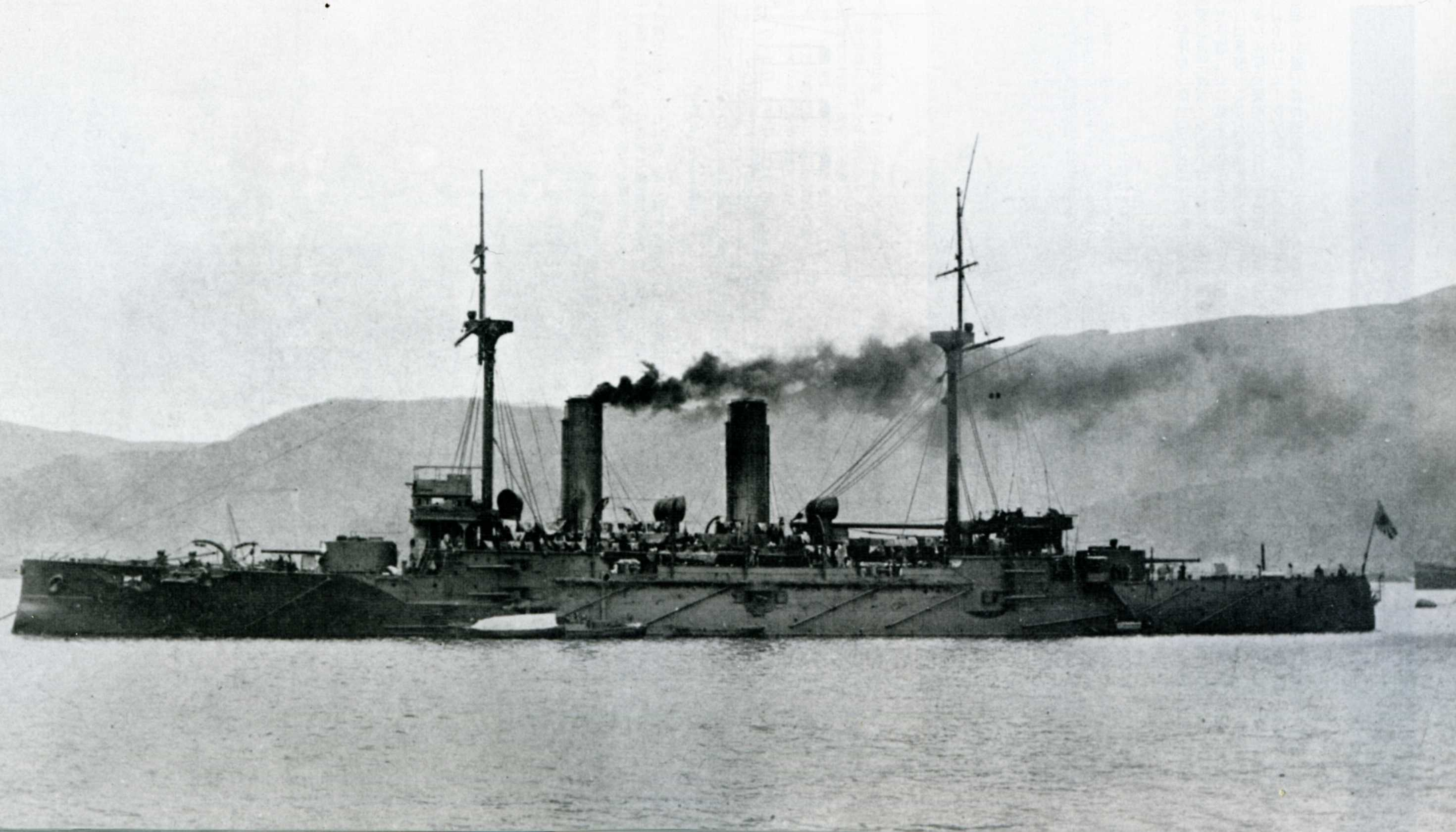
Tokiwa anchored in 1904

Sublieutenant Kichisaburō Nomura, later Foreign Minister, was appointed to the ship in July 1903 until the ship's return after the Battle off Ulsan in August 1904. Captain Shigetarō Yoshimatsu assumed command of Tokiwa on 18 January 1904. At the start of the Russo-Japanese War a few weeks later, the ship was assigned to the 2nd Division of the 2nd Fleet. She participated in the Battle of Port Arthur on 9 February 1904, when Vice Admiral Tōgō Heihachirō led the Combined Fleet in an attack on the Russian ships of the Pacific Squadron anchored just outside Port Arthur. Tōgō had expected the surprise night attack by his destroyers to be much more successful than it was, anticipating that the Russians would be badly disorganized and weakened, but they had recovered from their surprise and were ready for his attack. The Japanese ships were spotted by the protected cruiser Boyarin, which was patrolling offshore and alerted the Russians. Tōgō chose to attack the Russian coastal defenses with his main armament and engage the ships with his secondary guns. Splitting his fire proved to be a poor decision as the Japanese eight- and six-inch guns inflicted little damage on the Russian ships, which concentrated all their fire on the Japanese ships with some effect. Although many ships on both sides were hit, Russian casualties numbered some 150, while the Japanese suffered roughly 90 killed and wounded before Tōgō disengaged.

In early March, Tokiwa was detached from the 2nd Division and reassigned to Rear Admiral Dewa's 3rd Division. On 10 March, Tokiwa and the protected cruiser Chitose attempted to capture the disabled destroyer Steregushchiy, but were driven off by heavy fire from the shore defenses, although they managed to rescue the wounded crewmen. Tōgō successfully lured out a portion of the Russian Pacific Squadron on 13 April, including Vice Admiral Stepan Makarov's flagship, the battleship Petropavlovsk. During this action, Tokiwa engaged the Russian cruisers that preceded the battleships before falling back on Tōgō's battleships. When Makarov spotted the five Japanese battleships, he turned back for Port Arthur and his flagship ran into the minefield just laid by the Japanese. The ship sank in less than two minutes after one of her magazines exploded, and Makarov was one of the 677 killed. In addition to this loss, the battleship Pobeda was damaged by a mine.

Tokiwa rejoined the 2nd Division a few days later and Kamimura was ordered north in mid-April to cover the Sea of Japan and defend the Korea Strait against any attempt by the Vladivostok Independent Cruiser Squadron, under the command of Rear Admiral Karl Jessen, to break through and unite with the Pacific Squadron. The two units narrowly missed each other on the 24th in heavy fog and the Japanese proceeded to Vladivostok where they laid several minefields before arriving back at Wonsan on the 30th.

The division failed to intercept the Russian squadron as it attacked several transports south of Okinoshima Island on 15 June due to heavy rain and fog. The Russians sortied again on 30 June and Kamimura finally was able to intercept them the next day near Okinoshima. The light was failing when they were spotted and the Russians were able to disengage in the darkness. Jessen's ships sortied again on 17 July headed for the eastern coast of Japan to act as a diversion and pull Japanese forces out of the Sea of Japan and the Yellow Sea. The Russian ships passed through Tsugaru Strait two days later and began capturing ships bound for Japan. The arrival of the Russians off Tokyo Bay on the 24th caused the Naval General Staff to order Kamimura to sail for Cape Toi Misaki, Kyūshū, fearing that Jessen would circumnavigate Japan to reach Port Arthur. Two days later he was ordered north to the Kii Channel and then to Tokyo Bay on the 28th. The General Staff finally ordered him back to Tsushima Island on the 30th; later that day he received word that Jessen's ships had passed through the Tsugaru Strait early that morning and reached Vladivostok on 1 August.

==== Battle off Ulsan ====
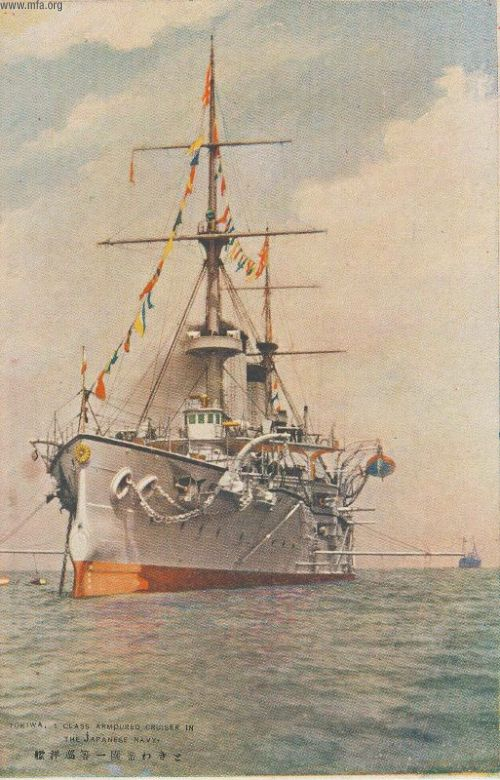
At anchor in a 1905 postcard

On 10 August, the ships at Port Arthur attempted a breakout to Vladivostok, but were turned back in the Battle of the Yellow Sea. Jessen was ordered to rendezvous with them, but the order was delayed. His three armored cruisers, Rossia, Gromoboi, and Rurik, had to raise steam, so he did not sortie until the evening of 13 August. By dawn he had reached Tsushima, but turned back when he failed to see any ships from the Port Arthur squadron. 36 miles (58 km) north of the island he encountered Kamimura's squadron, which consisted of four modern armored cruisers, Iwate, Izumo, Azuma, and Tokiwa. The two squadrons had passed during the night without spotting one another and each had reversed course around first light. This put the Japanese ships astride the Russian route to Vladivostok.

Jessen ordered his ships to turn to the northeast when he spotted the Japanese at 05:00 and they followed suit, albeit on a slightly converging course. Both sides opened fire around 05:23 at a range of 8,500 meters (9,300 yd). The Japanese ships concentrated their fire on Rurik, the rear ship of the Russian formation. She was hit fairly quickly and began to fall astern of the other two ships. Jessen turned southeast in an attempt to open the range, but this blinded the Russian gunners with the rising sun and prevented any of their broadside guns from bearing on the Japanese. About 06:00, Jessen turned 180° to starboard in an attempt to reach the Korean coast and to allow Rurik to rejoin the squadron. Kamimura followed suit around 06:10, but turned to port, which opened the range between the squadrons. Azuma then developed engine problems and the Japanese squadron slowed to conform with her best speed. Firing recommenced at 06:24 and Rurik was hit three times in the stern, flooding her steering compartment; she had to be steered with her engines. Her speed continued to decrease, further exposing her to Japanese fire, and her steering jammed to port around 06:40.

Jessen made another 180° turn in an attempt to interpose his two ships between the Japanese and Rurik, but the latter ship suddenly turn to starboard and increased speed and passed between Jessen's ships and the Japanese. Kamimura turned 180° as well so that both squadrons were heading southeast on parallel courses, but Jessen quickly made another 180° turn so that they headed on opposing courses. The Russians reversed course for the third time around 07:45 in another attempt to support Rurik although Rossia was on fire herself; her fires were extinguished about twenty minutes later. Kamimura circled Rurik to the south at 08:00 and allowed the other two Russian ships to get to his north and gave them an uncontested route to Vladivostok. Despite this, Jessen turned back once more at 08:15 and ordered Rurik to make her own way back to Vladivostok before turning north at his maximum speed, about 18 knots (33 km/h; 21 mph).

About this time Kamimura's two elderly protected cruisers, Naniwa and Takachiho, were approaching from the south. Their arrival allowed Kamimura to pursue Jessen with all of his armored cruisers while the two new arrivals dealt with Rurik. They fought a running battle with the Russians for the next hour and a half; scoring enough hits on them to force their speed down to 15 knots (28 km/h; 17 mph). Azuma's engines again broke down during this chase and Tokiwa assumed her place in the line. The Japanese closed to a minimum of about 5,000 meters (5,500 yd), but Kamimura then opened the range up to 6,500 meters (7,100 yd).

About 10:00, Kamimura's gunnery officer erroneously informed him that Izumo had expended three-quarters of her ammunition and he turned back after a five-minute rapid-fire barrage. He did not wish to leave the Tsushima Strait unguarded and thought that he could use his remaining ammunition on Rurik. By this time she had been sunk by Naniwa and Takachiho. They had radioed Kamimura that she was sunk, but he did not receive the message. Shortly after the Japanese turned back, Gromoboi and Rossia were forced to heave-to to make repairs. None of the Japanese ships were seriously damaged and Tokiwa only suffered three men wounded during the battle. After the battle the cruiser was transferred to Rear Admiral Uryū Sotokichi's command who began a blockade of Shanghai on 20 August where the Russian cruiser Askold and a destroyer had taken refuge after the Battle of the Yellow Sea. He returned home on 8 September after the Chinese government formally interned the Russian ships.

In mid-September, Tokiwa and Iwate were transferred to the 1st Division. In November the cruiser was sent to the Kure Naval Arsenal to refit. The ship was reassigned to the 2nd Division after the refit, which was ordered north to Wonsan on 2 February to escort the occupation force there. Tokiwa was ordered home on 12 February for another refit. On 13 April, the 2nd Division, including the armored cruisers Izumo and Kasuga, sailed to escort minelayers as they laid 715 mines off Vladivostok.

==== Battle of Tsushima ====
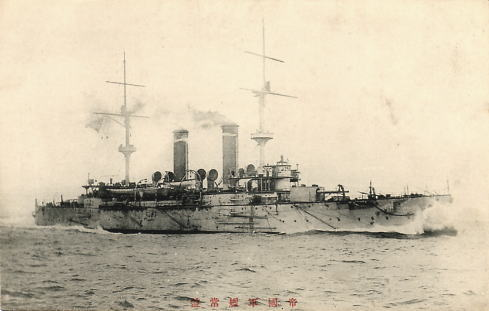
Japanese postcard of Tokiwa at speed, circa 1905

As the Russian 2nd and 3rd Pacific Squadrons approached Japan on 27 May, having sailed from the Baltic Sea, they were spotted by patrolling Japanese ships early that morning, but visibility was limited and radio reception poor. The preliminary reports were enough to cause Tōgō to order his ships to put to sea and the 2nd Division spotted the Russian ships under the command of Vice Admiral Zinovy Rozhestvensky at around 11:30. Kamimura closed to about a range of 8,000 meters (8,700 yd) before sheering off under fire to join Tōgō's battleships. Tokiwa was third in line of six when Tōgō opened fire on the 2nd Pacific Squadron at 14:10 and, like most of the ships in the division, engaged the battleship Oslyabya which was forced to fall out of formation at 14:50 and sank 20 minutes later. By this time the Russian formation was in disorder and Knyaz Suvorov suddenly appeared out of the mist at 15:35 at a range of about 2,000 meters (6,600 ft). All of Kamimura's ships engaged her for five minutes or so with Azuma and the armored cruiser Yakumo also firing torpedoes at the Russian ship without effect.

After 17:30 Kamimura led his division in a fruitless pursuit of some of the Russian cruisers, leaving Tōgō's battleships to their own devices. He abandoned his chase around 18:03 and turned northwards to rejoin Tōgō. His ships spotted the rear of the Russian battleline around 18:30 and opened fire when the range closed to 8,000–9,000 meters (8,700–9,800 yd). Nothing is known of any effect on the Russians and they ceased fire by 19:30 and rejoined Tōgō at 20:08 as night was falling. The surviving Russian ships were spotted the next morning and the Japanese ships opened fire around 10:30, staying beyond the range at which the Russian ships could effectively reply. Rear Admiral Nikolai Nebogatov therefore decided to surrender his ships as he could neither return fire nor close the range. Over the course of the battle, Tokiwa was struck by one large and seven small shells, mostly 75-millimeter. They caused only minor damage, but killed one crewman and wounded fourteen.

Captain Imai Kanemasa assumed command of the ship on 14 June, as Tōgō was reorganizing the fleet for future operations. As the IJN was preparing to invade Sakhalin Island in early July, Kamimura's 2nd Division, now reduced to Iwate, Izumo, and Tokiwa, was tasked to defend the Korea Strait before it escorted troops that made an amphibious landing in northeastern Korea. In mid-August, the division covered the landing at Chongjin, closer to the Russian border. In 1910, Tokiwa's boilers were replaced by Miyabara water-tube boilers and her six-inch guns were replaced by Japanese-built models. In December 1911, Iwate and Tokiwa were deployed to Port Arthur to keep order there during the 1911 Revolution.

=== World War I ===
The ship participated in the early stages of the Battle of Tsingtao before returning to Sasebo on 2 October 1914. The following month, Tokiwa was deployed to Singapore preparatory to searching for the German commerce raider Emden, but the German ship was sunk before the mission began. The cruiser was assigned to the Training Squadron on 1 September 1916 preparatory to her departure on 5 April 1917 with Yakumo on a training cruise to ports in California, Hawaii and the South Sea Islands with cadets from the 44th class of the Imperial Japanese Naval Academy. After her return on 17 August, the ship was relieved of her assignment to the Training Squadron on 25 August and sent to Honolulu, Hawaii in October to protect shipping from any German commerce raiders and to allow the US Navy to redeploy its forces to the Atlantic.

Tokiwa was reassigned to the Training Squadron on 10 August 1918 and returned home to prepare for her next training cruise, together with Azuma, that began on 1 March 1919 for South Asia and Australia and again on 24 November 1919, also with Azuma, for Singapore, Southeast Asia, Suez Canal and the Mediterranean Sea. After her return on 20 May 1920, the ship was relieved of her assignment to the Training Squadron on 4 June. Tokiwa was reclassified as a 1st class coast-defense ship on 30 September 1921.

=== Converted into a minelayer ===
On 30 September 1922, Tokiwa began her conversion into a minelayer at the Sasebo Naval Arsenal. To accommodate her 200–300 mines, her rear 8-inch gun turret removed, as were the six 6-inch guns on the main deck. In addition, the number of light guns was reduced to two 12-pounders, although two 8 cm/40 3rd Year Type anti-aircraft (AA) guns were added. These modifications were completed in March 1924. The ship's stern suffered substantial damage in an accidental explosion in Saiki Bay on 1 August 1927 when fuzed mines were being disarmed. One mine detonated and then several others followed, killing 35 crewmen and wounding 65. Tokiwa was assigned to the reserve fleet after repairs.

Tokiwa was assigned to the 1st Fleet from January 1932 to May 1933 after the Japanese invasion of Manchuria in 1931 and patrolled northern China. From November 1937 to 1938, the ship was retrofitted with eight Kampon boilers that reduced her maximum speed to 16 knots (30 km/h; 18 mph) and her remaining torpedo tubes were removed. The space made available by these changes increased her capacity to 500 mines. With the establishment of the 4th Fleet on 15 November 1939, Tokiwa was assigned to the 18th Division, and a year later to the 19th Division under the command of Rear Admiral Kiyohide Shima together with the minelayer Okinoshima. In 1940, the ship was refitted as a training minelayer which reduced her capacity to 200-300 mines. As part of the refit, her forward 8-inch gun turret and the four amidships 6-inch guns were removed, as was one of the 8 cm/40 3rd Year Type AA guns. Her anti-aircraft armament was heavily reinforced with the addition of two single 40-millimeter (1.6 in) guns and twenty license-built Hotchkiss 25-millimeter Type 96 light AA guns in twin-gun mounts.

=== Pacific War ===
On 9 and 10 December 1941, Tokiwa and the other minelayers of the 19th Division escorted two troop transports that carried the occupation forces for Makin and Tarawa in the Gilbert Islands. In January 1942, the ship participated in Operation R (the invasion of Rabaul and Kavieng) and returned to Kwajalein Atoll afterwards. She was damaged in an air raid by American aircraft from the carrier USS Enterprise on 1 February 1942 and forced to return to Sasebo for repairs. Tokiwa returned to Truk on 14 July, and, on 19 August, was assigned to the Japanese task force sent to reoccupy Makin Atoll after the Makin Raid.

On 1 May 1943, the ship was reassigned to the Ōminato Guard District and departed Truk on 26 May in a convoy to Yokosuka that was unsuccessfully attacked by USS Salmon (SS-182) on 3 June. Tokiwa was reassigned to the 18th Escort Squadron of the 7th Fleet on 20 January 1944. Tokiwa laid thousands of mines in the waters off Okinawa in June 1944 and Yakushima in February 1945. Ironically, Tokiwa was herself mined on 14 April 1945, approximately 78 miles (126 km) off Hesaki, Kyūshū suffering moderate damage. She was later damaged again by mines laid by USAAF B-29 Superfortress bombers on 3 June 1945. At some point during the war, her armament was augmented with approximately ten 25 mm Type 96 AA guns in single mounts and 80 depth charges. In addition she was fitted with Type 3, Mark 1, Model 3 and Type 2, Mark 2, Model 1 air search radars.

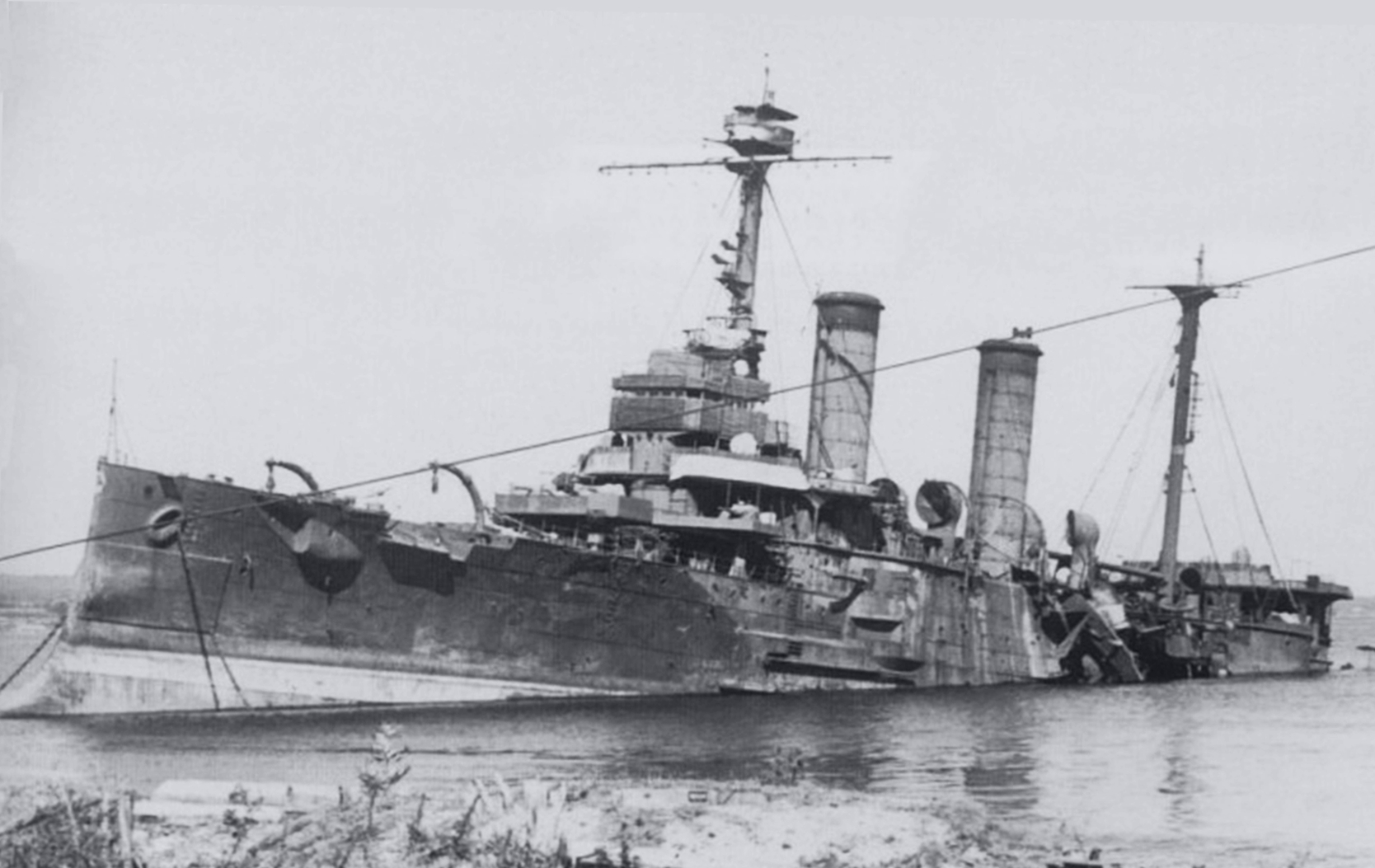
Wrecked at the end of World War II

While at Ōminato in Mutsu Bay in northern Japan at 41.20°N 141.60°E, Tokiwa was severely damaged by a direct bomb hit and four near misses in an air attack on 9 August 1945 by United States Navy aircraft from Task Force 38, and was beached by her crew. On 30 November 1945 Tokiwa was removed from the navy list. After the end of World War II, the wreck was refloated on 5 April 1947, towed to Hakodate, Hokkaidō, and scrapped from August–October 1947.

== Bibliography ==
- Brook, Peter (2000). "Armoured Cruiser vs. Armoured Cruiser: Ulsan 14 August 1904". In Preston, Antony (ed.). Warship 2000–2001. London: Conway Maritime Press. ISBN 0-85177-791-0.
- Brook, Peter (1999). Warships for Export: Armstrong Warships 1867–1927. Gravesend: World Ship Society. ISBN 0-905617-89-4.
- Burdick, Charles B. (1976). The Japanese Siege of Tsingtau: World War I in Asia. Hamden, Connecticut: Archon Books. ISBN 0-2080-1594-9.
- Campbell, N.J.M. (1978). "The Battle of Tsu-Shima, Parts 2, 3 and 4". In Preston, Antony (ed.). Warship. Vol. II. London: Conway Maritime Press. pp. 127–35, 186–192, 258–65. ISBN 0-87021-976-6.
- Chesneau, Roger, ed. (1980). Conway's All the World's Fighting Ships 1922–1946. Greenwich, UK: Conway Maritime Press. ISBN 0-85177-146-7.
- Chesneau, Roger & Kolesnik, Eugene M., eds. (1979). Conway's All the World's Fighting Ships 1860–1905. Greenwich, UK: Conway Maritime Press. ISBN 0-8317-0302-4.
- Corbett, Julian Stafford (1994). Maritime Operations in the Russo-Japanese War, 1904–1905. Annapolis, Maryland: Naval Institute Press. ISBN 1-55750-129-7.
- Dix, Charles Cabry (1905). The World's Navies in the Boxer Rebellion (China 1900). London: Digby, Long & Co. p. 307. OCLC 5716842.
- Evans, David & Peattie, Mark R. (1997). Kaigun: Strategy, Tactics, and Technology in the Imperial Japanese Navy, 1887–1941. Annapolis, Maryland: Naval Institute Press. ISBN 0-87021-192-7.
- Forczyk, Robert (2009). Russian Battleship vs Japanese Battleship, Yellow Sea 1904–05. Botley, UK: Osprey. ISBN 978-1-84603-330-8.
- Fukui, Shizuo (1991). Japanese Naval Vessels at the End of World War II. London: Greenhill Books. ISBN 1-85367-125-8.
- Hackett, Bob & Kingsepp, Sander (24 December 2011). "IJN Tokiwa: Tabular Record of Movement". FUSETSUKAN! Stories and Battle Histories of the IJN's Minelayers. Combinedfleet.com.
- Halpern, Paul S. (1994). A Naval History of World War I. Annapolis, Maryland: Naval Institute Press. ISBN 1-55750-352-4.
- Jentschura, Hansgeorg; Jung, Dieter & Mickel, Peter (1977). Warships of the Imperial Japanese Navy, 1869–1945. Annapolis, Maryland: United States Naval Institute. ISBN 0-87021-893-X.
- Kowner, Rotem (2006). Historical Dictionary of the Russo-Japanese War. Historical Dictionaries of War, Revolution, and Civil Unrest. Vol. 29. Lanham, Maryland: Scarecrow Press. ISBN 978-0-81084-927-3.
- Lacroix, Eric & Wells, Linton (1997). Japanese Cruisers of the Pacific War. Annapolis, Maryland: Naval Institute Press. ISBN 0-87021-311-3.
- Mauch, Peter (2011). Sailor Diplomat: Nomura Kichisaburō and the Japanese-American War. Cambridge, Massachusetts: Harvard University Asia Center. ISBN 978-0-674-05599-5.
- Milanovich, Kathrin (2014). "Armored Cruisers of the Imperial Japanese Navy". In Jordan, John (ed.). Warship 2014. London: Conway. ISBN 978-1-84486-236-8.
- Rohwer, Jürgen (2005). Chronology of the War at Sea 1939–1945: The Naval History of World War Two (Third Revised ed.). Annapolis, Maryland: Naval Institute Press. ISBN 1-59114-119-2.
- Saxon, Timothy D. (Winter 2000). "Anglo-Japanese Naval Cooperation, 1914–1918". Naval War College Review. LIII (1). Naval War College Press. Archived from the original on 13 December 2006.
- Silverstone, Paul H. (1984). Directory of the World's Capital Ships. New York: Hippocrene Books. ISBN 0-88254-979-0.
- Warner, Denis & Warner, Peggy (2002). The Tide at Sunrise: A History of the Russo-Japanese War, 1904–1905 (2nd ed.). London: Frank Cass. ISBN 0-7146-5256-3.
- Watts, Anthony J. & Gordon, Brian G. (1971). The Imperial Japanese Navy. Garden City, New York: Doubleday. ISBN 0385012683.
