= Asama-class cruiser =

Armored cruiser class of the Imperial Japanese Navy

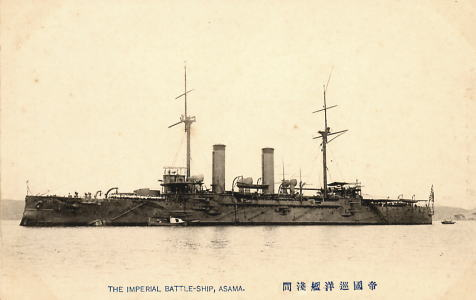
- Asama in 1900

Class overview
- Name: Asama class
- Builders: Armstrong Whitworth, United Kingdom
- Operators: Imperial Japanese Navy
- Preceded by: None
- Succeeded by: Izumo class
- Built: 1897–1899
- In commission: 1899–1945
- Completed: 2
- Lost: 1
- Scrapped: 2

General characteristics
- Type: Armored cruiser
- Displacement: 9,514–9,557 long tons (9,667–9,710 t)
- Length: 442 ft 0 in (134.72 m) (o/a)
- Beam: 67 ft 2 in (20.48 m)
- Draft: 24 ft 3 in – 24 ft 5 in (7.4–7.43 m)
- Installed power: 18,000 ihp (13,000 kW); 12 Cylindrical boilerss
- Propulsion: 2 Shafts; 2 triple-expansion steam engines
- Speed: 21 knots (39 km/h; 24 mph)
- Range: 10,000 nmi (19,000 km; 12,000 mi) at 10 knots (19 km/h; 12 mph)
- Complement: 676
- Armament: 2 × twin 20.3 cm/45 Type 41 naval guns; 14 × single QF 6 inch /40 naval guns; 12 × single QF 12 pounder 12 cwt naval guns; 8 × single QF 3 pounder Hotchkiss guns; 5 × single 457 mm (18.0 in) torpedo tubes
- Armor: Waterline belt: 89–178 mm (3.5–7.0 in); Deck: 51 mm (2.0 in); Gun Turret: 160 mm (6.3 in); Barbette: 152 mm (6.0 in); Casemate: 51–152 mm (2.0–6.0 in); Conning tower: 356 mm (14.0 in); Bulkhead: 127 mm (5.0 in)

The Asama-class cruisers (浅間型装甲巡洋艦, Asama-gata sōkōjun'yōkan) were a pair of armored cruisers built for the Imperial Japanese Navy (IJN) in the late 1890s. As Japan lacked the industrial capacity to build such warships itself, the ships were built in Britain. They were part of the "Six-Six Fleet" expansion program that began after the defeat of China during the First Sino-Japanese War of 1894–95. Between them, the sister ships participated in all four main naval battles of the Russo-Japanese War of 1904–05—the Battle of Port Arthur, the Battle off Ulsan, the Battle of the Yellow Sea, and the Battle of Tsushima—but played a much more minor role in World War I. Asama ran aground while searching for German commerce raiders in early 1915 and was under repair for the next two years. Tokiwa participated in the Battle of Tsingtao (1914) and also searched for commerce raiders. Both ships made training cruises during the war and continued to do so after 1918.

Asama continued to make training cruises until she ran aground again in 1935, after which she became a stationary training ship for the rest of her career. Tokiwa, converted into a minelayer in 1922–24, was placed in reserve in 1927 after an accidental explosion of several mines damaged her. The ship became a training minelayer in 1940. During the Pacific War of 1941-1945, Tokiwa participated in the occupation of the Gilbert Islands (1941) and Rabaul and Kavieng (1942) in New Guinea. Damaged by American aircraft shortly afterwards, the ship was forced to return to Japan for repairs. Tokiwa laid minefields during 1944–45 until she was twice damaged by mines in 1945. Shortly before the end of the war, American aircraft inflicted heavy damage on the ship and her crew had to beach her. Tokiwa was salvaged in 1947 and subsequently broken up for scrap. Asama survived the war intact and was scrapped in 1946–47.

== Background and design ==
The 1896 Naval Expansion Plan was made after the First Sino-Japanese War of 1894–95 and included four armored cruisers in addition to four more battleships, all of which had to be ordered from foreign shipyards as Japan lacked the capability to build them itself. Further consideration of the Russian building program caused the IJN to believe that the battleships ordered under the original plan would not be sufficient to counter the Imperial Russian Navy. Budgetary limitations prevented ordering more battleships and the IJN decided to expand the number of more affordable armored cruisers to be ordered from four to six ships. The revised plan is commonly known as the "Six-Six Fleet". These ships were purchased using the £30,000,000 indemnity paid by China after losing the First Sino-Japanese War. Unlike most of their contemporaries which were designed for commerce raiding or to defend colonies and trade routes, these cruisers was intended as fleet scouts and to be employed in the battleline.

In June 1896, Sir Andrew Noble, then in Japan, telegraphed Armstrong Whitworth to lay down two stock cruisers. Work then began on a preliminary design based on an improved version of the earlier Chilean cruiser O'Higgins. Several iterations of the design were made before the IJN approved the final design on 21 August. This was over 1,000 long tons (1,016 t) larger, more heavily armed, and slightly faster the Chilean armored cruiser. The first ship of the class was laid down in October although the Japanese did not order the ships until 6 July 1897.

== Description ==
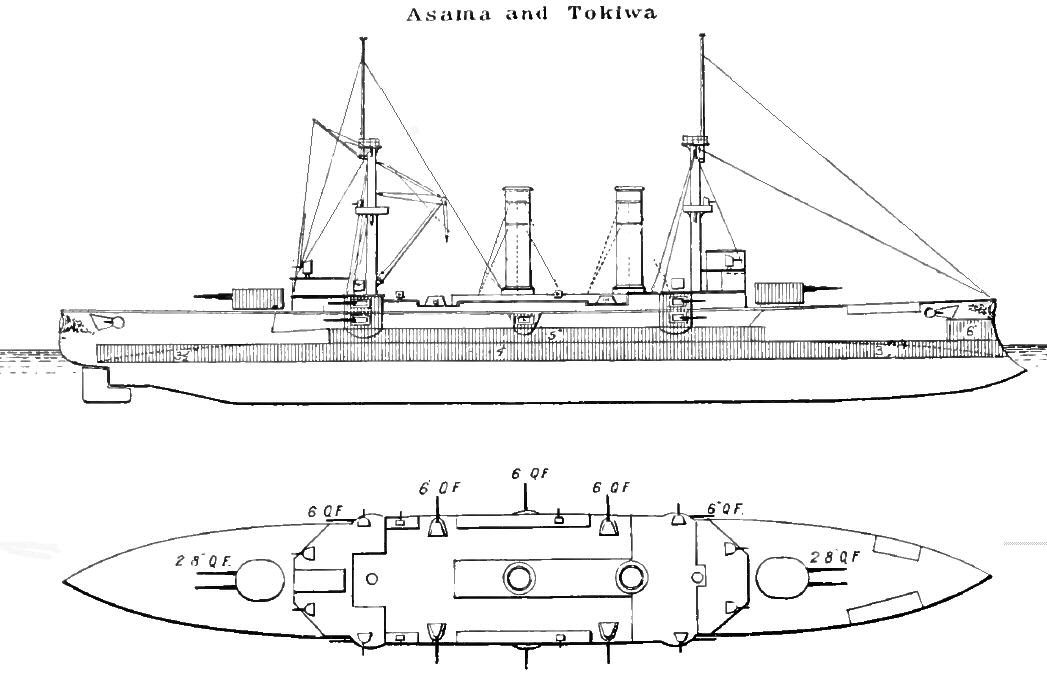
Right elevation and plan line drawing from Brassey's Naval Annual 1902

The ships were 442 feet 0 inches (134.72 m) long overall and 408 feet 0 inches (124.36 m) between perpendiculars. They had a beam of 20.48 meters (67 ft 2 in) and had an average draft of 24 feet 3 inches – 24 feet 5 inches (7.40–7.43 m). The sisters displaced 9,514–9,557 long tons (9,667–9,710 t) at normal load and 10,311–10,353 long tons (10,476–10,519 t) at deep load. The ships had metacentric heights of 2 feet 9 inches – 2 feet 11 inches (0.85–0.88 m). Their crew consisted of 676 officers and enlisted men.

The Asama-class ships had two 4-cylinder vertical triple-expansion steam engines, built by Humphrys, Tennant, each driving a single propeller shaft. Steam for the engines was provided by a dozen cylindrical boilers and the engines were rated at a total of 18,000 indicated horsepower (13,000 kW). The ships had a designed speed of 22 knots (41 km/h; 25 mph) and exceeded that speed during their sea trials, reaching 22.07–23.1 knots (40.87–42.78 km/h; 25.40–26.58 mph) from 19,000–19,040 ihp (14,170–14,200 kW). They carried up to 1,390 long tons (1,410 t) of coal and could steam for 10,000 nautical miles (19,000 km; 12,000 mi) at a speed of 10 knots (19 km/h; 12 mph).

=== Armament ===
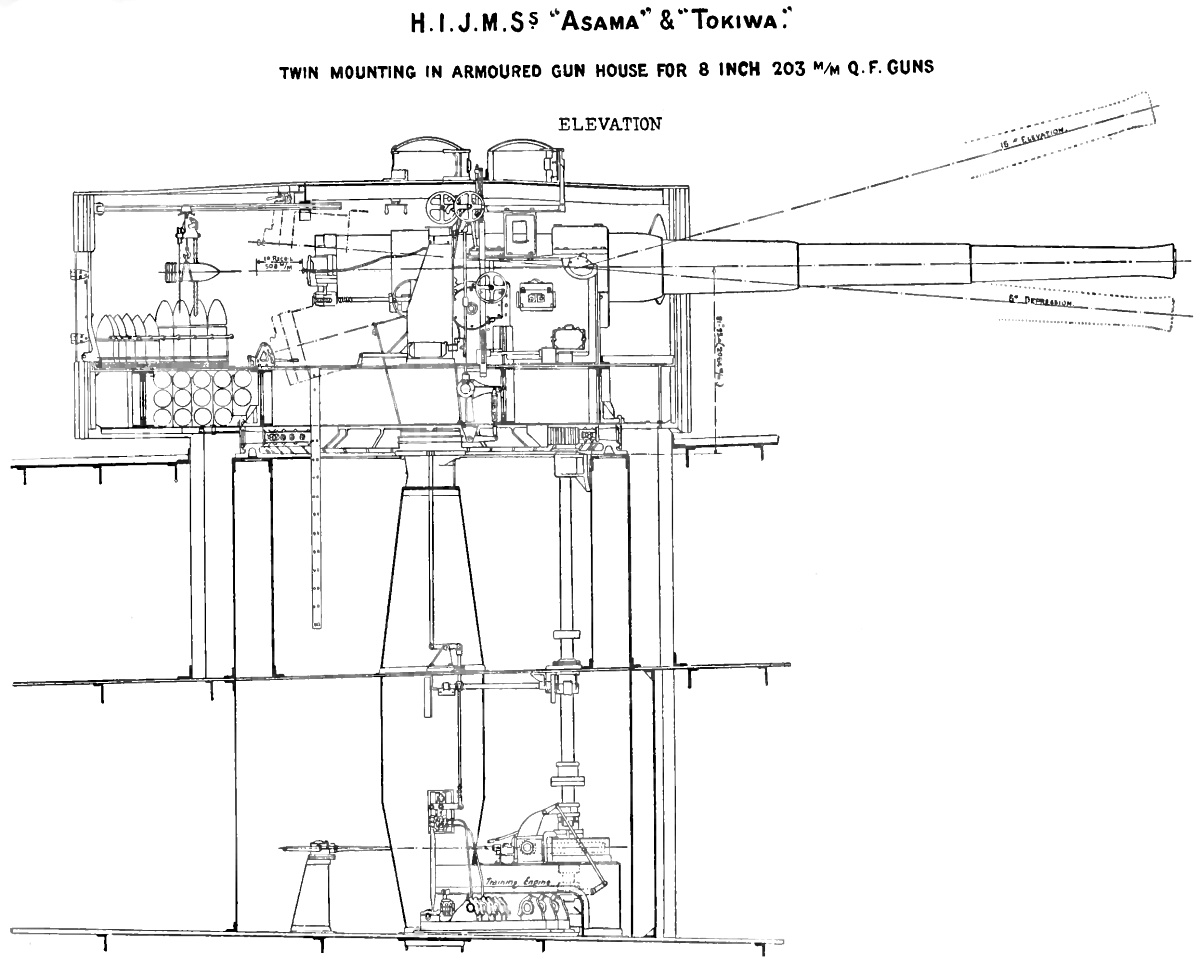
Cross-section of the eight-inch gun turret used by all the "Six-Six Fleet" armored cruisers

The main armament for all of the "Six-Six Fleet" armored cruisers was four Armstrong Whitworth-built 45-caliber eight-inch guns in twin-gun turrets fore and aft of the superstructure. The electrically operated turrets were capable of 130° rotation left and right, and the guns could be elevated to +30° and depressed to −5°. The turret accommodated 65 shells, but could only be reloaded through doors in the turret floor and the ship's deck that allowed the electric winch in the turret to hoist shells up from the shell room deep in the hull. A total of 120 shells were carried for each gun. The guns were manually loaded and had a rate of fire about 1.2 rounds per minute. The 203-millimeter gun fired 250-pound (113.5 kg) armor-piercing (AP) projectiles at a muzzle velocity of 2,500 feet per second (760 m/s) to a range of 13,200 yards (12,100 m).

The secondary armament consisted of fourteen Elswick Ordnance Company "Pattern Z" quick-firing (QF), 40-caliber, six-inch (152 mm) guns. All but four of these guns were mounted in armored casemates on the main and upper decks, and their mounts on the upper deck were protected by gun shields. Their 100-pound (45.4 kg) AP shells were fired at a muzzle velocity of 2,300 feet per second (700 m/s). Each gun was provided with total of 150 shells per gun. The ships were also equipped with a dozen 40-caliber QF 12-pounder 12-cwt guns (Note: "Cwt" is the abbreviation for hundredweight, 12 cwt referring to the weight of the gun.) and eight QF 2.5-pounder Yamauchi guns as close-range defense against torpedo boats. The former gun fired three-inch (76 mm), 12.5-pound (5.7 kg) projectiles at a muzzle velocity of 2,359 feet per second (719 m/s).

The Asama-class ships were equipped with five submerged 18-inch (457 mm) torpedo tubes, two on each broadside, and one above water in the bow. The Type 30 torpedo had a 100-kilogram (220 lb) warhead and three range/speed settings: 870 yards (800 m) at 27 knots (50 km/h; 31 mph), 1,100 yards (1,000 m) at 23.6 knots (43.7 km/h; 27.2 mph) or 3,300 yards (3,000 m) at 14.2 knots (26.3 km/h; 16.3 mph).

=== Protection ===
All of the "Six-Six Fleet" armored cruisers used the same armor scheme with some minor differences, with the Asama class using Harvey armor. The waterline belt ran the full length of the ships and its thickness varied from 7.0 inches (178 mm) amidships to 3.5 inches (89 mm) at the bow and stern. The thickest part of the belt covered the middle of the ship for a length of 284 feet 2 inches (86.62 m). It had a height of 7 feet 0 inches (2.13 m), of which 4 feet 11 inches to 5 feet 0 inches (1.51 to 1.52 m) was normally underwater. The upper strake of belt armor was 5.0 inches (127 mm) thick and extended from the upper edge of the waterline belt to the main deck. It extended 214 feet 8 inches (65.42 m) from the forward to the rear barbette. The Asama-class ships had a single transverse 5-inch armored bulkhead that closed off the forward end of the central armored citadel.

The barbettes, gun turrets and the front of the casemates were all 6 inches thick while the sides and rear of the casemates were protected by 51 millimeters (2.0 in) of armor. The above-water torpedo tube in the bow was enclosed by a 23-by-9-foot (7.0 by 2.7 m) patch of 6-inch armor. The armor protecting the conning tower was 356 millimeters (14.0 in) in thickness. In addition to the Harvey armor, the Asama-class ships were unique among the "Six-Six Fleet" cruisers in that their armored deck was 51 millimeters (2.0 in) thick. The ships had 32 watertight compartments in their double bottom and an additional 131 between the bottom and the upper deck.

== Ships ==
Construction data
Ship	Builder	Laid down	Launched	Completed
Asama	Armstrong Whitworth, Elswick	20 October 1896	22 March 1898	8 February 1899
Tokiwa	Armstrong Whitworth, Elswick	6 January 1897	6 July 1898	18 April 1899

== Service ==
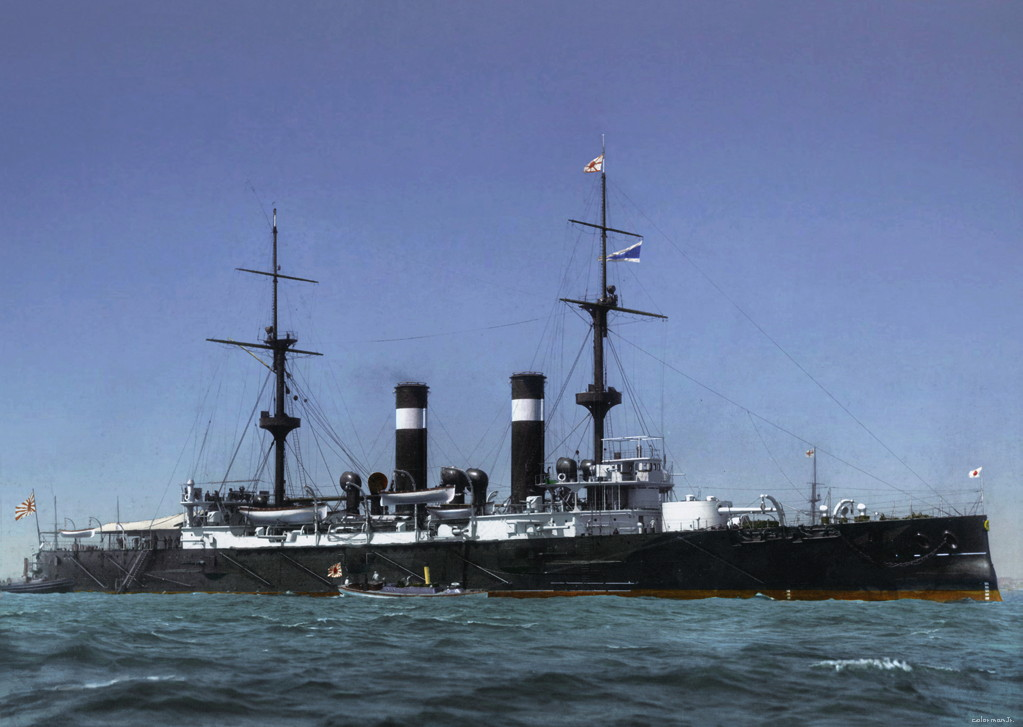
A colorized photo of Asama at anchor, Plymouth, 1902

Before the start of the Russo-Japanese War in 1904, Tokiwa supported Japanese forces during the Boxer Rebellion in China while Asama participated in the Coronation Review for King Edward VII in 1902.

=== Russo-Japanese War ===
At the beginning of the Russo-Japanese War the sisters were assigned to the 2nd Division of the 2nd Fleet, although Asama was attached to the 4th Division of Rear Admiral Uryū Sotokichi for operations near Seoul, Korea. Just before the war began, the ship escorted Japanese troop convoys to Chemulpo, Seoul's port on the west coast, and helped to sink the two Russian warships stationed there on the first day of the war. Tokiwa participated in the Battle of Port Arthur that same day, when Vice Admiral Tōgō Heihachirō led the Combined Fleet in an attack on the Russian ships of the Pacific Squadron anchored just outside Port Arthur. Tōgō had expected the earlier surprise night attack by his destroyers to be much more successful than it was, anticipating that the Russians would be badly disorganized and weakened, but they had recovered from their surprise and were ready for his attack.

In early March Tokiwa was reassigned to the 3rd Division and Asama joined her shortly afterwards. They participated in the action of 13 April when Tōgō successfully lured out two battleships of the Russian Pacific Squadron. During this action, the sisters engaged the Russian cruisers that preceded the battleships before falling back on Tōgō's battleships. When the Russians spotted the five battleships of the 1st Division, they turned back for Port Arthur and the battleship Petropavlovsk struck a minefield laid by the Japanese the previous night. The ship sank in less than two minutes after one of her magazines exploded.

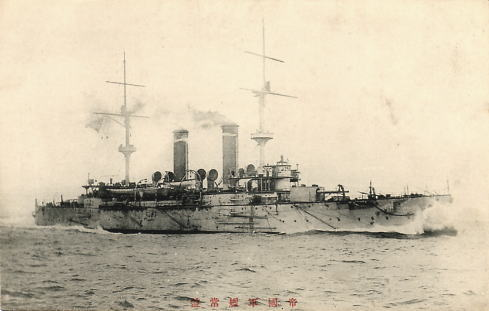
A postcard of Tokiwa at sea, c. 1904

Tokiwa rejoined the 2nd Division a few days later and the division was tasked to contain the Russian armored cruisers based at Vladivostok. It failed to do so until 13 August when the latter tried to rendezvous with the ships that attempted to breakout from Port Arthur. Unbeknownst to the Russians, Tōgō had defeated the ships from Port Arthur during the Battle of the Yellow Sea on 10 August and the Russian squadron from Vladivostok was intercepted off Ulsan, Korea by the 2nd Division. The steering of the Russian cruiser Rurik was damaged early in the battle and the Russians made several attempts to prevent the Japanese from concentrating fire on her, but were ultimately forced to abandon her to her fate. Kamimura left Rurik to the tender ministrations of his reinforcements and pursued the two remaining Russian ships for a time before breaking off pursuit prematurely based on an incorrect report that his flagship had expended most of her ammunition. Tokiwa only suffered three men wounded during the battle.

In the meantime, Asama remained on blockade duty off Port Arthur and participated in a minor way in the Battle of the Yellow Sea. She was coaling when the Pacific Squadron sortied and took some time to intercept the Russian ships. The battle was almost over by then and the ship only engaged them for the last hour or so of the battle. After the battle, the sisters were refitted and assigned to different units, escorting troop convoys to northern Korea and blockading the Tsugaru Strait until the Russian ships from the Baltic Fleet approached Japan in mid-1905.

==== Battle of Tsushima ====
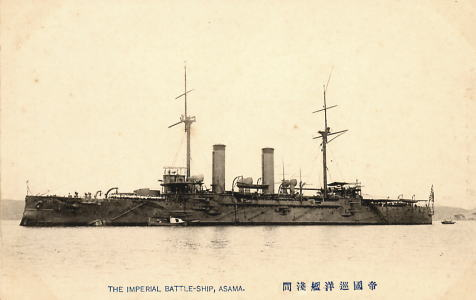
A Japanese postcard of Asama at anchor, after 1904

The Russian 2nd and 3rd Pacific Squadrons were spotted on the morning on 27 May 1905 and Tōgō ordered his ships to put to sea. Asama and Tokiwa were assigned to the 2nd Division in anticipation of this battle and Kamimura's ships confirmed the initial spotting later that morning before joining Tōgō's battleships. Together with most of the Japanese battleships, the division opened fire at 14:10 on the Russian battleship Oslyabya. Shortly afterwards, Asama was damaged by a shell that knocked out her steering that forced her to fall out of formation. Around 15:35, the Russian battleship Knyaz Suvorov suddenly appeared out of the mist at short range. Kamimura's ships engaged her for five minutes before she disappeared back into the mists. Asama rejoined the division at 15:50, but further hits caused serious flooding that again caused her to fall out of formation about 20 minutes later. She finally caught up to the division at 17:05. Shortly afterwards, Kamimura led his division in a fruitless pursuit of some of the Russian cruisers around 17:30. He abandoned his chase around 18:03 and encountered the Russian battleline about a half-hour later. He stayed at long range and his ships fired when practicable before ceasing fire at 19:30.

The surviving Russian ships were spotted the next morning and the Japanese ships opened fire and stayed beyond the range at which the Russian ships could effectively reply. Rear Admiral Nikolai Nebogatov therefore decided to surrender his ships as he could neither return fire nor close the range. During the battle, Asama was struck by about a dozen shells that killed 11 men and wounded 13 more. In contrast, Tokiwa was struck by eight shells that caused only minor damage, but killed 1 crewman and wounded 14. After the battle, the division covered amphibious landings in northeastern Korea in July and August before the war ended.

=== Subsequent service ===
In 1910–11 and 1914, Asama served as a training ship, making cruises with naval cadets to North and Central American and Hawaii, among other destinations. After the start of World War I in August 1914, she was assigned to search for Vice Admiral Maximilian von Spee's German East Asia Squadron in the South Sea Islands. In late October, the ship was ordered to blockade a German gunboat in Honolulu, Hawaii before she was assigned to the American Expeditionary Squadron, the Japanese component of a joint Anglo-Japanese command to protect shipping of the western coast of the Americas, off the Mexican coast after the gunboat was interned in early November. The squadron then spent the next several months for German commerce raiders.

While entering Puerto San Bartolomé in Baja California in early 1915, Asama struck an uncharted rock and was badly damaged. It took months to refloat her and to make her partially seaworthy. The ship was given temporary repairs at the British naval base at Esquimalt, British Columbia, before arriving back in Japan in December where permanent repairs were not completed until March 1917. Asama was assigned to the Training Squadron later that year and made another cadet training cruise in 1918.

Tokiwa supported Japanese forces during the Battle of Tsingtao before returning to Sasebo in October 1914. She was assigned to the Training Squadron in 1916 in preparation for a training cruise that she made the following year. After arriving home, the ship was deployed to Hawaii in October 1917 to protect shipping from German commerce raiders and to allow the US Navy to redeploy its forces to the Atlantic. Tokiwa made two more cruises in 1919–20 before she began conversion into a minelayer in 1922–24. To accommodate her 200–300 mines, her rear 8-inch gun turret removed, as were the six 6-inch guns on the main deck. In addition, the number of light guns was reduced to two 12-pounders, although two 8 cm/40 3rd Year Type anti-aircraft (AA) guns were added. The gun had a maximum elevation of +75 degrees, and could fire a 3-inch, 12.5 lb (5.67 kg) projectile with a muzzle velocity of 2,200 ft/s (680 m/s) to a maximum height of 23,600 feet (7,200 m).

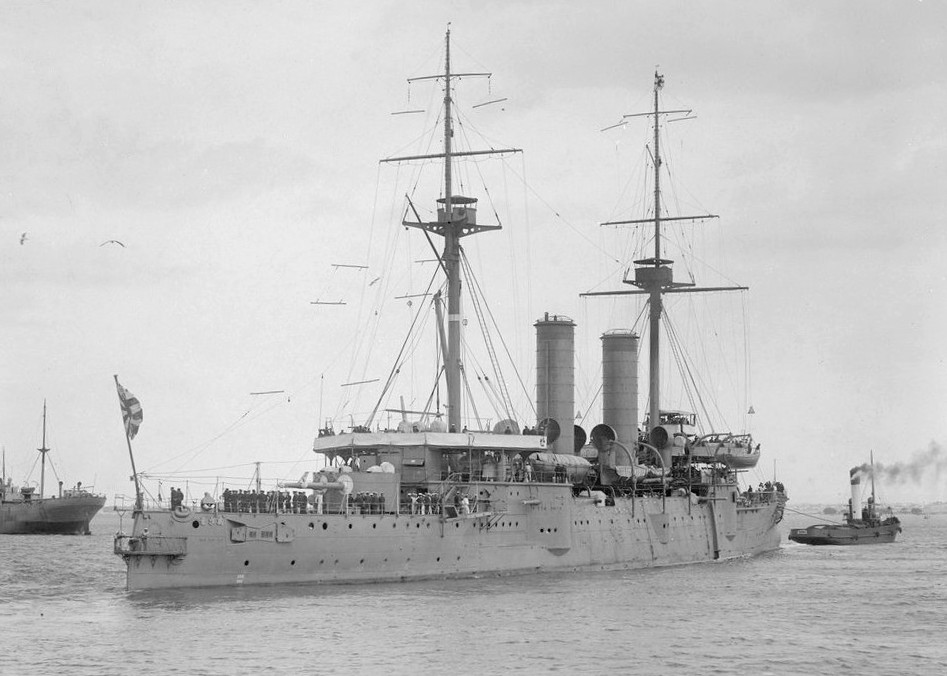
Asama being towed to sea off Australia, between 1923 and 1935

Asama made a training cruise in 1921 before her armament was modified in 1922. All of her main deck guns, six 6-inch and four 12-pounder guns, were removed and their casemates plated over. In addition all of her QF 2.5-pounder guns were removed and a single 8 cm/40 3rd Year Type AA gun was added. After the refit, she resumed her training cruises, generally at two-year intervals, until she ran aground in 1935. The damage to her bottom was severe enough that the IJN decided to make her a stationary training ship in 1938.

Tokiwa's stern was badly damaged in an accidental explosion 1927 when fuzed mines were being disarmed. One mine detonated and then several others followed, killing 35 crewmen and wounding 65. The ship was assigned to the reserve fleet after repairs. She patrolled Chinese waters after the Japanese invasion of Manchuria in 1931. In 1937–38, Tokiwa was retrofitted with eight Kampon water-tube boilers that reduced her maximum speed to 16 knots (30 km/h; 18 mph) and her remaining torpedo tubes were removed. The space made available by these changes increased her capacity to 500 mines. In 1940, the ship was refitted as a training minelayer which reduced her capacity to 200-300 mines. As part of the refit, her forward 8-inch gun turret and the four amidships 6-inch guns were removed, as was one of the 8 cm/40 3rd Year Type AA guns. Her anti-aircraft armament was heavily reinforced with the addition of two single 40-millimeter (1.6 in) guns and twenty license-built Hotchkiss 25-millimeter Type 96 light AA guns in twin-gun mounts. The 25 mm (0.98 in) weapon was the standard Japanese light anti-aircraft gun during World War II, but it suffered from severe design shortcomings that rendered it a largely ineffective weapon. The twin and triple mounts lacked sufficient speed in train or elevation; the gun sights were unable to handle fast targets; the gun exhibited excessive vibration; the magazine was too small and, finally, the gun produced excessive muzzle blast. The weapon had a maximum range of 24,600 feet (7,500 m), but effective range was only about 4,900–9,800 feet (1,500–3,000 m).

=== The Pacific War ===
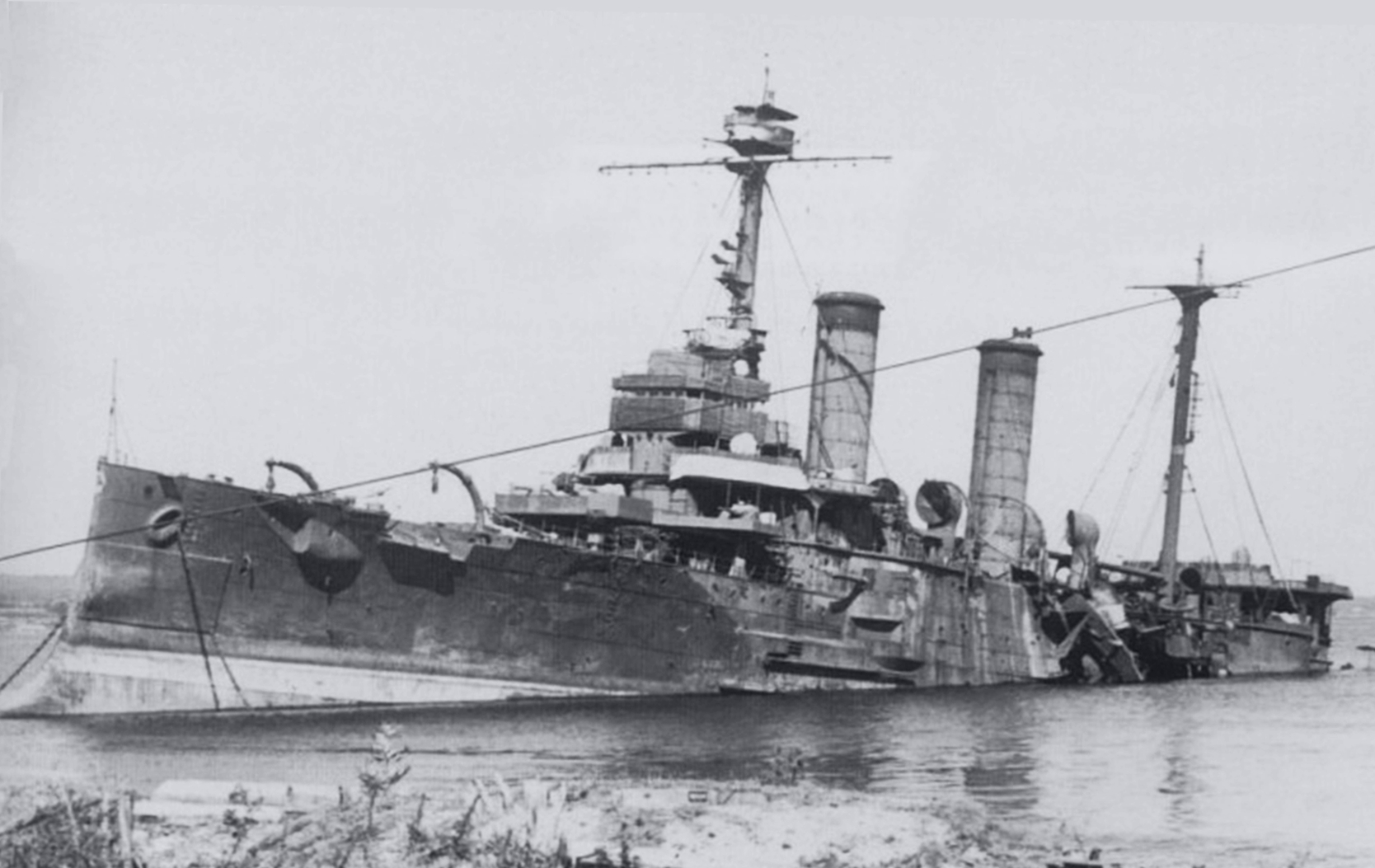
Tokiwa's wreck at the end of World War II

A few days after the attack on Pearl Harbor, Tokiwa and the other minelayers of the 19th Division of the 4th Fleet escorted two troop transports that carried the occupation forces for the Gilbert Islands. In January 1942, the ship participated in Operation R (the invasion of Rabaul and Kavieng) and returned to Kwajalein Atoll afterwards. She was damaged by American carrier aircraft in February 1942 and forced to return home for repairs. Tokiwa returned to Truk on 14 July, and reoccupied Makin Atoll the following month after the Makin Raid.

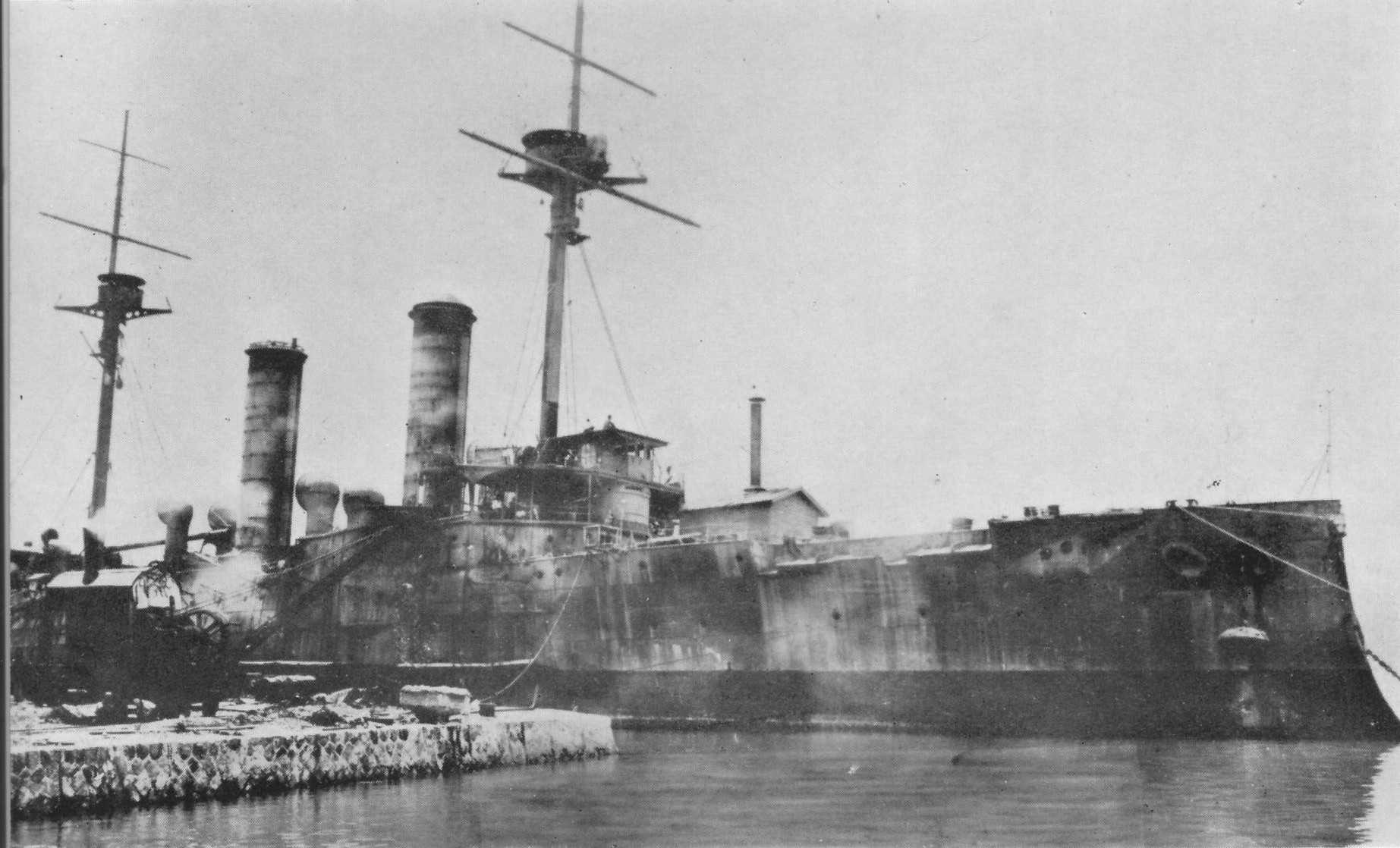
Asama on 25 August 1946

The ship returned home in 1943 and began to lay defensive minefields in 1944. She was moderately damaged by a mine in April 1945 and struck an American mine two months later. By this time, her armament had been augmented with approximately ten 25 mm Type 96 AA guns in single mounts and 80 depth charges. In addition Tokiwa was fitted with Type 3, Mark 1, Model 3 and Type 2, Mark 2, Model 1 air search radars. While in northern Japan a few days before the end of the war, Tokiwa was severely damaged by American carrier aircraft and had to be beached by her crew lest she sink.

Asama was reclassified as a training ship in 1942 and became a gunnery training ship later that year. She was disarmed at some point during the war, only retaining several 8 cm/40 3rd Year Type anti-aircraft guns. The ship survived the war intact and she and Tokiwa were stricken from the navy list in November 1945. Asama was scrapped in 1946–47 while Tokiwa was refloated in 1947 and scrapped that same year.
