= Japanese cruiser Asama =

Asama-class cruiser

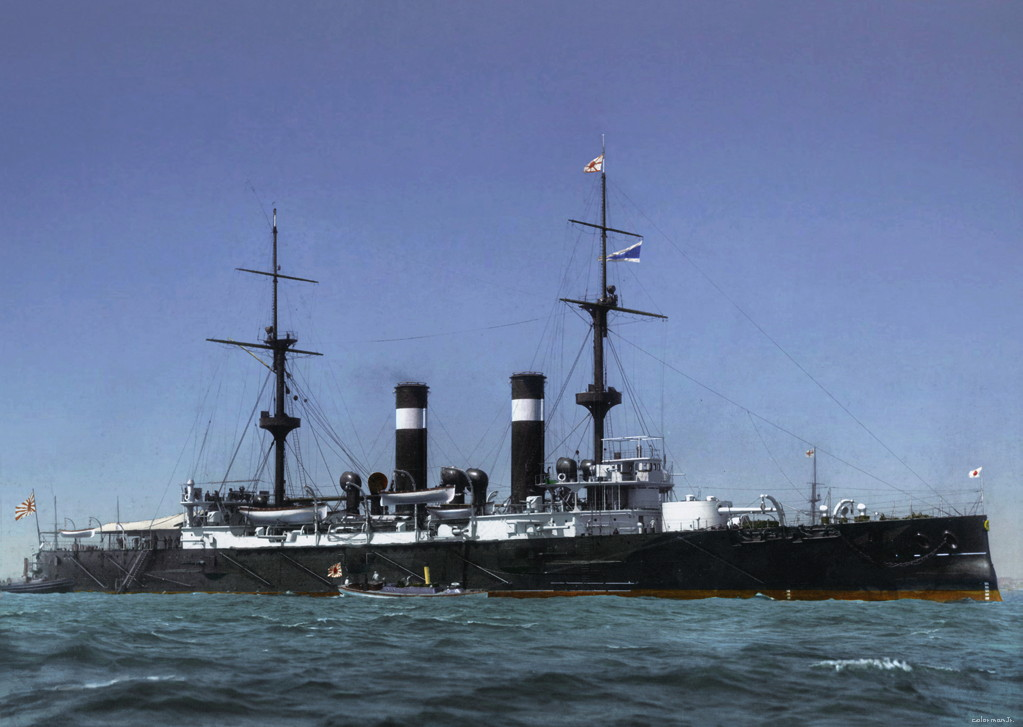
- A colorized photo of Asama at anchor, Plymouth, 1902

History

Empire of Japan
- Name: Asama
- Namesake: Mount Asama
- Awarded: 6 July 1897
- Builder: Armstrong Whitworth, United Kingdom
- Laid down: 20 October 1896
- Launched: 21 March 1898
- Completed: 18 March 1899
- Decommissioned: 30 November 1945
- Reclassified: As 1st class coast-defense ship, 1 September 1921; As training ship, July 1942
- Fate: Scrapped, 1947

General characteristics
- Class & type: Asama-class armored cruiser
- Displacement: 9,710 t (9,560 long tons)
- Length: 134.72 m (442 ft) (o/a)
- Beam: 20.48 m (67 ft 2 in)
- Draft: 7.43 m (24 ft 5 in)
- Installed power: 12 cylindrical boilers; 18,000 ihp (13,000 kW)
- Propulsion: 2 shafts; 2 triple-expansion steam engines
- Speed: 21 knots (39 km/h; 24 mph)
- Range: 10,000 nmi (19,000 km; 12,000 mi) at 10 knots (19 km/h; 12 mph)
- Complement: 676
- Armament: 2 × twin 20.3 cm/45 Type 41 naval guns; 14 × single QF 6 inch /40 naval guns; 12 × single QF 12 pounder 12 cwt naval guns; 8 × single QF 3 pounder Hotchkiss guns; 5 × 457 mm (18 in) torpedo tubes
- Armor: Waterline belt: 89–178 mm (3.5–7.0 in); Deck: 51 mm (2 in); Gun Turret: 160 mm (6.3 in); Barbette: 152 mm (6 in); Casemate: 51–152 mm (2–6 in); Conning tower: 356 mm (14 in); Bulkhead: 127 mm (5 in)

Asama (淺間) was the lead ship of her class of armored cruisers (Sōkō jun'yōkan) built for the Imperial Japanese Navy (IJN) in the late 1890s. As Japan lacked the industrial capacity to build such warships herself, the ship was built in Britain. She served in the Russo-Japanese War of 1904–05 during which she participated in the Battle of Chemulpo Bay and the Battle of the Yellow Sea without damage, although her luck did not hold out during the Battle of Tsushima. Early in World War I, Asama unsuccessfully searched for German commerce raiders until she was severely damaged when she ran aground off the Mexican coast in early 1915. Repairs took over two years to complete and she was mainly used as a training ship for the rest of her career. The ship made a total of 12 training cruises before she was crippled after running aground again in 1935. Asama then became a stationary training ship until she was broken up in 1946–1947.

== Background and description ==
The 1896 Naval Expansion Plan was made after the First Sino-Japanese War and included four armored cruisers in addition to four more battleships, all of which had to be ordered from British shipyards as Japan lacked the capability to build them itself. Further consideration of the Russian building program caused the IJN to believe that the battleships ordered under the original plan would not be sufficient to counter the Imperial Russian Navy. Budgetary limitations prevented ordering more battleships and the IJN decided to expand the number of more affordable armored cruisers to be ordered from four to six ships. The revised plan is commonly known as the "Six-Six Fleet". Unlike most of their contemporaries which were designed for commerce raiding or to defend colonies and trade routes, Asama and her half-sisters were intended as fleet scouts and to be employed in the battleline.

The ship was 134.72 meters (442 ft) long overall and 124.36 meters (408 ft) between perpendiculars. She had a beam of 20.48 meters (67 ft 2 in) and had an average draft of 7.43 meters (24 ft 5 in). Asama displaced 9,710 metric tons (9,560 long tons) at normal load and 10,519 metric tons (10,353 long tons) at deep load. The ship had a metacentric height of 0.85 meters (2 ft 9 in). Her crew consisted of 676 officers and enlisted men.

Asama had two 4-cylinder triple-expansion steam engines, each driving a single propeller shaft. Steam for the engines was provided by a dozen cylindrical boilers and the engines were rated at a total of 18,000 indicated horsepower (13,000 kW). The ship had a designed speed of 22 knots (41 km/h; 25 mph) and reached 22.07 knots (40.9 km/h; 25.4 mph) during her sea trials from 19,000 ihp (14,000 kW). She carried up to 1,390 long tons (1,410 t) of coal and could steam for 10,000 nautical miles (19,000 km; 12,000 mi) at a speed of 10 knots (19 km/h; 12 mph).

The main armament for all of the "Six-Six Fleet" armored cruisers was four eight-inch guns in twin-gun turrets fore and aft of the superstructure. The secondary armament consisted of 14 Elswick Ordnance Company "Pattern Z" quick-firing (QF), 6-inch (152 mm) guns. Only four of these guns were not mounted in armored casemates on the main and upper decks and their mounts on the upper deck were protected by gun shields. Asama was also equipped with a dozen QF 12-pounder 12-cwt guns (Note: "Cwt" is the abbreviation for hundredweight, 12 cwt referring to the weight of the gun.) and eight QF 2.5-pounder Yamauchi guns as close-range defense against torpedo boats. The ship was equipped with five 457 mm (18 in) torpedo tubes, one above water in the bow and four submerged tubes, two on each broadside.

All of the "Six-Six Fleet" armored cruisers used the same armor scheme with some minor differences, of which the most important was that the two Asama-class ships used less tough Harvey armor. The waterline belt ran the full length of the ship and its thickness varied from 178 millimeters (7.0 in) amidships to 89 millimeters (3.5 in) at the bow and stern. It had a height of 2.13 meters (7 ft 0 in), of which 1.52 meters (5 ft 0 in) was normally underwater. The upper strake of belt armor was 127 millimeters (5.0 in) thick and extended from the upper edge of the waterline belt to the main deck. It extended 65.42 meters (214 ft 8 in) from the forward to the rear barbette. The Asama class had oblique 127 mm armored bulkheads that closed off the ends of the central armored citadel.

The barbettes, gun turrets and the front of the casemates were all 152-millimeters thick while the sides and rear of the casemates were protected by 51 millimeters (2.0 in) of armor. The deck was 51-millimeters thick and the armor protecting the conning tower was 356 millimeters (14.0 in) in thickness.

== Construction and career ==
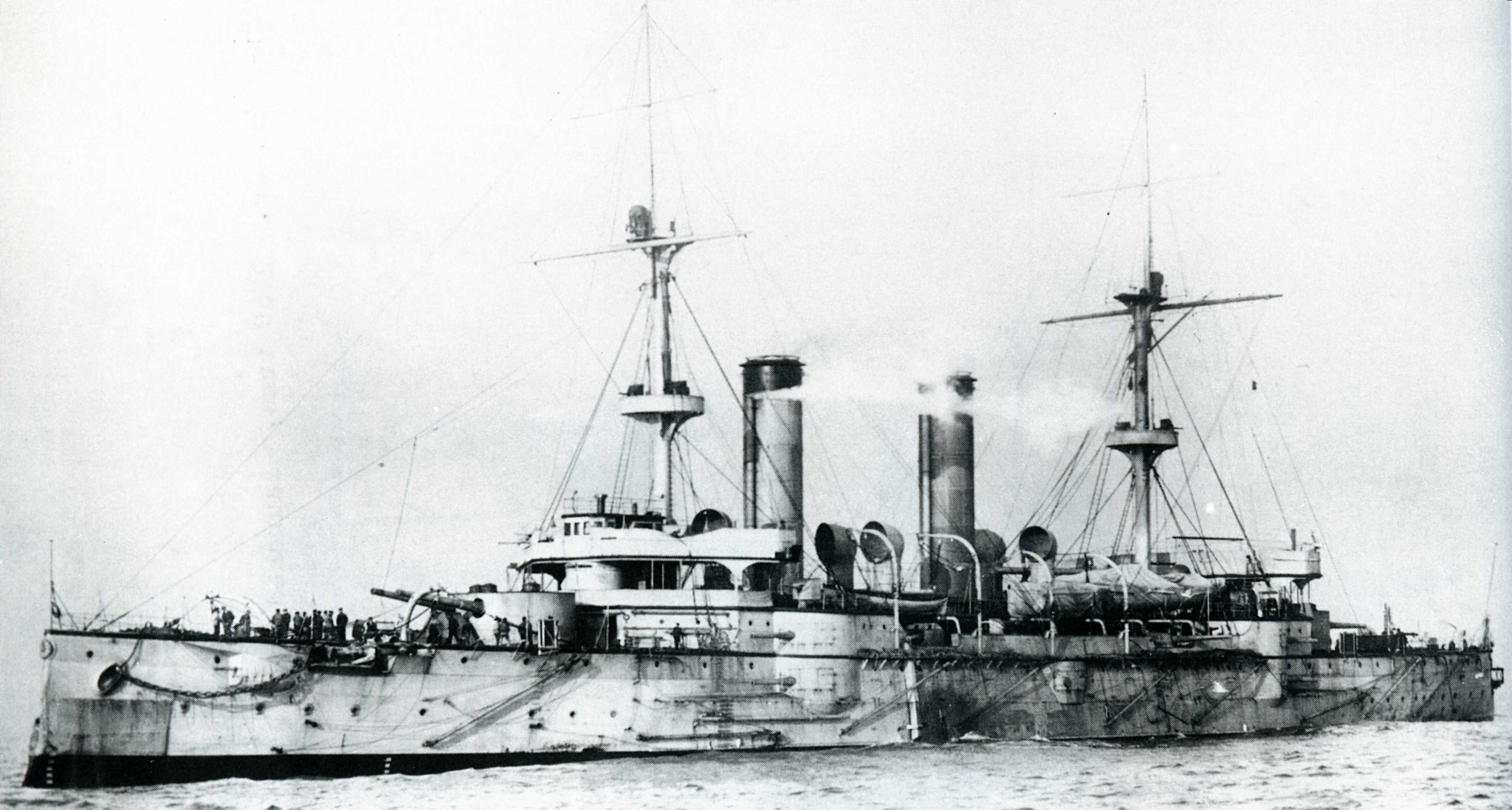
Asama at anchor on completion

The contract for Asama, named after Mount Asama, was signed on 6 July 1897 with Armstrong Whitworth. The ship had already been laid down at their shipyard in Elswick on 20 October 1896 as a speculative venture. She was launched on 21 March 1898 and completed on 18 March 1899. Asama left for Japan the next day and arrived in Yokosuka on 17 May. On 30 April 1900, the ship was used by Emperor Meiji during a fleet review off at Kobe. In July 1902, Asama was the flagship of Rear-Admiral G. Ijuin as part of the delegation dispatched to the United Kingdom for the Coronation Review for King Edward VII in Spithead on 16 August. She also visited Antwerp in July, and Cork in August. During the outward leg of this voyage, the ship tested some advanced British radio technology between Malta and Britain.

=== Russo-Japanese War ===
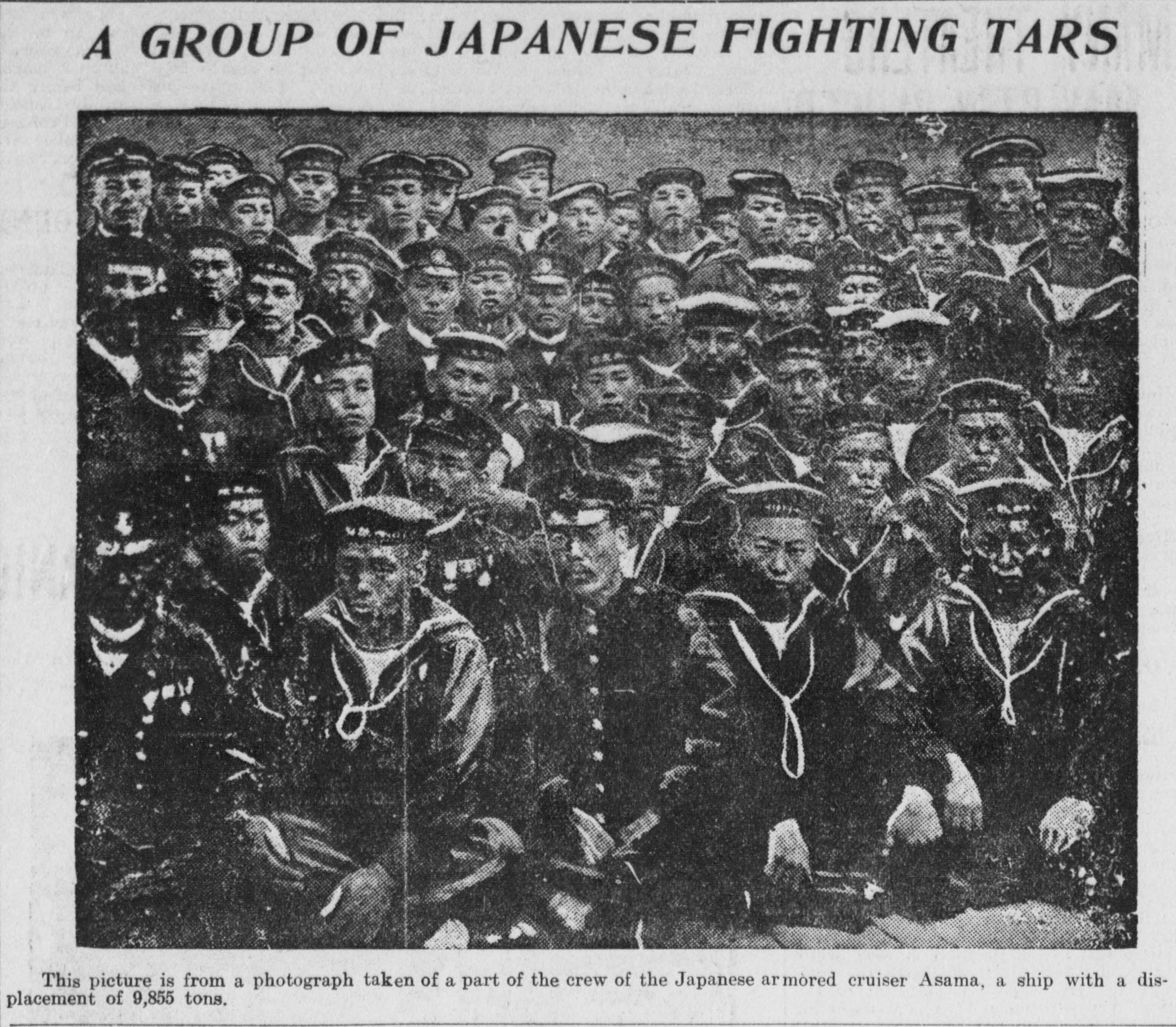
Some of the crew of Asama in 1904, prior to the Russo-Japanese War

At the beginning of the Russo-Japanese War in February 1904, Asama was assigned to the 2nd Division of the 2nd Fleet, although she was attached to the 4th Division of Rear Admiral Uryū Sotokichi for operations near Seoul, Korea. His ships were tasked to escort transports carrying troops to Chemulpo, Seoul's port on the west coast, and to destroy the Russian protected cruiser Varyag and gunboat Korietz stationed in Chemulpo as guardships. The troops were successfully unloaded during the night of 8/9 February and the Japanese ships left the harbor the following morning to assume positions blocking the exits as international law forbade combat between belligerents in neutral harbors. The Japanese notified the Russians that morning that a state of war existed between their countries after the IJN launched a surprise attack on Port Arthur the previous night. The two Russian ships sortied from the harbor later that morning. Varyag was the target of most of the Japanese fire and Asama hit her at least twice, destroying her bridge and punching a hole below her waterline that caused a serious list. The Russian ships managed to return to port and scuttled themselves that afternoon. Asama was not injured during the engagement and rejoined Vice Admiral Kamimura Hikonojō's 2nd Division afterwards.

In early March, Kamimura was tasked to take the reinforced 2nd Division north and make a diversion off Vladivostok. While scouting for Russian ships in the area, the Japanese cruisers bombarded the harbor and defenses of Vladivostok on 6 March to little effect. Upon their return to Japan a few days later, the 2nd Division was ordered to escort the transports ferrying the Imperial Guards Division to Korea and then to join the ships blockading Port Arthur. Asama was then transferred to Rear Admiral Dewa Shigetō's 3rd Division. Vice Admiral Tōgō Heihachirō, commander of the Combined Fleet, successfully lured out a portion of the Russian Pacific Squadron on 13 April, including Vice Admiral Stepan Makarov's flagship, the battleship Petropavlovsk. During this action, Asama engaged the Russian cruisers that preceded the battleships before falling back on Tōgō's battleships. When Makarov spotted the five Japanese battleships, he turned back for Port Arthur and his flagship ran into the minefield just laid by the Japanese. The ship sank in less than two minutes after one of her magazines exploded, and Makarov was one of the 677 killed. In addition to this loss, the battleship Pobeda was damaged by a mine.

On 23 June, the ship was present when the Pacific Squadron sortied in an abortive attempt to reach Vladivostok, but the new squadron commander, Rear Admiral Wilgelm Vitgeft, ordered the squadron to return to Port Arthur when it encountered the Japanese battleline shortly before sunset, as he did not wish to engage his numerically superior opponents in a night battle.

==== Battle of the Yellow Sea ====
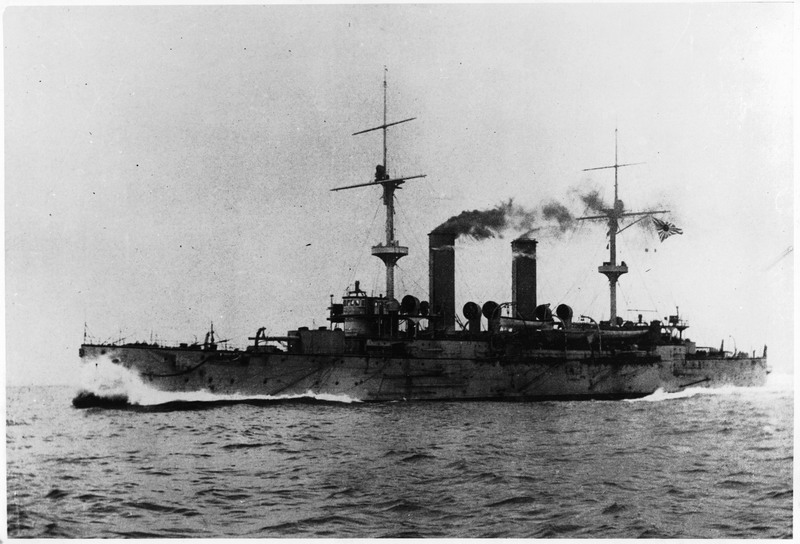
Asama at sea, c. 1904

On the morning of 10 August 1904, Asama was coaling when the Russians sortied from Port Arthur in another attempt to reach Vladivostok. The ship was not in position to join the battle until around 19:00 when she opened fire at a range of 9,000 meters (9,800 yd) from the damaged Russian battleship Poltava. The shell fell short and the Russian cruisers came to the support of the battleship so that by 19:25, Asama hotly engaged with the Russian ships at a range of 7,500 meters (8,200 yd). Despite the arrival of the elderly cruisers of Rear Admiral Hikohachi Yamada's 5th Division around 19:30, Asama was forced to disengage when the other Russian battleships came within range. The following morning she met up with Tōgō's 1st Division and then rejoined the 3rd Division. On 14 August, the 3rd Division was ordered to Qingdao to confirm that the Germans had indeed interned the battleship Tsesarevich and three destroyers that had taken shelter there after the battle. After their return, they were reassigned to the blockade of Port Arthur.

On 18 September, Asama and the armored cruiser Iwate were transferred to the 1st Division. When the Imperial Japanese Army began sinking the Russian ships in Port Arthur with large-caliber howitzers in early December, Tōgō ordered the two cruisers home to refit. On 30 December, Asama and the armored cruiser Azuma were ordered north to the Tsugaru Strait. Before the Russian ships from the Baltic Fleet approached Japan, the two cruisers were recalled south and rejoined the armored cruisers of Kamimura's 2nd Division.

==== Battle of Tsushima ====
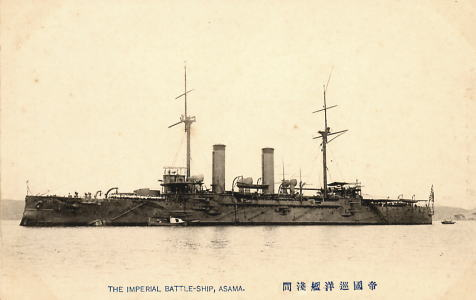
A Japanese postcard of Asama at anchor, after 1904

As the Russian 2nd and 3rd Pacific Squadrons approached Japan on 27 May, having sailed from the Baltic Sea, they were spotted by patrolling Japanese ships early that morning, but visibility was limited and radio reception poor. The preliminary reports were enough to cause Tōgō to order his ships to put to sea and the 2nd Division spotted the Russian ships under the command of Vice Admiral Zinovy Rozhestvensky at around 11:30. Kamimura closed to about a range of 8,000 meters (8,700 yd) before sheering off under fire to join Tōgō's battleships. Asama was fifth of six when Tōgō opened fire on the 2nd Pacific Squadron at 14:10 and, like most of the ships in the division, engaged the battleship Oslyabya. The cruiser was hit by a 12-inch (305 mm) shell at 14:28 and the shock knocked out her steering mechanism. She fell out of formation for repairs which were completed six minutes later. While she was attempting to rejoin Kamimura, she was struck by two more 12-inch shells that caused serious flooding, enough to increase her draft by 5 feet (1.5 m) and reduce her speed. Despite the damage, Asama was able to join the 1st Division at 15:15. The cruiser attempted to rejoin her own division at 15:50. But she was so slowed by her damage and a 6-inch hit at 16:10 that holed the base of her rear funnel, which reduced her boiler draught until repairs were completed 20 minutes later, that the ship could not take station aft of Iwate until 17:05.

After 17:30 Kamimura led his division in a fruitless pursuit of some of the Russian cruisers, leaving Tōgō's battleships to their own devices. He abandoned his chase around 18:03 and turned northwards to rejoin Tōgō. His ships spotted the rear of the Russian battleline around 18:30 and opened fire when the range closed to 8000–9000 meters. Nothing is known of any effect on the Russians and they ceased fire by 19:30 and rejoined Tōgō at 20:08 as night was falling. Asama's flooding increased overnight and she was forced to stop at 06:30 for nearly an hour before continuing. The main body of surviving Russian ships were spotted the next morning and the Japanese ships opened fire around 10:30, staying beyond the range at which the Russian ships could effectively reply. Rear Admiral Nikolai Nebogatov therefore decided to surrender his ships as he could neither return fire nor close the range. The elderly Russian armored cruiser Dmitrii Donskoi was spotted shortly before 18:00 and Asama was ordered by Tōgō to join the pursuit in support of the protected cruisers of the 4th Division. By the time the cruiser met up with the 4th Division, night had fallen and Dmitrii Donskoi had taken refuge in shallow water. She was found the following morning by the Japanese, after most of her crew had been disembarked and the ship prepared to be scuttled. The Japanese attempt to seize her was thwarted when the ship capsized and sank. During the battle, Asama was struck by three 12-, two 9-inch (229 mm) and about seven smaller shells that killed 11 men and wounded 13 more. The ship reached Maizuru Naval Arsenal on 30 May to begin repairs. She carried Emperor Meiji through the fleet during the victory review in Tokyo Bay on 15 September.

The ship was assigned to the Training Squadron from 1 June 1910 to 1 April 1911, during which time she made a training cruise with naval cadets to North and Central American and Hawaii from 16 October 1910 to 6 March 1911, accompanied by the protected cruiser Kasagi. This was the first of her dozen training cruises that lasted until 1935 and the next lasted from 20 April to 11 August 1914.

=== World War I ===
On 14 September 1914, Asama was departed Yokosuka as part of the 1st South Seas Squadron that searched for Vice Admiral Maximilian von Spee's German East Asia Squadron in the South Sea Islands. On 25 October, the ship was detached and ordered to Honolulu, Hawaii, to prevent the departure of the German gunboat SMS Geier, together with the ex-Russian battleship Hizen. After the gunboat was interned on 8 November, the two ships sailed to rendezvous with the other ships of the American Expeditionary Squadron (Note: The squadron was the Japanese component of a joint Anglo-Japanese command to protect shipping of the western coast of the Americas.) at Magdalena Bay, Baja California on the 22nd. The squadron then headed south to search along the western coast of South America for German commerce raiders. On 11 December, after the receiving the news of the British victory in the Battle of the Falkland Islands, the squadron moved north to search off the western coast of Central America and then moved north to search Mexican and U.S. waters in January.

Asama searched Mazatlán on 28 January and then proceeded to investigate the desolate and waterless bay at Puerto San Bartolomé in Baja California where her captain, Yoshioka Hansaku, also intended to recoal from the British collier SS Lena. On 31 January 1915 the ship struck an uncharted rock at the entrance to the bay and was stuck fast. The impact ripped a hole, initially estimated as 15 meters (49 ft 3 in) long, that completely flooded the boiler rooms and put 1.2 meters (4 ft) of water in the engine room. After initial attempts to get the ship off the rock failed, her crew began off-loading supplies and set kedge anchors to stabilize the cruiser and prevent further damage to her bottom. The collier SS Boyne arrived that evening and was sent to San Diego to send word of the incident to Japanese authorities as Asama was powerless and Lena lacked a radio.

The armored cruiser Izumo, flagship of the squadron commander Rear Admiral Moriyama Keizaburo, arrived on 12 February and he requested the immediate dispatch of salvage and repair ships. The protected cruiser Chitose and the supply ship SS Konan Maru arrived on 18 March and they were followed the next day by Asama's sister, Tokiwa, and the repair ship Kamakura Maru. Vice Admiral Tochinai Sojiro, who arrived aboard Tokiwa, relieved Moriyama who was due to return home. Salvage efforts began in earnest with the arrival of the repair ship Kantō on 24 March which brought over 250 shipwrights from the Yokosuka Naval Arsenal to assist. By 14 April over 1,600 metric tons (1,600 long tons) of material had been removed from the cruiser and further investigation showed that the forward boiler room had a hole 7.8 meters (25.5 ft) by 0.9 meters (3 ft) and the hole in the aft boiler room measured 2.1 meters (7 ft) by 10.2 centimeters (4 in). It was no wonder that, given the state of the ship's bottom, pumping overboard 6,764 metric tons (6,657 long tons) of water was not enough to empty the ship of water. On 8 May the ship was successfully refloated at high tide, but she required three more months of work before she could be considered minimally sea worthy. Asama tested her watertight integrity on 21 August outside the bay and she departed at a speed of 6 knots (11 km/h; 6.9 mph) for the British naval base at Esquimalt, British Columbia, two days later for temporary repairs, escorted by Chitose and Kantō. During the voyage the ship still had to pump some 710 to 810 metric tons (700 to 800 long tons) per hour. The repairs in Esquimalt reduced this figure to a mere 100 metric tons (100 long tons) per hour after the cruiser sailed for Yokosuka on 23 October. She arrived on 18 December and Emperor Taishō received her officers in the Imperial Palace two days later. Permanent repairs, which included the replacement of her boilers by 16 Miyabara water-tube boilers and the removal of her bow torpedo tube, were not completed until March 1917, Asama served as the flagship of Destroyer Squadron (Suiraisentai) 2 from 13 April to 4 August before she was transferred to the Training Squadron on 25 August. Together with Iwate, the ship cruised to the western coasts of North and Central America, Hawaii and the South Sea Islands from 2 March to 6 July 1918.

=== Inter-war activities ===
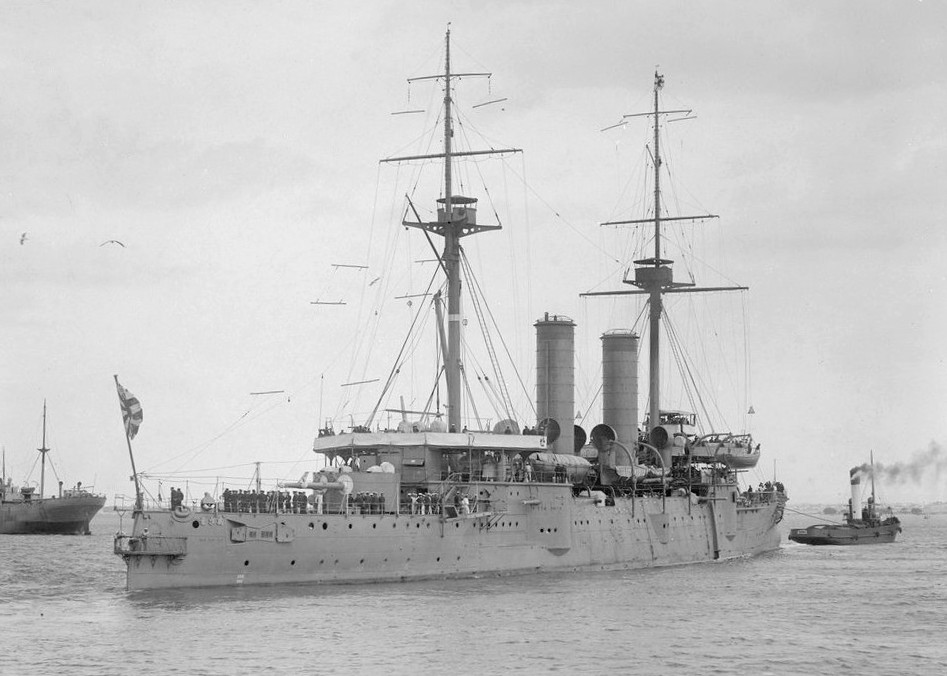
Asama being towed to sea off Australia, between 1923 and 1935

After World War I, Asama was used primarily for long range oceanic navigation training by officer candidates. On 21 August 1920, she began a training voyage to South America and Polynesia that lasted until 2 April 1921. She was re-designated a 1st class coast defense ship on 1 September 1921. In 1922, all of her main deck guns, six 6-inch and four 12-pounder guns, were removed and their casemates plated over. In addition all of her QF 2.5-pounder guns were removed and a single 8 cm/40 3rd Year Type anti-aircraft gun was added.

Beginning on 26 June 1922, Asama resumed making training cruises, usually at two-year intervals, that took her to Australia, Southeast Asia, and the Mediterranean Sea among other places. They came to an end after she ran aground on the night of 13 October 1935 north north-west of the Kurushima Strait in the Inland Sea. Her bottom was badly damaged and she was deemed no longer seaworthy after repairs were completed at Kure Naval Arsenal. The ship was then assigned as a stationary training ship for the Kure Naval Corps on 5 July 1938.

=== World War II ===
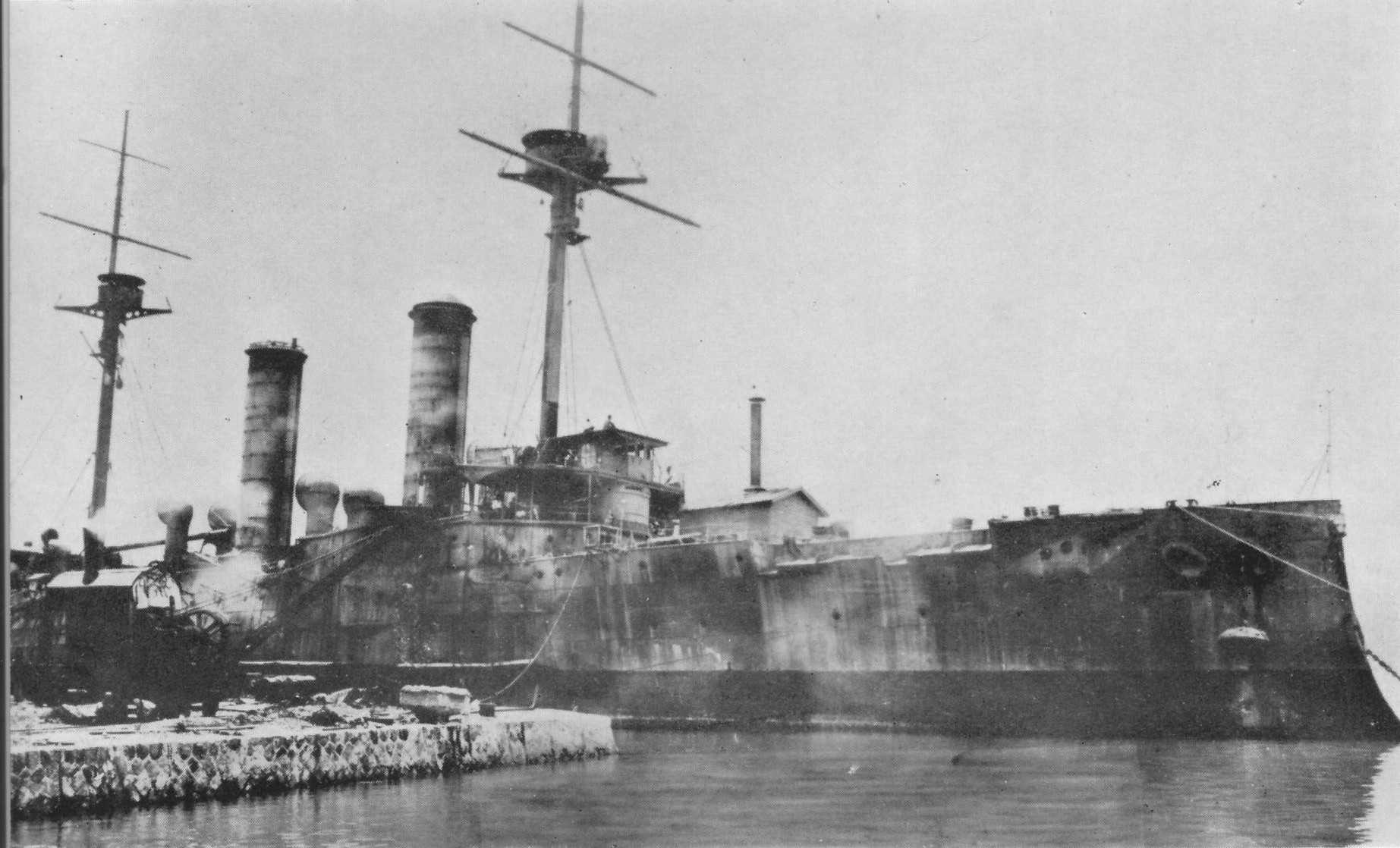
Asama on 25 August 1946

Asama was reclassified as a training ship in July 1942 and was towed to Shimonoseki 5 August 1942 where she became a gunnery training ship. She was disarmed at some point during the Pacific War, only retaining several 8 cm/40 3rd Year Type anti-aircraft guns, and she was stricken from the navy list on 30 November 1945. The ship was scrapped at the Innoshima shipyard of the Hitachi Zosen Corporation from 15 August 1946 to 25 March 1947.
