= Hitachi Maru Incident =

Maritime incident

- Part of the Russo-Japanese War
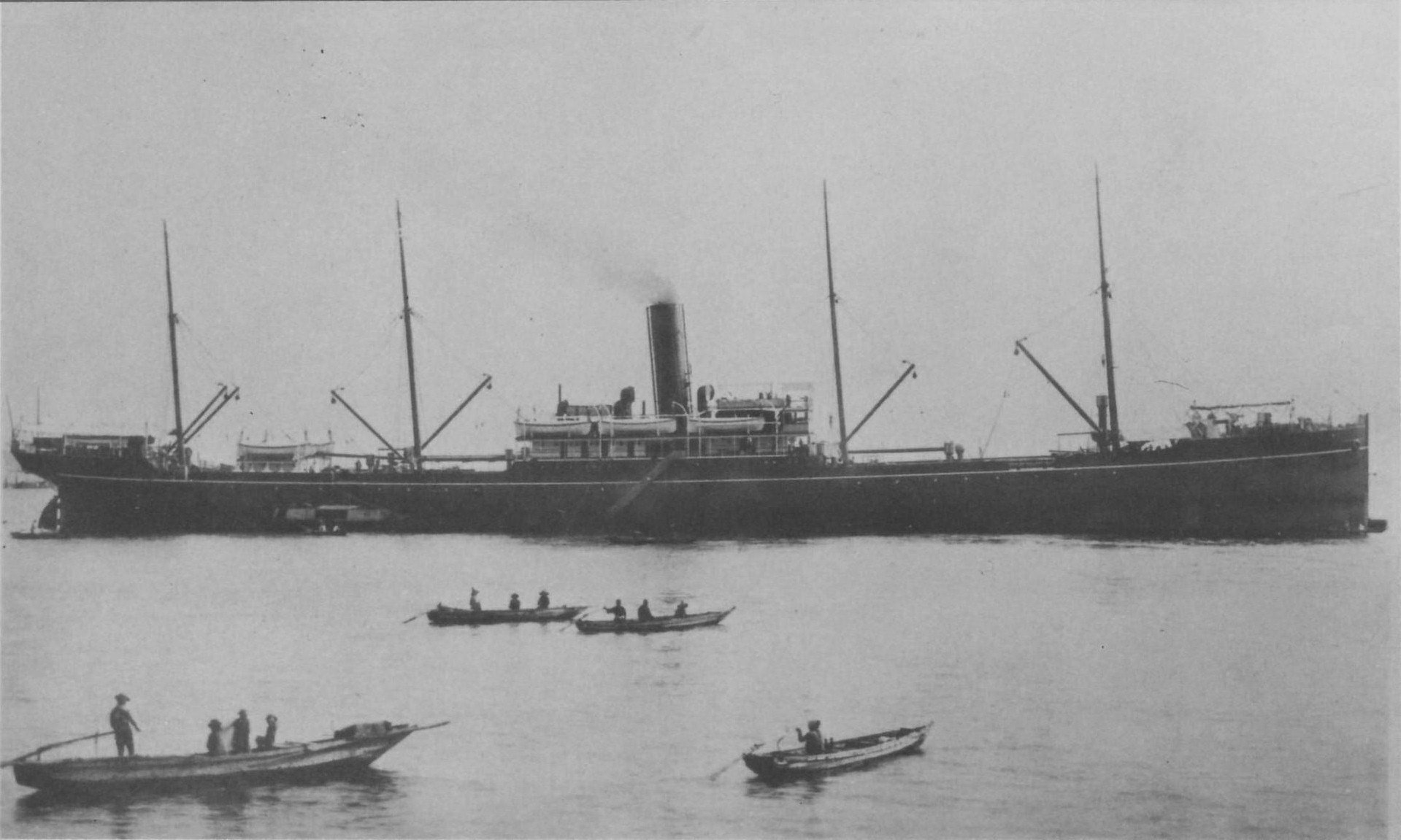
- Hitachi Maru in 1898
Date	15 June 1904
Location	Tsushima Strait
Result	Russian victory

Belligerents
Empire of Japan	Russian Empire

Commanders and leaders
Unknown	(Russian Empire) Petr Bezobrazov

Strength
3 unarmed transports	3 armored cruisers

Casualties and losses
2 ships sunk 1 grounded 1,334 killed 112 wounded	None

The Hitachi Maru Incident (常陸丸事件, Hitachi-maru jiken) was a maritime incident which occurred during the Russo-Japanese War of 1904–1905, in which three Japanese military transports were sunk in a Russian commerce raiding sortie by a Vladivostok-based armored cruiser squadron of the Imperial Russian Navy.

== Background ==
At the start of the Russo-Japanese War, the bulk of the Russian Pacific Fleet was blockaded within the confines of Port Arthur by the Imperial Japanese Navy. However, the Russian subsidiary naval base at Vladivostok, although shelled by a Japanese squadron under the command of Vice Admiral Dewa Shigetō in March 1904, remained largely undamaged and unblockaded. Located at Vladivostok was a garrison force consisting of the protected cruiser Bogatyr and auxiliary cruiser Lena and a stronger Vladivostok Independent Cruiser Squadron consisting of the armored cruisers Russian cruiser Rossia, Rurik, and Gromoboi, under the command of Rear Admiral Karl Jessen.

This small squadron put to sea in the early months of the conflict for commerce raiding operations, and it was the concern of the Imperial Japanese Navy that it might be used either to attack targets on the Japanese mainland, or to coordinate an attack to lift the blockade on Port Arthur. The Japanese were forced to assign the IJN 2nd Fleet under the command of Vice Admiral Kamimura Hikonojō with considerable resources in an attempt to locate and destroy it.

== Attack on Tsushima Strait ==
Russian Vice Admiral Petr Bezobrazov departed Vladivostok on 12 June 1904 with Rossia, Rurik, and Gromoboi under orders to proceed through the eastern Tsushima Channel in the Korean Strait, cruise for two days on known transport routes, and to then double back through the western channel, after which he was to attempt to join his forces to the fleet still blockaded at Port Arthur. On 15 June, he sighted two military transports, Hitachi Maru and Sado Maru en route to Dalny.

Hitachi Maru was transporting 1,238 people, including 727 men of the 1st Reserve Regiment of the Imperial Guard of Japan and 359 men from the IJA 10th Division. Sado Maru was transporting 1,258 people, including 867 members of a railway engineering battalion. Both vessels were transporting a large amount of stores, most critically needed were eighteen Armstrong 11-inch (280 mm) siege howitzers and the train wagons needed to transport them, requested by the IJA 3rd Army to attack the Russian fortifications at Port Arthur.

Passing in the opposite direction was the smaller Izumi Maru, which was being used as an unarmed, but unmarked hospital ship transporting sick and wounded men from the front back to Japan.

The only provision the Imperial Japanese Navy had made for protection of its transports was the protected cruiser Tsushima, which at this time (0715) was stationed approximately mid-channel. Tsushima sighted the Russian squadron in the heavy early morning fog, but was unable to raise a warning due to the short range of its wireless, and poor atmospheric conditions, and attempted to close the distance to Tsushima Island where conditions were better. She was sighted by the Russian squadron, but they did not pursue. Tsushima managed to transmit her warning at 0815 hours, and then headed back towards the Russian squadron. Admiral Kamimura, based at Takeshiki Guard District on Tsushima sent a warning to Shimonoseki to stop all sailing, then ordered his ships to pursue Tsushima.

However, at 0900, the Russian squadron sighted Izumi Maru, and Bezobrazov sent Gromoboi to chase her. Gromoboi opened fire, killing or wounding over 30 men, before the Japanese transport stopped and surrendered. About 100 sick and wounded were taken off her, and then she was sunk west of Okinoshima, with those who refused to surrender still aboard. Around 1000, the Russian squadron sighted Sado Maru, and came into sight of the Japanese fleet at about the same time. Despite having just given the Japanese transport 40 minutes to surrender and abandon ship, Rurik fired two torpedoes into Sado Maru, which exploded, killing 239 passengers and crew, but which did not sink the ship. Sado Maru eventually drifted for the next 30 hours until she grounded on Okinoshima.

Next, Gromoboi approached Hitachi Maru, which exhibited no sign of intending to surrender. Gromoboi opened fire with all guns, killing many of the men on deck, including her British captain and senior crewmen, and sinking the ship. Due to deteriorating visibility, the Japanese fleet could not close with the Russian squadron, and at 1330 reached the 152 survivors from Hitachi Maru.

== Aftermath ==
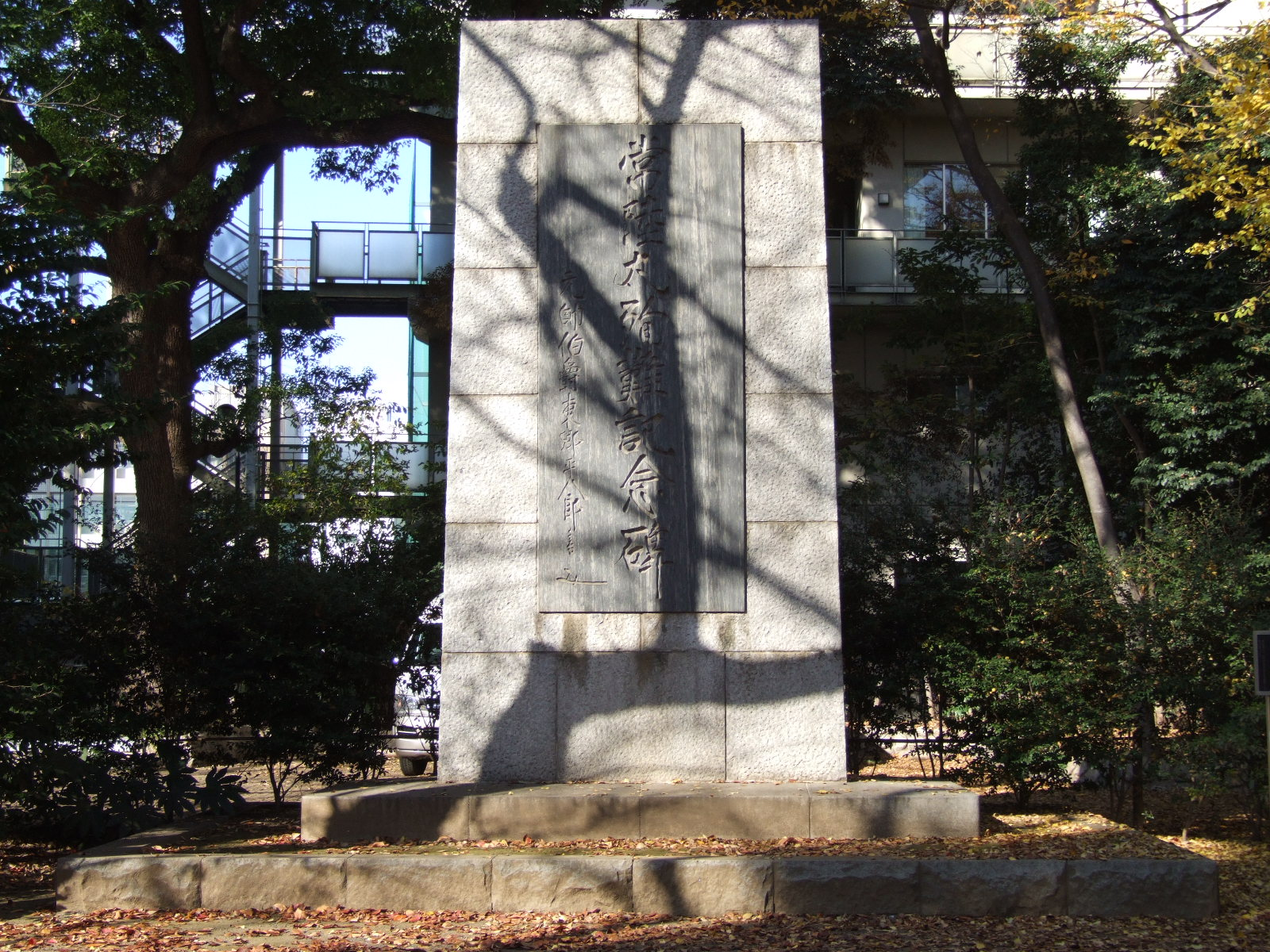
Hitachi Maru Memorial stele at Yasukuni Shrine

The Russian squadron continued its operations against shipping on 16 June, when they seized the British steamer Allanton off Maizuru. The cruisers also sank two sailing boats the following day.

The attack was a severe blow to Japanese public morale. Memorials were erected in Chidorigafuchi Park in Tokyo, and a mass grave commemorating the Imperial Guards was erected in Aoyama Cemetery. A monument to Sado Maru was built in Shiba Park (and was moved to Yasukuni Shrine in 1964). Kamimura received numerous death threats and came under extreme pressure to track down the Russian squadron, which he did at the Battle off Ulsan on 14 August 1904.
