= Pyotr Bezobrazov =

Russian admiral

Pyotr Alekseyevich Bezobrazov
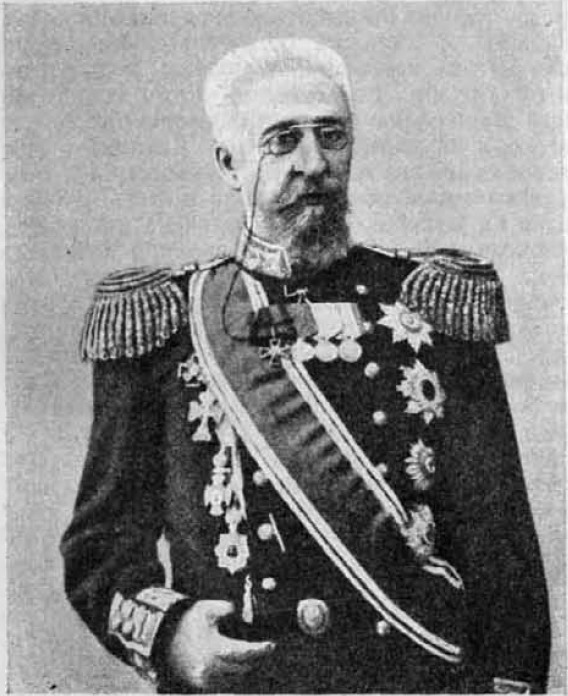
- Born: 29 January 1845
- Died: 17 July 1906 (aged 61)
- Military career
- Allegiance: Russian Empire
- Branch: Imperial Russian Navy
- Service years: 1866–1906
- Rank: Vice Admiral
- Commands: Baltic Fleet
- Conflicts: Russo-Japanese War

Pyotr Alekseyevich Bezobrazov (Russian: Пётр Алексе́евич Безобра́зов; 29 January 1845 – 17 July 1906) was an admiral in the Imperial Russian Navy.

== Early career ==
Born into an old Bezobrazov noble family, Pyotr began his naval service as a midshipman on the frigate Dmitry Donskoy from 1864 to 1866. He was promoted to warrant officer in 1866, to lieutenant in 1870 and to lieutenant-commander in 1880. He became executive officer of the frigate Svetlana in 1883. He became captain 2nd rank in 1885 after commanding a number of gunboats, and to captain, 1st rank in 1890. From 1893 to 1897, he was captain of the armoured cruiser General-Admiral, which visited ports in the eastern United States as part of the celebration of the 1893 Chicago World Exposition. He was then appointed captain of the battleship Navarin.

Bezobrazov was promoted to rear admiral in 1897, and served as chief of staff of the naval base at Kronstadt in 1898, and deputy commander of the Baltic Fleet from 1898 to 1901. He was made deputy commander of the Black Sea Fleet from 1901 to 1903, and promoted to vice admiral on 1 January 1904.

== Russo-Japanese War ==
After the start of the Russo-Japanese War and the death of Vice Admiral Stepan Makarov, Bezobravov was appointed commander of the First Pacific Squadron on 8 May 1904. He arrived at Vladivostok on 12 June 1904 via the Trans-Siberian Railroad, but was unable to reach the squadron at Port Arthur due to the Japanese blockade. He assumed command of the Independent Cruiser Squadron based at Vladivostok, consisting of the armoured cruisers Rossia, Rurik, and Gromoboi and led the squadron on a successful attack (the "Hitachi Maru Incident") on 15 June 1904 on Japanese shipping in the Korea Strait. For this mission, he was awarded the Order of St Vladimir, 2nd class with swords.

On 27 September 1904, Bezobravov was promoted to command the Baltic Fleet and to the post of acting Chief of the Naval Staff in place of Admiral Zinovy Rozhestvensky (a position which he held to July 1906), and returned to St Petersburg. He died in St Petersburg and his grave was at the Novodevichy Cemetery.

== Awards ==
- Order of St Vladimir 4th degree, 1890
- Order of St Vladimir 3rd degree, 1894
- Order of St Vladimir 2nd degree, with swords, 1904
- Order of St. Anne 3rd degree
- Order of St. Anne 2nd degree
- Order of St. Anne 1st degree, 1903
- Order of St. Stanislaus 3rd degree
- Order of St. Stanislaus 2nd degree
- Order of St. Stanislaus 1st degree, 1900
- Order of the Rising Sun (Japan), 2nd class, 1901
- Order of the Crown (Romania), 1901
- Order of Military Merit (Bulgaria), 1901
