= Hosho =

Hosho can refer to several things:

- Japanese warship Hōshō, launched in 1868
- Japanese aircraft carrier Hōshō, launched in 1921
- Medals of Honor (Hōshō), several medals awarded by the Government of Japan
- Hōshō (Noh school), school of Noh theatre
- Hosho (instrument), a Zimbabwean musical instrument
- Fuyo Hōshō, a son of Uija, the last king of Baekje
