= 28 cm howitzer L/10 =

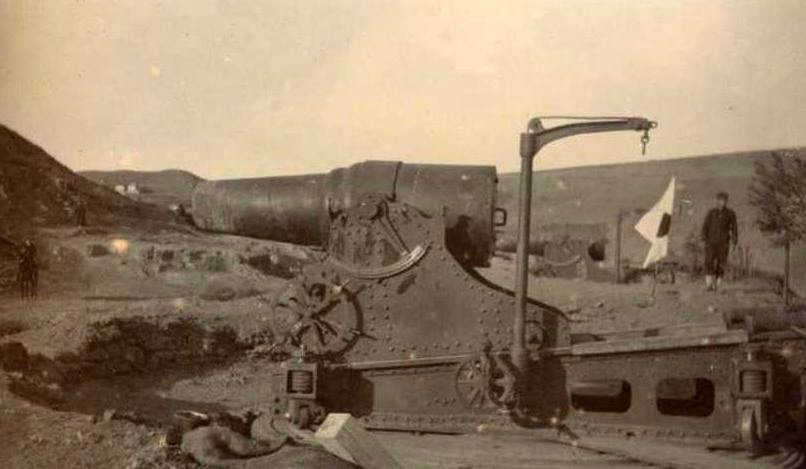
- A 28 cm howitzer during the siege of Port Arthur.
- Type: Coastal artillery, Heavy siege howitzer
- Place of origin: Empire of Japan

Service history
- In service: 1892-1945
- Used by: Imperial Japanese Army
- Wars: Russo-Japanese War, Second Sino-Japanese War

Production history
- Designer: Armstrong
- Designed: 1884
- Manufacturer: Osaka Artillery Arsenal
- No. built: 327 total (220 for coastal defense)

Specifications
- Mass: 10.758 tonnes (10.588 long tons; 11.859 short tons)
- Barrel length: 2.863 m (9.39 ft) (L10.2)
- Shell: Separate loading bagged charge and projectile
- Shell weight: 217 kg (478 lb)
- Caliber: 280 mm (11 in)
- Breech: Interrupted Screw
- Carriage: Box trail
- Elevation: -10° to +68° (firing)
- Traverse: 360°
- Muzzle velocity: 314 m/s (1,030 ft/s)
- Maximum firing range: 7,800 m (8,500 yd)

The 28 cm howitzer L/10 (二十八糎榴弾砲, nijūhachi-senchi ryūdanhō) was a Japanese coastal and siege howitzer. It was developed by Armstrong before 1892 and saw service in the Russo-Japanese War during the siege of Port Arthur and the Second Sino-Japanese War.

== Design and description ==
The 28 cm Howitzer L/10 was designed in 1884 by the British Armstrong company. Armstrong had an Italian subsidiary which produced guns for the Italian Navy and Major Pompeo Grillo, a heavy artillery specialist was hired in April 1884 to help the construction of artillery at a new plant in Osaka. The description from Brassey's Naval Annual of 1892 reads "The howitzer was a 28-cm rifled breech-loader of cast iron, 9 calibres long made at Osaka, from the designs of guns made for the Italians by Sir W.G. Armstrong". The Italians produced the design in a number of different lengths and they were designated by their diameter and length in calibers 280/9, 280/10, 280/11, and 280/16. Some 220 pieces were manufactured by the Osaka Artillery Arsenal for Japanese coastal defence. It was mounted on a turntable which was fixed to a steel firing platform. It required two to four days to emplace for firing. An ammunition crane was fixed to the carriage for ease of loading. The howitzer entered service in 1892 and was installed in shore batteries in forts overlooking Tokyo Bay and Osaka Bay, and had been intended for anti-ship operations. However it saw use as a siege gun during the Russo-Japanese War due to a lack of heavy siege guns.

== Combat history ==
=== Russo-Japanese War ===
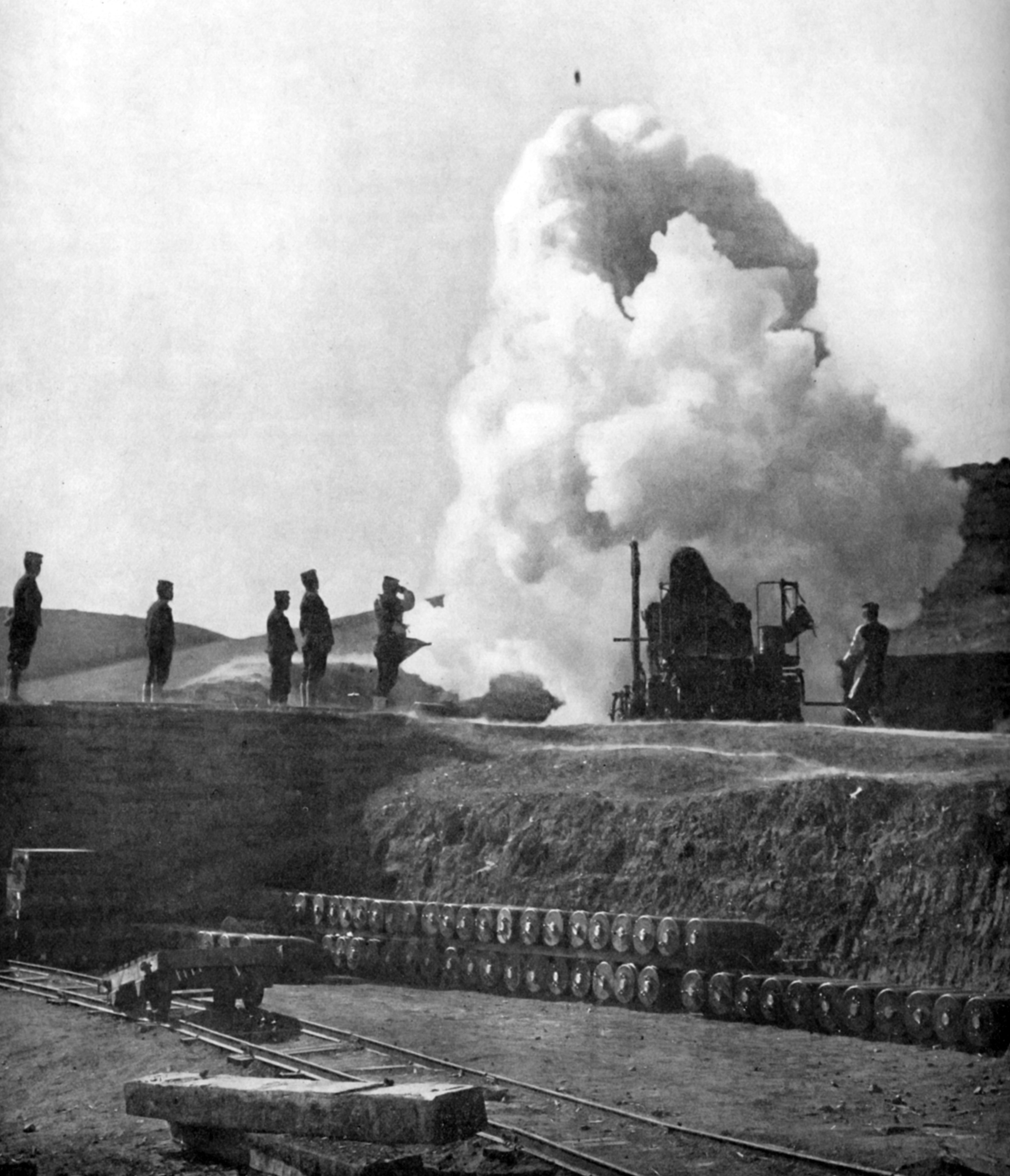
A shell, visible above the smoke, is fired on Port Arthur

During the Russo-Japanese War, the Japanese Third Army was besieging Port Arthur. While the capture of Port Arthur had been achieved in a single assault during the First Sino-Japanese War, the situation was different in 1904. The Russians had been in possession of Port Arthur since 1897 and had constructed strong fortifications around the city following the plans of General Eduard Totleben. After the first general assault in August 1904 yielded over 16,000 casualties, General Nogi, the commanding officer of the Japanese forces, requested heavy siege guns. With the arrival of the first battery of 28 cm howitzers, replacing those lost when the transport Hitachi Maru, loaded with a battalion of the First Reserve Regiment of the Guards, was sunk by Russian cruisers in the Hitachi Maru Incident on June 15, 1904, the situation changed. The massive 11-inch howitzers could throw a 217 kilogram (478 pound) shell over 7.8 kilometers (4.8 miles), and Nogi then had the firepower necessary to seriously damage the Russian fortifications. The huge shells were nicknamed "roaring trains" by the Russian troops (for the sound they made just before impact), and during their period at Port Arthur over 16,949 of these shells were fired.

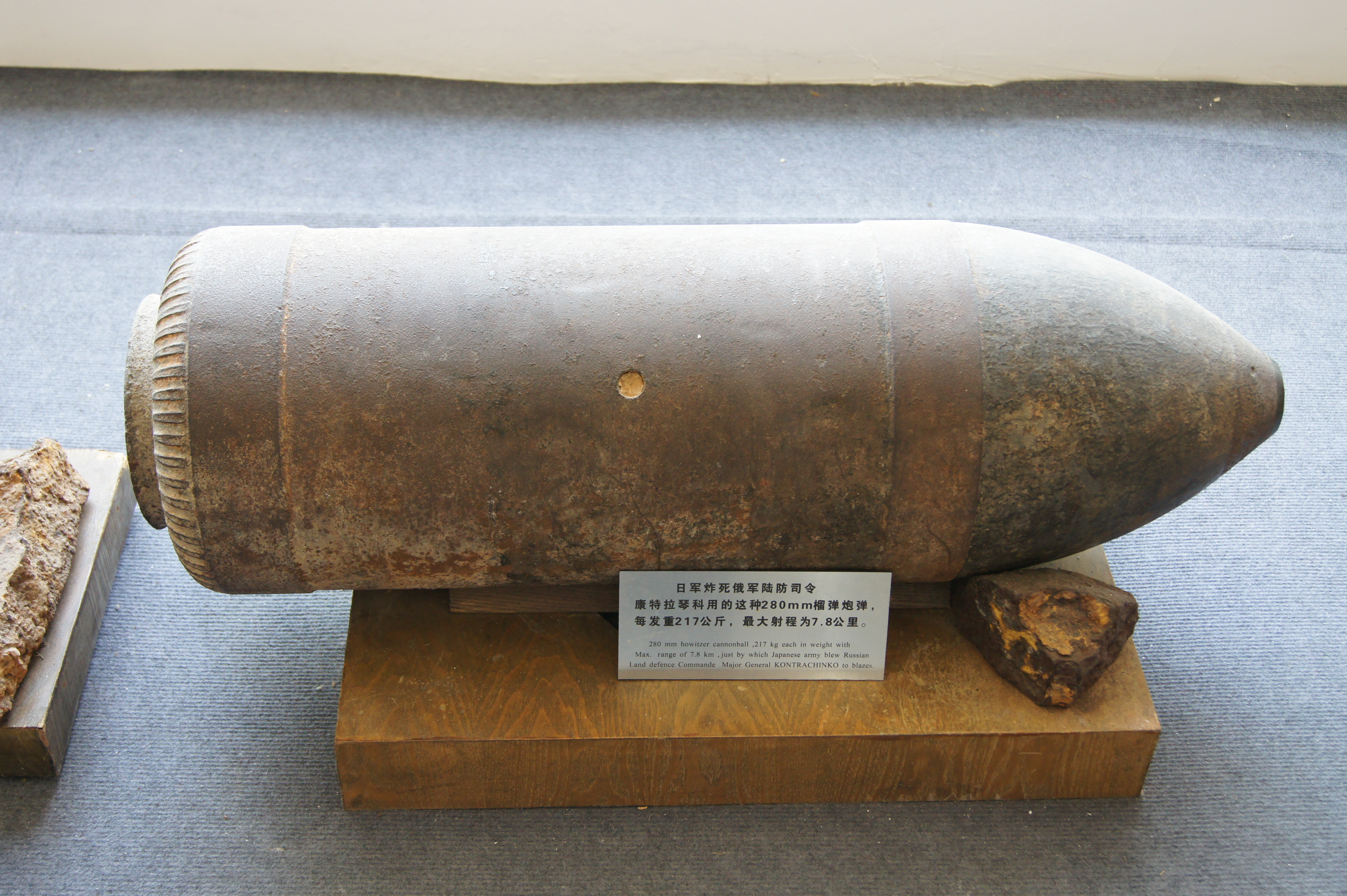
A 217 kilogram (478 pound) shell of the 28 cm Howitzer.

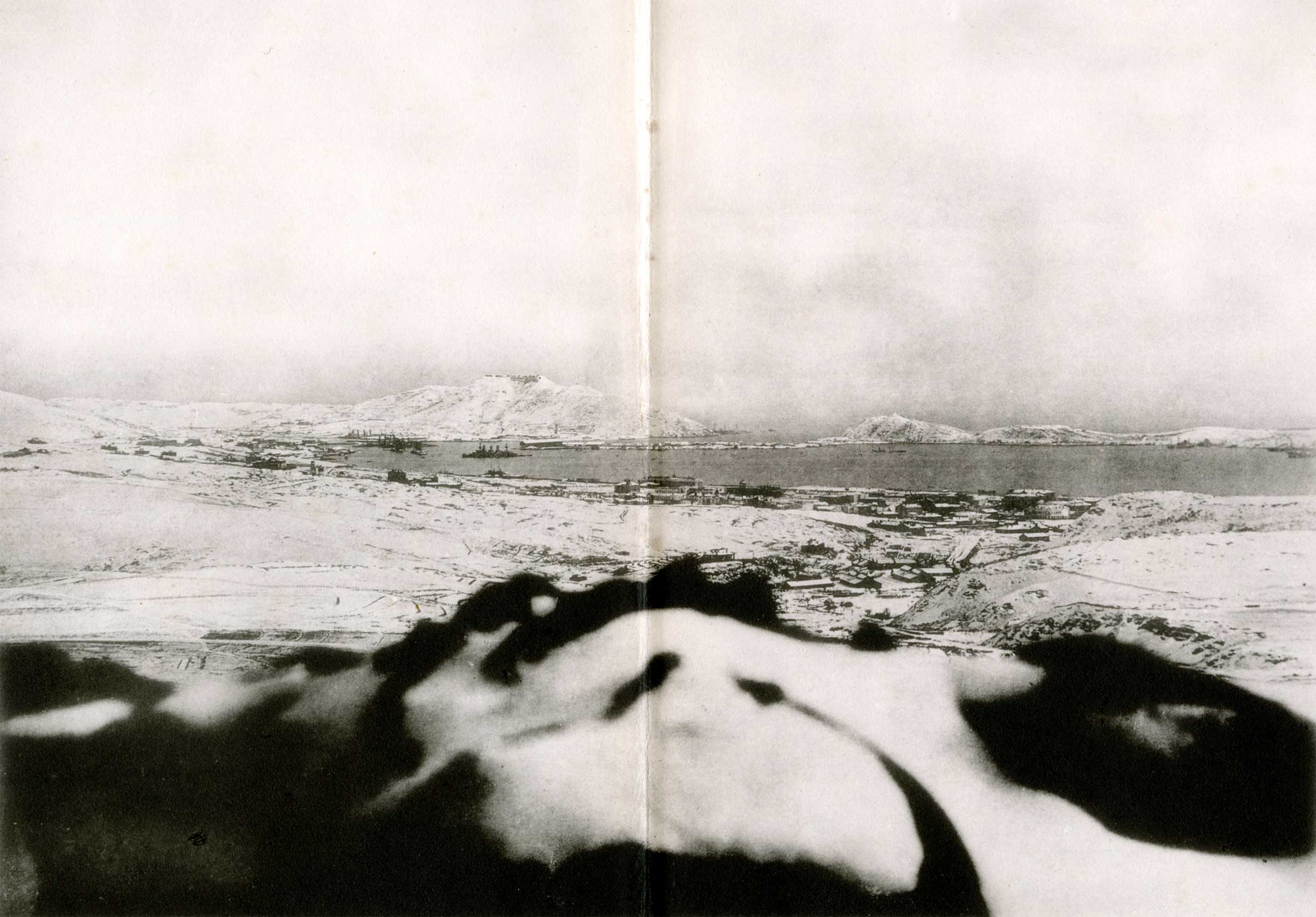
Port Arthur viewed from the top of a 203-meter hill, looking at the ships of the Russian Pacific Fleet

At 10:30 on December 5, following another massive artillery bombardment, the Japanese managed to overrun 203 Meter Hill overlooking the harbour of Port Arthur with the Russian Pacific Fleet at anchor. They sent an artillery observer on the hill, directing the fire of the 28 cm howitzer, systematically sinking the Russian fleet, one ship after another. On December 5, 1904, the battleship Poltava was sunk, followed by the battleship Retvizan on December 7, 1904, the battleships Pobeda and Peresvet and the cruisers Pallada and Bayan on December 9, 1904. All six would be raised, repaired, renamed, and recommissioned by the Japanese after the war. The battleship Sevastopol, although hit five times by 11-inch (280 mm) shells, managed to move out of range of the guns. On the night of January 2, 1905, after Port Arthur surrendered, Captain Nikolai Essen of the Sevastopol had the crippled battleship scuttled in 30 fathoms (55 m) of water by opening the sea cocks on one side, so that the ship would sink on its side and could not be raised and salvaged by the Japanese.

=== Second Sino-Japanese War ===
In November 1939 during the Second Sino-Japanese War, 28 cm howitzers were deployed at the Yellow River where they put a railway tunnel out of action for over three months.

=== World War II ===
Due to a lack of alternatives, the Japanese reactivated the 28 cm howitzer for coastal defence in 1945, expecting the landing of the Allies. Thirteen guns were emplaced on Kyushu, six on Shikoku, 62 on Honshu and 10 on Hokkaido. Also, two batteries of the 28 cm howitzers were used by 132nd Independent Mixed Brigade at Dongning, Heilongjiang, during the Soviet invasion of Manchuria in 1945. Two batteries of 28 cm howitzers were emplaced with the Najin Fortress Garrison in Rason.
