= Japanese ship Hōshō =

Two ships of the Imperial Japanese Navy were named Hōshō:

- Japanese warship Hōshō, a screw sloop launched in 1868 and scrapped in 1907
- Japanese aircraft carrier Hōshō, an aircraft carrier launched in 1921 and scrapped in 1946
