= SS Hitachi Maru (1898) =

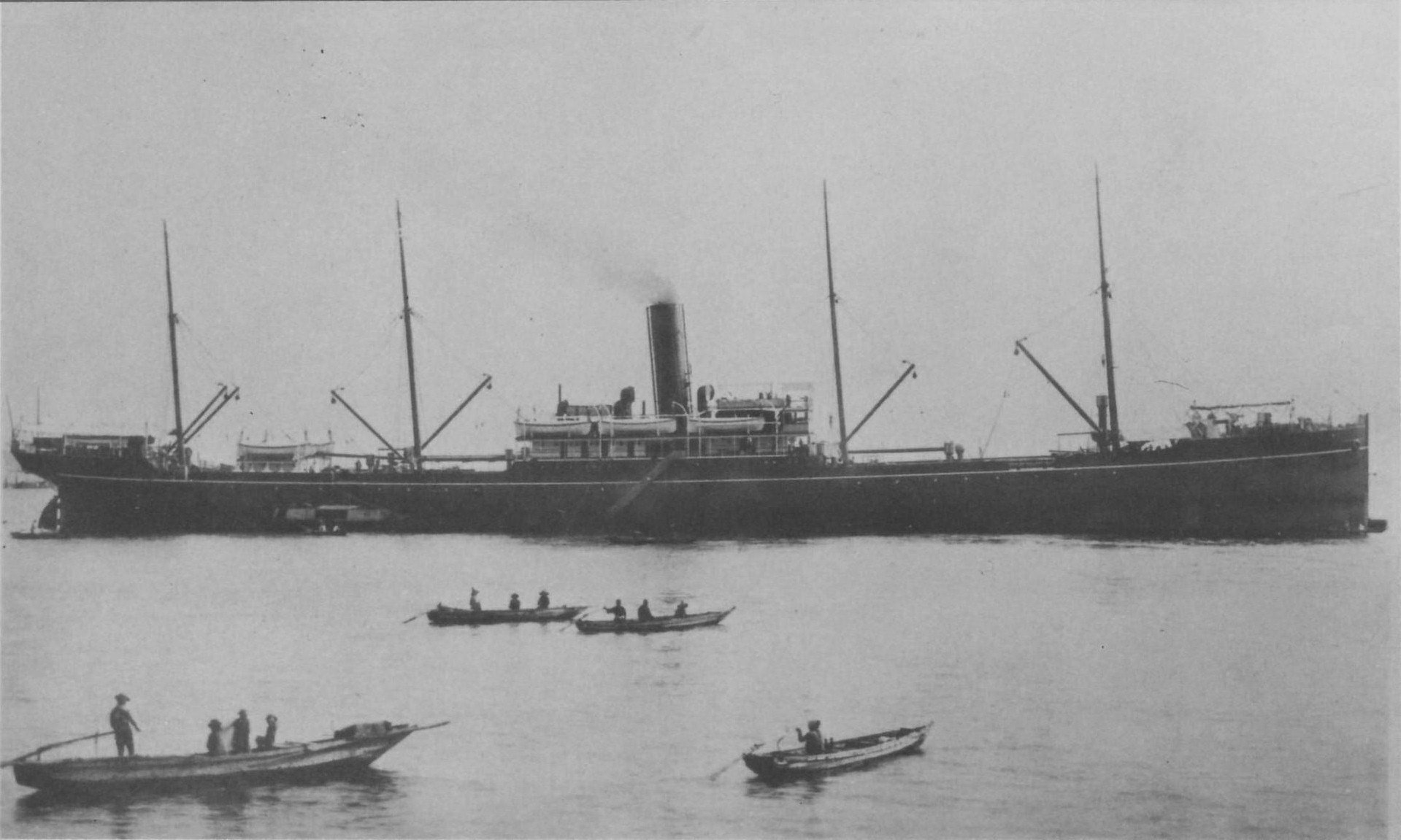
- Hitachi Maru between 1898 and 1904

History

Japan
- Name: Hitachi Maru
- Owner: NYK
- Builder: Mitsubishi Shipbuilding & Engineering Co., Nagasaki
- Yard number: 99
- Laid down: 21 December 1896
- Launched: 16 April 1898
- Commissioned: 16 August 1898
- Home port: Tokyo
- Identification: Japanese official number 2331; code letters HNST
- Fate: Scuttled, 15 June 1904

General characteristics
- Type: Passenger cargo Ship
- Tonnage: 6,172 GRT; 3,827 NRT
- Length: 445 ft 0 in (135.64 m)
- Beam: 49 ft 4 in (15.04 m)
- Depth: 30 ft 5 in (9.27 m)
- Installed power: 549 NHP
- Propulsion: 2 × Mitsubishi Shipbuilding & Engineering Co. 3-cylinder triple expansion; 2 × propellers
- Speed: 14.2 knots (26.3 km/h; 16.3 mph)
- Capacity: 24 first class; 20 second class; 116 third class

Hitachi Maru (常陸丸) was a 6,172 gross register tons (GRT) combined passenger-cargo ship built by Mitsubishi Shipbuilding in Nagasaki, for NYK Lines in 1898. She was requisitioned in 1904 by the Imperial Japanese Army during the Russo-Japanese War.

== Background ==
In 1896, following the First Sino-Japanese War, NYK Lines announced an ambitious expansion plan for shipping routes to Europe, which would require up to twelve new vessels. Up until this time, all such vessels had been purchased from overseas sources; however, with the promulgation of the Japanese Shipbuilding Assistance Law in 1896, Mitsubishi was able to secure a contract from NYK for two of these vessels. Previously, the largest vessel constructed by Mitsubishi had been the Suma Maru (1,592 tons) for the OSK Lines, so the construction of such a large steel vessel entirely in Japan was unprecedented. Although the company enlisted the support of foreign advisors and used foreign blueprints as a guide, the work took longer than expected, and Mitsubishi eventually was forced to pay compensation to NYK for the cancellation of one of the vessels, and for the delay in delivery of the vessel later named Hitachi Maru.

Hitachi Maru was placed into service with NYK on its European routes for almost six years. In February, 1904, she was requisitioned by the Imperial Japanese Army to transport men and war materials from Japan to ports in Korea and Manchuria in support of the Russo-Japanese War. While transporting 1,238 people, including 727 men of the 1st Reserve Regiment of the Imperial Guard of Japan and 359 men from the IJA 10th Division and 18 Krupp 11-inch (280 mm) siege howitzers, she was shelled and sunk by the Imperial Russian Navy armored cruiser Gromoboi in the southern Korean Strait between the Japanese mainland and Tsushima in the "Hitachi Maru Incident".

There were only 152 survivors, meaning 1,086 people lost their lives.
