= Russian cruiser Rossia =

Russian armored cruiser

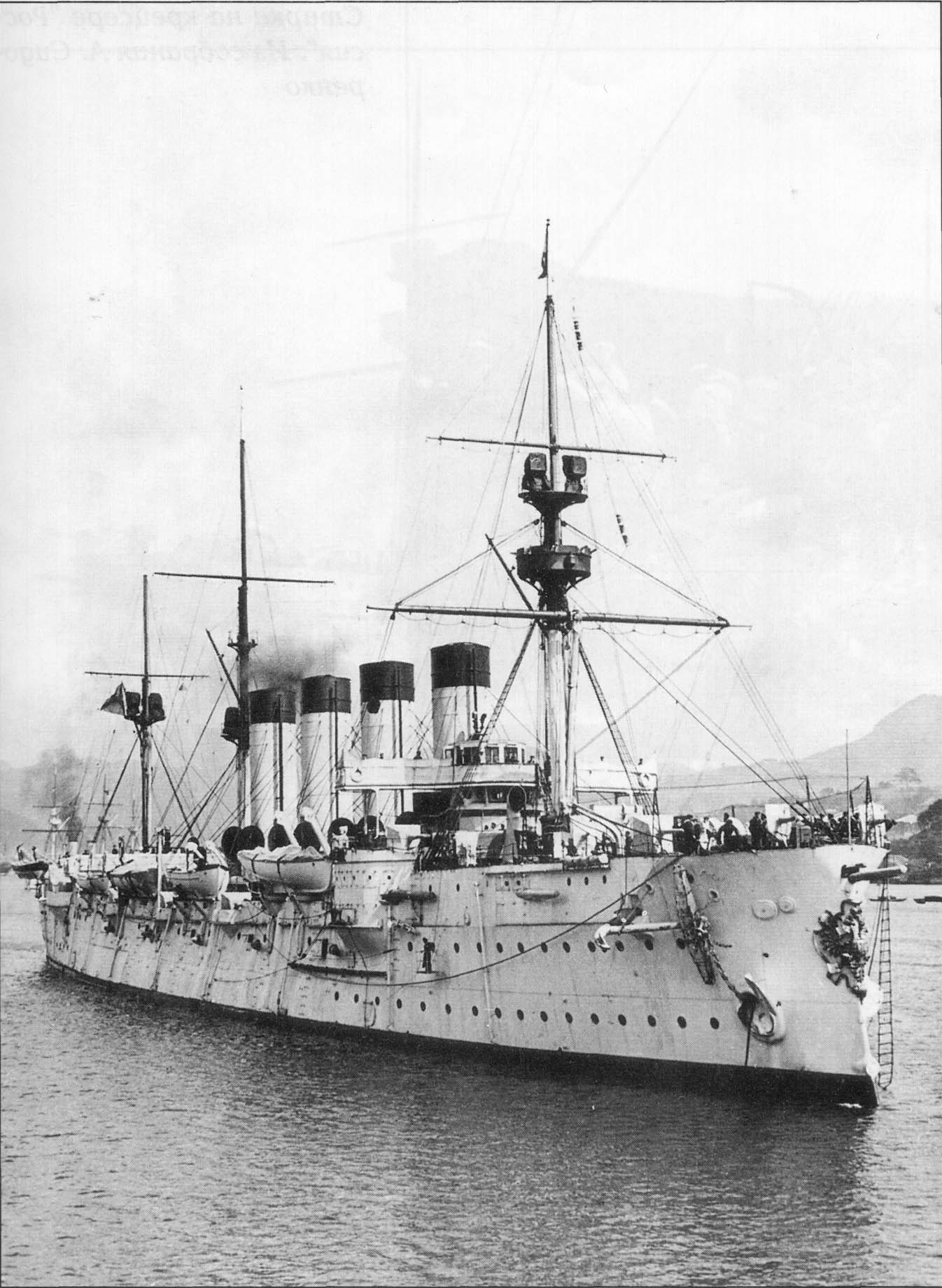
- Rossia

Class overview
- Name: Rossia
- Operators: Russian Navy
- Preceded by: Rurik
- Succeeded by: Gromoboi
- Built: 1893–1896
- In commission: 1896–1922
- Planned: 1
- Completed: 1
- Scrapped: 1

History

Russian Empire
- Name: Rossiya (Russian: Россия)
- Namesake: Russia
- Operator: Imperial Russian Navy
- Builder: Baltic Works, Saint Petersburg
- Laid down: October 1893 (Note: All dates used in this article are New Style)
- Launched: 30 April 1896
- Commissioned: Late 1896
- Fate: Sold for scrap, 1 July 1922

General characteristics (as built)
- Type: Armored cruiser
- Displacement: 12,195 long tons (12,391 t)
- Length: 485 ft (147.8 m)
- Beam: 66.6 ft (20.3 m)
- Draught: 26.2 ft (8.0 m)
- Installed power: 32 Belleville water-tube boilers; 14,500 ihp (10,800 kW) + 2,500 ihp (1,864 kW)
- Propulsion: 3 shafts, 2 triple-expansion steam engines + 1 TE cruising engine
- Speed: 19 knots (35 km/h; 22 mph)
- Range: 7,740 nmi (14,330 km; 8,910 mi) at 10 knots (19 km/h; 12 mph)
- Complement: 839 officers and crewmen
- Armament: 4 × single 8 in (203 mm) guns; 16 × single 6 in (152 mm) guns; 12 × single 75 mm (3.0 in) guns; 20 × single 47 mm (1.9 in) guns; 18 × single 37 mm (1.5 in) guns; 5 × 15 in (381 mm) torpedo tubes
- Armor: Harvey armor; Belt: 5–8 in (127–203 mm); Deck: 2–3 in (51–76 mm); Conning tower: 12 in (305 mm)

Rossia (Russian: Россия) was an armored cruiser of the Imperial Russian Navy built in the 1890s. She was designed as a long-range commerce raider and served as such during the Russo-Japanese War of 1904–05. She was based in Vladivostok when the war broke out and made a number of sorties in search of Japanese shipping in the early months of the war without much success.

Rossia, along with the other armored cruisers of the Vladivostok Cruiser Squadron, attempted to rendezvous in the Strait of Tsushima with the main portion of the Pacific Fleet sailing from Port Arthur in August 1904, but were delayed and had to return to port without them. They encountered a Japanese squadron of four armored cruisers between them and their base shortly after they turned around. The Japanese sank the oldest Russian ship, Rurik, and damaged Rossia and Gromoboi during the Battle off Ulsan, but both Russian ships were repaired within two months.

After the end of the war Rossia returned to Kronstadt where she underwent a three-year refit that strengthened her armament. She was fitted with mine rails in 1914 and laid one minefield during World War I that damaged two German light cruisers. She was reconstructed beginning in late 1915 to further strengthen her armament, but played no part during the rest of the war as her crew became involved in revolutionary activities in 1917. She was taken over by the Bolsheviks in late 1917, but was put into reserve in 1918 and sold for scrap in 1922.

== Design ==
Rossia was originally intended to be a repeat of the armored cruiser Rurik, but the Director of the Naval Ministry wanted the armor to cover more of the ship's side. However the design went through a number of changes during late 1892 and early 1893 and incorporated a number of technological advances that had recently become available. One notable change was the deletion of Rurik's sailing rig.

=== General characteristics ===
Rossia was 485 feet (147.8 m) long overall. She had a maximum beam of 68.6 feet (20.9 m) and a draught of 26.2 feet (8.0 m). She displaced 12,195 long tons (12,391 t), only 65 long tons (66 t) more than designed. Rossia was sheathed in wood and copper to reduce fouling. She was considered to be a good sea boat with a smooth roll—attributable to her tumblehome sides.

=== Propulsion ===
In an effort to extend her range, Rossia was built with an unusual machinery arrangement. One large vertical triple expansion (VTE) steam engine drove each of the outer propeller shafts while a small cruising VTE engine drove the center shaft. At full speed the center propeller had to be uncoupled as there was not enough steam to drive all three engines simultaneously; the outer propellers were uncoupled when cruising. The two main engines were designed for a total of 14,500 indicated horsepower (10,813 kW), but they developed 15,523 ihp (11,575 kW) on trials and drove the ship to a maximum speed of 19.74 knots (36.56 km/h; 22.72 mph). The cruising engine developed 2,500 ihp (1,864 kW). Thirty-two Belleville water-tube boilers provided steam for the engines.

She could carry a maximum of 2,200 long tons (2,235 t) of coal. This gave her a radius of action of 7,740 nautical miles (14,330 km; 8,910 mi) at 10 knots (19 km/h; 12 mph). In 1898, some of the first large warship trials of oil fuel were carried out.

=== Armament ===
Rossia's main armament consisted of four 8-inch (203 mm) 45-caliber Pattern 1892 guns, one at each end of the ship on each side, sponsoned out over the tumblehome of the ship's sides. They were protected by gun shields. The guns could be depressed to −5° and elevated to 18°. They fired 193.5-pound (87.8 kg) projectiles at a muzzle velocity of 2,950 feet per second (900 m/s) which gave a range of 12,000 yd (11,000 m) at 13° elevation.

Her secondary armament consisted of sixteen 6-inch (152 mm)/45 Pattern 1892 guns. One gun was mounted under the forecastle and another in the stern; neither gun could fire to the side. The remaining guns were mounted in hull embrasures. In their pivot mounts the guns could depress to -6° and elevate to +20°. They fired 91.4-pound (41.5 kg) Pattern 1907 high explosive projectiles at a muzzle velocity of 2,600 feet per second (790 m/s). This gave a range of 12,600 yd (11,500 m) at maximum elevation. Rossia carried 210 rounds per gun.

Defense against torpedo boats was provided by a variety of light-caliber weapons. Twelve 75-millimeter (3.0 in) Canet Pattern 1892 50-caliber guns were mounted in sponsons on the upper deck, protected by gun shields. The gun fired 10.8-pound (4.9 kg) shells to a range of about 8,600 yards (7,864 m) at its maximum elevation of 21° with a muzzle velocity of 2,700 ft/s (820 m/s). The rate of fire was between twelve and fifteen rounds per minute.

A total of twenty 47-millimeter (1.9 in) Hotchkiss guns were carried. They fired a 3.3-pound (1.5 kg) shell at a muzzle velocity of 1,476 ft/s (450 m/s) at a rate of 20 rounds per minute to a range of 2,020 yards (1,850 m). Eighteen 37-millimeter (1.5 in) Hotchkiss guns were also carried. They fired a 1.1-pound (0.50 kg) shell at a muzzle velocity of 1,450 ft/s (440 m/s) at a rate of 20 rounds per minute to a range of 3,038 yards (2,778 m).

Five above-water 15-inch (381 mm) torpedo tubes were mounted. The exact type of torpedo carried likely changed over Rossia's lifetime: the original fifteen-inch Whitehead torpedo only had a maximum range of 440 yards (402.3 m) at a speed of 29 knots (54 km/h; 33 mph) and a 57-pound (25.9 kg) warhead. These were later replaced by an improved model with two speed/range settings and a 141-pound (64.0 kg) warhead. Its maximum range was 980 yards (896.1 m) at a speed of 25 knots (46 km/h; 29 mph).

=== Armor ===
Rossia used newly developed Harvey armor which saved considerable weight over the steel armor used by Rurik for the same amount of protection. Her waterline belt extended from the stern to 80 feet (24.4 m) short of the bow. It extended 4 feet 6 inches (1.4 m) above the waterline and 4 feet (1.2 m) below the waterline. It was 8 inches (203 mm) thick amidships, but reduced to six inches fore and abaft the machinery spaces and to 5 inches (127 mm) at the stern. The belt tapered to a thickness of 4 inches (102 mm) at its lower edge. It was closed off at the forward end by a 7-inch (178 mm) transverse bulkhead. A protective 2.5–3-inch (64–76 mm) deck ran forward from the bulkhead to the bow. The main armored deck was 2 inches (51 mm) thick, but a five-inch glacis projected above it to protect the tops of the engine cylinders. The conning tower had walls 12 inches (305 mm) thick. The funnel uptakes were protected by 3 inches (76 mm) of armor between the lower and middle decks.

== Operational history ==
Rossia was built by the Baltic Works in Saint Petersburg. Construction began in October 1893 although she was not formally laid down until 20 May 1895 and launched on 30 April 1896. After her launch, she was towed to Kronstadt for fitting-out, but on 26 October, she was pushed onto a sandbar by a storm. She was refloated on 15 December. Rossia entered service in late 1896 and participated in Queen Victoria's Diamond Jubilee Fleet Review in June 1897 at Spithead. She returned to Kronstadt to finish her trials before sailing for the Far East in October. She reached Nagasaki, Japan on 10 March 1898 and remained in the Pacific until the beginning of the Russo-Japanese War in 1904.

=== Russo-Japanese War ===
Rossia and her observation balloon

At the start of the Russo-Japanese War, Rossia was under the command of Captain Andrei Parfenovich Andreev, and was the flagship of the Vladivostok Cruiser Squadron under the overall command of Rear Admiral Karl Jessen. The other ships in the squadron were the armored cruisers Gromoboi and Rurik as well as the protected cruiser Bogatyr. The squadron made a number of sorties against Japanese shipping early in the war, but only one was reasonably successful when the transport Hitachi Maru, carrying eighteen 28-centimeter (11 in) siege howitzers and over 1000 troops intended for the siege of Port Arthur, was sunk in June 1904. On an earlier sortie in May 1904 Rossia flew an observation balloon off her quarterdeck to (unsuccessfully) locate Japanese shipping; the first use of an aerial device by a warship on the high seas during a time of war.

==== Battle off Ulsan ====
During the war the bulk of the Russian Pacific Fleet was located in Port Arthur where they were blockaded by the Japanese. On 10 August 1904 the ships at Port Arthur attempted breakout to Vladivostok, but were turned back in the Battle of the Yellow Sea. Admiral Jessen was ordered to rendezvous with them, but the order was delayed and his ships had to raise steam, so he did not sortie until the evening of 13 August. Bogatyr had been damaged earlier when she grounded and did not sail with the squadron. By dawn he had reached the island of Tsushima in the Tsushima Strait between Korea and Japan. He turned back for Vladivostok when he failed to see any ships from the Port Arthur squadron. 36 miles (58 km) north of the island he encountered the Japanese squadron commanded by Vice Admiral Kamimura Hikonojō tasked to patrol the Tsushima Strait. The Japanese force had four modern armored cruisers, Iwate, Izumo, Tokiwa, and Azuma. The two squadrons had passed during the night without spotting the other and each had reversed course around first light. This put the Japanese ships astride the Russian route to Vladivostok.

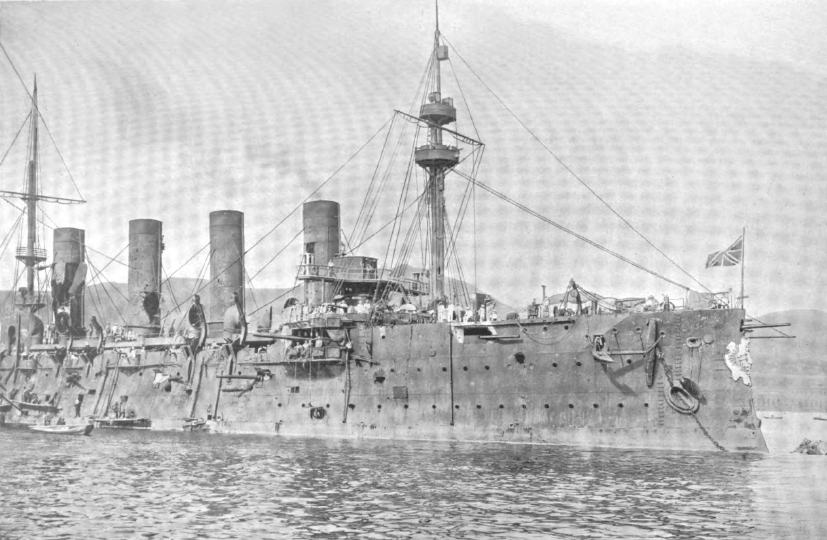
Rossia's right side after the Battle off Ulsan; note the holes in the ship

Admiral Jessen turned to the northeast when he spotted the Japanese at 5:00 a.m. and they followed suit, albeit on a slightly converging course. Both sides opened fire around 05:23 at a range of 8,500 meters (9,300 yd). The Japanese ships concentrated their fire on Rurik, the rear ship of the Russian formation. She was hit fairly quickly and began to fall astern of the other two ships. Admiral Jessen turned southeast in an attempt to open the range, but this blinded the Russian gunners and prevented any of their broadside guns from bearing on the Japanese. About 06:00 Admiral Jessen turned 180° to starboard in an attempt to reach the Korean coast and to allow Rurik to rejoin the squadron. Admiral Kamimura followed suit around 06:10, but turned to port, which opened the range between the squadrons. Azuma developed engine problems around this time so the Japanese squadron slowed to conform with her best speed. Firing recommenced at 06:24 and Rurik was hit three times in the stern, flooding her steering compartment so that she had to be steered with her engines. Her speed continued to decrease, further exposing her to Japanese fire, and her steering jammed to port around 06:40.

Admiral Jessen made another 180° turn in an attempt to interpose his two ships between the Japanese and Rurik, but the latter ship suddenly turn to starboard and increased speed and passed between Jessen's ships and the Japanese. Admiral Kamimura turned 180° as well so that both squadrons were heading southeast on parallel courses, but Admiral Jessen quickly made another 180° turn so that they headed on opposing courses. Iwate was hit around this time which knocked out three six-inch and one twelve-pounder guns, killing 32 and wounding 43. The Japanese squadron opened the range again when it made a 180° another turn to port. The Russians reversed course for the third time around 07:45 in another attempt to support Rurik although Rossia was on fire herself. Her fires were extinguished about twenty minutes later. Admiral Kamimura circled Rurik to the south at 08:00 and allowed the other two Russian ships to get to his north and gave them an uncontested route to Vladivostok. Despite this, Admiral Jessen turned back once more at 08:15 and ordered Rurik to make her own way back to Vladivostok before turning north at his maximum speed, about 18 knots (33 km/h; 21 mph).

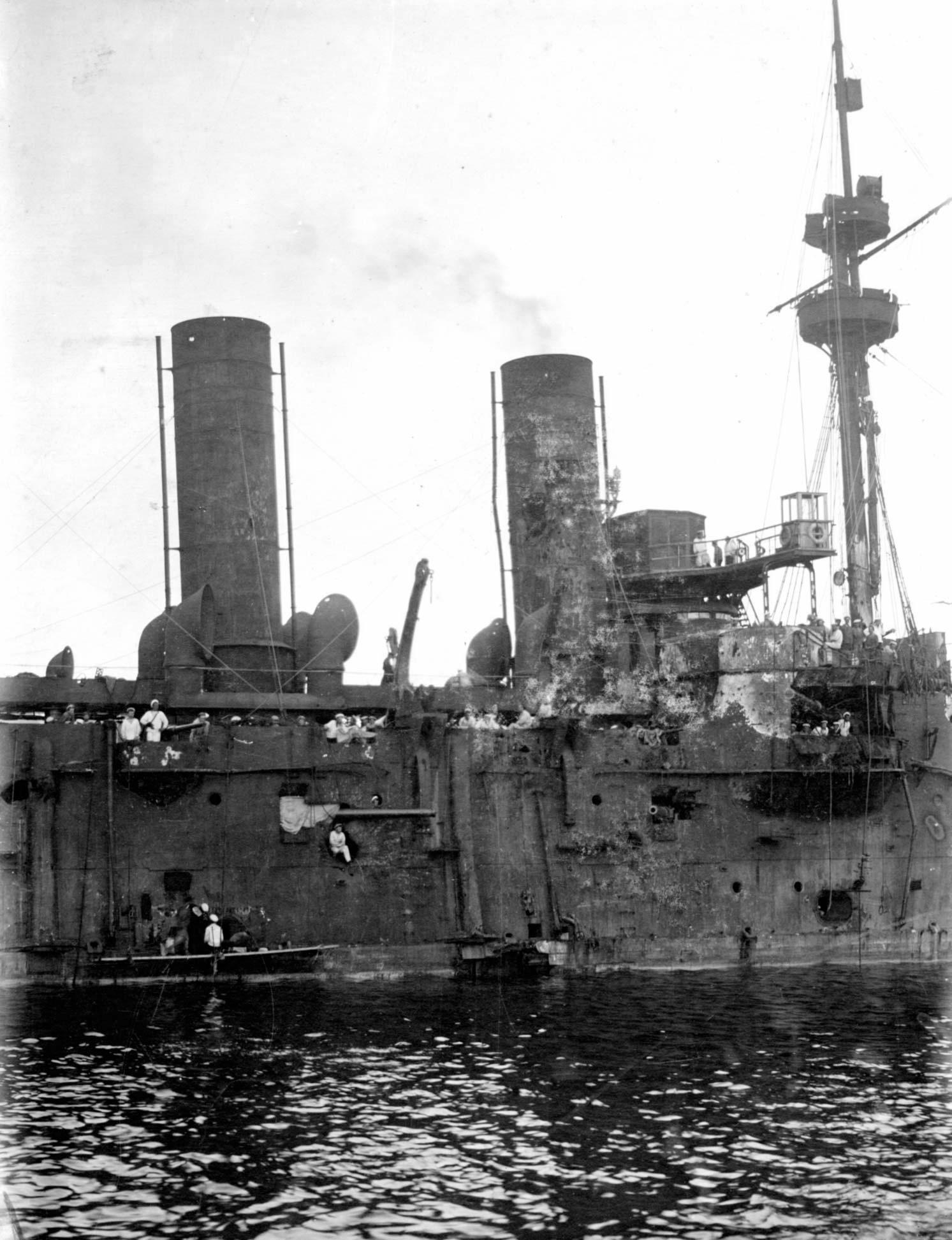
A close-up of Rossia's starboard side after the battle

About this time Admiral Kamimura's two elderly protected cruisers, Naniwa and Takachiho were approaching from the south. Their arrival allowed Kamimura to pursue Jessen with all of his armored cruisers. They fought a running battle with the Russians for the next hour and a half; scoring enough hits on them to force their speed down to 15 knots (28 km/h; 17 mph). Azuma's engines again broke down during this chase and she was replaced in the line by Tokiwa. The Japanese closed to a minimum of about 5,000 meters (5,500 yd), but Admiral Kamimura then opened the range up to 6,500 meters (7,100 yd).

About 10:00 Kamimura's gunnery officer erroneously informed him that Izumo had expended three-quarters of her ammunition and he turned back after a five-minute rapid-fire barrage. He did not wish to leave the Tsushima Strait unguarded and thought that he could expend his remaining ammunition on Rurik. By this time she had been sunk by Naniwa and Takachiho which had closed to 3,000 meters (3,300 yd) of Rurik in order to finish her off. They had radioed Admiral Kamimura that she was sunk, but he did not receive the message. Shortly after the Japanese turned back Gromoboi and Rossia were forced to heave-to to make repairs.

Rossia suffered only 44 dead and 156 wounded; far less than Gromoboi's 87 dead and 170 wounded. This was attributable to Rossia's captain's policy of ordering the gun crews for his quick-firing guns on the engaged side to lay down and those on the unengaged side to go below, in contrast to the other ship keeping her light guns manned at all times. Rossia had been hit nineteen times on the starboard side of her hull and nine on her port side, plus other hits in her funnels, boats and decks. She had half of her guns knocked out and a fire caused by the ignition of excess propellant charges. Despite this number of hits, she was not badly damaged because her waterline belt was not penetrated by any hit. She was repaired within two months by the rudimentary facilities available at Vladivostok. Rossia made no further effort to interfere with Japanese shipping during the war.

=== Interwar period ===
Rossia returned to Kronstadt, arriving on 8 April 1906, where she was given a lengthy refit that was finished in 1909. Her engines and boilers were reconditioned, her mainmast was removed and she received additional six-inch guns. Six more guns in lightly armored casemates were added on the upper deck, positioned on each side in the intervals between the main-deck six-inch guns. In addition the bow gun was moved to the upper deck to allow it to fire to each side. This increased the ship's broadside by four guns.

Rossia represented Russia at King George V's Coronation Fleet Review in June 1911. She departed Kronstadt in September 1912 for a training cruise to the Canaries and the Virgin Islands, returning to the Baltic in time to visit Copenhagen in March 1913 in company with the protected cruisers Aurora and Oleg. She left for another training cruise to the Azores in September 1913 and was cruising in the Mediterranean in April 1914.

Rossia after the 1905 refit.

=== World War I ===
Rossia served as the flagship of the 2nd Cruiser Brigade of the Baltic Fleet during World War I. She was modified to serve as a fast minelayer with a capacity of one hundred naval mines before the war. In January 1915 she laid a minefield in company with Oleg and Bogatyr between Kiel and the Mecklenburg coast that damaged the German light cruisers SMS Augsburg and SMS Gazelle. She was reconstructed beginning in October 1915 at Kronstadt to increase her armament. Her forecastle deck was removed as well as the fore and aft six-inch guns. They were replaced by two eight-inch guns mounted on the centerline forward and another pair was mounted on the quarterdeck. These additions increased her broadside to six eight-inch, but only seven six-inch guns.

Rossia's crew took an active part in the revolutionary movements in 1917 and came under control of the Soviet Red Fleet in September 1917. The Treaty of Brest-Litovsk required the Soviets to evacuate their base at Helsinki in March 1918 or have them interned by newly independent Finland even though the Gulf of Finland was still frozen over. Rossia sailed to Kronstadt in what became known as the 'Ice Voyage' and was placed into reserve shortly after her arrival. She was sold to a German company for scrapping on 1 July 1922. While being towed to Germany in the Baltic Sea, she broke free from her tow and ran aground on the Dyvelseye Shoal on the coast of Estonia on 16 October 1922. She was refloated in August 1923, towed to Kiel, and broken up.
