= Dewa Shigetō =

Japanese admiral (1856–1930)

Baron Dewa Shigetō
- 出羽 重遠
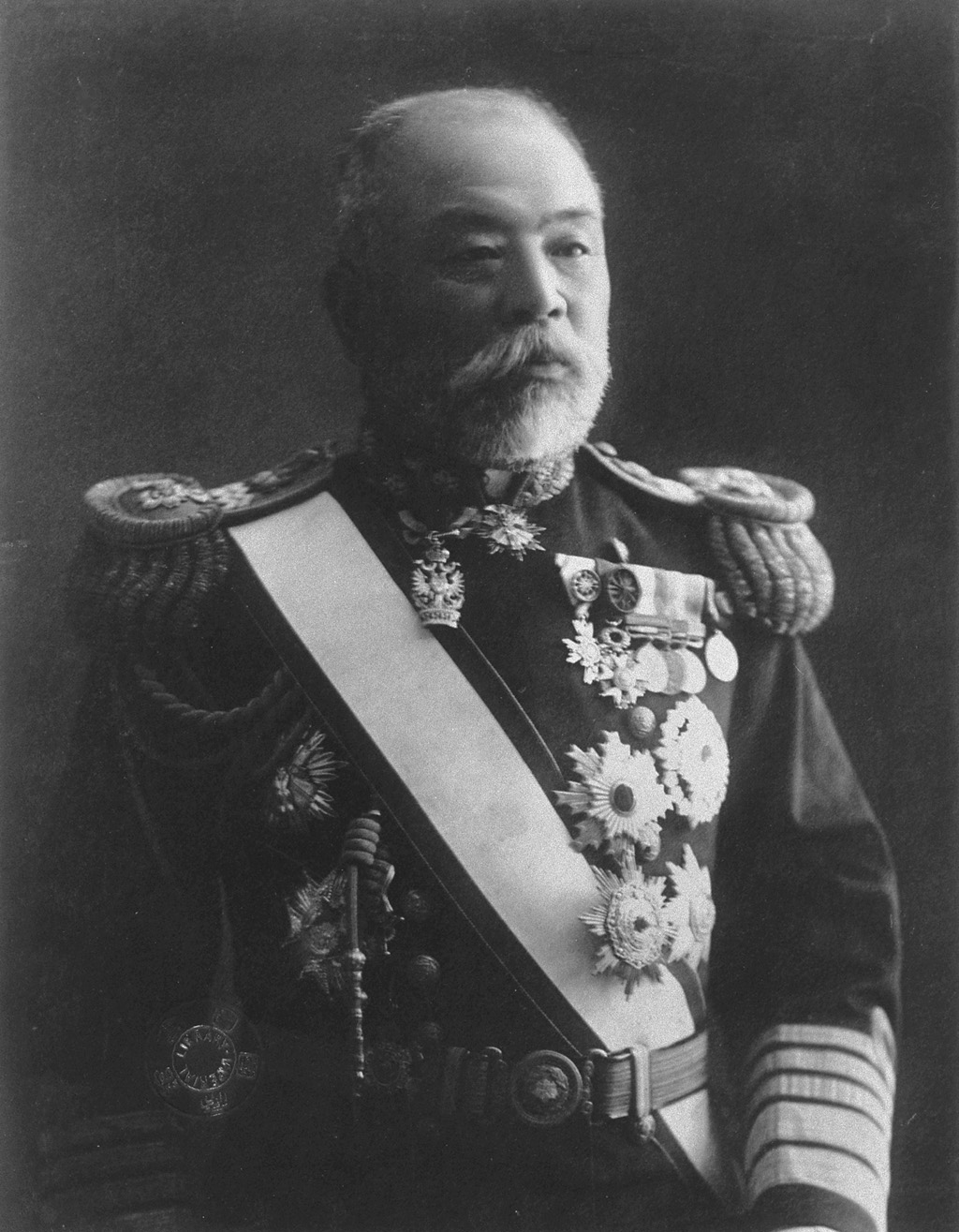
- Born: 10 December 1856; Aizu, Japan
- Died: 27 January 1930 (aged 73); Tokyo, Japan
- Military career
- Allegiance: Empire of Japan
- Branch: Imperial Japanese Navy
- Service years: 1878–1925
- Rank: Admiral
- Commands: Tokiwa; 3rd Squadron of IJN 1st Fleet; IJN 3rd Fleet, Director of the Naval Education Bureau, IJN 2nd Fleet, Sasebo Naval District, IJN 1st Fleet.
- Conflicts: Boshin War; Battle of Aizu; First Sino-Japanese War; Russo-Japanese War; Battle of Port Arthur; Battle of the Yellow Sea; Battle of Tsushima
- Awards: Order of the Rising Sun, 1st Class

Baron Dewa Shigetō (出羽 重遠; 10 December 1856 – 27 January 1930) was a Japanese admiral in the early days of the Imperial Japanese Navy.

== Biography ==
Dewa was born as the son of a samurai of the Aizu domain (present day Fukushima prefecture). As a youth, he enlisted in the Byakkotai, a reserve unit of the Aizu domain's official military. The Byakkotai was called into action, and Dewa served at the Battle of Aizu in the Boshin War.

Dewa attended the 5th class of the Imperial Japanese Naval Academy, graduating 6th out of 43 cadets. He was appointed a midshipman on 16 August 1878, promoted to ensign on 12 August 1880 and promoted to sub-lieutenant on 27 February 1883. He served as a junior officer on several vessels of the early Japanese Navy, including the corvette Tsukuba, ironclad warship Fusō, sloop Hōshō, ironclad warship Ryūjō, corvette Amagi, and cruisers Asama, Naniwa and Takachiho. He was promoted to lieutenant on 7 April 1886 and to lieutenant-commander on 16 October 1890. From 1886-1890, he was executive officer on the cruiser Takao. From 1893-1893, he was captain of the gunboats Akagi, and Tatsuta and was promoted in rank to captain on 7 December 1894.

During the First Sino-Japanese War (1894–95), Dewa served as a staff officer of the "Western Seas Fleet", a defensive force patrolling home waters. In 1893, he became Director of the Personnel Section in the Navy Ministry. He later captained the cruiser Tokiwa in 1898.

Promoted to rear admiral on 20 May 1900, and vice admiral on 6 June 1904, during the Russo-Japanese War he was a commander of the 3rd Cruiser Squadron of the IJN 1st Fleet and took part in the naval Battle of Port Arthur, and the Battle of the Yellow Sea, (where he commanded from the cruiser Yakumo). During the decisive Battle of Tsushima he led the Third Squadron from his flagship, the cruiser Kasagi.

In December 1905, he was appointed Commander-in-Chief of the IJN 3rd Fleet, and from November 1906 was Director of the Naval Education Bureau.

On 3 December 1907, Dewa was elevated to the peerage with the title of danshaku (baron) under the kazoku system.

Later, he was successively Commander-in-Chief of the IJN 2nd Fleet, Sasebo Naval District, and the IJN 1st Fleet.

On 9 July 1912, he was promoted to full admiral. Dewa Shigeto was the first non-Satsuma person (and the first Aizu person) to attain the rank of full admiral in the Imperial Japanese Navy. The first person of Aizu background to attain the rank of admiral was Hidematsu Tsunoda, and Matsudaira Morio the son of the former Aizu lord Matsudaira Katamori as a rear admiral.

On the occasion of the Siemens-Vickers Navy Armament Scandal, as Chairman of the Commission of Inquiry he concentrated his efforts on the cleanup of corruption from the Navy. This eventually led to the fall of Admiral Yamamoto Gonnohyōe's cabinet in March 1914. Dewa retired from active service in 1925.

In his later years, Dewa was involved with the construction of memorials to the casualties of the Battle of Aizu. His grave is at the Aoyama Cemetery in Tokyo.

== Honors ==
From the article in the Japanese Wikipedia

- Order of the Sacred Treasure, 4th Class
- Grand Cordon of the Order of the Rising Sun (1 April 1906)
- Order of the Golden Kite, 2nd Class (1 April 1906)
- Baron (21 September 1907)
- Grand Cordon of the Order of the Rising Sun with Paulownia Flowers (27 January 1930; posthumous)
- Grand Cordon of the Order of the Plum Blossoms of the Korean Empire

== Notes ==
Military offices
Preceded by Samejima Kazunori	Combined Fleet; Chief-of-staff; 17 December 1894 - 25 July 1895	Succeeded by Kamimura Hikonojō
Fleet Created	4th Fleet; Commander-in-chief; 14 June 1905 – 20 December 1905	Fleet dissolved, post next held by Toyoda Soemu
Preceded by Kamimura Hikonojō	2nd Fleet; Commander-in-chief; 20 December 1905 – 22 November 1906	Succeeded by Ijūin Gorō
Preceded by Ijūin Gorō	2nd Fleet; Commander-in-chief; 26 May 1908 – 1 December 1909	Succeeded by Yoshimatsu Shigetarō
Preceded by Arima Shinichi	Sasebo Naval District; Commander-in-chief; 1 December 1909 - 1 December 1911	Succeeded by Shimamura Hayao
Preceded by Kamimura Hikonojō	1st Fleet; Commander-in-chief; 1 December 1911 – 1 December 1913	Succeeded by Katō Tomosaburō
