= Russian cruiser Bogatyr =

Russian Navy protected cruiser (1902–1918)

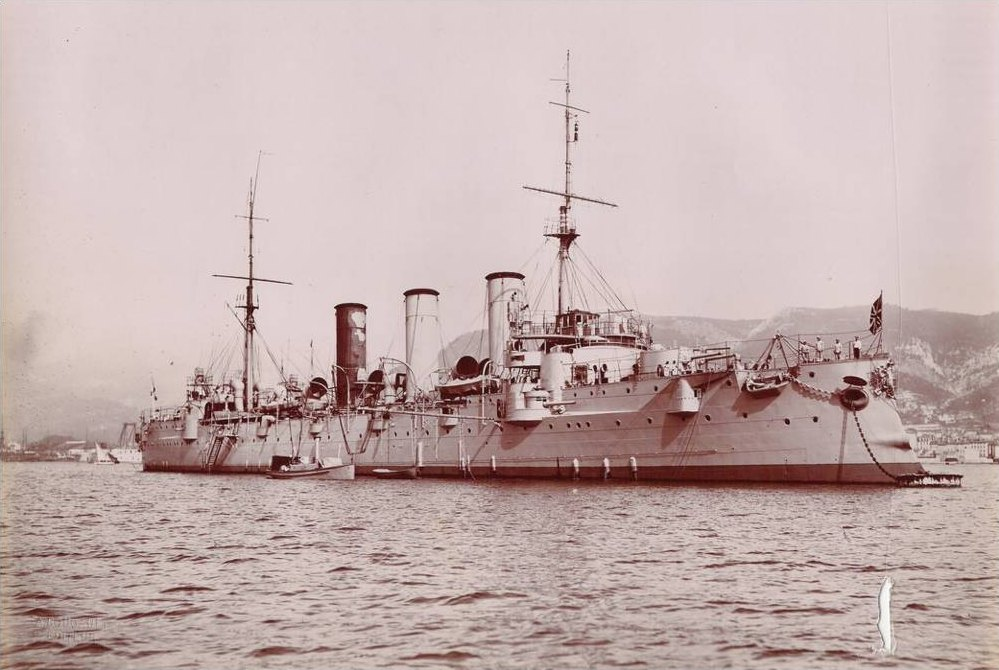
- Bogatyr

History

Russian Empire
- Name: Bogatyr
- Builder: Vulcan Stettin
- Yard number: 247
- Laid down: 22 December 1899
- Launched: 30 July 1901
- Commissioned: 20 August 1902
- Decommissioned: 1918
- Renamed: 1918
- Fate: Scrapped, 1922

General characteristics
- Class & type: Bogatyr-class protected cruiser
- Displacement: 5910 tons (full load)
- Length: 134 m (439 ft 8 in)
- Beam: 16.6 m (54 ft 6 in)
- Draught: 6.29 m (20 ft 8 in)
- Installed power: 16 Normand-Sigaudy boilers; 23,000 ihp (17,000 kW)
- Propulsion: 2 shafts; triple-expansion steam engines
- Speed: 23 knots (43 km/h; 26 mph)
- Range: 3,000 nautical miles (5,556 km; 3,452 mi) at 12 knots (22 km/h; 14 mph)
- Complement: 581 officers and crewmen
- Armament: 4 – 152 mm (6 in) Canet guns in turrets; 8 – 152 mm (6 in)/L45 Canet guns in casemates; 12 – 75 mm (3 in) Canet guns; 8 – 47 mm (2 in) Canet guns; 2 – 37 mm (1 in) Hotchkiss machine guns; 4 – 380 mm (15 in) torpedo tubes
- Armour: Sloping deck: 35–70 mm (1–3 in); Conning tower: 140-millimetre (6 in)

The cruiser Bogatyr (Russian: Богаты́рь), launched 1901, was the lead ship of the Bogatyr class of four protected cruisers built between 1898 and 1907 for the Imperial Russian Navy.

== Background ==
After the completion of the Pallada class, the Russian Navy issued requirements for three large protected cruisers to three separate companies: Varyag was ordered from William Cramp & Sons in Philadelphia, United States, Askold was ordered from Krupp-Germaniawerft in Kiel, Germany, and Bogatyr from Vulcan Stettin, also in Germany. Although Askold was the fastest cruiser in the Russian fleet at the time of its commissioning, Bogatyr was selected for further development into a new class of ships.

== Operational history ==
Bogatyr was laid down at the AG Vulcan Stettin shipyards in Stettin, Germany on 22 December 1899, launched on 30 January 1901 and commissioned on 20 August 1902. She initially entered service with the Russian Baltic Fleet.

=== During the Russo-Japanese War ===
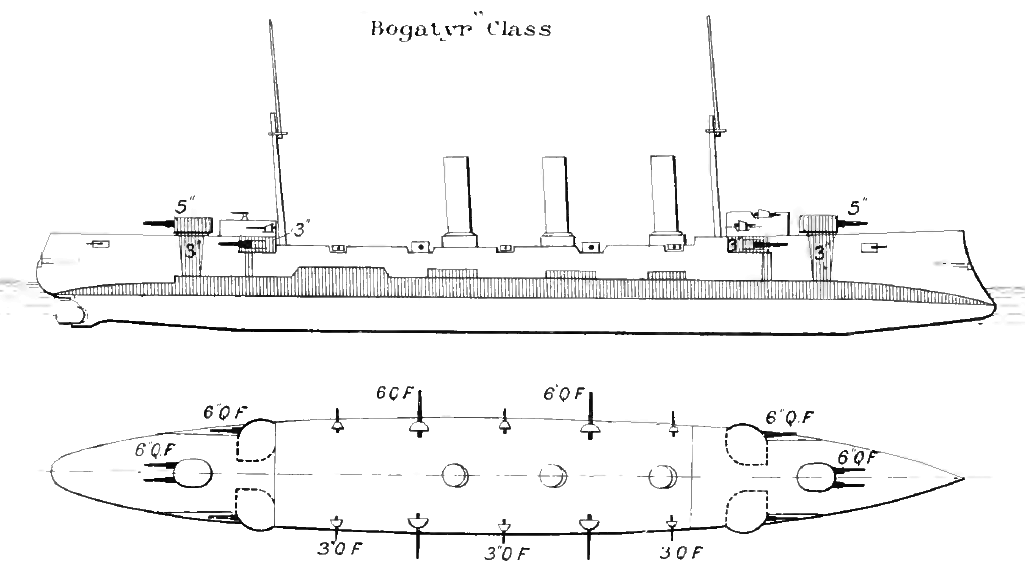
Line drawing of the Bogatyr showing armament layout.

At the start of the Russo-Japanese War of 1904–1905, Bogatyr was stationed at Vladivostok with the Russian Pacific Fleet's cruiser squadron under the overall command of Rear Admiral Karl Jessen. This squadron operated in the Sea of Japan and in waters near the Japanese home islands for commerce raiding and reconnaissance. During the first months of the war, the squadron made a number of sorties against Japanese shipping, but only one was reasonably successful when the merchant vessel Hitachi Maru, carrying eighteen 28-centimeter (11 in) siege howitzers and over 1000 troops intended for the siege of Port Arthur, was sunk in June 1904. In response, the Imperial Japanese Navy assigned Vice Admiral Kamimura Hikonojō with a squadron of eight cruisers to pursue and destroy the Russian squadron.

However, on 15 May 1904, Bogatyr struck a rock in Amur Bay, and was so badly damaged that she could not be adequately repaired for the remainder of the war, and largely remained docked at Vladivostok.

After the end of the war, Bogatyr was repaired, and reassigned to the Russian Baltic Fleet. Bogatyr was deployed in the Mediterranean when a large earthquake struck Sicily on 28 December 1908. Together with the Slava, Tsesarevich, and Admiral Makarov, Bogatyr assisted rescue efforts at Messina. Some crewmen were killed by aftershocks while attempting to rescue people from the rubble. In 1912, Bogatyr underwent a complete refit and modernization program at Kronstadt.

=== World War I service ===
At the start of World War I, Bogatyr was part of the Russian 1st Cruiser Brigade in the Baltic Sea. On 26 August 1914, together with Pallada, she captured the German light cruiser SMS Magdeburg off of Osmussaar on the north coast of Estonia. The German crew scuttled their ship to avoid capture, but the German captain, Lieutenant-Commander Habenicht was captured by the Russians, together with the German code book. For the remainder of the year and early into 1915, Bogatyr covered minelaying operations in the Baltic, as well as laying mines herself. Mines laid by Bogatyr are credited with sinking the German light cruiser SMS Augsburg off Bornholm.

On 2 July 1915, Bogatyr participated in the Battle of Åland Islands during which she drove the German light cruiser SMS Albatross onto the beach. In late 1915, she was refit and repaired in Kronstadt, and her main armament was upgraded to 130 mm/55 B7 Pattern 1913 guns. Through 1916, she mostly operated in the Baltic, off the coasts of Finland and Sweden, to interdict German convoys.

Following the November Revolution, the crew of Bogatyr declared for the Bolshevik cause, and the ship joined the Red Navy. After the armistice with Germany in December 1917, Bogatyr was demobilized at Helsinki. The Treaty of Brest-Litovsk required the Soviets to evacuate their base at Helsinki in March 1918 or have them interned by newly independent Finland even though the Gulf of Finland was still frozen over. Bogatyr sailed to Kronstadt in what became known as the 'Ice Voyage', and was placed into reserve shortly after her arrival.

In 1922, as with many ships of the former Imperial Russian Navy, Bogatyr was scrapped in Germany.

== Sources ==
- Brook, Peter (2000). "Armoured Cruiser vs. Armoured Cruiser: Ulsan 14 August 1904". In Preston, Antony (ed.). Warship 2000–2001. London: Conway Maritime Press. ISBN 0-85177-791-0.
- Budzbon, Przemysław (1985). "Russia". In Gray, Randal (ed.). Conway's All the World's Fighting Ships 1906–1921. Annapolis, Maryland: Naval Institute Press. pp. 291–325. ISBN 0-85177-245-5.
- Campbell, N. J. M. (1979). "Russia". In Chesneau, Roger & Kolesnik, Eugene M. (eds.). Conway's All the World's Fighting Ships 1860–1905. New York: Mayflower Books. pp. 170–217. ISBN 0-8317-0302-4.
- Caruana, J. & Wetherhorn, Aryeh (1998). "Question 27/97: Vladivostok at War". Warship International. XXXV (3). International Naval Research Organization: 314. ISSN 0043-0374.
- Frampton, Victor; Head, Michael; McLaughlin, Stephen & Spurgeon, H. L. (2003). "Russian Warships off Tokyo Bay". Warship International. XL (2): 119–125. ISSN 0043-0374.
- Harris, Mark (2025). The First World War in the Baltic Sea. Vol. 1: Essen's Triumph, 1914 to February 1915. Helion. ISBN 978-1-804519-10-3.
- McLaughlin, Stephen (1999). "From Ruirik to Ruirik: Russia's Armoured Cruisers". In Preston, Antony (ed.). Warship 1999–2000. London: Conway Maritime Press. ISBN 0-85177-724-4.
- Watts, Anthony J. (1990). The Imperial Russian Navy. London: Arms and Armour. ISBN 0-85368-912-1.
