= Kamimura Hikonojō =

Japanese admiral (1849-1916)

Baron Kamimura Hikonojō
- 上村 彦之丞
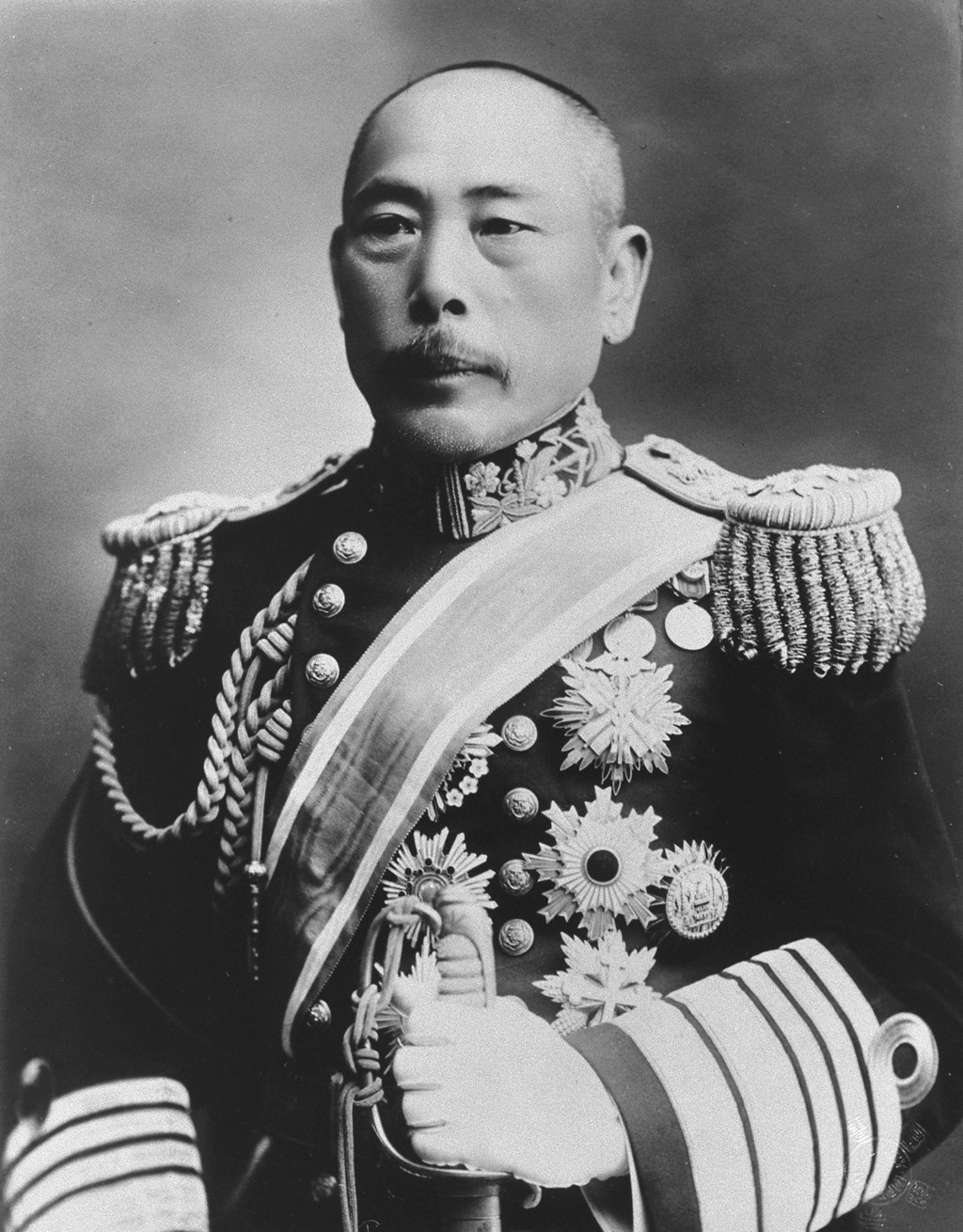
- Born: 1 May 1849; Kagoshima, Satsuma Domain
- Died: 8 August 1916 (aged 67); Kamakura, Japan
- Military career
- Allegiance: Empire of Japan
- Branch: Imperial Japanese Navy
- Service years: 1871–1914
- Rank: Admiral
- Commands: Maya, Chōkai, Akitsushima, 2nd Fleet, Yokosuka Naval District, 1st Fleet
- Conflicts: Boshin War; First Sino-Japanese War; Battle of the Yalu River (1894); Russo-Japanese War; Battle off Ulsan; Battle of Tsushima
- Other work: Supreme War Council

Baron Kamimura Hikonojō (上村 彦之丞; 1 May 1849 – 8 August 1916) was an early Japanese admiral of the Imperial Japanese Navy, commanding the IJN 2nd Fleet during the Russo-Japanese War, most notably at the Battle off Ulsan and Tsushima.

== Biography ==
Born to a samurai family in the Satsuma Domain (present-day Kagoshima Prefecture), Kamimura served as a foot soldier during the Boshin War. After the Imperial government was established in 1871, Kamimura became one of the first cadets of the Imperial Japanese Naval Academy, later earning a commission as an ensign following his graduation in 1879.

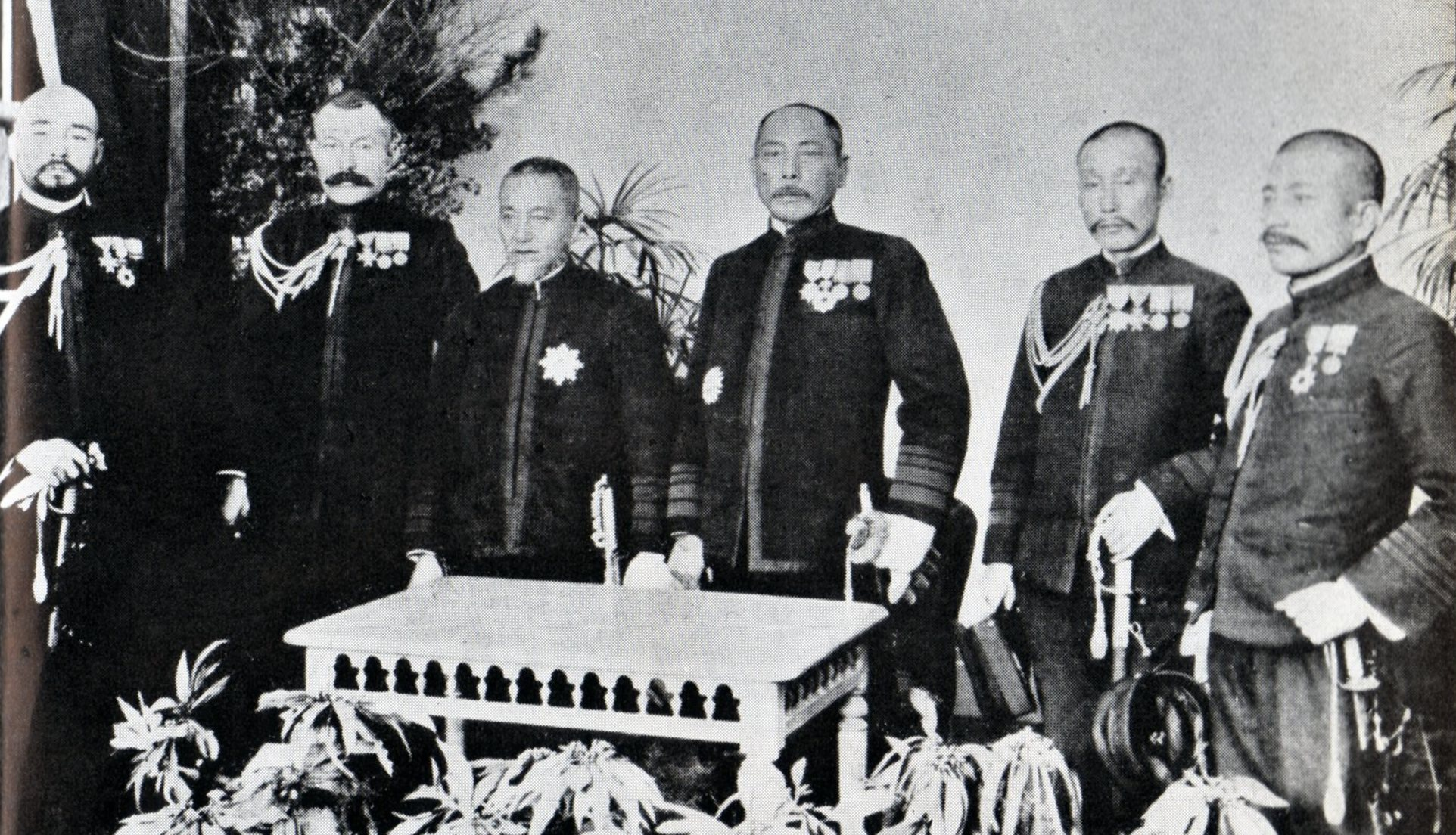
Left to right Funakoshi, Shimamura, Togo, Kamimura, Katō, Akiyama

Serving as a junior officer aboard various ships throughout the 1880s, Kamimura’s first command was the gunboat Maya in 1891; he later captained the Chōkai in 1893.

After the outbreak of the First Sino-Japanese War the following year, Kamimura was given command of the new cruiser Akitsushima, winning distinction at the Battle of the Yalu River on 17 September 1894. He was known in the Imperial Navy as a bold combat leader in the old samurai tradition.

In the years following the war, Kamimura held a series of posts in the Navy Ministry as well as staff and fleet commands until his promotion to vice admiral in 1903. He visited Great Britain aboard the battleship Asahi from 1 February 1899 – 22 May 1900, during which time he became a rear admiral.

Placed in command of the IJN 2nd Fleet following the first months of the Russo-Japanese War, Kamimura was ordered to contain the Russian cruiser squadron based in Vladivostok. After the Russians escaped and sank Japanese troopships in the Sea of Japan (April and June 1904), he became the object of widespread popular dissatisfaction, with a mob attacking his Tokyo residence, and newspapers hinting that he should commit suicide. He vindicated himself in action by sinking the Russian cruiser Rurik and damaging the cruisers Gromoboi and Rossia on 14 August 1904 at the Battle off Ulsan, and regained his popularity both within the government and the Japanese public. Commanding from the cruiser Izumo, Kamimura later led the IJN 2nd Fleet during the Battle of Tsushima on 27 May 1905.

Appointed commander of the Yokosuka Naval Base in 1905, Kamimura was placed in command of the IJN 1st Fleet in 1909. Previously made a danshaku (baron) under the kazoku peerage system only two years before, Kamimura was made a full admiral on 1 December 1910. Becoming a member of the Supreme War Council the following year, Kamimura entered the reserve list on 1 May 1914, before his death on 8 August 1916.

His grave is at the temple of Myōhon-ji in Kamakura.

== Promotions ==
- 8 June 1877 – Midshipman (Shoi-Kohosei)
- 19 September 1879 – Acting Sub-Lieutenant (Shōi)
- 17 December 1881 – Sub-Lieutenant (Chūi)
- 8 April 1884 – Lieutenant (Taii)
- 17 September 1890 – Lieutenant-Commander (Shōsa)
- 7 December 1894 – Captain (Taisa)
- 26 September 1899 – Rear Admiral (Shosho)
- 5 September 1903 – Vice Admiral (Chujo)
- 1 December 1910 – Admiral (Taisho)

== Honours ==
=== Peerages ===
- Baron (21 September 1907)

=== Decorations ===
- Grand Cordon of the Order of the Sacred Treasure (30 May 1905; Second Class: 27 December 1901; Fourth Class: 25 November 1897; Fifth Class: 24 November 1894; Sixth Class: 22 November 1889)
- Order of the Golden Kite, 1st Class (1 April 1906; Fourth Class: 27 September 1895)
- Grand Cordon of the Order of the Rising Sun (1 April 1906; Fifth Class: 27 September 1895)
- Grand Cordon of the Order of the Rising Sun with Paulownia Flowers (8 August 1916; posthumous)

== Notes ==
Military offices
Preceded by Dewa Shigetō	Combined Fleet; Chief-of-staff; 25 July 1895 - 16 November 1895	Fleet dissolved, post next held by Shimamura Hayao
Fleet created	2nd Fleet; Commander-in-chief; 27 October 1903 – 20 December 1905	Succeeded by Dewa Shigetō
Preceded by Inoue Yoshika	Yokosuka Naval District; Commander-in-chief; 20 December 1905 - 1 March 1909	Succeeded by Uryū Sotokichi
Preceded by Ijūin Gorō	1st Fleet; Commander-in-chief; 1 December 1909 – 1 December 1911	Succeeded by Dewa Shigetō
