= SS Hitachi Maru =

SS Hitachi Maru is the name of the following ships:

- SS Hitachi Maru (1898), sunk in February 1904 while transporting Japanese troops in the Hitachi Maru incident
- SS Hitachi Maru (1906), captured 6 November 1917 and scuttled
- Japanese ammunition ship Hitachi Maru, completed in 1939, requisitioned by Japanese Navy 1941, bombed by U.S. aircraft and sunk 14 February 1943
