= Japanese sloop Hōshō =

Imperial Japanese ship built in Scotland

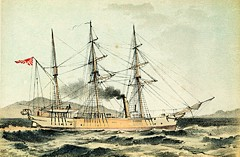
- Painting of Hōshō from 1895 book

History

Japan
- Name: Hōshō
- Builder: United Kingdom
- Laid down: 1868
- Launched: 1868
- Completed: 1869
- Commissioned: July 4, 1871
- Out of service: 1898
- Stricken: April 19, 1906
- Fate: Scrapped April 9, 1907

General characteristics
- Displacement: 321 long tons (326 t)
- Length: 35.7 m (117 ft)
- Beam: 7.37 m (24 ft 2 in)
- Draught: 2.44 m (8 ft)
- Propulsion: Reciprocating steam engine, 110 ihp (82 kW)
- Speed: 11 knots (13 mph; 20 km/h)
- Range: 810 tons charcoal
- Complement: 65
- Armament: 1 × 178 mm (7 in) muzzle-loading cannon (forward); 1 × 140 mm (5.5 in) muzzle-loading cannon (aft)

Hōshō (鳳翔, Flying Phoenix) was a screw sloop, originally built in the United Kingdom for Chōshū Domain in western Japan, and subsequently served in the early Imperial Japanese Navy.

== History ==
Hōshō was built in 1868 in Aberdeen, Scotland as a wooden-hulled three-masted bark-rigged sloop-of-war with a coal-fired triple expansion reciprocating steam engine with two boilers driving a single screw. She arrived in Japan in 1869, and was named Hōshō Maru (鳳翔 丸) by Chōshū Domain authorities. She served during the Boshin War of the Meiji Restoration, and was famous for allowing 330 Satsuma rōnin agitators to escape from Shinagawa, Edo in January 1868, despite efforts by the Tokugawa shogunate to prevent their escape. She was transferred to the fledgling Imperial Japanese Navy on May 15, 1871.

On June 8, 1871, the Meiji government renamed the vessel Hōshō . The ship was sent to support government operations during the Saga Rebellion in 1874, and was one of the ships in the Japanese fleet during the Taiwan Expedition of 1874. In 1877, Hōshō provided support to government forces during the Satsuma Rebellion.

On August 16, 1881, Hōshō was removed from frontline combat duty and was reassigned as a training vessel. During the First Sino-Japanese War, she was assigned to be a guard vessel, initially at Kure Naval Base, but later at Sasebo Naval Base. She was re-designated as a second-class gunboat on March 21, 1898, and was used for coastal patrol duties; however, she was declared obsolete and removed from service on Mar 1, 1898. It was struck from the navy list on April 19, 1906. It was scrapped on April 8, 1907.
