= Japanese cruiser Takachiho =

Japanese Naniwa-class protected cruiser

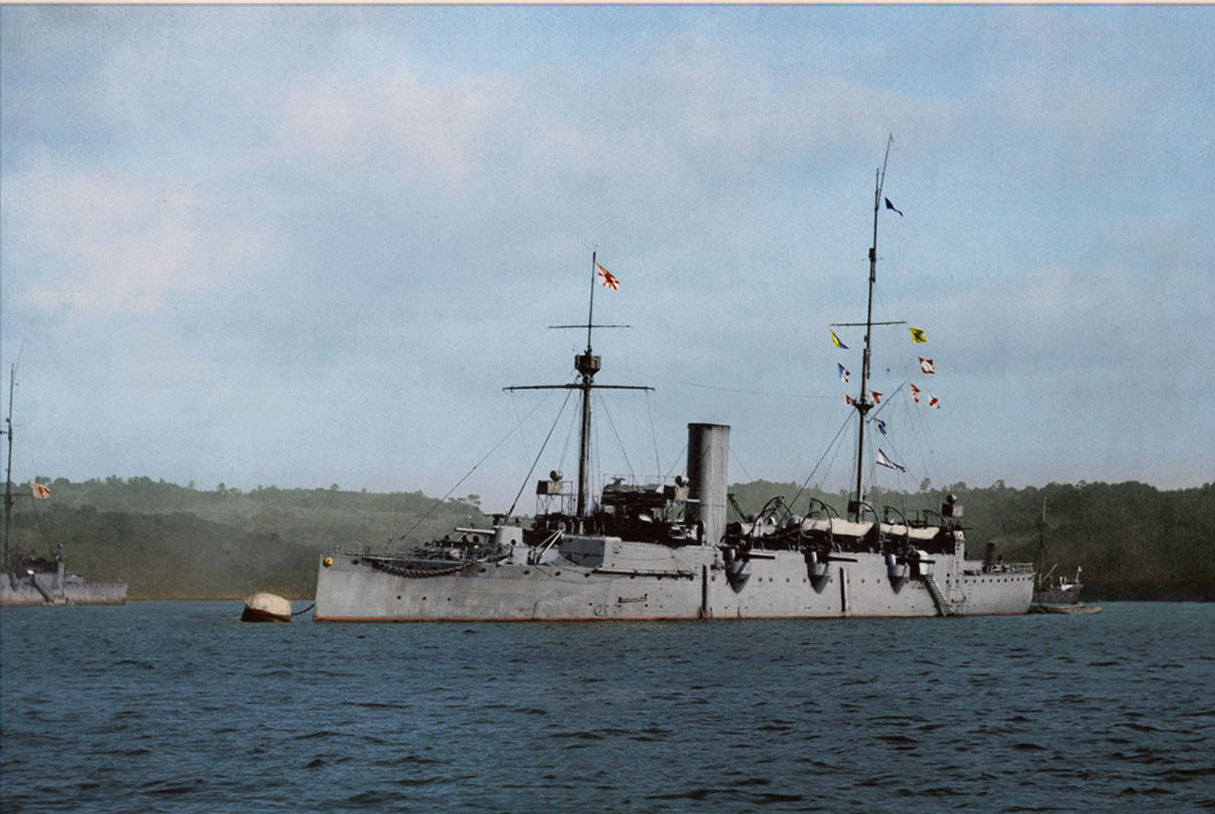
- Takachiho in Sasebo, 14 February 1905

History

Empire of Japan
- Name: Takachiho
- Namesake: Takachiho-gawara
- Ordered: 22 March 1884
- Builder: Armstrong Mitchell, South Tyneside
- Laid down: 10 April 1884
- Launched: 16 May 1885
- Completed: 26 March 1886
- Reclassified: As a minelayer, 1911
- Stricken: 29 October 1914
- Fate: Sunk by torpedo, 17–18 October 1914

General characteristics (as built)
- Class & type: Naniwa-class protected cruiser
- Displacement: 3,727 long tons (3,787 t)
- Length: 320 ft (97.5 m) (o/a)
- Beam: 46 ft (14 m)
- Draft: 20 ft 3 in (6.2 m) (full load)
- Installed power: 6 cylindrical boilers; 7,500 ihp (5,593 kW)
- Propulsion: 2 shafts; 2 double-expansion steam engines
- Speed: 18 knots (33 km/h; 21 mph)
- Range: 9,000 nmi (17,000 km; 10,000 mi) at 13 knots (24 km/h; 15 mph)
- Complement: 342
- Armament: 2 × single 26 cm (10.2 in) guns; 6 × single 15 cm (5.9 in) guns; 2 × single 3 pdr (47 mm (1.9 in)) guns; 10 × quadruple 1 in (25 mm) guns; 4 × 10-barrel 11 mm (0.43 in) guns; 4 × 14 in (356 mm) torpedo tubes
- Armour: Deck: 2–3 in (51–76 mm); Conning tower: 3 in (76 mm)

Takachiho (高千穂) was the second and last Naniwa-class protected cruiser built for the Imperial Japanese Navy (IJN) in the 1880s. As Japan lacked the industrial capacity to construct such vessels, the ship was designed and built in the United Kingdom. She participated in the First Sino-Japanese War of 1894–1895, playing a major role in the Battle of the Yalu River and lesser roles in the Battles of Port Arthur, Weihaiwei, the Pescadores Campaign and the invasion of Taiwan. Takachiho played a minor role in the Russo-Japanese War of 1904–1905 where she participated in the Battle of Chemulpo Bay, briefly helped to blockade Port Arthur at the beginning of the war, helped to sink a Russian armored cruiser during Battle off Ulsan and participated in the climatic defeat of the Imperial Russian Navy in the Battle of Tsushima.

The ship was relegated to auxiliary roles as a depot ship and a training ship after the war and was converted into a minelayer in 1911. Takachiho was torpedoed and sunk by a German torpedo boat in 1914 during the Siege of Tsingtao in World War I with the loss of most of her crew.

== Design and description ==
The Naniwa-class cruisers were designed by Armstrong Mitchell's chief naval architect, William White, as improved versions of the pioneering Chilean protected cruiser Esmeralda (later purchased by the IJN and renamed Izumi) and the Royal Navy's equivalent Mersey-class ships. When completed, Takachiho and her sister ship, Naniwa, were considered the most advanced and most powerful cruisers in the world. The cruisers displaced 3,727 long tons (3,787 t) at normal load. The ships had a length between perpendiculars of 300 feet (91.4 m) and an overall length of 320 feet (97.5 m), a beam of 46 feet (14 m) and a draft of 20 feet 3 inches (6.2 m) at deep load. The cruisers were fitted with a plough-shaped naval ram of mild steel below the waterline and had a partial double bottom extending between the forward and aft magazines. They were powered by a pair of horizontal, two-cylinder double-expansion steam engines, each driving one shaft using steam produced by six cylindrical boilers. The engines were designed to produce a total of 7,500 indicated horsepower (5,600 kW) with forced draught to give the ships a maximum speed of 18 knots (33 km/h; 21 mph). During her speed trials after arriving in Japan, Takachiho reached a speed of 18.77 knots (34.76 km/h; 21.60 mph) from 7,604 ihp (5,670 kW). The Naniwa-class cruisers carried enough coal to gave them a range of about 9,000 nautical miles (17,000 km; 10,000 mi) at a speed of 13 knots (24 km/h; 15 mph). Takachiho's crew consisted of 342 officers and men.

The main armament of the Naniwa-class ships initially consisted of two single 26-centimeter (10.2 in) Krupp cannon on pivot mounts in barbettes fore and aft of the superstructure. Each barbette was fitted with a fixed loading station in its rear and the guns had to return to this position to reload. The secondary armament was initially six 15-centimeter (5.9 in) Krupp cannon on pivot mounts in semi-circular sponsons on the main deck, three guns on each broadside. All of these guns were protected against the weather by gun shields. Defense against torpedo boats was provided by two quick-firing (QF) 3-pounder (47-millimeter (1.9 in)) Hotchkiss guns on the forward bridge, ten quadruple 1-inch (25 mm) Nordenfelt guns positioned the length of the superstructure and four 10-barrel, 11-millimeter (0.43 in) Nordenfelt organ guns mounted in the fighting tops of the military masts. In addition, there were four 356-millimeter (14 in) above-water tubes in the hull for Schwartzkopff torpedoes, two on each broadside.

Takachiho's armament frequently changed over her career and the first such was the replacement of her slow-firing 15-centimeter guns with Armstrong's QF 6-inch (152 mm) guns in 1896 after the First Sino-Japanese War. At the same time four of the 1-inch Nordenfelt guns were replaced by two 3-pounders and two QF 6-pounder (57-millimeter (2.2 in)) Nordenfelt guns. The fighting tops and the 10-barrel organ guns were removed in 1898 and the main guns were replaced by a pair of Armstrong 6-inch guns in 1902. At the same time the 6-pounders and the remaining Nordenfelt guns were exchanged for more 3-pounders, giving the ship a total of ten 3-pounders and a pair of lighter Yamauchi QF 2.5-pounder (47-millimeter) guns.

The protection of the Esmeralda had been much criticized by the British Admiralty and White raised the height of the two-inch (51 mm) steel protective deck to a foot (30.5 centimeters) above the waterline. The three-inch (76 mm) sloped portion of the deck extended to a depth of four feet (1.2 m) below the waterline. Amidships, the highly subdivided compartments formed by the sloped portion of the protective deck were filled with coal and the fore and aft areas were fitted with cofferdams to limit any flooding. The walls of the conning tower were three inches thick and the loading station was protected by two inches of steel armor.

== Construction and career ==
Named for a mountain in the volcanic Kirishima range between Kagoshima and Miyazaki Prefectures in Japan, which was a prominent location in Japanese mythology, Takachiho was ordered from Armstrong Mitchell on 22 March 1884 as Japan lacked the ability to build the Naniwas itself. The ship was laid down at the company's Low Walker shipyard in Newcastle upon Tyne on 10 April as yard number 476 and launched on 16 May 1885. She was completed on 26 March 1886 and departed for Japan on 10 May with a British crew and captain.

Takachiho arrived at Yokohama on 3 July 1886 and was assigned to the Standing Fleet on 7 August as a second-class warship. The sisters hosted Emperor Meiji and his wife, Empress Shōken, on 26 November as the ships conducted torpedo-firing exercises. In early 1887 they transported the Emperor and Empress from Yokohama to Kyoto and back again. Takachiho and Naniwa participated in the fleet maneuvers from 22 August to 5 September. Two months later they circumnavigated the Home Islands together with four other ships. In mid- and late 1888, the sisters cruised to Okinawa, Taiwan, Wonsan, Kingdom of Korea, and Zhifu, China. By the following year, Takachiho was assigned to the Sasebo Naval District and was serving as the flagship of the Standing Small Fleet. Together with her sister, she visited ports in the Russian Far East, Korea and China while also participating in fleet maneuvers in the last half of the year.

After taking part in the 1890 Great Maneuvers with the Imperial Japanese Army, the cruiser was reviewed by the Emperor. On 23 August Takachiho and Naniwa were reclassified as first-class warships. Takachiho sailed to China in mid-1891 for a diplomatic visit between the fleet commander, Rear Admiral Arichi Shinanojō, and Li Hongzhang, Viceroy of Zhili. After the training ship Tsukuba damaged her propeller and hull in a heavy storm in Futami Bay on 4 October, Arichi transferred his flag to Naniwa while Takachiho towed Tsukuba to Kure Naval Arsenal for repairs. The sisters cruised to Hong Kong in early 1892 before participating in the annual Great Maneuvers. Takachiho was reduced to reserve in July while she was in a refit that lasted until 21 April 1893. She resumed her role as the fleet flagship as Rear Admiral Itō Sukeyuki hoisted his flag aboard the cruiser before she traveled to China in July so that Itō could meet with Li. On 13 August, the ship became the flagship of the Standing Fleet and visited Vladivostok later that month. On 6 March 1894, Takachiho departed Japan to relieve her sister in Honolulu, Hawaii, that was protecting Japanese citizens and interests there during the time that the Provisional Government of Hawaii controlled the country. The cruiser arrived on 21 March and remained there until tensions began to rise between Japan and China over Korea. She arrived at Yokosuka on 10 July and was assigned to the Main Squadron on 22 July.

=== First Sino-Japanese War ===
Takachiho was transferred to the First Flying Squadron about 30 July where she joined her sister and the fast protected cruisers Akitsushima and Yoshino, under the command of Rear Admiral Tsuboi Kōzō. On 9 August, Vice Admiral Itō, now commanding the Combined Fleet, took his ships to Weihaiwei, China, in search of the Beiyang Fleet and conducted a desultory bombardment of the port's coastal defenses when he did not find the Chinese ships. No damage was inflicted on either side and the Combined Fleet returned to Kunsan, Korea. For the rest of the month, the Flying Squadron escorted troop convoys to Kunsan. Itō sent a pair of cruisers back to Weihahiwei on 14–15 September to find the Chinese ships, but they were unsuccessful. Their failure convinced Itō that the Beiyang Fleet was further north.

The Flying Squadron led the rest of the Combined Fleet northwest on 16 September to investigate the anchorage at Haiyang Island. Finding it empty the following morning, Itō ordered his ships to head northeast and search the area around the Yalu River estuary. At 11:23 lookouts aboard Yoshino spotted the Chinese ships some 21.5 nmi (39.8 km; 24.7 mi) away. Knowing that his ships were faster than the Chinese ones, Itō intended to cross the T of the Beiyang Fleet and then concentrate his fire on the weakly protected ships of the Chinese right wing.

Admiral Ding Ruchang's ships had been caught by surprise, but were able to weigh anchor and assume Ding's preferred line abreast formation while the Combined Fleet was still out of range. The Chinese ships opened fire at long range and were unable to hit any of the Japanese ships as they passed in front. The Flying Squadron's ships opened fire as the range closed to 3,000 yards (2,700 m) and soon set the unprotected cruisers Yangwei and Chaoyong on fire. The battle quickly devolved into a melee at close range, and the protected cruiser Zhiyuan and the armored cruiser Jingyuan were sunk as the Flying Squadron's ships concentrated on the Chinese cruisers. During the battle Takachiho was slightly damaged by five hits that killed one man and wounded two others. She fired 22 shells from her main guns, 89 from her secondary armament and several thousand from her smaller guns.

After the battle, the Combined Fleet escorted troop convoys through the Korea Bay to Chinese territory at the base of the Liaodong Peninsula and supported the IJA's advance down the length of the peninsula towards Port Arthur (modern Lüshunkou). This allowed the Beiyang Fleet to sail from Port Arthur to Weihei in early November without being detected. Itō sent Takachiho and Yoshino to see if the Chinese ships were still at Port Arthur on 8 November and only located them at Weihaiwei a week later. The Combined Fleet cruised off the Chinese port on 16–17 November, but Ding was under orders to refuse battle, and the Japanese ships departed to begin the blockade of Port Arthur in support of the IJA's impending successful assault on the port. Takachiho surveyed the area around the Hai River estuary on 7–11 December to evaluate its suitability for amphibious operations ultimately leading to an attack on the Chinese capital of Beijing. The specialists aboard the ship concluded that no such landings were possible during the winter season. Combined with pressure by the European nations not to attack Beijing, this forced the Japanese strategists to focus on the destruction of the Beiyang Fleet by assaulting its home port of Weihaiwei and Takachiho spent 23–26 December locating a suitable landing place on the Shandong Peninsula.

The Japanese landed troops in January 1895 and gradually encircled the city. Itō was unwilling to commit his lightly armored ships to attacks on the formidable fortifications defending the port as he had to be prepared to defeat the Chinese ships if they attempted to break through the blockade. Successful night attacks by his torpedo boats in early February sank or damaged the larger ships and the morale of the Chinese crews continued to decline. Ding failed to make his own nocturnal torpedo attacks against the blockaders, but the Chinese torpedo boats sortied on the morning of 7 February and unsuccessfully attempted to escape by steaming west along the coast towards Zhifu. All of them were either destroyed or captured, although the two fastest boats had to be pursued by Takachiho and Yoshino and were forced to beach themselves before reaching the port. It is unclear whether Ding ordered them to breakout or if they deserted before the Chinese surrender on 12 February.

The Japanese wanted to take the Pescadores Islands between the Chinese coast and Taiwan as a base from which to mount their invasion of Taiwan. Delayed by bad weather, the IJA landed on Wangan Island on 23 March as Takachiho and the Flying Squadron bombarded the fort defending the island. The Chinese forces defending the islands surrendered or abandoned their positions and all of the islands were under Japanese control three days later. Preparations to conquer Taiwan took several months to organize and the IJA only made its first landing on the island on 1 June. Two days later, Takachiho and Naniwa were among the ships bombarding the forts defending the port of Keelung as the IJA successfully attacked it. On 7 June the sisters briefly blockaded the port of Tamsui near the island's capital of Taipei.

Takachiho returned to Japan on 10 July and was reduced to reserve eight days later. She received a lengthy refit and modernization in 1896. The ship was reclassified as a second-class cruiser on 21 March 1898 and cruised off Taiwan and the southern Chinese coast in 1899. During the Boxer Rebellion, the cruiser was dispatched to support Japanese troops in Amoy on the Taiwan Strait on 14 July 1900 and returned to Sasebo on 18 October. Two years later, Takachiho was transferred to the Yokosuka Naval District on 1 April.

=== Russo-Japanese War ===
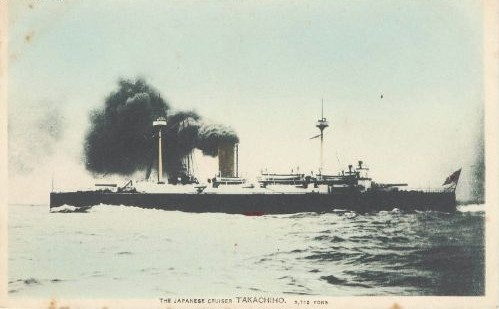
A 1905 postcard of Takachiho

On 28 December 1903, Takachiho and Naniwa were assigned to the Fourth Division of Vice Admiral Kamimura Hikonojō's Second Fleet and Takachiho had minelaying equipment installed by the Kure Naval Arsenal on 7–16 January 1904. Vice Admiral Tōgō Heihachirō, commander of the Combined Fleet, intended that the Fourth Division, under the command of Rear Admiral Uryū Sotokichi, reinforced by the armored cruiser Asama, would escort troop ships to Chemulpo (modern Incheon) and destroy any Russian forces there to clear the way for the IJA units to land. The cruiser Chiyoda was present at Chemulpo monitoring the situation there and would coordinate with Uryū.

Chiyoda rendezvoused with Uryū's ships on the morning of 8 February and reported that the Russian protected cruiser Varyag and the elderly gunboat Korietz were anchored in the neutral port of Chemulpo, together with British, French, Italian and American warships. It was against the laws of war to attack enemy ships in a neutral ports, so Uryū decided to send his transports to unload their troops in the port as the Russians would be unlikely to initiate hostilities in neutral territory amidst the Western ships. Just in case, he ordered Takachiho, Asama, and Chiyoda to escort the troop ships into harbor with the two first cruisers to later rejoin the rest of the Fourth Division blockading the port. The following morning Uryū announced that a state of war existed between the Russian and Japanese Empires and the Russian commander decided to attempt to break through the blockade even though he was heavily outnumbered. His ships sortied later that morning and Takachiho was among the ships that badly damaged Varyag and forced the Russian ships to return to Chemulpo where Varyag was scuttled and Korietz was blown up later that afternoon.

After the battle, the Fourth Division was tasked to protect the Korean coast between Chemulpo and Asan and to cover the movement of IJA reinforcements through the former port. On 10 March the division ineffectually bombarded what the Japanese believed to be a naval mine control station on an island near Port Arthur. The following month, raids by the Russian cruisers based in Vladivostok under the command of Rear Admiral Karl Jessen caused Tōgō to task Kamimura with the defense of the Sea of Japan and the Tsushima Strait, for which task he was reinforced with the Fourth Division. At the end of April Kamimura took his ships to lay minefields off Vladivostok and Takachiho laid 24 mines on 29 April, after which her minelaying equipment was removed. She was under repair at Tsushima when the Russian cruiser squadron sank three transports on 15 June. During another raid by the Russians at the end of the month, Kamimura's ships spotted the enemy ships, but lost contact with them after nightfall.

==== Battle off Ulsan ====
The Russian Pacific Squadron was supposed to break through the Japanese blockade of Port Arthur and rendezvous with the Vladivostok cruiser squadron near the Strait of Tsushima on 10 August, but Admiral Wilgelm Vitgeft, commander of the Pacific Squadron, failed to coordinate with Jessen and the latter's ships were unprepared to immediately sortie when Jessen was surprised to receive a telegram from Port Arthur stating that Vitgeft's ships were at sea on the afternoon of 11 August. Jessen's ships were only able to depart late the following morning and were out of radio range before they could be told that the Pacific Squadron had been defeated and returned to port. Kamimura had kept the four armored cruisers of the 2nd Division together under his direct command and was patrolling the southern Part of the Sea of Japan when each side spotted the other around 05:00. Kamimura was between Jessen's ships and Vladivostok and he radioed nearby ships that he had the enemy in sight. Uryū's ships were deployed further south with Naniwa and Takachiho the closest. The latter logged Kamimura's message at 05:15, but continued steam west-southwest for another half-hour before she turned northward and increased speed to 14 knots (26 km/h; 16 mph).

Naniwa arrived around 06:00 and Takachiho an hour after that, but Uryū kept his lightly armored ships away from the more heavily armored Russian cruisers until Jessen had abandoned the badly damaged armored cruiser Rurik around 08:30. The sisters opened fire at 08:42 at a range of 7,100 yards (6,500 m) and continued until 10:05 when Uryū ordered them to cease fire after they had expended over 650 six-inch shells between them. The senior surviving Russian officer ordered Rurik scuttled shortly afterwards and the Japanese ships began rescuing survivors. Each of the sisters had been hit once during the battle and the Russian shell had injured 13 crewmen.

==== Battle of Tsushima ====
On 8 April 1905, Takachiho was assigned to the Vladivostok blockading force, but was relieved of that assignment less than a week later. By 21 May she had rejoined Uryū's Fourth Division. Tōgō tasked the division with attacking the Russian cruisers and other smaller ships trailing the battleships once the battle began. Accordingly, Uryū opened fire on the protected cruisers Oleg and Aurora and the elderly armored cruisers Vladimir Monomakh and Dmitrii Donskoi around 14:45 on 27 May at ranges between 6,600–7,100 yards (6,000–6,500 m) in poor visibility. About 15:35 Takachiho was struck by a large shell underwater that failed to penetrate the hull, but the shock of the impact disabled her steering gear which forced her to heave to in order to make repairs. The isolated cruiser had just finished her repairs at 17:11 when she was engaged by three Russian battleships at 17:20 when they had closed the range to 9,400 yards (8,600 m). They only briefly fired at Takachiho before Kamimura's armored cruisers interposed themselves between the Russians and all of the Japanese protected cruisers. Around 18:00, the cruiser rejoined the Fourth Division and briefly engaged the disabled battleship Knyaz Suvorov and the repair ship Kamchatka a half-hour later. Several days after the battle, Takachiho and Naniwa, together with the armored cruiser Tokiwa, were detached to monitor the internment of some Russian colliers that had entered port before the battle.

== Subsequent career ==
Takachiho was assigned to the South China Fleet in 1906 and cruised the waters of the South China Sea. The ship visited Shanghai and Fuzhou, China, the following year and was relieved of her assignment on 13 June. In October 1908 the sisters participated in that year's grand maneuvers under the command of the First Fleet. Takachiho became a submarine depot ship in April 1909 and was then refitted. She was converted into a minelayer by the Yokosuka Naval Arsenal in early 1911 with all of her six-inch guns exchanged for eight or twelve 3-inch (76 mm) guns except for the bow gun, the installation of mine rails on the upper deck and storage for over 200 mines on the middle and lower decks. The ship then became a training ship for the IJN's submarine school. Takachiho was redesignated as a second-class coastal defence ship on 28 August 1912, but likely continued as a training ship.

After the Japanese declaration of World War I on the German Empire on 8 August 1914, Takachiho was ordered to load 120 mines and assigned to the Second Fleet. On 23 August the fleet sortied to begin the siege of German-owned Qingdao and the minelayer escorted the troopships there. The ship was struck by two torpedoes fired from the German torpedo boat S90 on the night of 17/18 October with 120 mines aboard. The detonation of the torpedo warheads triggered a sympathetic explosion of Takachiho's mines and sank her with the loss of 264 crewmen. There were only three survivors of the disaster. She was struck from the navy list on 29 October 1914.
