= Vsevolod Rudnev =

Vsevolod Fyodorovich Rudnev
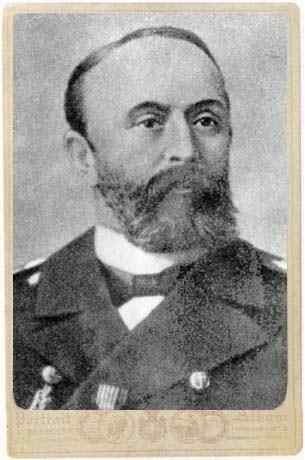
- Vsevolod Fyodorovich Rudnev
- Born: August 31, 1855; Dünamünde, Governorate of Livonia, Russian Empire
- Died: July 20, 1913 (aged 57) Tula Oblast, Russia
- Allegiance: Russian Empire
- Branch: Imperial Russian Navy
- Service years: 1873–1913
- Rank: Counter admiral
- Conflicts: Russo-Japanese War

Vsevolod Fyodorovich Rudnev (Russian: Все́волод Фёдорович Ру́днев; 31 August 1855 – 20 July 1913) was a career naval officer in the Imperial Russian Navy, noted for his heroic role in the Battle of Chemulpo Bay during the Russo-Japanese War of 1904–1905.

== Biography ==
Rudnev was born in Dünamünde, Governorate of Livonia of the Russian Empire (now part of Riga, Latvia), where his father was a naval officer and a hero of the Russo-Turkish War. His ancestors were local nobility from Tula, Russia, one of whom was also a naval officer who had been decorated by Tsar Peter the Great for valor at the Battle of Azov. After the death of his father, the family relocated to Lyuban, near St Petersburg.

Rudnev entered the Sea Cadets on September 15, 1872, on a government scholarship granted in recognition of his father's heroism. He entered active duty as a midshipman on May 1, 1873, and participated in training voyages on the Baltic Sea in 1875. After graduating with honors in 1876, he was appointed to a training frigate Petropavlovsk, reaching the rank of warrant officer. Assigned to the cruiser Afrika on April 16, 1880, he circumnavigated the globe, returning to Russia in 1883. One of his shipmates on this voyage was future Admiral Vasili Fersen.

Rudnev was assigned to patrol vessels on the Baltic from 1885 to 1887, and was assigned to sail Russia's first steam military transport, "Peter the Great", from its shipyards in France to Kronstadt in 1888.

He also married the same year to Maria Nikolaevna Schwan, whose father, a naval captain was a hero of the Crimean War.

In August 1889, Rudnev was assigned to the cruiser Admiral Kornilov, participated in the maneuvers of the Russian Pacific Fleet. He returned to Krondstat in December 1890 and was given command of a destroyer. He was subsequently made executive officer of the battleship Gangut.

In 1893, Rudnev was promoted to junior captain and became executive officer on the battleship Imperator Nikolai I, the flagship of Admiral Stepan Makarov's Mediterranean Squadron. He again circumnavigated the globe in 1895, this time on the Imperator Nikolai I.

On his return to Kronstadt, Rudnev became commander of the coast defense ship Admiral Greig, and then was appointed commander of the destroyer Vyborg. In December 1897, Rudnev became commander of the gunboat Gremyaschi, on which he made his first independent voyage round the world, departing March 1, 1898 and returning safely to Russia on May 15, 1899. A circumnavigation of the globe in such a small vessel was unusual for the time.

In 1900, Rudnev became a senior assistant to the commander of the port in Port Arthur, the main base of the Russian Pacific Fleet. During this time, he oversaw extensive upgrade works to dredge the inner roads, rebuild and extend the dry-dock, electrification and strengthen coastal defense. In December 1901, he was promoted to captain of the first rank.

In December 1902, Rudnev was appointed commander of the Varyag. On the eve of the Russo-Japanese War, he was ordered to the neutral Korean port of Chemulpo (modern Incheon) to protect Russian interests. On the morning of February 9, 1904, he received an ultimatum from Imperial Japanese Navy Admiral Uryū Sotokichi demanding that he leave the protection of the port by noon, or be attacked (which would have been a violation of Korean neutrality and international law). Rudnev decided to break out of the port, knowing that he was very much outnumbered and outgunned by the Japanese fleet that was waiting offshore for the opportunity to attack. The Japanese fleet blocked the path to the open sea, and a brisk gun battle ensured, with Varyag damaging the Japanese cruisers Asama, Chiyoda and Takachiho, but taking severe damage in return. Rudnev was injured by a shrapnel wound to the head, and Varyag was on fire with half her guns out of commission. Rather than surrender to the Japanese, Rudnev scuttled the cruiser and escaped with his surviving crew to the protection of neutral ships in the harbor, from which they were eventually repatriated to Russia via neutral ports. Although the Battle of Chemulpo Bay was a decisive defeat for Russia, Rudnev was awarded the Order of St. George (4th class) for heroism and promoted to adjutant. He was also assigned command of a new battleship, then under construction.

In April 1904, Rudnev was given command of the new battleship Andrei Pervozvannii, whose construction had only recently begun, and of the Fourteenth Fleet Equipage in St. Petersburg. In autumn 1905, however, his good fortune began to wane with his failure to prevent his crew from holding a meeting to protest the tsar's October Manifesto. After the Russian Revolution of 1905, Rudnev refused to take disciplinary measures against the revolutionary-minded men of his crew who had protested the manifesto. He was urged to submit his resignation in November 1905 and was placed on the inactive list, although he was promoted simultaneously to rear admiral. Rudnev published several articles in the years until his death eight years later.

After the war, in 1907, Japanese Emperor Meiji awarded Rudnev the Order of the Rising Sun, (2nd class), the first Russian to be so honored, and an unprecedented recognition of an enemy commander. Rudnev accepted the order, but never wore it in public.

Rudnev retired to his family's ancestral estate in Myshenki village (now Zaoksky District, Tula Oblast), where he died in 1913. During the Russian Civil War, his wife and three sons relocated to Sevastopol, and eventually fled to exile in Yugoslavia, and later to France. His older son Nikolay returned with his family to the Soviet Union in 1958 where he lived until his death in 1963. His middle son Georgiy emigrated to Venezuela. The younger son stayed in France. The Soviet government erected a monument to his memory in Tula in 1956.

== In philately ==
Rudnev was a noted philatelist, starting as a youth. He used every opportunity on his numerous circumnavigations of the globe to add to his collection. He assembled a large collection, containing many rarities, including the famed "Blue Mauritius". The eventual fate of his collection is unknown.

In the Soviet Union and in post-Soviet Russia, a number of commemorative postage stamps were issued honoring Rudnev and/or the crew of the Varyag, including:

- 25 March 1958, a USSR postage stamp (TSFA (ITC "Mark"), # 2135), with a drawing of Rudnev by Ivan Dubasov.
- 22 November 1972, a USSR series of stamps dedicated to the history of the Russian Navy. A stamp with face value of 3 kopecks by artist Vasily Zavyalov depicts the cruiser Varyag (TSFA (ITC "Mark") # 4182) .
- 7 February 2002, a Russian Federation stamped envelope from the series "Russian Navy" depicting the cruiser Varyag.
