= HMS Talbot (1895) =

Eclipse-class cruiser

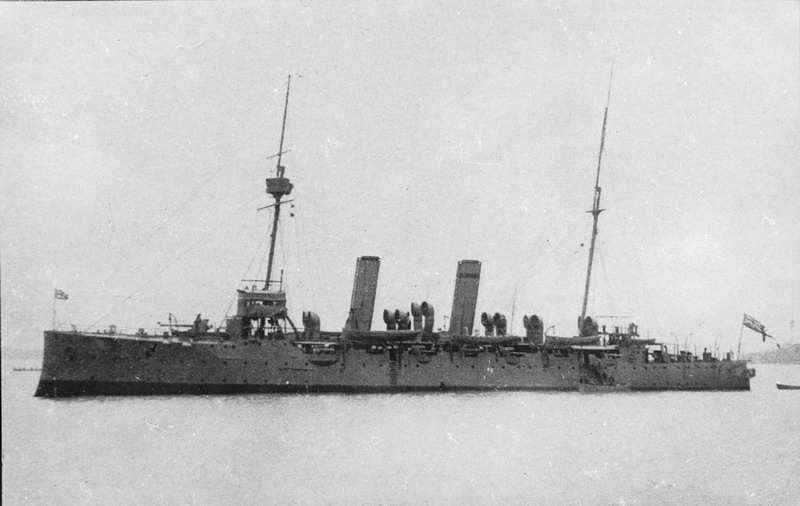
- Talbot at anchor, c. 1904

History

United Kingdom
- Name: HMS Talbot
- Builder: Devonport Dockyard
- Laid down: 5 March 1894
- Launched: 25 April 1895
- Completed: 15 September 1896
- Out of service: 1919
- Fate: Sold for scrap, 6 December 1921

General characteristics
- Class & type: Eclipse-class protected cruiser
- Displacement: 5,600 long tons (5,690 t)
- Length: 350 ft (106.7 m)
- Beam: 53 ft 6 in (16.3 m)
- Draught: 20 ft 6 in (6.25 m)
- Installed power: 9,600 ihp (7,200 kW); 8 cylindrical boilers
- Propulsion: 2 shafts, 2 Inverted triple-expansion steam engines
- Speed: 18.5 knots (34.3 km/h; 21.3 mph)
- Complement: 450
- Armament: As built: 5 × QF 6-inch (152 mm) guns; 6 × QF 4.7-inch (120 mm) guns; 6 × 3-pounder QF guns; 3 × 18-inch torpedo tubes; After 1905: 11 × six-inch QF guns; 9 × 12-pounder QF guns; 7 × 3-pounder QF guns; 3 × 18-inch torpedo tubes
- Armour: Gun shields: 3 in (76 mm); Engine hatch: 6 in (152 mm); Decks: 1.5–3 in (38–76 mm); Conning tower: 6 in (152 mm)

HMS Talbot was an Eclipse-class protected cruiser built for the Royal Navy in the mid-1890s.

== Early career ==
HMS Talbot was laid down 5 March 1894 and launched 25 April 1895. She commissioned on 15 September 1896 for service on the North America and West Indies Station, but was back in the United Kingdom a couple of years later.

In 1899 she brought back, from the United States, the body of Lord Herschell to London.

In April 1901 she was commissioned at Devonport by Captain Frederick George Stopford, with a crew of 437, to serve at the China Station. She arrived at Hong Kong on 10 December 1901. In June 1902 she visited Kobe in Japan. Captain Lewis Bayly was appointed in command on 11 July 1902, and in February the following year she spent a week in Manila, accompanying the flag-ship HMS Glory together with the despatch vessel Alacrity.

She was present at Chemulpo Bay in 1904, during the historical naval battle between two Russian ships, the cruiser Varyag and the gunboat Korietz against a fleet of the Imperial Japanese Navy. Future Arctic explorers and members of Robert Falcon Scott's ill-fated Terra Nova Expedition Patrick Keohane and Edward Evans served aboard her.

== First World War ==
Talbot shelling Turkish positions at Suvla Bay

During the First World War she was assigned to Cruiser Force G and the 12 Cruiser Squadron operating in the English Channel. In September 1914 she captured a German merchant ship. On 27 March 1915 she arrived at the island of Tenedos for the Dardanelles and participated in the Battle of Gallipoli. Talbot was initially attached to the First Battle Squadron of the fleet and supported the landings at the tip of the Peninsula. On 26 April she supported the battleship HMS Goliath during attempts to support the landing on "Y Beach". In June she was the Senior Naval Officers' ship at Gaba Tepe, and during the Suvla landings she was the flagship of the 3rd Squadron. She remained at Gallipoli throughout the campaign, and covered the evacuation of Anzac beach in December 1915 and of Helles in January 1916.

In May 1916 Talbot was operating off the East African coast as part of the Cape Command. In January 1917 she was at Kiswere (Tanzania), when the second period of German commerce raids began and in 1918 she was off the Cape of Good Hope.

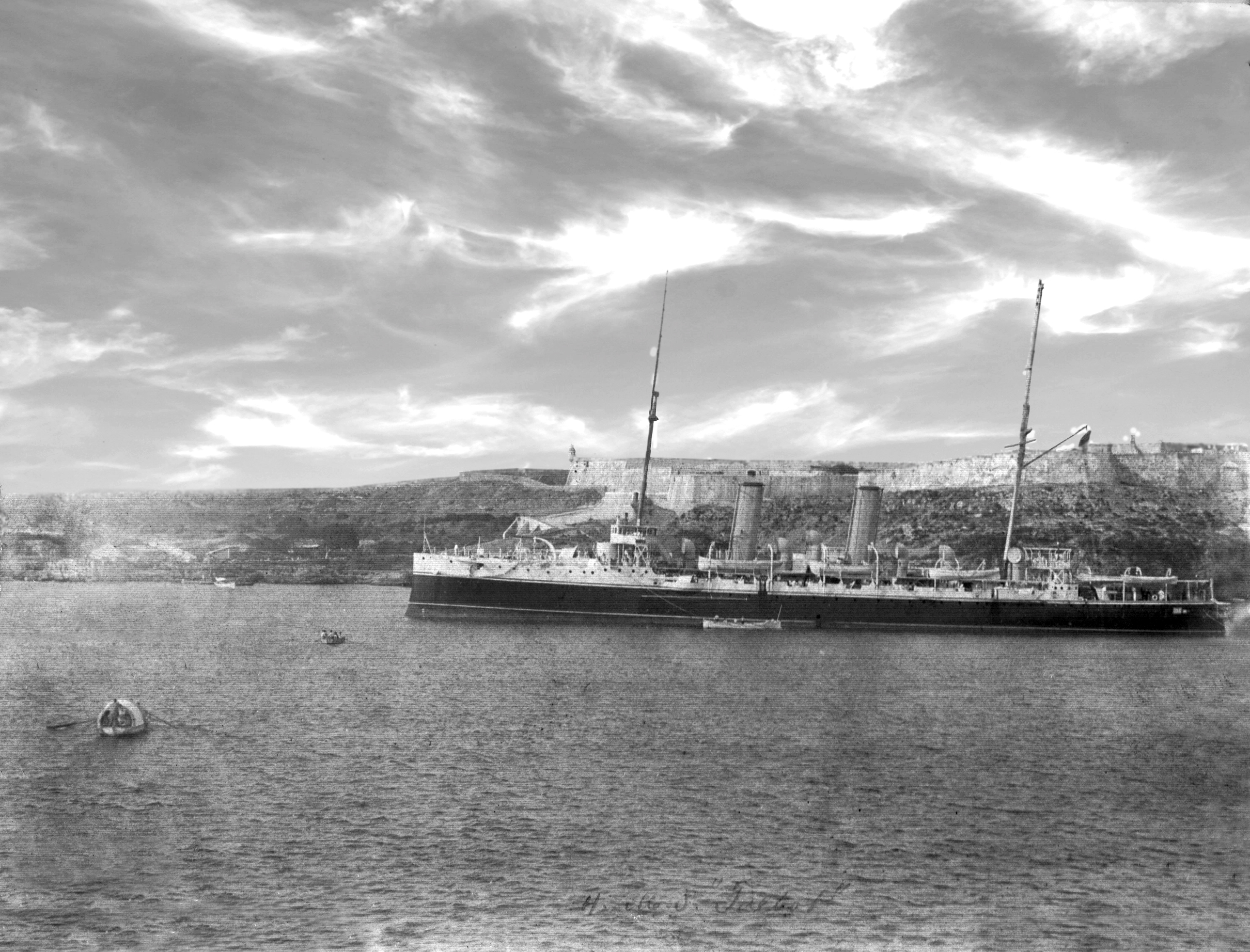
HMS Talbot, unknown port, date unknown.

== Fate ==
She was laid up at Haulbowline, Cork Harbour from 1919-1921. She was sold for scrap on 6 December 1921.
