= Russian gunboat Korietz =

Imperial Navy gunboat (1888–1904)

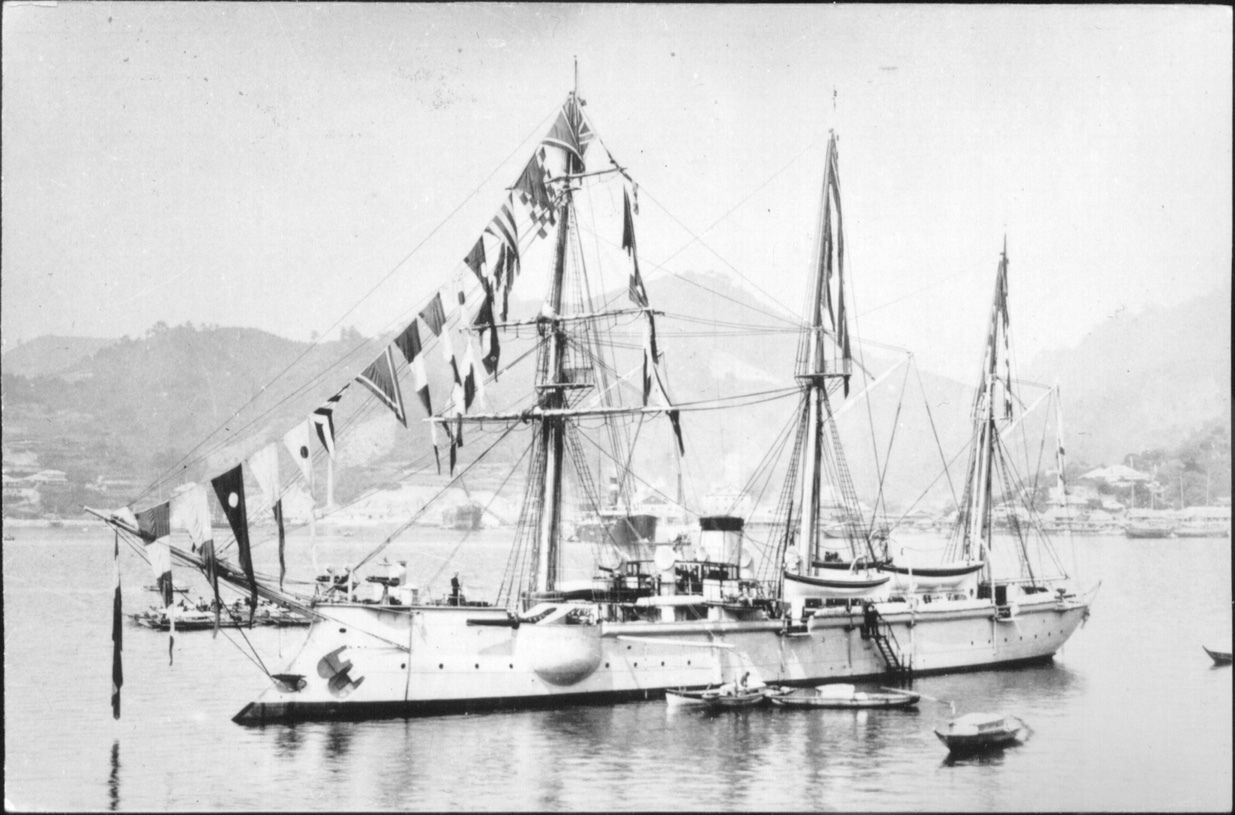
- Russian gunboat Korietz

History

Russian Empire
- Name: Korietz
- Builder: Bergsund Mekaniska, Stockholm, Sweden
- Laid down: December 1885
- Launched: August 7, 1886
- Commissioned: 1888
- Decommissioned: 1904
- Fate: Blown up after the Battle of Chemulpo Bay

General characteristics
- Type: Gunboat
- Displacement: 1,334 long tons (1,355 t)
- Length: 66.3 m (218 ft)
- Beam: 10.7 m (35 ft)
- Draught: 3.5 m (11 ft)
- Propulsion: Sails, horizontal one shaft double expansion steam engine
- Speed: 13.5 knots (25.0 km/h; 15.5 mph)
- Range: 2,850 nmi (5,280 km) at 8 kn (15 km/h)
- Complement: 12 officers and 162 sailors
- Armament: 2 х 8 in 35 caliber Pattern 1885 guns, 1 х 6 in 35 caliber Pattern 1877; 4 х 9 pdrs; 4 × 37 mm (1.5 in); 1 × 64 mm (2.5 in); 1х 381 mm (15.0 in) torpedo tube

Korietz (Russian: Кореец, Koreyets; literally meaning "Korean man") was a gunboat in the Russian Imperial Navy. She was the lead vessel in a class of eight ships in her class (including the Mandzhur served also on the Pacific, Donets, Zaporozhets, Kubanets, Terets, Uralets and Chernomorets on the Black Sea.) The etymology of the names of this class of ships was: Korietz is a Russian word for "Korean man", Mandzhur - "Manchuria man", Donets - "Don Cossack" (literally "Cossack from Don"), Kubanets - "Kuban Cossack" ("Kuban man"), Terets - "Terek Cossack" ("Terek man"), Uralets - "Ural Cossack" ("Ural man"), Chernomorets - "Black Sea Cossack" ("Black Sea man") and Zaporozhets - "Zaporozhian Cossack".

== Operational history ==
Korietz was laid down in Stockholm, Sweden at the Bergsund Mekaniska shipyards in December 1885, launched on August 7, 1886, and commissioned in 1888.

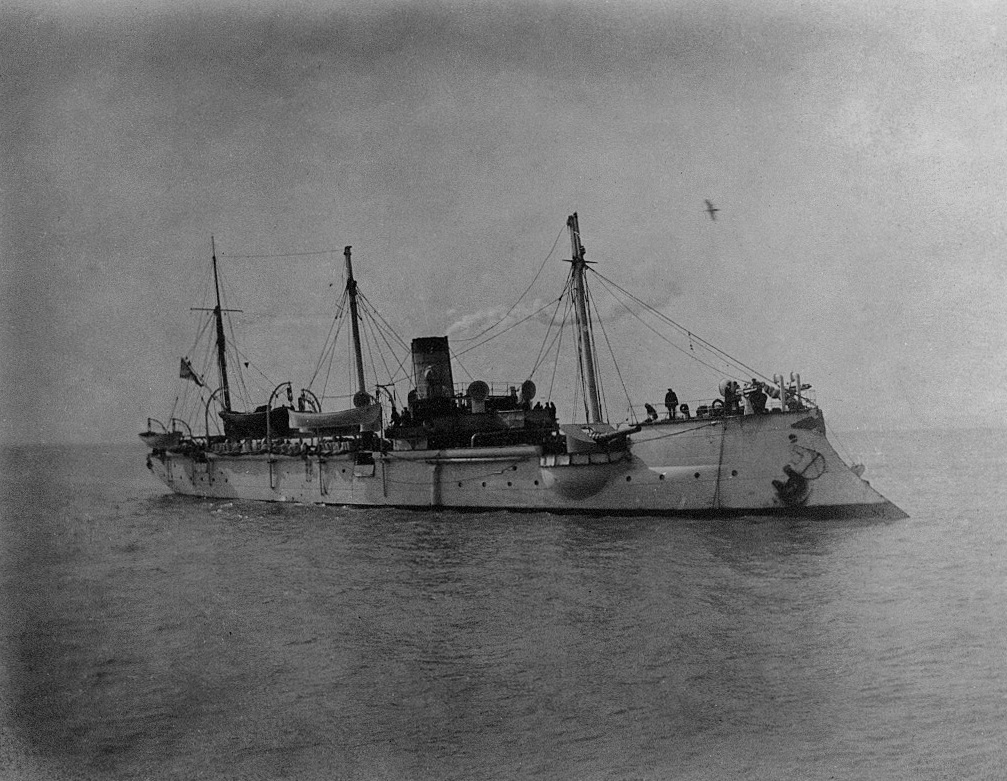
Korietz in Chemulpo Bay, February 1904.

Assigned to service with the Russian Pacific Fleet in 1895, she was a frequent visitor to ports in Korea, Japan and northern China. During the Boxer Rebellion, she participated in the Eight-Nation Alliance attack on Taku Forts in June 1900. During this battle, she was hit six times by shells fired by the Chinese defenders, and suffered nine crewmen killed and 20 wounded.

Together with the cruiser Varyag, Korietz was dispatched from Port Arthur to the main Korean port of Chemulpo (modern-day Incheon) in early 1904 to protect Russian interests, as diplomatic tensions continued to increase between Russia and the Empire of Japan. After the Russian transport Sungari arrived at Chemulpo on 7 February 1904, reporting the sighting of a large Japanese force approaching, Korietz (under the command of G. P. Belyaev) was ordered to return to Port Arthur to report and request instructions. In the early morning of 8 February 1904, Korietz spotted Chiyoda outside the Chemulpo roadstead, and mistaking it for a fellow Russian ship, loaded its guns for a salute. On closing in, the crew of the Korietz realized their mistake and in the ensuing confusion the guns were discharged. Chiyoda responded by launching a torpedo. Both sides missed, but this was the first actual exchange of fire in the Russo-Japanese War, and it is highly unclear which side actually opened fire first. Korietz retreated back to Chemulpo harbor.

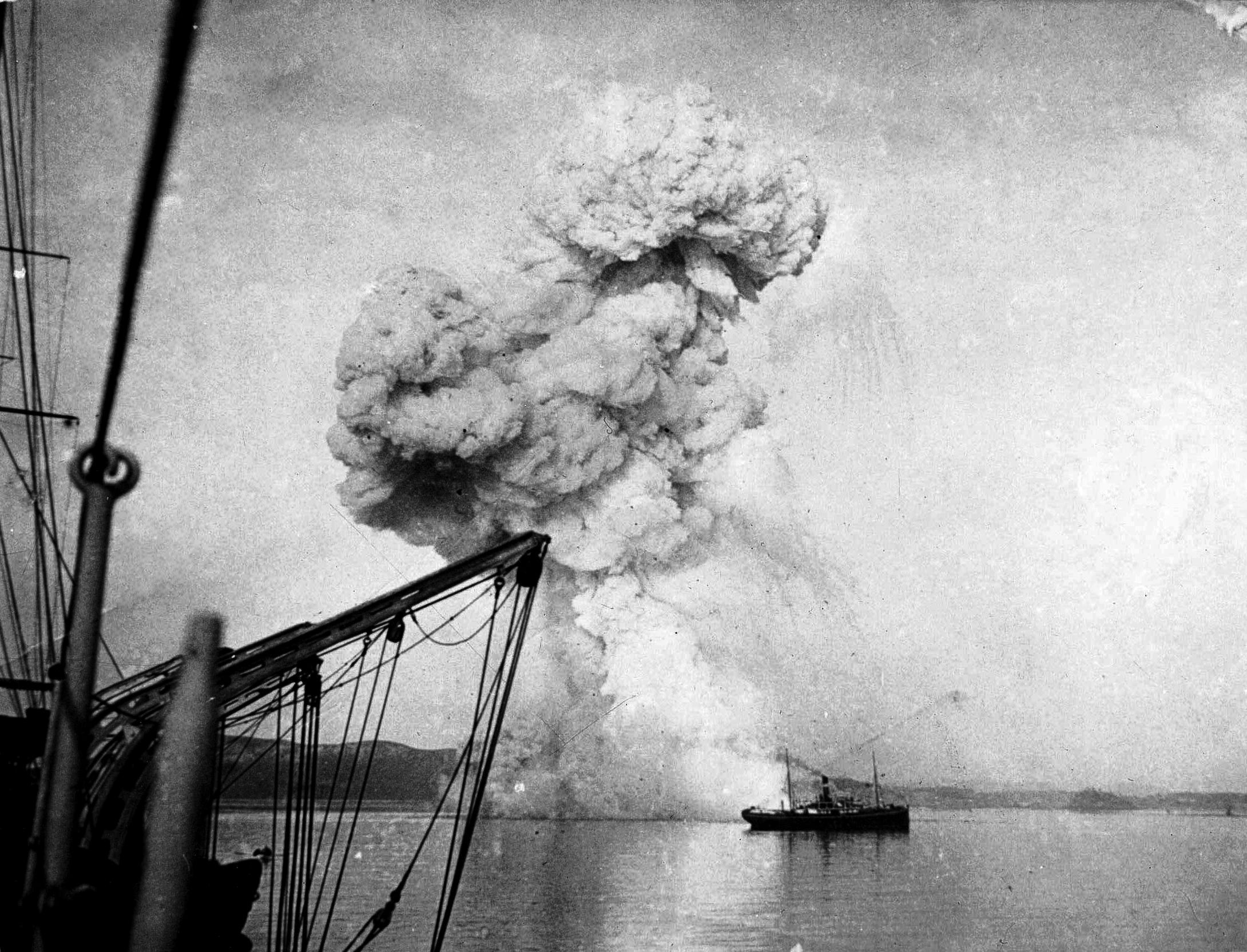
Korietz exploding at Chemulpo

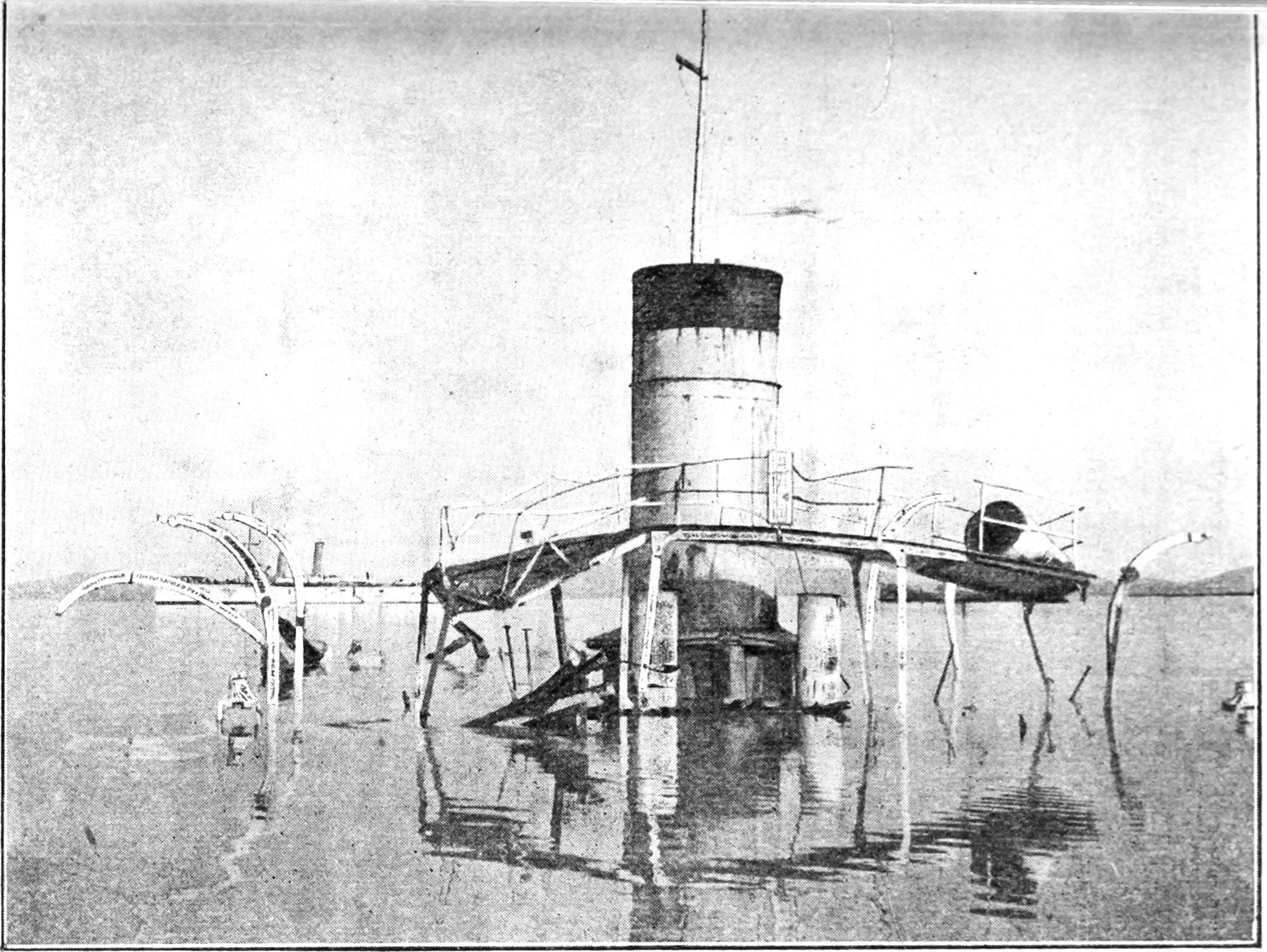
Wreck of Korietz after being scuttled, January 1905

In the subsequent Battle of Chemulpo Bay, Captain Vsevolod Rudnev of the Varyag refused an ultimatum by Imperial Japanese Navy admiral Uryū Sotokichi to surrender, and on February 9, 1904 attempted to break through the Japanese squadron from Chemulpo to the open sea. Vastly outnumbered and outgunned, Korietz fired 52 rounds at the Japanese ships, but was at a distance that most of its shots did not even reach the Japanese fleet. Varyag took heavy damage; Korietz suffered from only light damage from shrapnel with no casualties. Unable to break past the Japanese squadron by mid-afternoon, Korietz and Varyag returned to Chemulpo harbor, where both took refuge near the neutral warships. At 1600 the same day, Korietz was scuttled by its crew by blowing up two ammunition magazines. The crew was taken aboard a French cruiser Pascal, taken to Saigon, French Indochina, and returned to Russia. In St. Petersburg all the officers were awarded the Order of St. George (4th class), the highest military decoration of the Russian Empire.

After the end of the Russo-Japanese War, the wreckage of Korietz was raised by Japanese engineers, and scrapped.

== Second gunboat ==
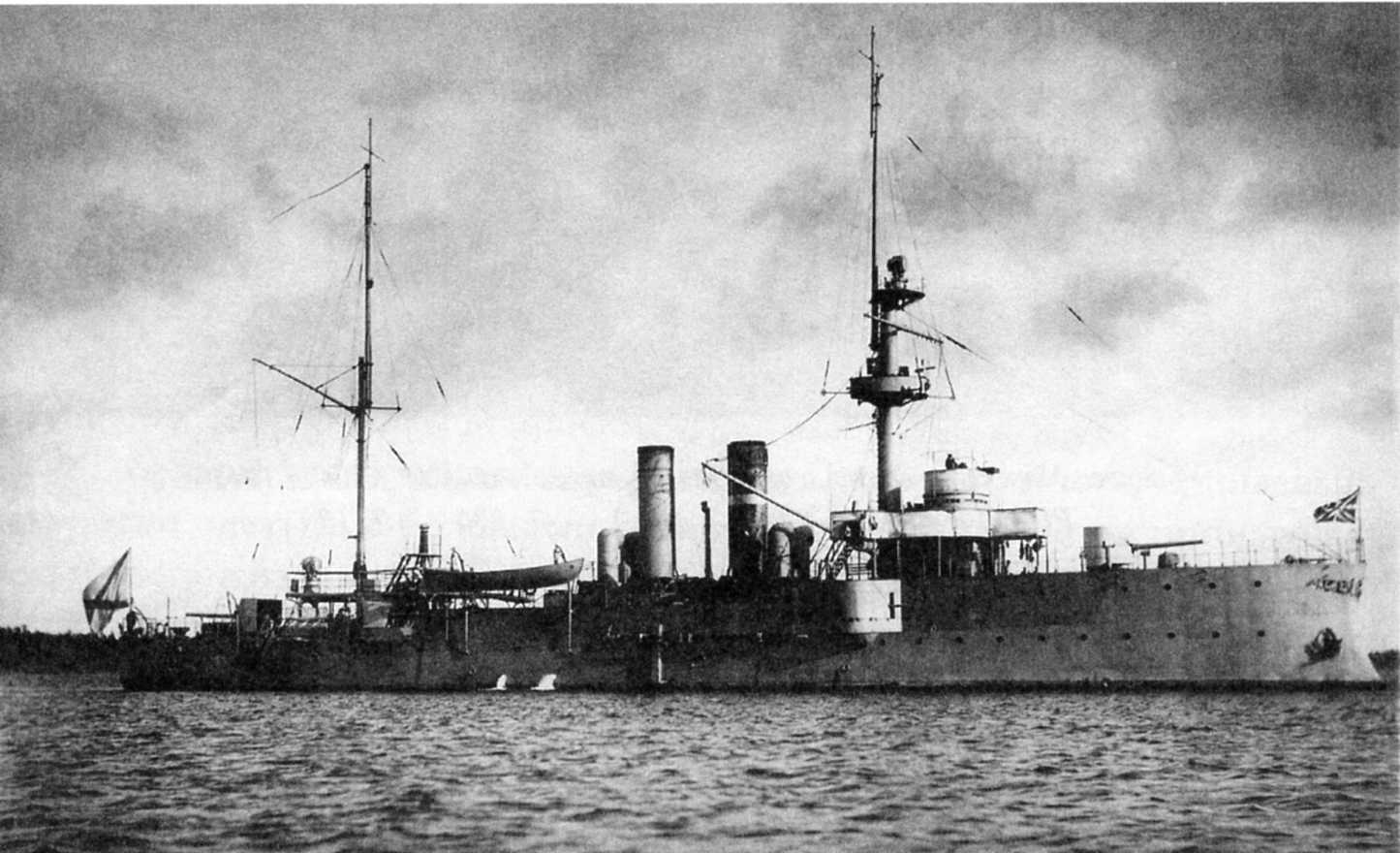
The second Korietz

There was a second gunboat named Korietz, laid down in 1906 at the Putilov Plant in Saint Petersburg, Russia. She was of the Gilyak class. At the end of the First World War she participated in the Battle of Moon Sound, but was blown up by her crew on August 8, 1915 to avoid surrendering to German forces.

== Other ==
The Grisha III class corvette Koreyets (Russian Кореец) of the modern Russian Navy was named after the Russo-Japanese War gunboat Korietz at the request of the Association of Koreans in Russia.
