= Battle of Chemulpo Bay =

Naval battle in the Russo-Japanese War

- Part of the Russo-Japanese War
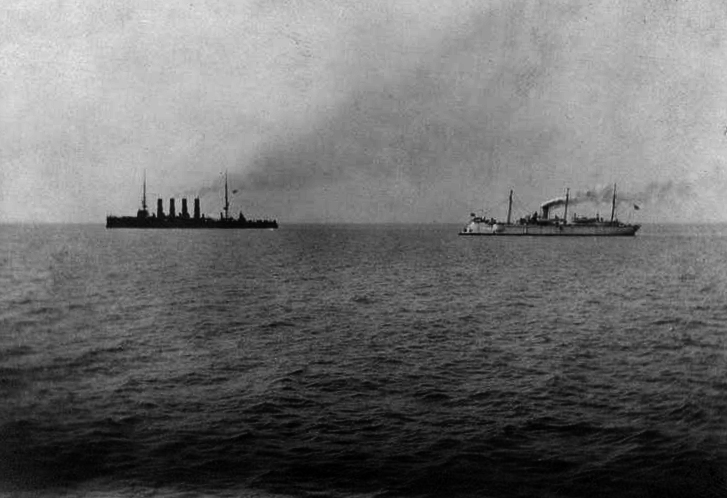
- Varyag and Korietz go into battle.
Date	9 February 1904
Location	off Chemulpo Bay, Korea; 37°20.8′N 126°31.37′E
Result	Japanese victory

Belligerents
Empire of Japan	Russian Empire

Commanders and leaders
(Empire of Japan) Uryū Sotokichi	(Russian Empire) Vsevolod Rudnev

Strength
1 Armoured cruiser, 5 protected cruisers, 1 aviso, 8 torpedo boats	Protected cruiser Varyag, Gunboat Korietz

Casualties and losses
No casualties reported by Japanese, 1 torpedo boat and about 30 men by Russian sources	33 killed, 97 wounded; both ships scuttled after the battle

The Battle of Chemulpo Bay was a naval battle in the Russo-Japanese War (1904–1905), which took place on 9 February 1904, off the coast of present-day Incheon (then called Chemulpo), Korea.

== Background ==
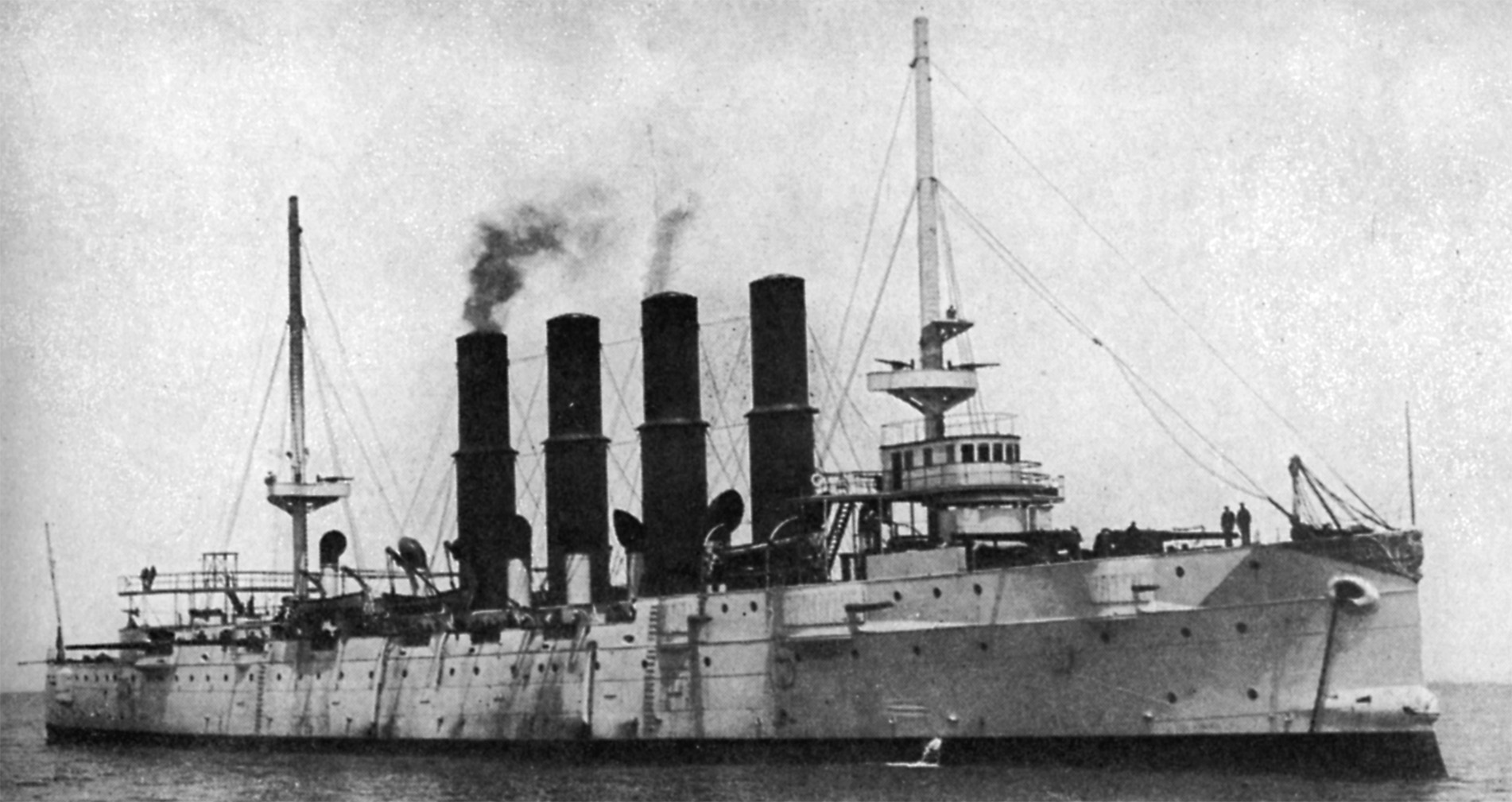
The Russian cruiser Varyag.

The opening stage of the Russo-Japanese War began with a pre-emptive strike by the Imperial Japanese Navy against the Russian Pacific Fleet spread among Port Arthur, Vladivostok, and Chemulpo Bay (now part of Incheon, Korea). Command of the Chemulpo operation was given to Rear Admiral Uryū Sotokichi, with six cruisers, three to eight torpedo boats (depending on sources), the aviso (dispatch boat) Chihaya, three transports and 2,500 ground troops. Chemulpo had strategic significance, as it was the main port for the Korean capital of Seoul, and was also the main invasion route used previously by Japanese forces in the First Sino-Japanese War of 1894. However, Chemulpo, with its wide tidal bore, extensive mudflats, and narrow, winding channels, posed a number of tactical challenges for both attackers and defenders.

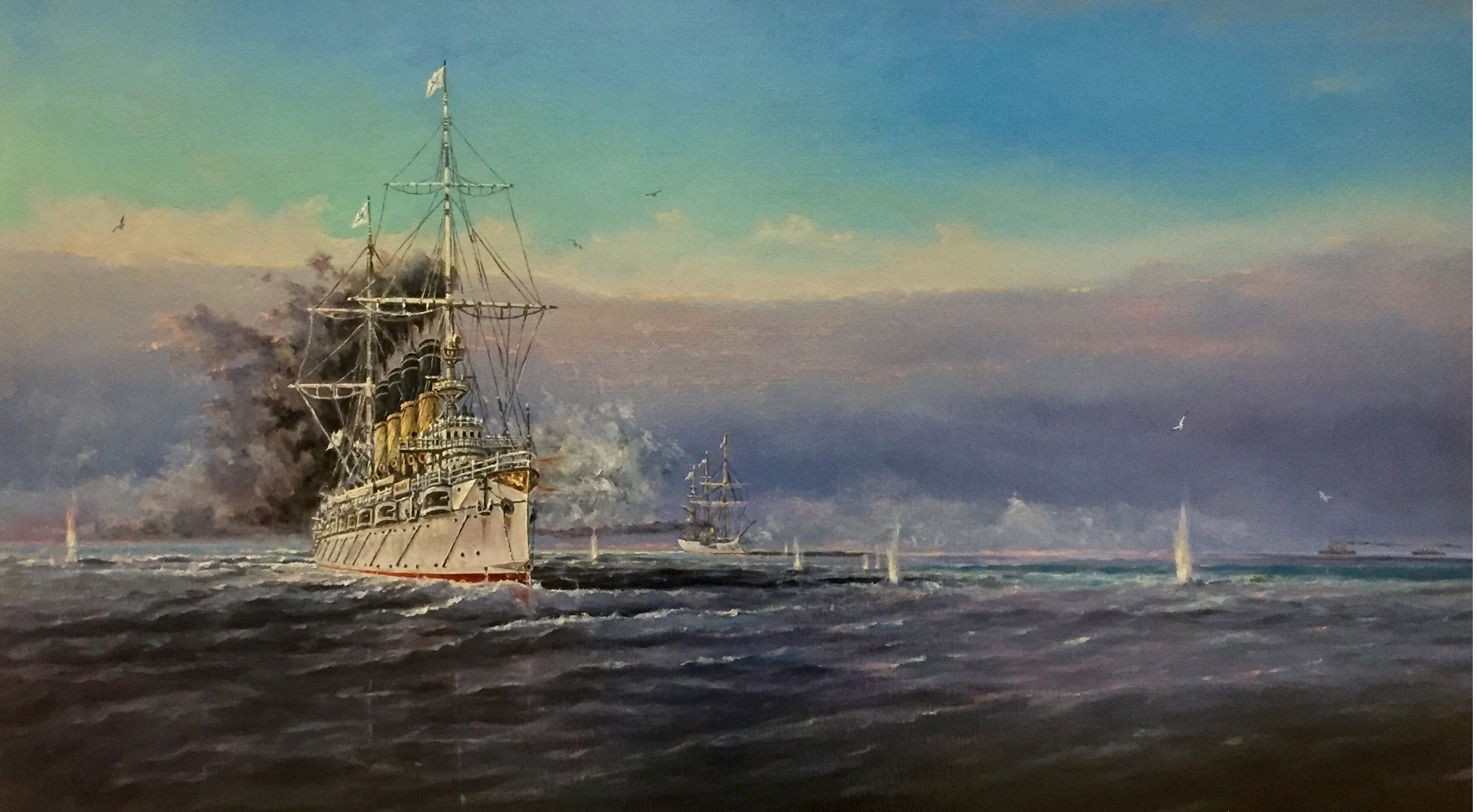
Vladimir Kosov. Fight at Chemulpo. The last parade of the cruiser Varyag.

The Japanese protected cruiser Chiyoda had been based at Chemulpo for the past 10 months, and had been keeping watch on the Russian protected cruiser Varyag and the aging gunboat Korietz, also based at Chemulpo to look after Russian interests.

After the Russian transport Sungari arrived at Chemulpo on 7 February 1904, reporting the sighting of a large Japanese force approaching, the gunboat Korietz was ordered to Port Arthur to report and request instructions. In the early morning of 8 February, Korietz spotted Chiyoda outside the Chemulpo roadstead, and mistaking it for a fellow Russian ship, loaded its guns for a salute. On closing in, the crew of Korietz realized their mistake and in the ensuing confusion the guns were discharged. Chiyoda responded by launching a torpedo. Both sides missed, but this was the first actual exchange of fire in the Russo-Japanese War, and it is highly unclear which side actually opened fire first. Korietz retreated back to Chemulpo harbor.

Later in the morning of 8 February 1904, Chiyoda rendezvoused with Uryū's squadron outside the entrance to Chemulpo, and reported that several warships from neutral countries were present in the anchorage, including: HMS Talbot (Great Britain), Pascal (France), and Elba (Italy). An American warship—the gunboat USS Vicksburg—was also present, but she was further up the harbor. Uryū reasoned that if the Russians remained anchored in the midst of the neutral ships, they could not attack his transports, whereas if the Russians came out to do battle, he had ample force to deal with them. On the other hand, it was against international law to attack the Russians while they were anchored in a neutral port. Uryū sent a message requesting that the captains of HMS Talbot, Pascal and Elba shift their anchorage, promising that no attack would be delivered before 16:00.

== Battle ==
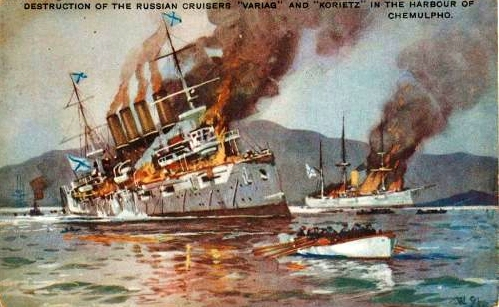
Postcard displaying the Battle of Chemulpo Bay

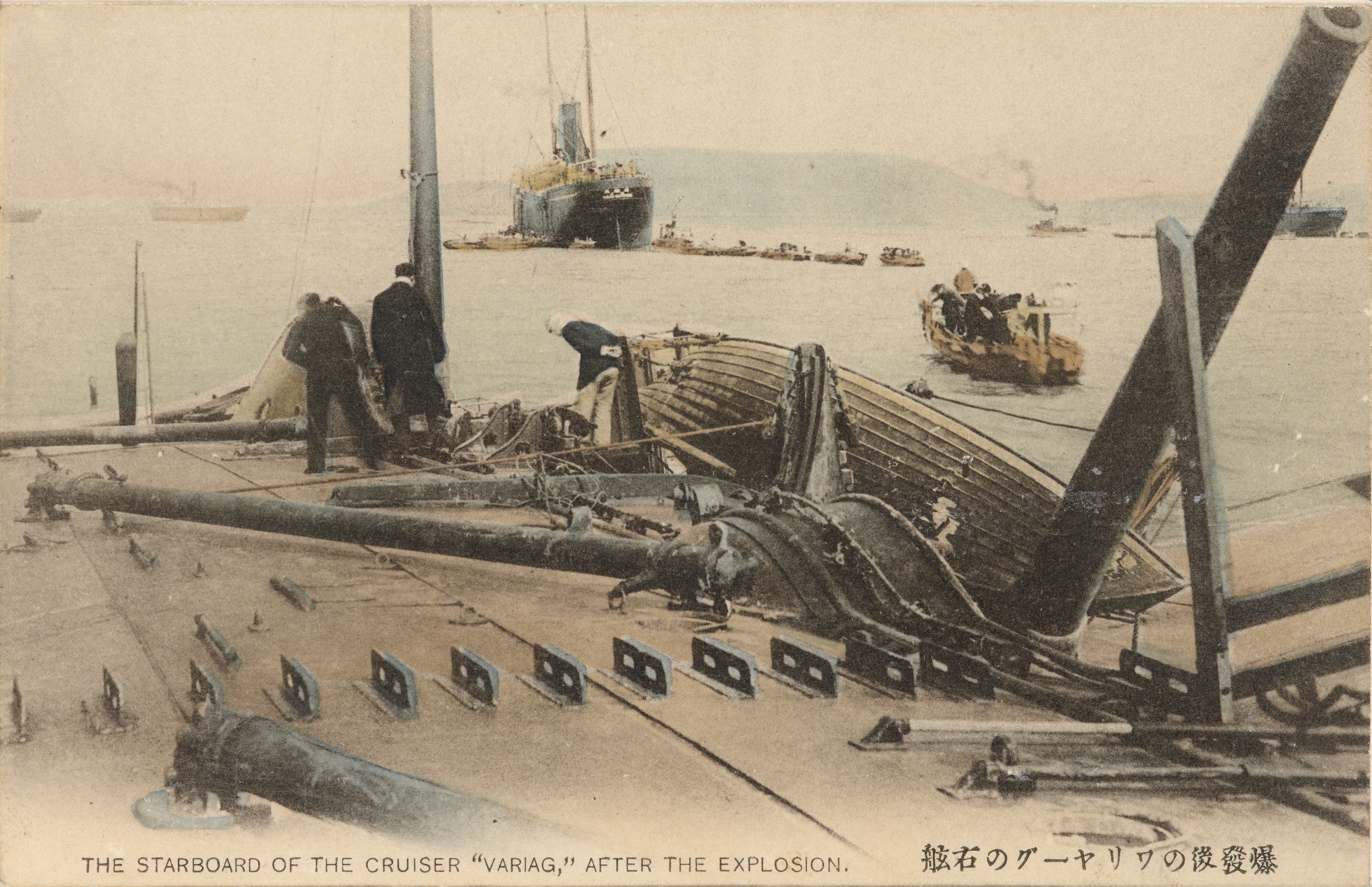
Russian cruiser Varyag after explosion, 1904

Uryū ordered the cruisers Chiyoda, Takachiho, Asama and his torpedo boats to proceed up the channel with the troopships to commence the debarkation at once, while the cruisers Naniwa, Niitaka and Akashi were held in reserve. Three torpedo-boats took refuge near Niitaka far board.

At 18:00 on 8 February, Japanese troopships anchored at Chemulpo, mooring next to the Russians, and disembarked four battalions of soldiers of the IJA 12th Division in an operation that continued into the night. To the amazement of the tense Japanese, the Russians aboard Varyag and Korietz took no action, but continued to air out bunting as if on parade. The troop disembarkation was complete by 03:00 on 9 February, and all Japanese warships and transports withdrew from the harbor except for the Chiyoda. The latter delivered a letter to Varyag and neutral vessels, including the British cruiser Talbot, the French cruiser Pascal, the Italian cruiser Elba, and the U.S. gunboat Vicksburg and collier Pompey.

HIS IMPERIAL JAPANESE MAJESTY'S SHIP NANIWA
Chemulpo Roadstead, February 8. 1904.

Sir: I have the honor to notify you that as hostilities exist between the Empire of Japan and the Empire of Russia at present I shall attack the men-of-war of the Government of Russia, stationed at present in the port of Chemulpo, with the force under my command, in case of the refusal of the Russian senior naval officer present at Chemulpo to my demand to leave the port of Chemulpo before the noon of the 9th of February, 1904, and I respectfully request you to keep away from the scene of action in the port so that no danger from the action would come to the ship under your command. The above-mentioned attack will not take place before 4 o'clock p. m. of the 9th of February, 1904, to give time to put into practice the above-mentioned request.

If there are any transports or merchant vessels of your nationality in the port of Chemulpo at present, I request you to communicate to them the above notification.

I have the honor to be, sir, your most obedient servant,

S. URIU

A conference was quickly convened on Talbot by Captain Vsevolod Rudnev and the captains of neutral warships (except Vicksburg), and it was decided that the Russians would fight their way out.

At noon, Captain Denis Bagly of Talbot came to Naniwa with a letter signed by all of the neutral captains except for the captain of Vicksburg, W.A. Marshall, declining the request to change anchorage, on the grounds that Chemulpo was a neutral port.

Outgunned and outnumbered, and refusing advice from the neutral captains to surrender, at 11:00 on 9 February, Captain Vsevolod Rudnev of Varyag attempted to make a break for the open sea.

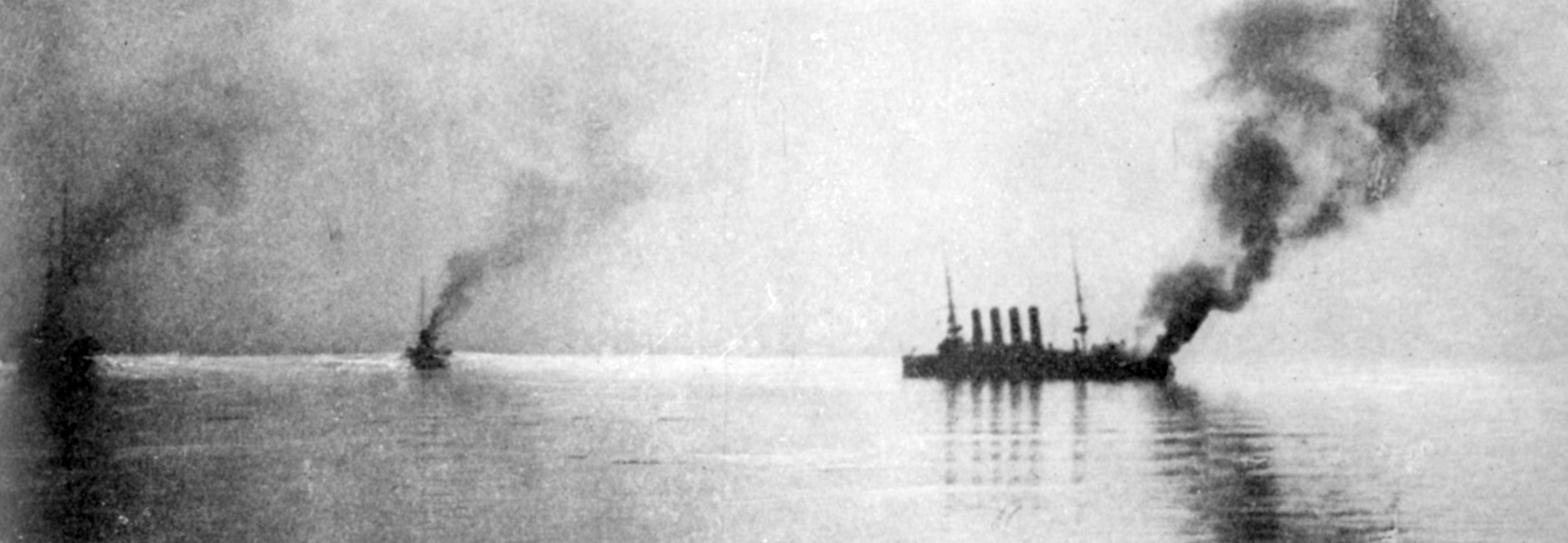
Varyag crippled and burning in Chemulpo harbour

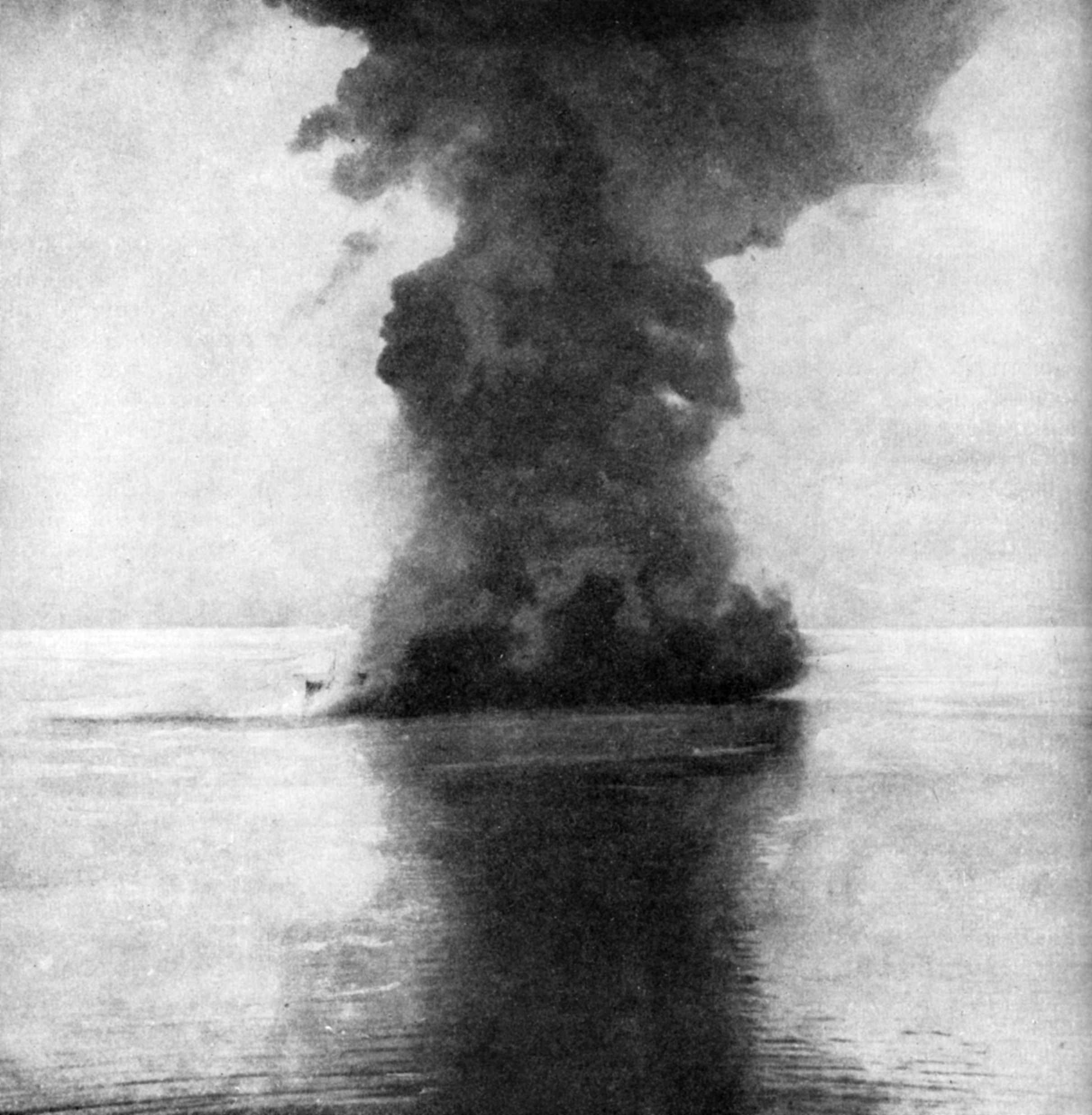
The gunboat Korietz burns after having been scuttled

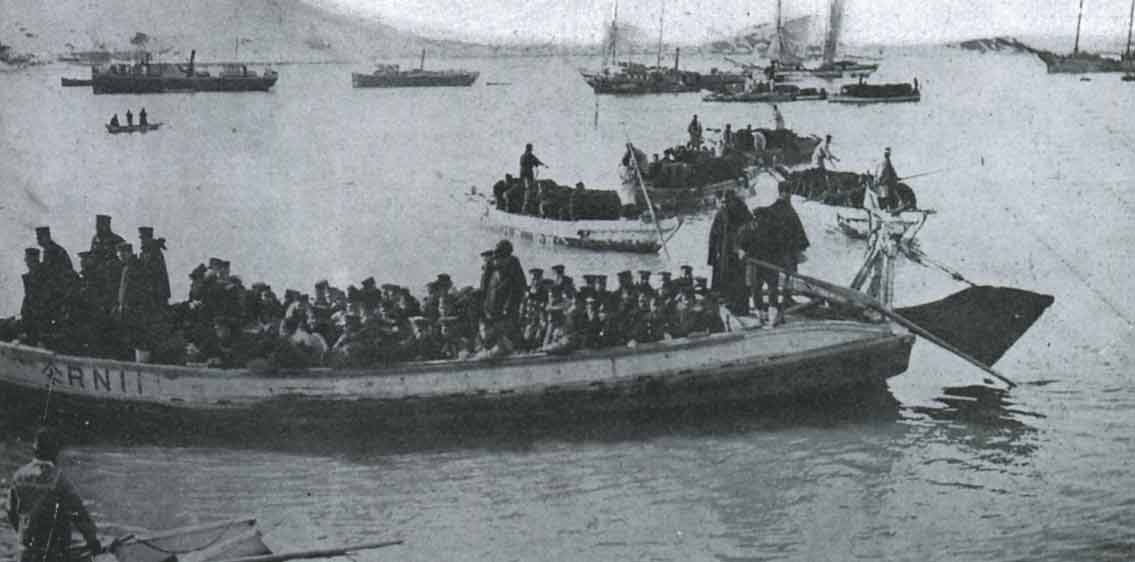
Japanese marines landing on the Bay

From the Varyag logbook:

- 11:10 All hands on deck on Varyag.
- 11:20 Cruiser goes to open sea, Korietz in 1 cable length (200 meters) behind. English and Italian crews cheer Russians; on the Italian cruiser Elba the Russian anthem is played.
- 11:25 Battle alarm on Varyag. Japanese cruisers Asama, Naniwa, Takachiho, Chiyoda, Akashi and Niitaka in bearing line from Richy island to Northern passage. Japanese torpedo-boats behind cruisers.
- 11:45 Varyag opens fire with port guns.
- 11:47 Asama opens fire with 8-inch gun; all Japanese squadron then open fire.
- One of the first Japanese shells that hit cruiser, destroyed the port wing of front bridge, set fire in chart house and broke the fore shrouds. Junior navigating officer midshipman Count Alexey Nirod was killed, all personnel on range finding station #1 were killed or wounded.
- Damaged 10.2" gun #3, all personnel killed or wounded, battery commander midshipman Gubonin was wounded, but refused to go away until he fall. Fire on bow and quarterdeck (was put out by midshipman Chernilovsky-Sokol). With the same shell, that caused fire was damaged guns: 10.2" #8 and #9, 75mm #21 47mm #27 and #28. With other hits was nearly destroyed main battle top, destroyed range finding station #2, damaged guns #31 and #32, fire in lockers on accommodation deck (was put out lively).
- 12:05 After passing traverse of "Yo-dol-mi" island trunk with rudder drive was damaged. At the same time, Captain Rudnev was shell-shocked in head by fragments of another shell, hitting foremast. Staff-bugler and drummer, who stay astride him was deadly killed, helmsman petty officer Snegirev was badly wounded in back, and orderly of captain quartermaster Chibisov was lightly wounded too. Ship from now was steered from steering compartment, but orders were stiffed, so course permanently was corrected with engines. At strong current cruiser steered badly.
- 12:15 Willing to go out of fire range to repair as possible steering drive and put out fires in different places begin to turn with machines, as cruiser steered badly. Near Yo-dol-mi island engines on full back.
- Cruiser was put in disadvantage position relatively to island when steering drive was broken with rudder at 15–20° on port side.
- Distance to enemy shortens to 28–30 cable length, fire strengthens, hits increase.
- Near the same time large caliber shell hit port side under water, water gushed into huge hole, stokehold #3 begins to full with water, which level raised up to furnaces. Chief Officer and chief boatswain placed patch under the hole, water was pumped all time, its level decreased continuously, but cruiser continue to listing at port side.
- With shell passing through officer cabins, which were wrecked, deck was pierced and meal in provision berth was inflamed. Then cot netting at waist under the sick quarters was pierced, wherein fragments get into sick quarters, cots in netting catch fire, which was put out lively. Serious damage forced us to get out of fire range for a more long time, that is why we come to roadstead at full speed, firing with port and bow guns.
- Throughout the battle with one shot of 10.2" gun #XII bow bridge of Asama cruiser was destroyed and put afire, Asama stop fire for some time. bow turret on her was apparently damaged, as it not fired up to the end of battle.
- 12:40 With cruiser approached the berth and Japanese fire become dangerous for neutral ships on roadstead, two cruiser pursuing us stop the fire and return to the rest of squadron out of Yo-dol-mi island.
- 12:45 Distance to the Japanese so increased, that our fire become ineffective, so we stop it.

An early film, depicting a re-enactment of the Battle of Chemulpo Bay (Film produced in 1904 by Edison Studios)

Although the Russian logbook records damage to Asama, Japanese records indicate that she took no damage.

Unable to break past the Japanese squadron by mid-afternoon, Korietz and the badly battered Varyag returned to Chemulpo harbor at 13:15, where both took refuge near the neutral warships. At 16:00, Korietz was scuttled by her crew by blowing up two powder-rooms. Fragments of the blown-up ship landed dangerously close to neutral vessels. Fearing a greater explosion with potential casualties, the captains of the neutral warships present urged Rudnev not to blow up Varyag in a similar manner. At 18:10, scuttled by her crew, Varyag rolled over on her port side and sank. Crewmen from Varyag were dispatched to the Russian transport Sungari, which had remained behind in the harbor during the battle, and set her on fire to prevent her from falling into Japanese hands.

== Outcome ==
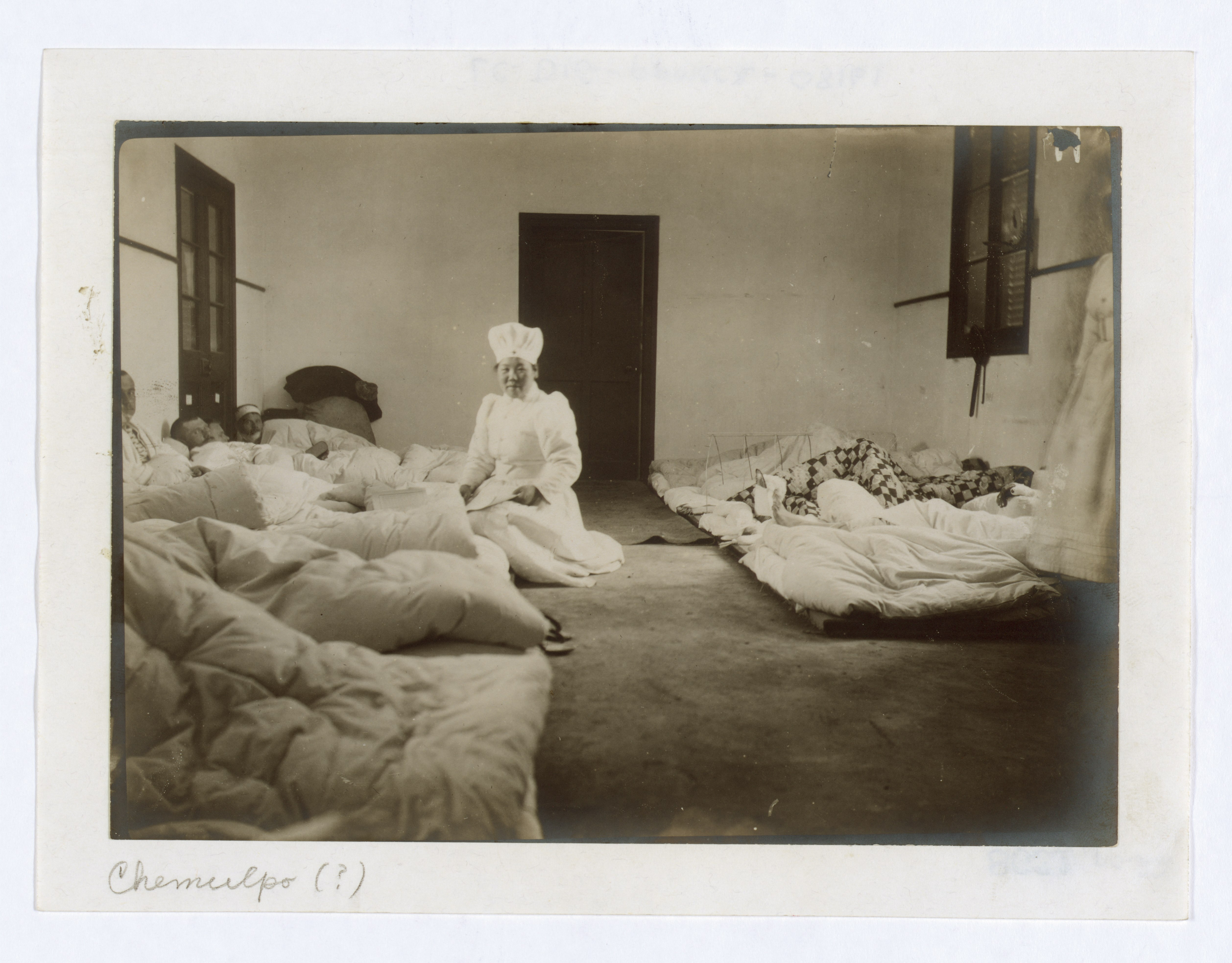
Japanese Red Cross nurses at Chemulpo attend Russian sailors wounded in battle February 9, 1904

The Battle of Chemulpo was a military victory for the Japanese. Russian casualties on the Varyag were heavy. All of Varyag's twelve 6 in (150 mm) guns, all of her 12-pounders, and all of her 3-pounders were out of action, she took 5 serious hits at or below the waterline. Her upper works and ventilators were riddled, and her crew had put out at least five serious fires. Of her crew with a nominal strength of 580, 33 were killed and 97 wounded. Most serious cases among the Russian wounded were treated at the Red Cross hospital at Chemulpo. The Russian crews—except for the badly wounded—returned to Russia on neutral warships and were treated as heroes. Although severely damaged, Varyag—not blown up—was later raised by the Japanese and incorporated into the Imperial Japanese Navy as the training ship Soya.

== See also ==
- List of battles of the Russo-Japanese War
