= Russian cruiser Varyag (1899) =

Russian protected cruiser

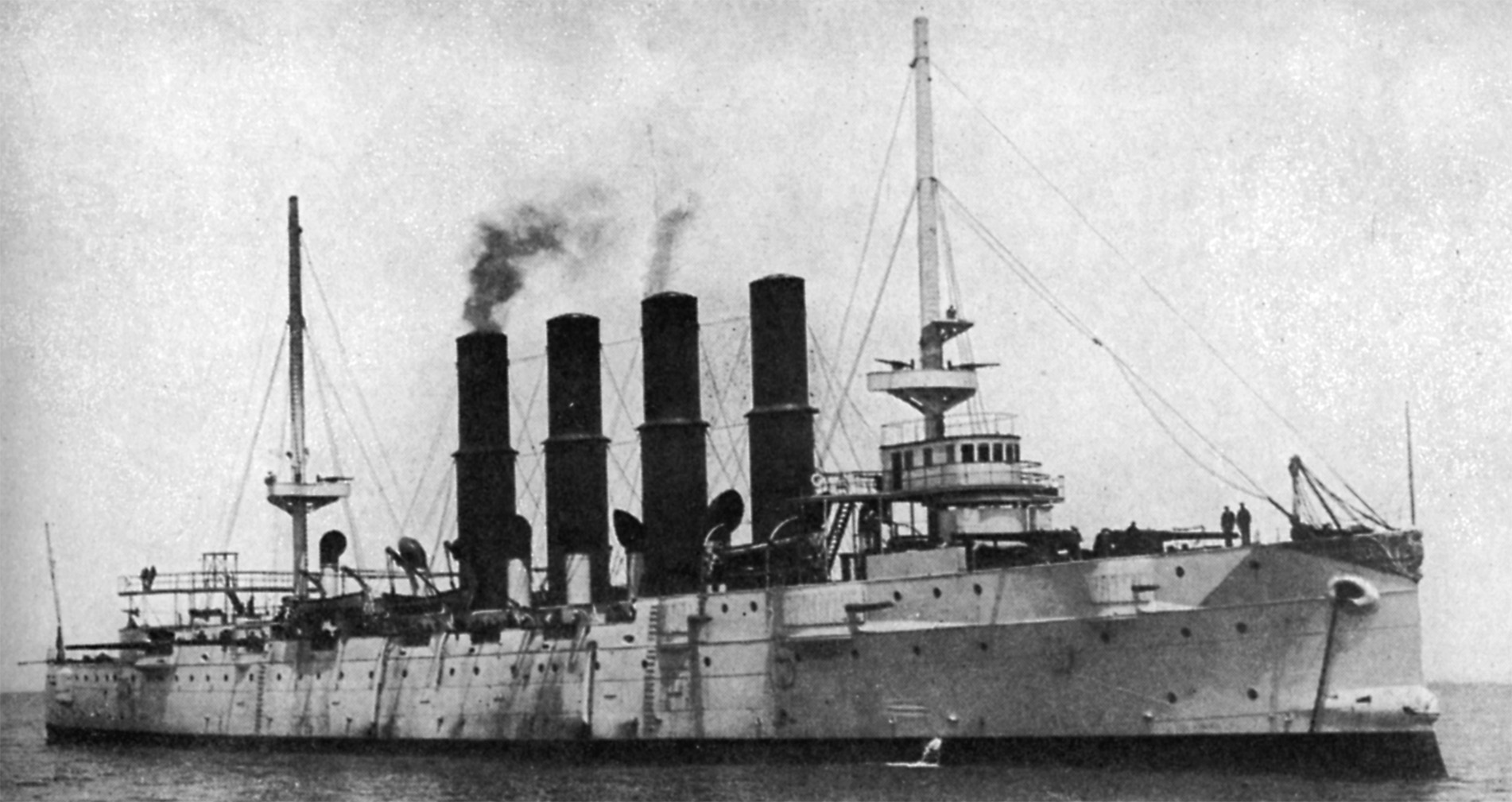
- Varyag c. 1904

History

Russian Empire
- Name: Varyag
- Namesake: Russian name for the Varangians
- Builder: William Cramp & Sons, Philadelphia
- Yard number: 301
- Laid down: October 1898
- Launched: 31 October 1899
- Commissioned: 2 January 1901 O.S.: (14 January 1901 N.S.)
- Fate: Scuttled, 9 February 1904

Empire of Japan
- Name: Soya
- Acquired: by Japan as prize of war
- Commissioned: 9 July 1907
- Fate: Returned to Russia, 5 April 1916

Russian Empire
- Name: Varyag
- Acquired: 5 April 1916
- Out of service: seized by Great Britain February 1918
- Fate: Ran aground 5 February 1920, scrapped 1925 Firth of Clyde

General characteristics
- Type: Protected cruiser
- Displacement: 6,500 long tons (6,604 t)
- Length: 129.6 m (425 ft 2 in) w/l
- Beam: 15.8 m (51 ft 10 in)
- Draught: 6.3 m (20 ft 8 in)
- Installed power: 30 Niclausse boilers; 20,000 ihp (15,000 kW)
- Propulsion: 2 shafts; triple-expansion steam engines
- Speed: 23 knots (43 km/h; 26 mph)
- Complement: 570
- Armament: 12 × 1 - 152 mm (6 in) guns; 12 × 1 - 75 mm (3.0 in) guns; 8 × 1 - 47 mm (1.9 in) guns; 2 × 1 - 37 mm (1.5 in) guns; 6 × 1 - 381 mm (15.0 in) above-water torpedo tubes (1 bow, 1 stern, 2 per side)

Varyag (Russian: Варя́г) sometimes also spelled Variag, was a Russian protected cruiser. Varyag became famous for her crew's stoicism at the Battle of Chemulpo Bay. She was acquired as a prize of war during the Russo-Japanese War by the Imperial Japanese Navy, who renamed her Soya and was later returned to the Russian Imperial Navy during World War I.

== Construction and design ==
In 1897, the Russian Admiralty, as part of a program to reinforce the Imperial Russian Navy's Far East Fleet, published specifications for a fast protected cruiser, capable of commerce raiding. The ships were required to be armed with 152 mm (6-inch) quick-firing guns, and to have a speed of 23–24 kn (43–44 km/h; 26–28 mph). Russian shipyards were already busy, and the Imperial Admiralty placed an order with the American shipyard William Cramp & Sons of Philadelphia on 11 April 1898 to build a single cruiser, Varyag against this specification. Single ships were also ordered from the German shipyards Germaniawerft (Askold) and AG Vulcan (Bogatyr) against these specifications. Varyag was laid down in October 1898, was launched on 31 October 1899 and commissioned into the Imperial Russian Navy on 2 January 1901 O.S. (14 January 1901 N.S.), (Note: Varyag was commissioned on 2 January 1901 according to the Old Style Julian calendar still used by the Russian Empire: this corresponded to 14 January in the Gregorian calendar in use in the Europe, the US and elsewhere.) under the command of Captain Vladimir Behr.

Varyag was 129.56 m (430 ft) long overall and 127.90 m (420 ft) between perpendiculars, with a beam of 15.85 m (50 ft) and a draught of 5.94 m (19 ft 6 in) at normal displacement. Design displacement was 6,500 long tons (6,604 t) with full load displacement about 7,020 long tons (7,133 t). Thirty Niclausse water-tube boilers fed steam to two sets of four-cylinder vertical triple expansion steam engines rated at 21,000 ihp (16,000 kW) which drove two 3-bladed propellers.

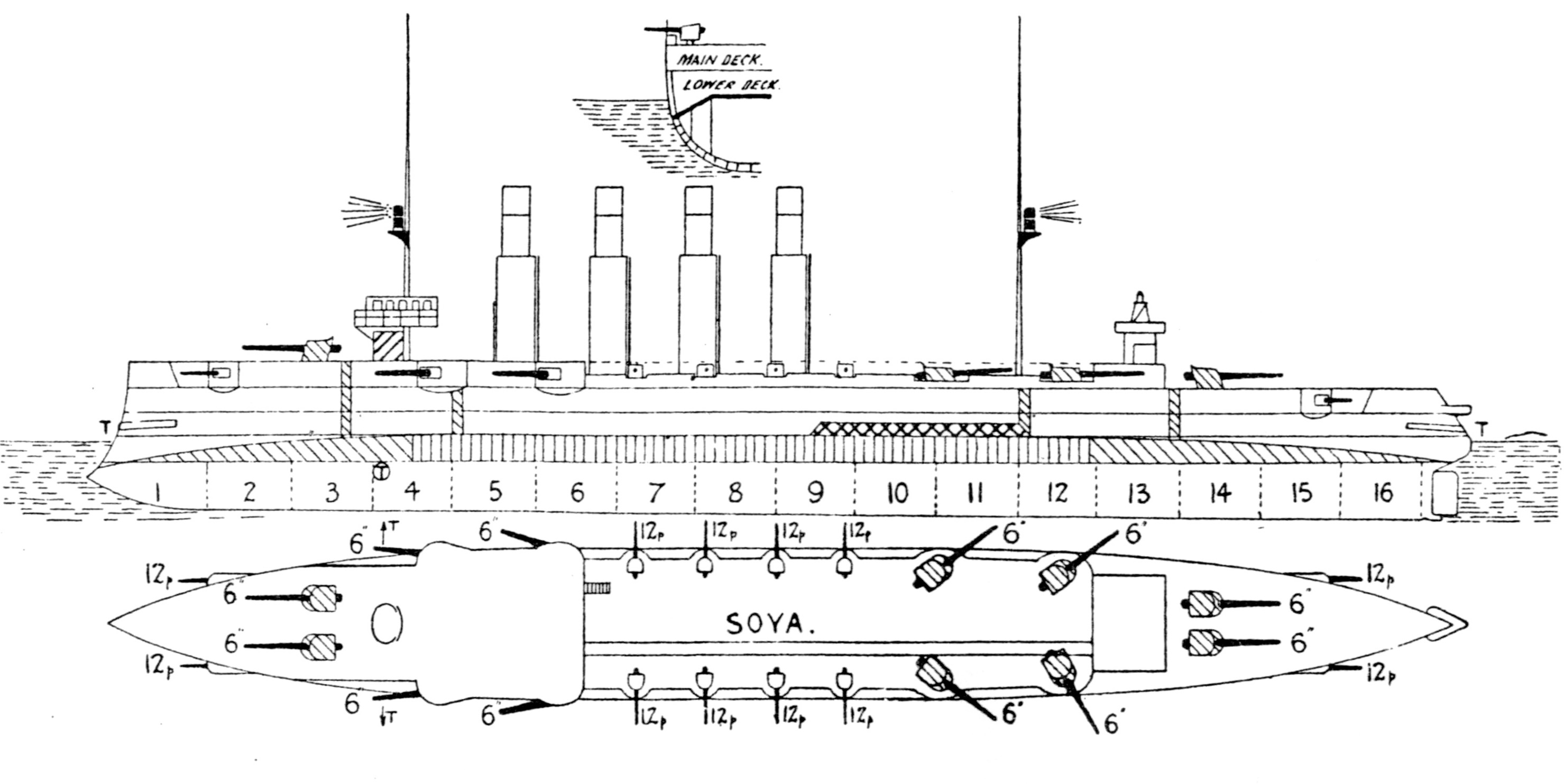
Artillery layout on Varyag

As a protected cruiser, the main protection consisted of an arched armoured deck which protected the ship's engines and magazines. The deck was 38 mm (1.5 in) thick in the central horizontal portion, and 76.2 mm (3 in) thick in the sloping sections towards the ship's sides. The ship's conning tower was protected by 150 mm (6 in), with 38 mm (1 1/2 in) protecting the ammunition hoists and 76 mm (3 in) for the bow and stern torpedo tubes. The ship's main armament was twelve Obukhoff 152 mm (6-inch) L/45 guns, with two guns side by side on the ship's forecastle, two side-by-side on the quarterdeck, and the remaining eight on sponsons on the ship's upper deck. These guns could fire a 50 kg (110 lb) shell to a range of 9,800 m (10,700 yd), and at a rate of 6 rounds per minute. 2388 rounds of 152 mm ammunition were carried. Twelve 75 mm (2.95 in) L/50 QF guns defended the ship against torpedo boats, and could fire a 6 kg (13 lb) shell to a range of 7,000 m (23,000 ft) at a rate of 10 rounds per minute. Close-in defence was provided by four Hotchkiss 47 mm revolving cannon on fighting tops, with four more on the upper deck, backed up by two 37 mm guns and two machine guns. Two Baranowski 64 mm landing guns were also carried for on-shore use by the ship's marines. Six 381 mm (15 inch) torpedo tubes were carried, two on each broadside and one in the bow and stern.

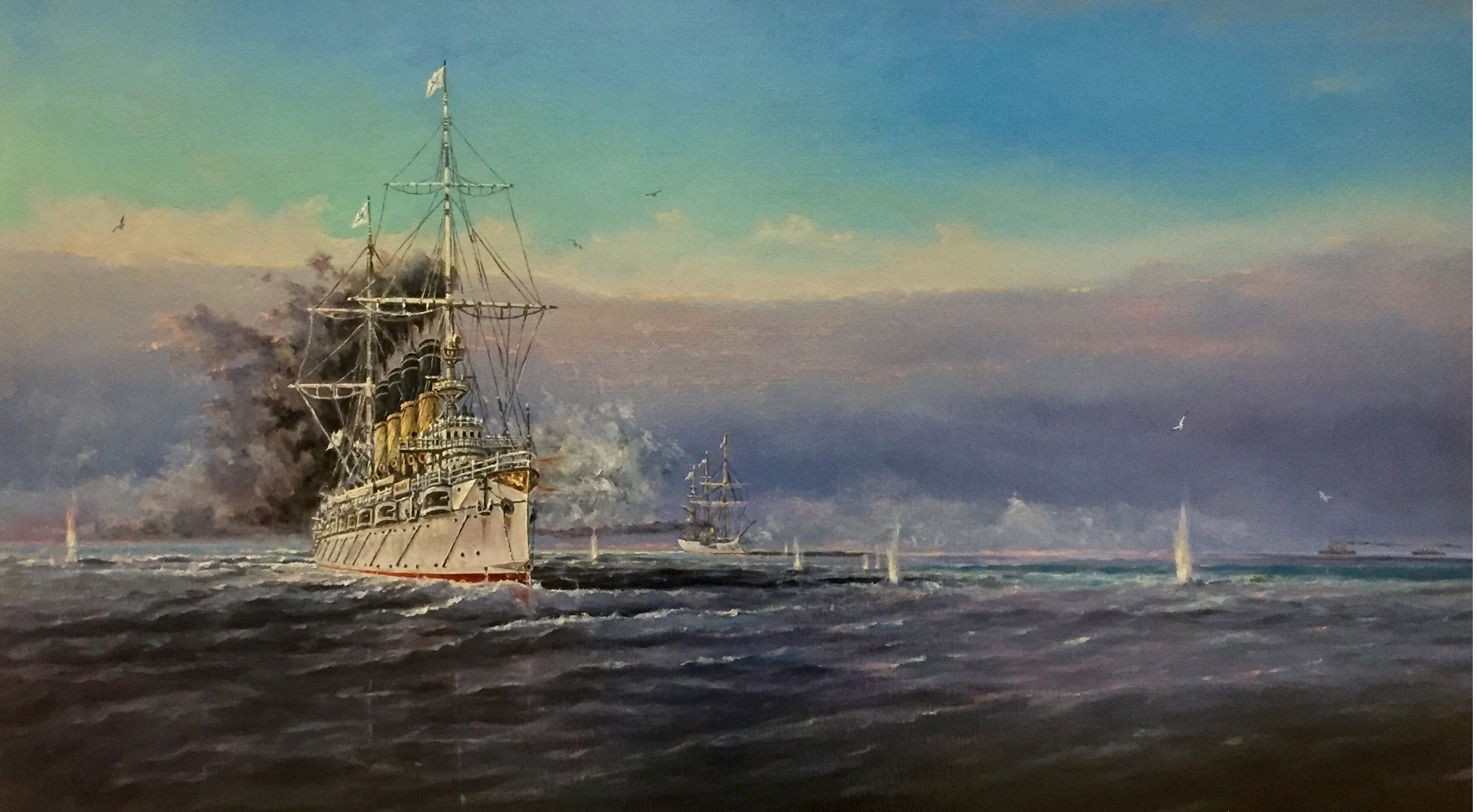
Painting by Vladimir Kosov. Fight at Chemulpo. The last parade of the cruiser Varyag.

During her construction, an assistant physician, Leo Alexandroff, left the ship's advance party on 20 April 1899, and applied for U.S. citizenship. He was arrested for desertion. His case reached the United States Supreme Court, which ruled in Tucker v. Alexandroff that the ship, though not accepted for service in the Imperial Russian Navy, was a warship under the terms of the 1832 treaty between Russia and the United States; thus Alexandroff would be returned to Russian authorities.

== First Russian service ==
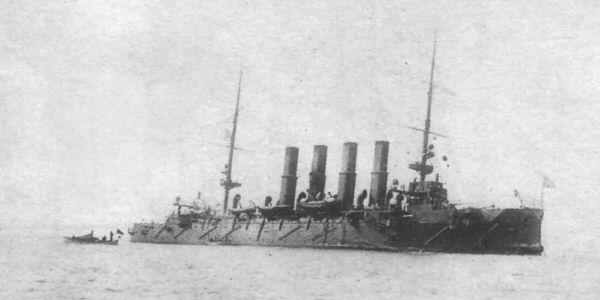
Varyag damaged after the Battle of Chemulpo Bay, just before being scuttled.

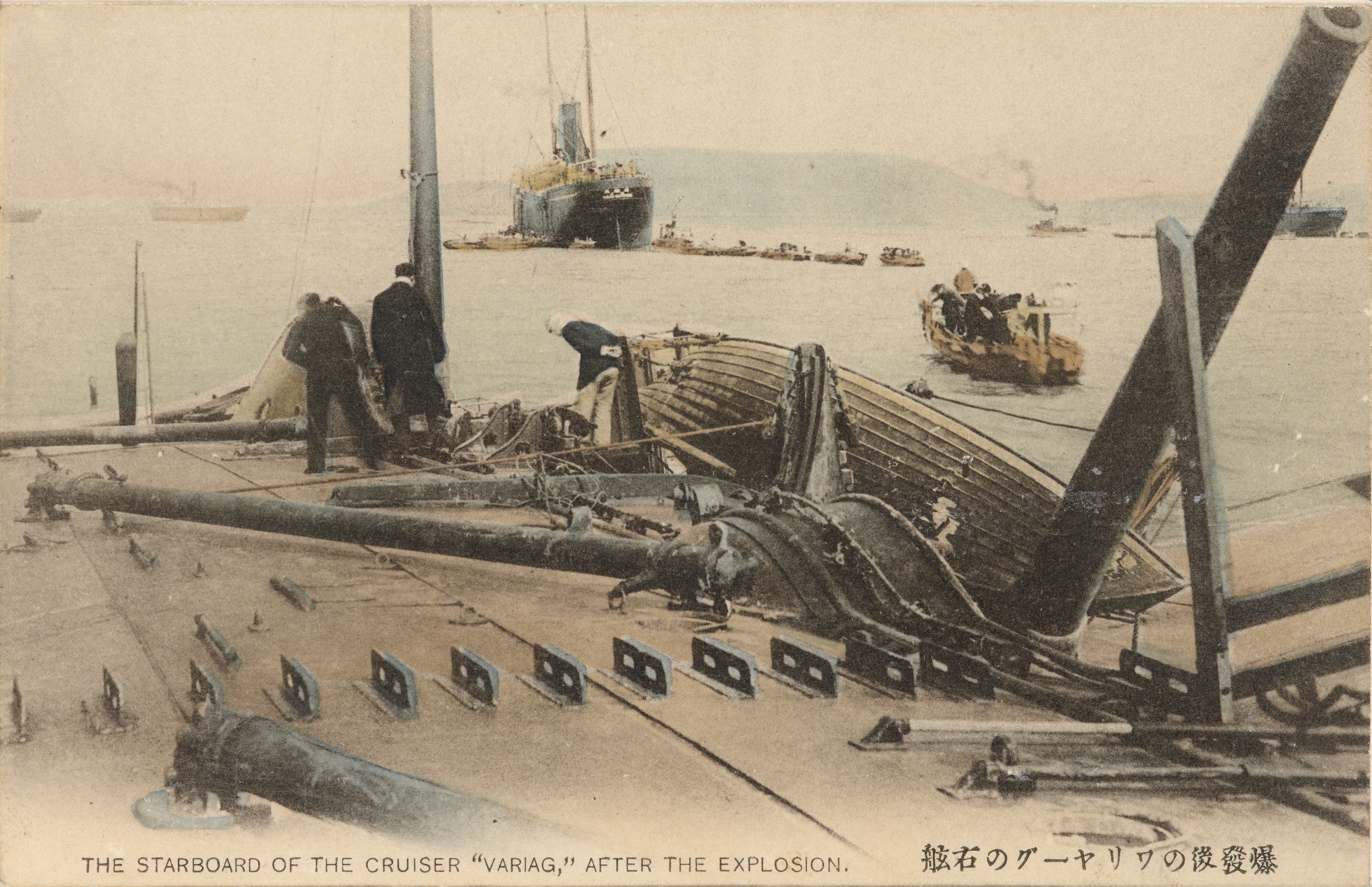
Russian cruiser Varyag after explosion, 1904

At the outbreak of the Russo-Japanese War, under the command of Captain Vsevolod Rudnev, Varyag was stationed at Chemulpo Bay with the aging gunboat Korietz. On 8 February 1904, a large Japanese force under Admiral Uriu blockaded the Russian in the harbor. As Chemulpo was in neutral Korean waters, Admiral Uriu gave the Russian ships a written ultimatum to sail by 12:00 noon or be attacked in the harbor itself. Captain Rudnev attempted to fight his way out, but after sustaining heavy casualties (31 men dead, 191 injured out of 570) and outgunned, both ships returned to harbor by 1:00 p.m., the crew decided to scuttle both ships. The crew was saved by transferring them to the British cruiser Talbot, the French cruiser Pascal, and the Italian cruiser Elba; the captain of the US gunboat Vicksburg declined doing so as a violation of U.S. neutrality.

In 1907, Vsevolod Rudnev (by that time dismissed from Russian naval service in the rank of rear admiral) was decorated with the Japanese Order of the Rising Sun for his heroism in that battle; although he accepted the order, he never wore it in public.

== Japanese cruiser Soya ==
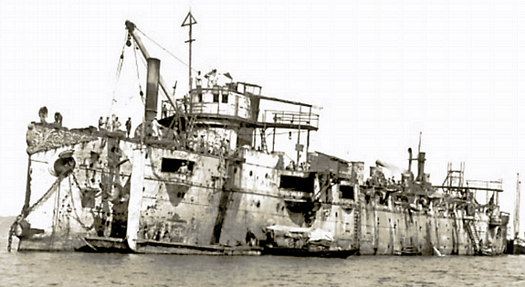
Varyag after being salvaged by the Japanese.

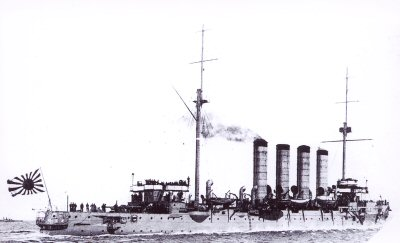
Varyag in Japanese service as Soya

After the Russo-Japanese War, the Japanese raised the badly damaged wreck from Chemulpo harbor, repaired it, and commissioned it into the Imperial Japanese Navy as the cruiser Soya on 9 July 1907. Its new name was taken from the northernmost cape of Hokkaidō, Soya Misaki.

After being placed into Japanese service as a cruiser, Soya was used primarily for training duties. From 14 March 1909 to 7 August 1909, it made a long distance navigational and officer cadet training cruise to Hawaii and North America. It repeated this training cruise every year until 1913.

== Return to Russia ==
During World War I, Russia and Japan were allies and several ships were transferred by the Japanese to the Russians. Along with Peresvet and Poltava, she was repurchased by the Imperial Russian Navy at Vladivostok on 5 April 1916 and renamed Varyag. In June, she departed for Murmansk via the Indian Ocean, arriving in November 1916. She was sent to Liverpool in Great Britain for an overhaul by Cammell Laird in February 1917, and was due to re-enter service with the Arctic Ocean Flotilla of the Imperial Russian Navy. However, following the Russian October Revolution on 7 November 1917, crewmen who had remained onboard hoisted the red flag and refused to set sail. On 8 December 1917 she was seized by a detachment of British soldiers. Assigned to the Royal Navy in February 1918, she ran aground while under tow off of Ireland, but was refloated and used as a hulk until 1919. She was then sold to a German firm in 1920 for scrap, but on 5 February 1920 ran aground on rocks near the Scottish village of Lendalfoot (55°11′03″N 04°56′30″W) in the Firth of Clyde, while being towed to Germany. She was scrapped in place from 1923 to 1925.

== Legacy ==
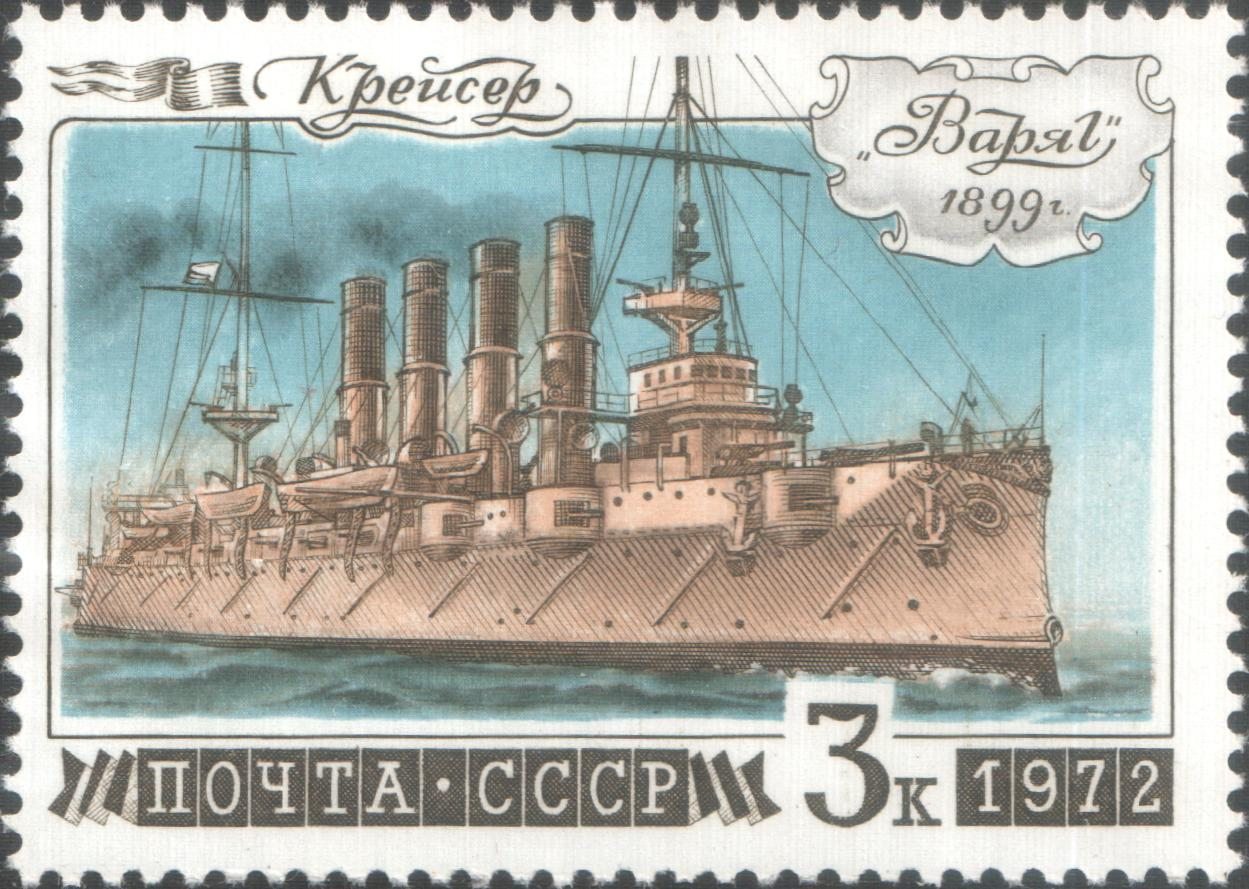
Soviet postage stamp of 1972 honoring the cruiser Varyag

The stoicism of Varyag's crew at Chemulpo has inspired the Austrian poet Rudolf Greinz to write a poem dedicated to Varyag. The Russian translation of this poem was put to music by A.S. Turischev. The result was the 1904 song that remains popular today:

(German original)
Auf Deck, Kameraden, all' auf Deck!
Heraus zur letzten Parade!
Der stolze Warjag ergibt sich nicht,
Wir brauchen keine Gnade!

(Russian poetic translation)
Наверх вы, товарищи, все по местам!
Последний парад наступает.
Врагу не сдается наш гордый “Варяг”,
Пощады никто не желает.

(translation)
Get up, you comrades, everyone to his place,
The final parade is at hand.
Our proud "Varyag" will not surrender to the enemy,
No one wants mercy.
Rudolf Greinz

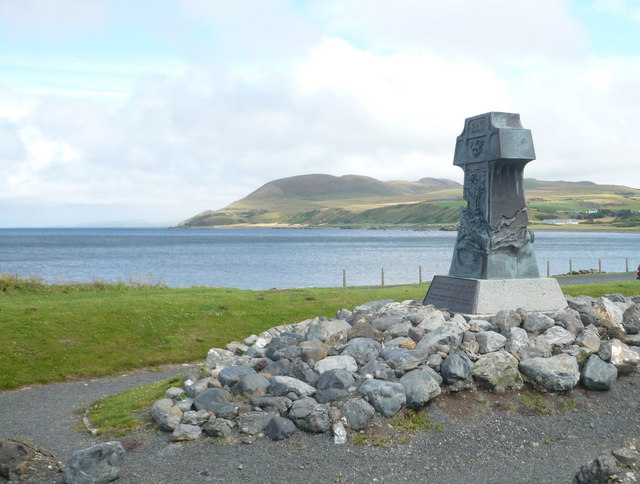
The Varyag memorial at Lendalfoot looks over the Firth of Clyde.

On 30 July 2006 (Russian Navy Day), a memorial plaque to the cruiser was unveiled at Lendalfoot in a ceremony attended by senior Russian politicians and navy personnel, veterans and local dignitaries.

On 8 September 2007 a monument in the form of a large bronze cross was unveiled as an addition to the Lendalfoot memorial, in a ceremony attended by former Nato Secretary General George Robertson, British and Russian navy officers and diplomats. The "Cruiser Varyag" Charity Foundation had organised a competition in Russia for the design of the monument.

In 2010, as a gesture marking the 20th anniversary of diplomatic relations between Korea and Russia, the flag of Varyag was restored. The Japanese Navy recovered the flag when the ship was salvaged; and the Incheon Metropolitan Museum acquired them after Japan's defeat at the end of World War II. The return of the flag takes the form of a two-year renewable loan because of the Korean law protecting cultural assets.

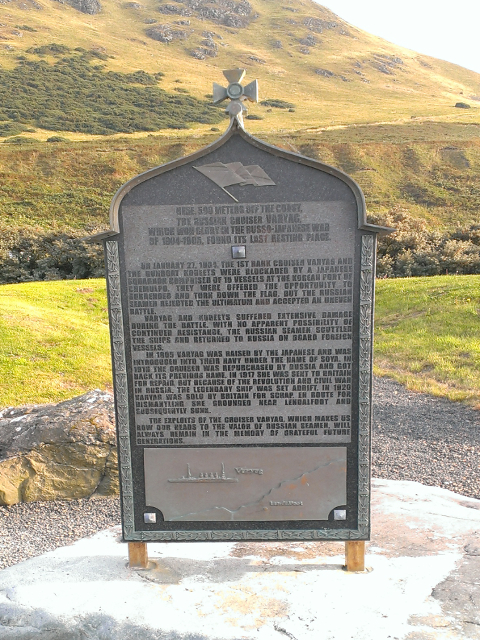
Obverse of plaque at Varyag memorial at Lendalfoot, Scotland.

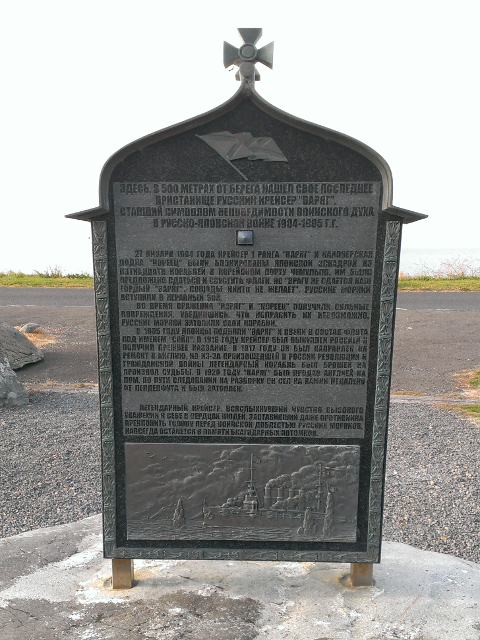
everse of plaque at Varyag memorial at Lendalfoot, Scotland.

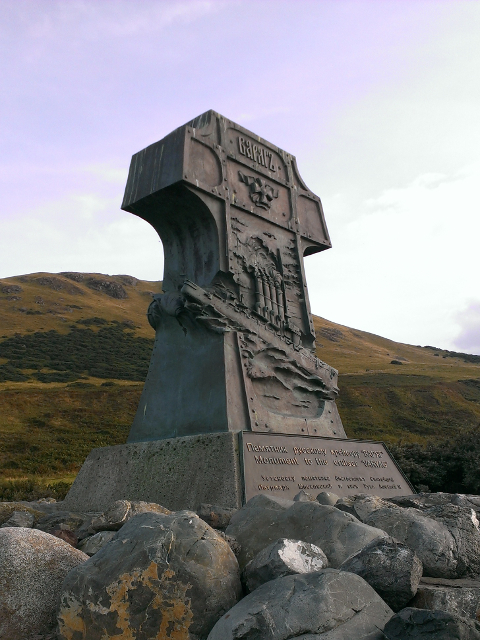
Obverse of monument at Varyag memorial at Lendalfoot, Scotland.

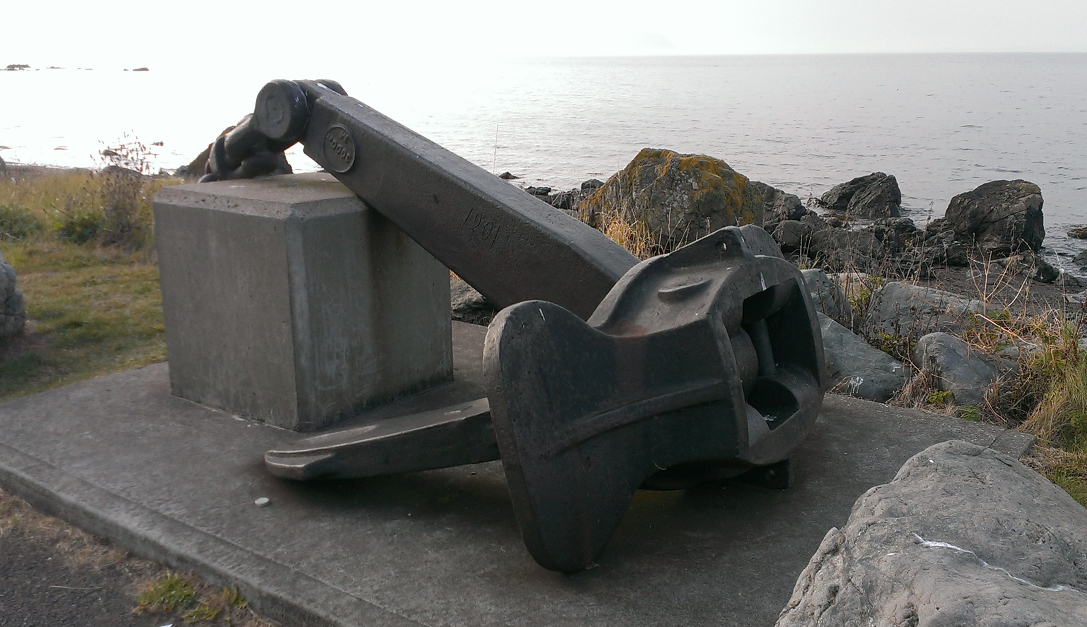
Anchor at Varyag memorial at Lendalfoot, Scotland.
