= Uryū Sotokichi =

Japanese politician

Baron Uryū Sotokichi
- 瓜生 外吉
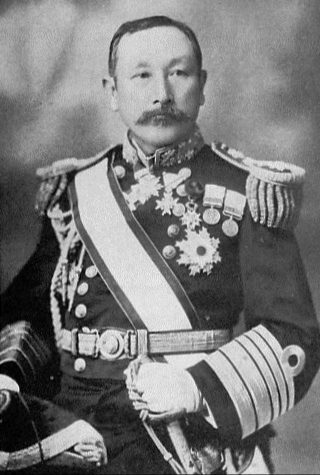
- Born: 2 January 1857; Daishōji, Kaga, Japan
- Died: 11 November 1937 (aged 80); Odawara, Kanagawa, Japan
- Burial place: Aoyama Cemetery
- Spouse: Nagai Shigeko (m. 1882; died 1928)
- Military career
- Allegiance: Empire of Japan
- Branch: Imperial Japanese Navy
- Service years: 1871–1927
- Rank: Admiral
- Commands: Akagi; Akitsushima; Fusō; Matsushima; Yashima; Sasebo Naval District; Yokosuka Naval District
- Conflicts: First Sino-Japanese War; Russo-Japanese War; Battle of Chemulpo Bay; Battle of Tsushima
- Awards: Order of the Rising Sun (1st class); Order of the Golden Kite

Member of the House of Peers
- In office 1922–1925 Elected by the Barons

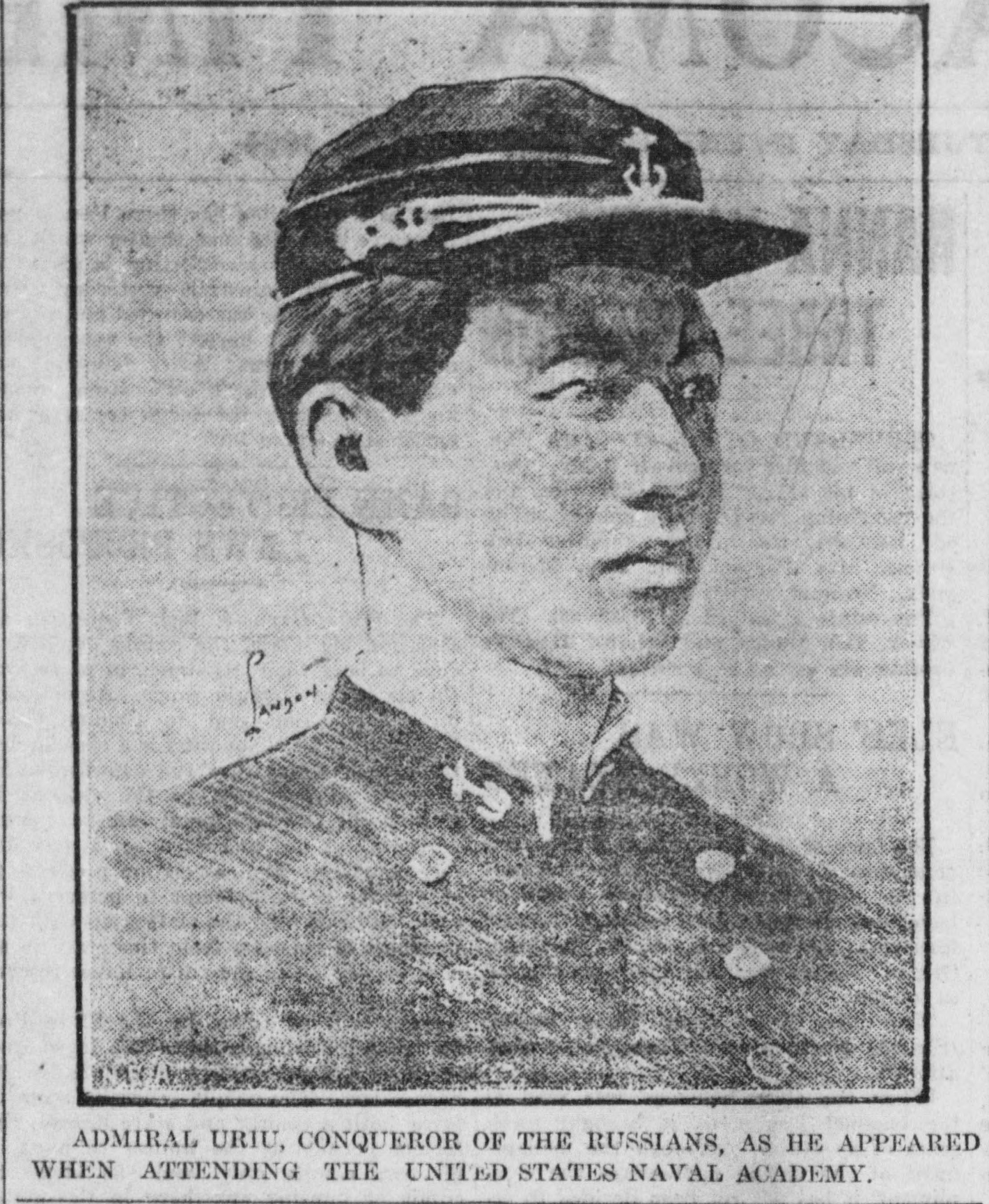
Uryū, in the uniform of the United States Naval Academy.

Baron Uryū Sotokichi (瓜生 外吉; 2 January 1857 – 11 November 1937) was an early admiral of the Imperial Japanese Navy, active in the Russo-Japanese War, most notably at the Battle of Chemulpo Bay and the Battle of Tsushima. His name has sometimes been transliterated as "Uriu Sotokichi", or "Uriu Sotokitchi", a transliteration of older kana spelling. The spelling is different by current accepted methods of transliteration, but the pronunciation is the same as the modern spelling for Uryū (うりゅう). He was a lifelong proponent of better ties with the United States.

== Biography ==
Uryū was the second son of a samurai in service of Daishōji Domain (present day Daishōji in Ishikawa prefecture). He attended a mission school in Tsukiji, Tokyo and was converted to Protestantism in 1874. He became one of the first cadets of the Imperial Japanese Naval Academy but did not graduate; instead, he was then sent to the US Naval Academy in Annapolis on 9 June 1875, returning on 2 October 1881

Commissioned as a lieutenant, Uryū served aboard various ships throughout the 1880s, including the corvette Kaimon, the ironclad Fusō, and the sloop Nisshin. On 23 July 1891, he assumed his first command: the gunboat Akagi. Promoted to captain in 1891, he was then posted as naval attaché to France from 5 September 1892 to 31 August 1896.

After the outbreak of the First Sino-Japanese War, Uryū briefly commanded the new cruiser Akitsushima, followed by his old ship Fusō.

On 28 December 1897, Uryū faced a court-martial over a collision in the Seto Inland Sea in stormy weather between the cruisers Itsukushima and Matsushima, and was sentenced to prison for three months from 5 April 1898. However, this did not hurt his career, as he was appointed captain of Matsushima on 1 February 1899, and the battleship Yashima on 16 June 1898.

He became a rear admiral and Chief of the Imperial Japanese Navy General Staff on 21 May 1900.

Uryū was promoted to vice admiral on 6 June 1904. During the Russo-Japanese War, he commanded the Second Squadron at the Battle of Chemulpo Bay which resulted in the destruction of the Russian cruiser Varyag and gunboat Korietz. For his war service, he was decorated with the Order of the Rising Sun (1st class) and the Order of the Golden Kite (2nd class) in 1906.

He was made commander of the Sasebo Naval District on 22 November 1906, he was ennobled with the title of danshaku (baron) under the kazoku peerage system on 21 September 1907.

Appointed commander of the Yokosuka Naval District on 1 December 1909, Uryū was made a full admiral on 16 October 1912. He was the official representative from Japan at the opening ceremonies for the Panama Canal in 1914. From 1922 to 1925, he served on the House of Peers in the Diet of Japan. He entered the reserve list in 1927, and died in 1937.

His grave is at Aoyama Cemetery in Tokyo.

== Decorations ==
- 1892 – Order of the Sacred Treasure, 6th class
- 1896 – Order of the Sacred Treasure, 5th class
- 1901 – Order of the Rising Sun, 2nd class
- 1906 – Grand Cordon of the Order of the Rising Sun
- 1906 – Order of the Golden Kite, 2nd class
- 1937 – Order of the Rising Sun with Paulownia Flowers

== Notes ==
Military offices
Preceded by Arima Shinichi	Sasebo Naval District; Commander-in-chief; 22 November 1906 - 1 March 1909	Succeeded by Arima Shinichi
Preceded by Kamimura Hikonojō	Yokosuka Naval District; Commander-in-chief; 1 March 1909 - 1 December 1912	Succeeded by Hikohachi Yamada
