= Japanese cruiser Chiyoda =

Cruiser of the Imperial Japanese Navy

Coordinates: 32°54′32″N 132°15′00″E

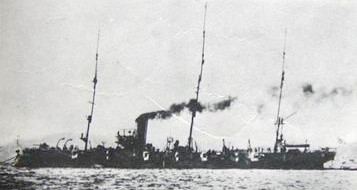
- Chiyoda around 1900

History

Empire of Japan
- Name: Chiyoda
- Ordered: 1888 Fiscal Year
- Builder: J & G Thomson
- Laid down: 4 December 1888
- Launched: 3 June 1890
- Completed: 1 January 1891
- Decommissioned: 28 February 1927
- Fate: Expended as target 5 August 1927

General characteristics
- Type: Cruiser
- Displacement: 2,439 long tons (2,478 t)
- Length: 94.49 m (310 ft 0 in) w/l
- Beam: 12.81 m (42 ft 0 in)
- Draught: 4.27 m (14 ft 0 in)
- Propulsion: 2-shaft vertical triple expansion, 6 locomotive boilers, 5,678 hp (4,234 kW)
- Speed: 19 knots (22 mph; 35 km/h)
- Complement: 350
- Armament: 10 × QF 4.7 inch /40 naval guns; 14 × QF 3 pounder Hotchkiss guns; 3 × 11-mm, 10-barrel Nordenfelt guns; 3 × 356 mm (14.0 in) torpedo tubes
- Armour: Belt: 82–92 mm (3.2–3.6 in); Deck: 30–35 mm (1.2–1.4 in); Conning tower: 30 mm (1.2 in)

Chiyoda (千代田) was a cruiser of the Imperial Japanese Navy, which served in the First Sino-Japanese War, Russo-Japanese War and World War I.

== Background ==
Chiyoda was ordered by the Meiji government as a replacement for the ill-fated Unebi, and paid for with insurance money received from the French government after that ship disappeared without a trace somewhere in the South China Sea en route to Japan. However, unwilling to use a French shipyard after the Unebi disaster, the Imperial Japanese Navy placed its order in 1889 to J & G Thomson of Glasgow, Scotland. Construction was supervised by Arai Yukan and by Ijuin Gorō, and on 11 April 1891, Chiyoda arrived safely at Yokosuka. On 5 September 1892, command of Chiyoda was assigned to Captain (later Fleet Admiral) Prince Arisugawa Takehito.

== Design ==
Chiyoda was a 'belted cruiser' based on a much scaled-down version of the Royal Navy's Nelson-class cruisers. The hull comprised 84 watertight compartments, protected with Harvey armor. Originally designed to carry 12.6-inch Canet guns, the plan was abandoned due to excessive top weight. Instead, the design was changed so that her main battery consisted of ten QF 4.7-inch /40 naval guns in single mounts, mounted one each in the bow and stern, and four on each side in sponsons. The use of the Elswick quick-firing technology resulted in an increase in the rate of fire by six-fold over previous cruiser designs. Her secondary battery consisted of 14 QF 3 pounder Hotchkiss and three 11-mm, 10-barrel Nordenfelt guns. She was also equipped with three 356 mm (14.0 in) Whitehead torpedo tubes mounted on the main deck. As was standard practice at the time, the prow was reinforced for ramming.

== Service record ==
With the outbreak of the First Sino-Japanese War, Chiyoda was assigned to patrol duties off of the coasts of Korea, China, Russia, and occasional patrols to Hokkaidō. She was present at all of the significant battles of the war, including the crucial Battle of Yalu River and the Battle of Weihaiwei. Chiyoda was also among the Japanese fleet units that participated in the invasion of Taiwan in 1895 and saw action on 3 June 1895 at the bombardment of Chinese coastal forts at Keelung.

After the war, Chiyoda went into dry dock at Kure Naval Arsenal, where the locomotive boilers on her triple expansion steam engines were replaced with more modern Belleville boilers, and the fighting tops on her three raked masts were removed to improve stability. On completion of the retrofit in 1898, Chiyoda was re-designated a 3rd class cruiser. Later that year, during the Spanish–American War, she was based at Manila to safeguard Japanese civilians and economic interests in the Philippines. During the Boxer Rebellion, she was stationed at Taku and Yantai in northern China.

During the Russo-Japanese War (1904–1905), Chiyoda had a prominent role in the opening Battle of Chemulpo Bay while commanded by Captain Murakami Kakuichi and subsequently fought at the Battle of the Yellow Sea and the Battle off Ulsan. On 27 July 1904, Chiyoda stuck a Russian naval mine but was towed to Dalian, where repairs were completed in time for her to participate in the Battle of Tsushima. On 12 January 1905, Chiyoda was captained by Captain (later Fleet Admiral) Prince Higashifushimi Yorihito.

On 28 August 1912, Chiyoda was re-designated as a 2nd-class coastal defense vessel.

During the Siege of Tsingtao in World War I, Chiyoda was part of the Japanese fleet sent to capture the Imperial German Navy base at Tsingtao in Shandong, China. Afterwards, based out of Manila, she took part in Allied patrols of the China coast against German commerce raiders.

On 14 April 1921, Chiyoda was downgraded to a destroyer tender and was used for various odd tasks, including a submarine tender and as a school ship for naval cadets.

Chiyoda was officially decommissioned on 28 February 1927 and sunk as a target during live fire exercises on 5 August 1927 in Bungo Channel by the heavy cruiser Furutaka under review of Emperor Hirohito.

After its dismantling, the bridge of Chiyoda was preserved at the Imperial Japanese Naval Academy at Etajima, Hiroshima as a reviewing stand over the parade grounds.

== Gallery ==
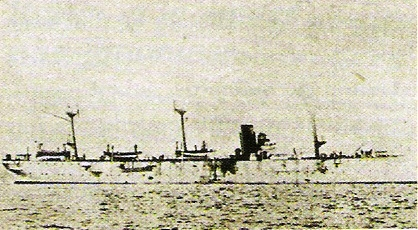
c. 1880s

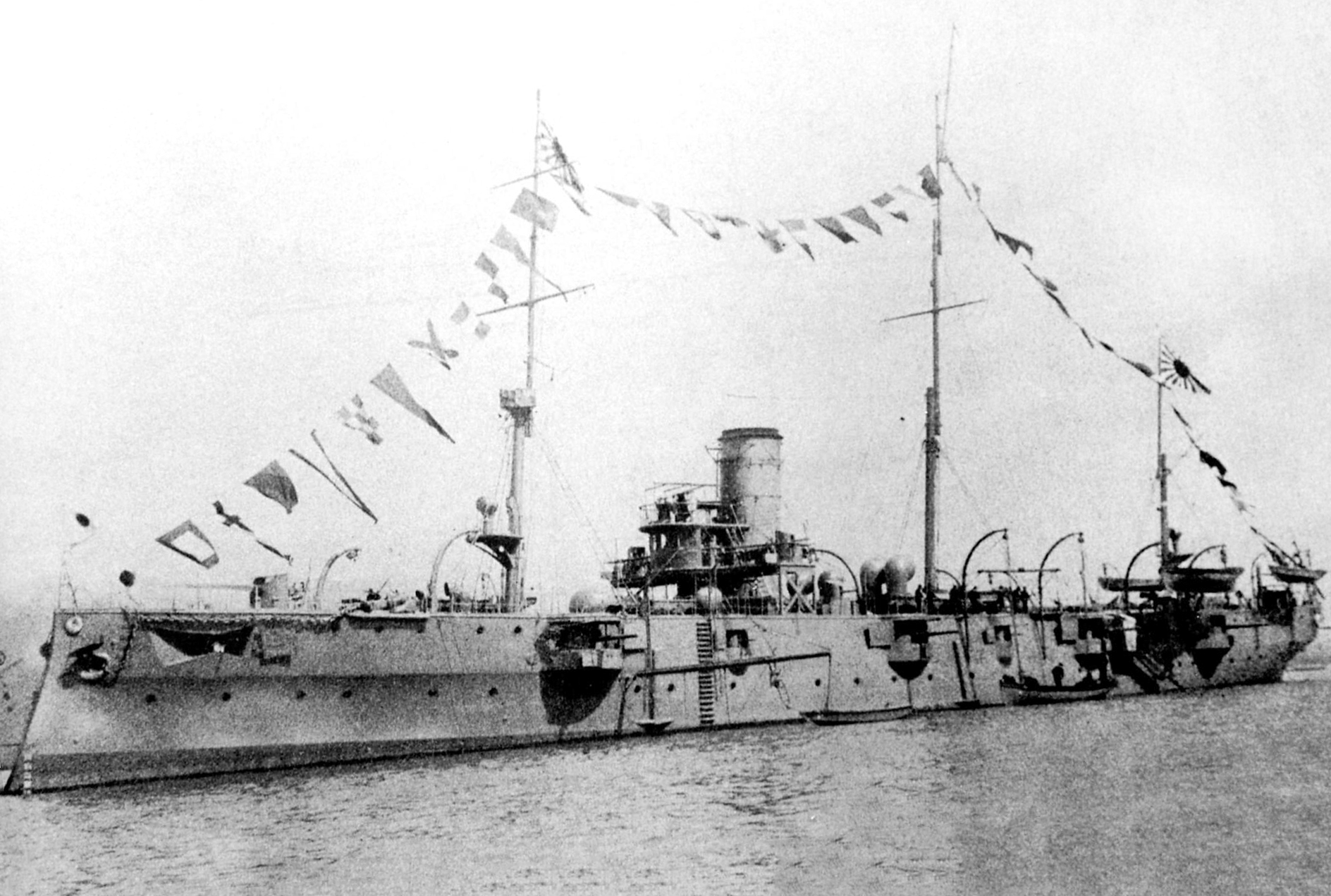
In parade flags after the Russo-Japanese War, 1905–1907
