= Japanese cruiser Yakumo =

Japanese armored cruiser

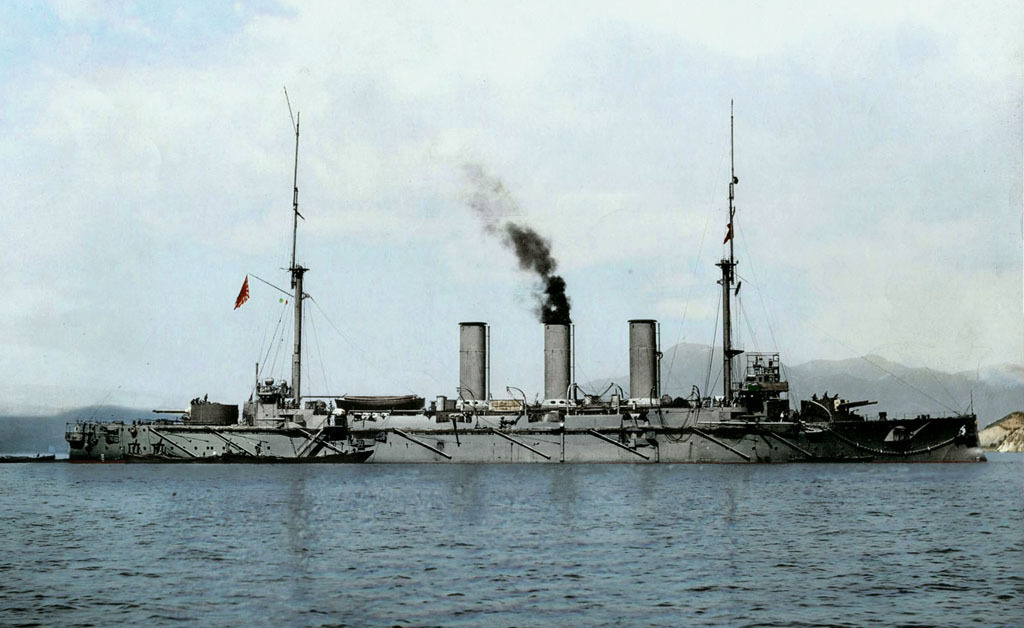
- Yakumo at anchor in Kure, 8 April 1905

Class overview
- Operators: Imperial Japanese Navy
- Preceded by: Izumo class
- Succeeded by: Azuma

History
- Name: Yakumo
- Namesake: A stanza of waka
- Ordered: 1 September 1897
- Builder: AG Vulcan Stettin, Stettin, Germany
- Laid down: 1 September 1897
- Launched: 8 July 1899
- Completed: 20 June 1900
- Reclassified: As 1st class coast-defence ship, 1 September 1921; As training ship, 1 June 1931; As 1st class cruiser, 1 July 1942
- Stricken: 1 October 1945
- Fate: Scrapped, 20 July 1946

General characteristics
- Type: Armored cruiser
- Displacement: 9,646 t (9,494 long tons)
- Length: 132.3 m (434 ft 1 in) (o/a)
- Beam: 19.57 m (64 ft 2 in)
- Draft: 7.21 m (23 ft 8 in)
- Installed power: 15,500 ihp (11,600 kW); 24 Belleville boilers
- Propulsion: 2 Shafts; 2 Vertical triple-expansion steam engines
- Speed: 20 knots (37 km/h; 23 mph)
- Range: 7,000 nmi (13,000 km; 8,100 mi) at 10 knots (19 km/h; 12 mph)
- Complement: 670
- Armament: 2 × twin 20.3 cm/45 Type 41 naval guns; 12 × single QF 6 inch /40 naval guns; 12 × single QF 12-pounder 12 cwt naval guns; 8 × single QF 3-pounder Hotchkiss guns; 5 × single 457 mm (18.0 in) torpedo tubes
- Armor: Waterline belt: 89–178 mm (3.5–7.0 in); Deck: 63 mm (2.5 in); Gun turret: 160 mm (6.3 in); Barbette: 152 mm (6.0 in); Casemate: 51–152 mm (2.0–6.0 in); Conning tower: 356 mm (14.0 in); Bulkhead: 127 mm (5.0 in)

Yakumo (八雲; Eight Clouds) was an armored cruiser (Sōkō jun'yōkan) built for the Imperial Japanese Navy (IJN) in the late 1890s. As Japan lacked the industrial capacity to build such warships itself, the ship was built in Germany. She participated in most of the naval battles of the Russo-Japanese War of 1904–05, and was lightly damaged during the Battle of the Yellow Sea and the Battle of Tsushima. Yakumo saw no combat during World War I and began the first of many training cruises in 1917, although she was not officially reclassified as a training ship until 1931. Her last training cruise was in 1939, but the ship continued to conduct training in home waters throughout the Pacific War. Yakumo became a repatriation transport after the war and was broken up in 1946–47.

== Background and design ==
The 1896 Naval Expansion Plan was made after the First Sino-Japanese War, and included four armored cruisers in addition to four more battleships, all of which had to be ordered from overseas shipyards as Japan lacked the capability to build them itself. Further consideration of the Russian building program caused the IJN to believe that the battleships ordered under the original plan would not be sufficient to counter the Imperial Russian Navy. Budgetary limitations prevented ordering more battleships, and the IJN decided to expand the number of more affordable armored cruisers to be ordered from four to six ships, believing that the recent introduction of tougher Krupp cemented armor would allow them to stand in the line of battle. The revised plan is commonly known as the "Six-Six Fleet". The first four ships were built by Armstrong Whitworth in the United Kingdom, but the last two ships were built in Germany and France. To ensure ammunition compatibility, the IJN required their builders to use the same British guns as the other four ships. In general, the IJN provided only a sketch design and specifications that each builder had to comply with; otherwise each builder was free to build the ships as they saw fit. Unlike most of their contemporaries which were designed for commerce raiding or to defend colonies and trade routes, Yakumo and her half-sisters were intended as fleet scouts and to be employed in the battleline.

== Description ==
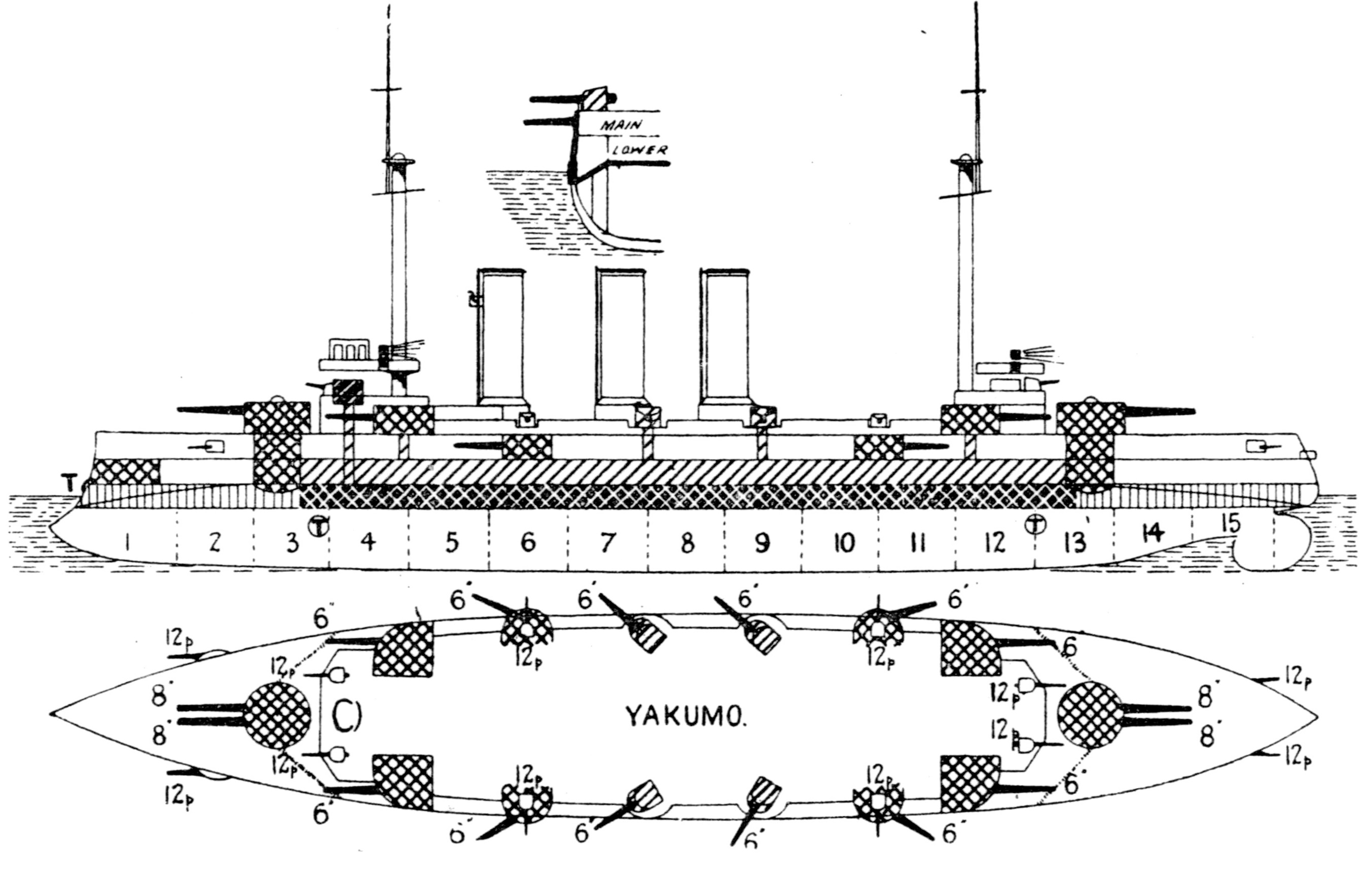
Left elevation and plan of Yakumo from Jane's Fighting Ships 1904

The ship was 132.3 meters (434 ft 1 in) long overall and 124.64 meters (408 ft 11 in) between perpendiculars. She had a beam of 19.57 meters (64 ft 2 in) and had an average draft of 7.21 meters (23 ft 8 in). Yakumo displaced 9,646 metric tons (9,494 long tons) at normal load and 10,288 metric tons (10,126 long tons) at deep load. The ship had a metacentric height of 0.95 meters (3 ft 1 in). She had a double bottom and her hull was subdivided into 247 watertight compartments. Her crew consisted of 670 officers and enlisted men.

Yakumo had two 4-cylinder triple-expansion steam engines, each driving a single propeller shaft. Steam for the engines was provided by 24 Belleville boilers and the engines were rated at a total of 15,500 indicated horsepower (11,600 kW). The ship had a designed speed of 20 knots (37 km/h; 23 mph) and reached 21.005 knots (38.901 km/h; 24.172 mph) during her sea trials from 16,960 ihp (12,650 kW). She carried up to 1,300 metric tons (1,300 long tons; 1,400 short tons) of coal and could steam for 7,000 nautical miles (13,000 km; 8,100 mi) at a speed of 10 knots (19 km/h; 12 mph).

=== Armament ===
The main armament for all of the "Six-Six Fleet" armored cruisers was four Armstrong Whitworth-built 45-caliber eight-inch guns in twin-gun turrets fore and aft of the superstructure. The electrically operated turrets were capable of 130° rotation left and right, and the guns could be elevated to +30° and depressed to −5°. The turret accommodated 65 shells, but could only be reloaded through doors in the turret floor and the ship's deck that allowed the electric winch in the turret to hoist shells up from the shell room deep in the hull. The ship carried a total of 320 eight-inch shells. The guns were manually loaded and had a rate of fire about 1.2 rounds per minute. The 203-millimeter gun fired 113.5-kilogram (250 lb) armor-piercing (AP) projectiles at a muzzle velocity of 760 meters per second (2,500 ft/s) to a range of 18,000 meters (20,000 yd).

The secondary armament consisted of a dozen Elswick Ordnance Company "Pattern Z" quick-firing (QF), 40-caliber, 6-inch guns. Only four of these guns were not mounted in armored casemates on the main and upper decks, and their mounts on the upper deck were protected by gun shields. Their 45.4 kilograms (100 lb) AP shells were fired at a muzzle velocity of 700 meters per second (2,300 ft/s). The guns were provided with 150 rounds each. Yakumo was also equipped with a dozen 40-caliber QF 12-pounder 12-cwt guns (Note: "Cwt" is the abbreviation for hundredweight, 12 cwt referring to the weight of the gun.) and eight QF 2.5-pounder Yamauchi guns as close-range defense against torpedo boats. The former gun fired 76-millimeter (3 in), 5.7-kilogram (12.5 lb) projectiles at a muzzle velocity of 719 meters per second (2,359 ft/s).

Yakumo was equipped with five 457 mm (18.0 in) torpedo tubes, one above water in the bow and four submerged tubes, two on each broadside. The Type 30 torpedo had a 100-kilogram (220 lb) warhead and three range/speed settings: 800 meters (870 yd) at 27 knots (50 km/h; 31 mph), 1,000 meters (1,100 yd) at 23.6 knots (43.7 km/h; 27.2 mph) or 3,000 meters (3,300 yd) at 14.2 knots (26.3 km/h; 16.3 mph).

=== Armor ===
All of the "Six-Six Fleet" armored cruisers used the same armor scheme with some minor differences, one of which was that the four later ships all used Krupp cemented armor. The waterline belt ran the full length of the ship and its thickness varied from 178 millimeters (7.0 in) amidships to 89 millimeters (3.5 in) at the bow and stern. It had a height of 2.13 meters (7 ft 0 in), of which 1.49 meters (4 ft 11 in) was normally underwater. The upper strake of belt armor was 127 millimeters (5.0 in) thick and extended from the upper edge of the waterline belt to the main deck. It extended 61.49 meters (201 ft 9 in) from the forward to the rear barbette. Yakumo had only a single transverse 127 mm armored bulkhead that closed off the forward end of the central armored citadel.

The barbettes, gun turrets and the front of the casemates were all 152 millimeters thick while the sides and rear of the casemates were protected by 51 millimeters (2.0 in) of armor. The deck was 63 millimeters (2.5 in) thick and the armor protecting the conning tower was 356 millimeters (14.0 in) in thickness.

== Construction and career ==
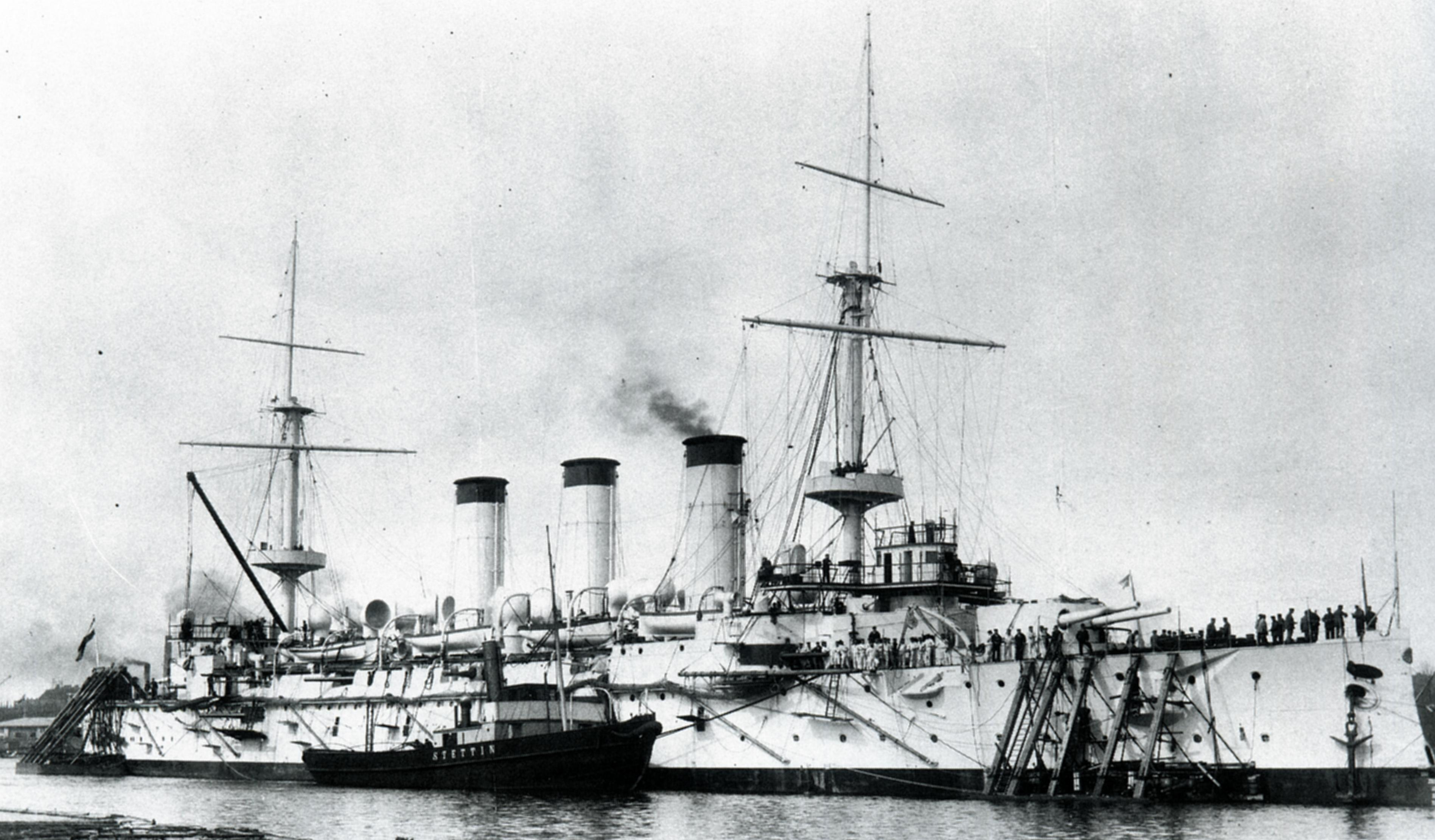
Yakumo at anchor, 1900

Yakumo, named from a stanza of the waka poem by Susanoo in the Japanese mythology, was ordered on 1 September 1897 and laid down a year later by AG Vulcan Stettin in Stettin, Germany. The ship was launched on 8 July 1899 and completed on 20 June 1900. She departed Stettin two days later and arrived in Yokosuka, Japan, on 30 August.

=== Russo-Japanese War ===
At the start of the Russo-Japanese War, Yakumo was assigned to the 2nd Division of the 2nd Fleet. She participated in the Battle of Port Arthur on 9 February 1904, when Vice Admiral Tōgō Heihachirō led the Combined Fleet in an attack on the Russian ships of the Pacific Squadron anchored just outside Port Arthur. Tōgō had expected the surprise night attack by his destroyers to be much more successful than it was, anticipating that the Russians would be badly disorganized and weakened, but they had recovered from their surprise and were ready for his attack. The Japanese ships were spotted by the protected cruiser Boyarin, which was patrolling offshore and alerted the Russians. Tōgō chose to attack the Russian coastal defenses with his main armament and engage the ships with his secondary guns. Splitting his fire proved to be a poor decision as the Japanese eight- and six-inch guns inflicted little damage on the Russian ships, which concentrated all their fire on the Japanese ships with some effect. Although many ships on both sides were hit, Russian casualties numbered some 150, while the Japanese suffered roughly 90 killed and wounded before Tōgō disengaged. Yakumo was not hit during the engagement, although she did hit the protected cruiser Novik one time with an eight-inch shell.

In early March, Vice Admiral Kamimura Hikonojō was tasked to take the reinforced 2nd Division north and make a diversion off Vladivostok. While scouting for Russian ships in the area, the Japanese cruisers bombarded the harbor and defenses of Vladivostok on 6 March to little effect. Upon their return to Japan a few days later, the 2nd Division was ordered to escort the transports ferrying the Imperial Guards Division to Korea and then to join the ships blockading Port Arthur. Yakumo was then transferred to Rear Admiral Dewa Shigetō's 3rd Division. On 23 June, the ship was Dewa's flagship when the Pacific Squadron sortied in an abortive attempt to reach Vladivostok, but the new squadron commander, Rear Admiral Wilgelm Vitgeft, ordered the squadron to return to Port Arthur when it encountered the Japanese battleline shortly before sunset, as he did not wish to engage his numerically superior opponents in a night battle.

==== Battle of the Yellow Sea ====
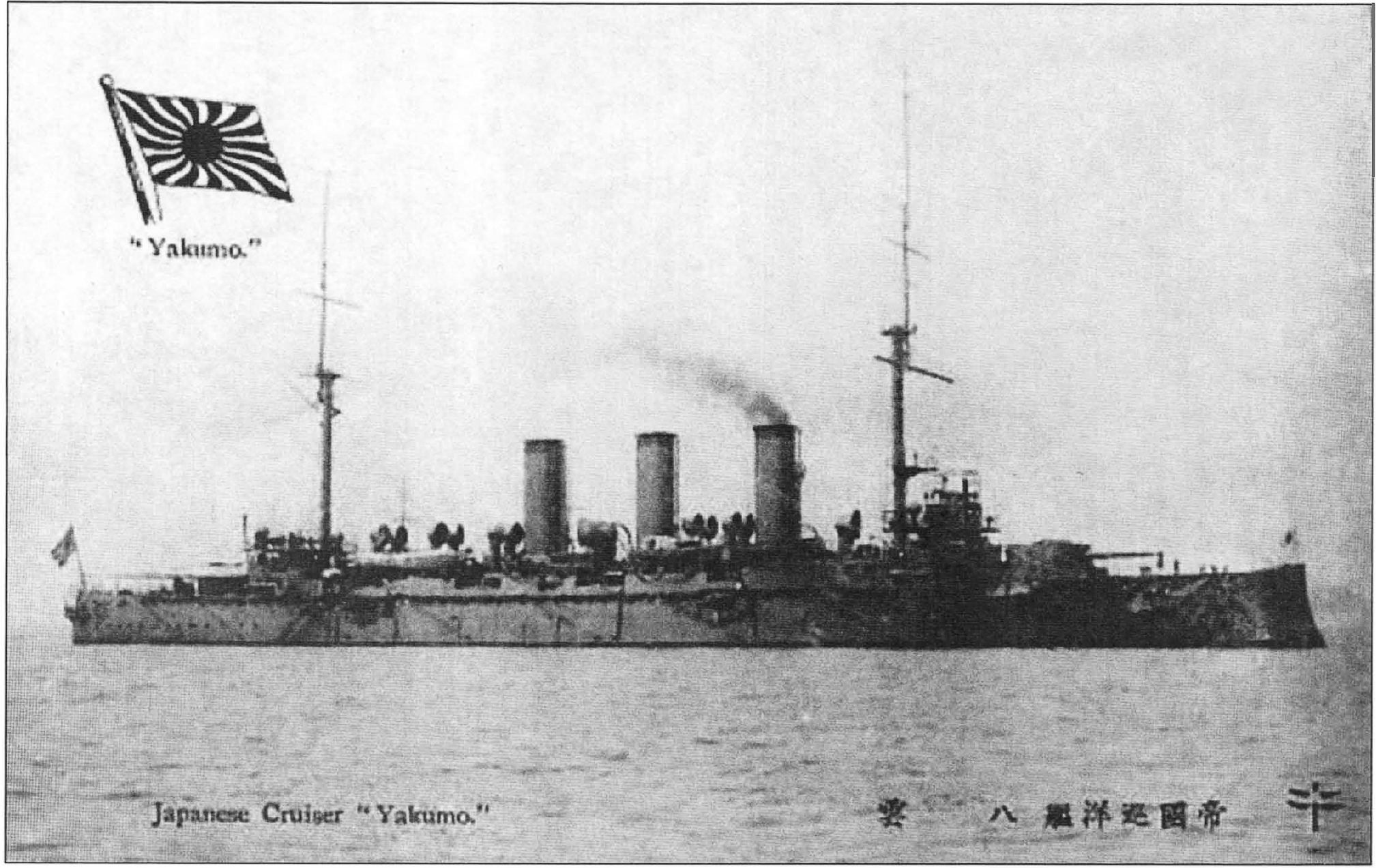
Japanese postcard of Yakumo, circa 1905

On the morning of 10 August 1904, Dewa's cruisers were over 15 nautical miles (28 km; 17 mi) south of Tōgō's 1st Division when the Russians sortied from Port Arthur in another attempt to reach Vladivostok. In the early stages of the battle, Dewa attempted to engage the Russian cruisers trailing the battleships in accordance with Tōgō's standing orders, but was rebuffed by fire from the battleships. As Dewa closed with the Russians later in the afternoon in another attempt to attack the Russian cruisers, a 12-inch (305 mm) shell struck Yakumo amidships at 15:40, killing 12 and wounding 11. The range at this time exceeded 8 nautical miles (15 km; 9.2 mi), beyond the range of any gun in his squadron, so Dewa ordered his ships to disengage. By 17:45, Yakumo had maneuvered to about 8,000 or 9,000 meters (8,700 or 9,800 yd) from the damaged Russian battleship Poltava and opened fire. Yakumo continued to close until the Russian squadron was thrown into confusion by the death of Vitgeft around 18:40.

The 3rd Division then followed Tōgō's ships as they circled the Russian ships while they sorted themselves out, now firing at the Russian cruisers with little effect, until Tōgō ordered Dewa to attack the Russian destroyers at about 19:44. Dewa cancelled that last order and turned south around 20:00 in pursuit of several Russian cruisers that were fleeing to the south, in an attempt to intercept them before they reached the isolated flotillas of destroyers and torpedo boats. The Russian ships were engaged by other Japanese cruisers before they could reach the small ships, and Dewa broke off the pursuit around 20:25 as light was fading. He continued south-eastwards overnight and spotted one cruiser and two destroyers, but was unable to catch any of them. On 14 August, Yakumo and the 3rd Division was ordered to Qingdao to confirm that the Germans had indeed interned the battleship Tsesarevich and three destroyers that had taken shelter there after the battle. After their return, they were reassigned to the blockade of Port Arthur.

In mid-September, Yakumo was transferred back to Kamimura's 2nd Division, which was defending the Strait of Tsushima, although she began a refit at the end of the month. The ship returned to Dewa on 15 November and he transferred his flag back to her. On 13 December, the ship attempted to rescue survivors of the Takasago after she had struck a mine, but found no one still living. Yakumo was sent to Sasebo Naval Arsenal for another refit five days later. On 1 February 1905, the ship was ordered to join Rear Admiral Shimamura Hayao's 2nd Division blockading Vladivostok, although this only lasted for a few weeks as she was ordered to Kure Naval Arsenal for a final refit in mid-February before the anticipated battle with the Russian ships sent from the Baltic Fleet.

==== Battle of Tsushima ====
As the Russian 2nd and 3rd Pacific Squadrons approached Japan on 27 May, having sailed from the Baltic Sea, Yakumo was assigned to Kamimura's 2nd Division of the 2nd Fleet. The Russians were spotted by patrolling Japanese ships early that morning, but visibility was limited and radio reception poor. The preliminary reports were enough to cause Tōgō to order his ships to put to sea and the 2nd Division spotted the Russian ships under the command of Vice Admiral Zinovy Rozhestvensky at around 11:30. Kamimura closed to about a range of 8000 meters before sheering off under fire to join Tōgō's battleships. Yakumo was fourth of six when Tōgō opened fire on the 2nd Pacific Squadron at 14:10 and, like most of the ships in the division, engaged the battleship Oslyabya which was forced to fall out of formation at 14:50 and sank 20 minutes later. By this time the Russian formation was in disorder and the battleship Knyaz Suvorov suddenly appeared out of the mist at 15:35 at a range of about 2,000 meters (6,600 ft). All of Kamimura's ships engaged her for five minutes or so, with Yakumo and the armored cruiser Azuma also firing torpedoes at the Russian ship without effect.

After 17:30 Kamimura led his division in a fruitless pursuit of some of the Russian cruisers, leaving Tōgō's battleships to their own devices. He abandoned his chase around 18:03 and turned northwards to rejoin Tōgō. His ships spotted the rear of the Russian battleline around 18:30 and opened fire when the range closed to 8000–9000 meters. Nothing is known of any effect on the Russians, and they ceased fire by 19:30 and rejoined Tōgō at 20:08 as night was falling. The surviving Russian ships were spotted the next morning and the Japanese ships opened fire around 10:30, staying beyond the range at which the Russian ships could effectively reply. Rear Admiral Nikolai Nebogatov therefore decided to surrender his ships, as he could neither return fire nor close the range.

In the meantime, the coast defense ship Admiral Ushakov had fallen well behind Nebogatov's ships and was spotted by the protected cruiser Chiyoda early in the morning, but the Japanese were more intent on locating the main body of the Russian fleet than attacking a single isolated ship. Admiral Ushakov was then spotted at 14:10, well after Nebogatov's surrender, by Shimamura who received permission to pursue her with his flagship, the armored cruiser Iwate, and Yakumo. They caught up with the Russian ship at 17:00 and demanded her surrender. Admiral Ushakov attempted to close the range to bring the Japanese cruisers within range of her guns, but they were fast enough to keep the range open and the Russian ship never hit either one. After about half an hour, Admiral Ushakov was listing heavily enough that her guns could not elevate enough to bear, and her commander ordered his crew to abandon ship and the scuttling charges detonated. The ship sank in three minutes and 12 officers and 327 crewmen were rescued by the Japanese. Between them, Yakumo and Iwate fired 89 eight- and 278 six-inch shells during the engagement. Over the course of the entire battle, Yakumo was struck by a single twelve-inch shell and six others, of which three or four were six inches in size. They inflicted only minor damage.

On 14 June, Yakumo was assigned as the flagship of Vice Admiral Kataoka Shichirō, commander of the 3rd Fleet, as part of the operation to capture the island of Sakhalin in July.

=== World War I ===
In November 1914, Yakumo was deployed to Singapore preparatory to searching for the German commerce raider Emden, but the ship was sunk before the mission began. Yakumo served as the flagship of Destroyer Squadron (Suiraisentai) 2 from 13 December 1915 to 1 December 1916 and then of Suiraisentai 1 from 1 to 12 December. In February 1917, the ship began patrolling the South Pacific and Indian Oceans, searching for German commerce raiders. She began the first of her many training cruises on 5 April when she departed for North America and Hawaii, before arriving back in Japan on 17 August. In October 1918, Kichisaburō Nomura was appointed captain of Yakumo for two months, only one of which he spent on board the vessel, as a political appointment to qualify Nomura for flag rank.

=== Interwar years ===
On 1 September 1921, Yakumo was re-designated as a 1st class coast-defense ship and used primarily for training duties in long-distance oceanic navigation and officer training for cadets in the Imperial Japanese Navy Academy. In this capacity, she participated in 13 more voyages in the 1920s and 1930s to Europe, North and South America, and the South Pacific, including a circumnavigation of the globe from August 1921 to April 1922, in company with the armored cruiser Izumo. Two of the naval cadets that participated in this cruise were Princes Kuni Asaakira and Kachō Hirotada.

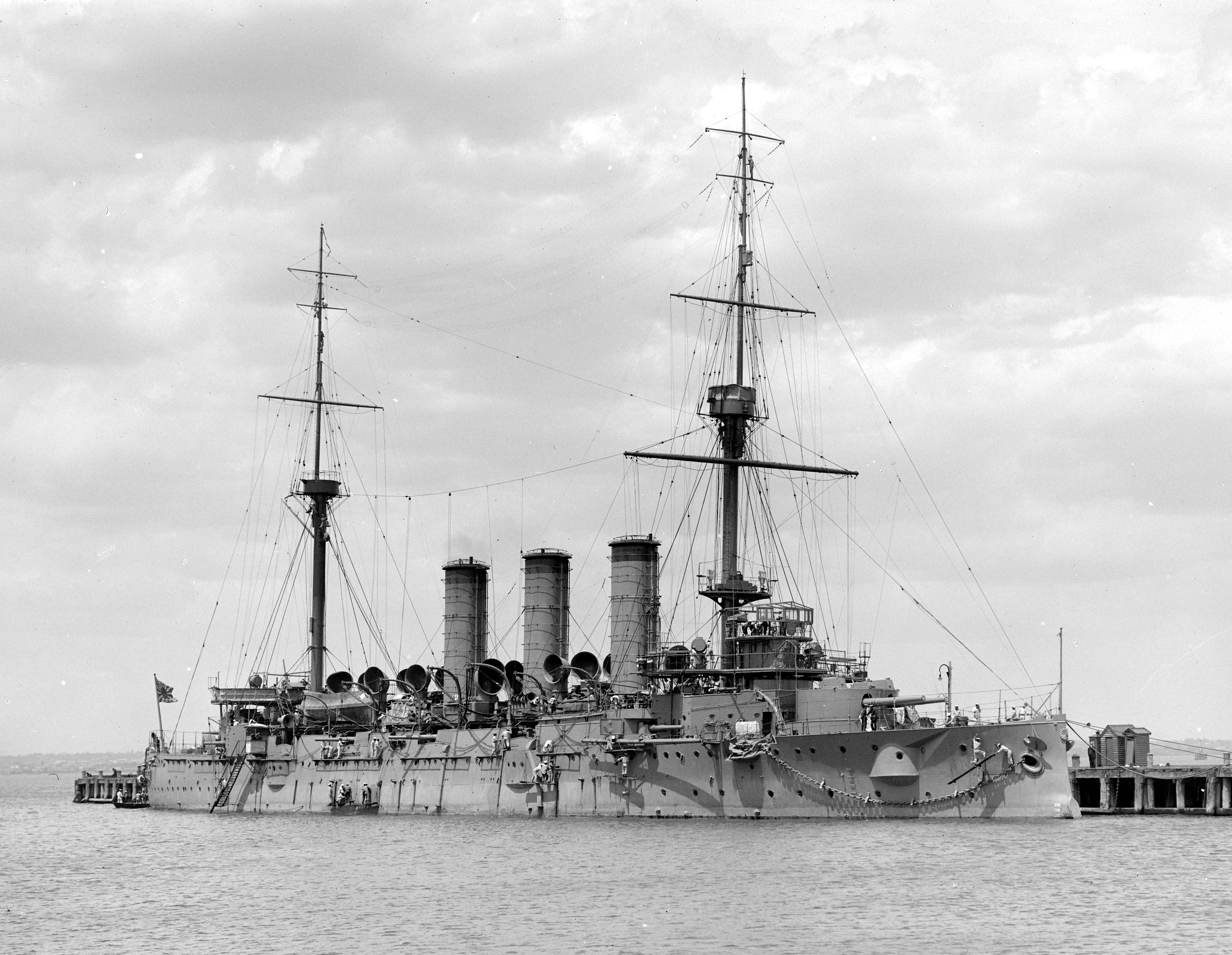
Yakumo at anchor in Australia during her 1928 cadet cruise

In 1924, four of Yakumo's 12-pounder guns were removed, as were all of her QF 2.5-pounder guns, and a single 8 cm/40 3rd Year Type anti-aircraft gun was added. In addition three of her torpedo tubes were removed. Three years later, her boilers were replaced by six Yarrow boilers, formerly from the battleship Haruna, which reduced her power to 7,000 ihp (5,200 kW) and maximum speed to 16 knots (30 km/h; 18 mph). These boilers used a mix of coal and fuel oil, and the ship now carried a total of 1,210 metric tons (1,190 long tons) of coal and 306 metric tons (301 long tons) of oil.

During a visit to Qingdao in 1932, Yakumo and Izumo had to land marines on 13 January to quell a riot by Japanese residents there. The following year, the ship was reclassified as a training ship. On 6 November 1936, between the islands of Saipan and Truk, an accidental explosion in her front magazine killed four crewmen and flooded her front food locker. Repairs were made underway and Yakumo arrived home two weeks later. A month after her return, in December 1936, Captain Matome Ugaki assumed command of Yakumo until he took command of the battleship Hyūga the next year. Her last training cruise ended on 20 November 1939.

=== World War II ===
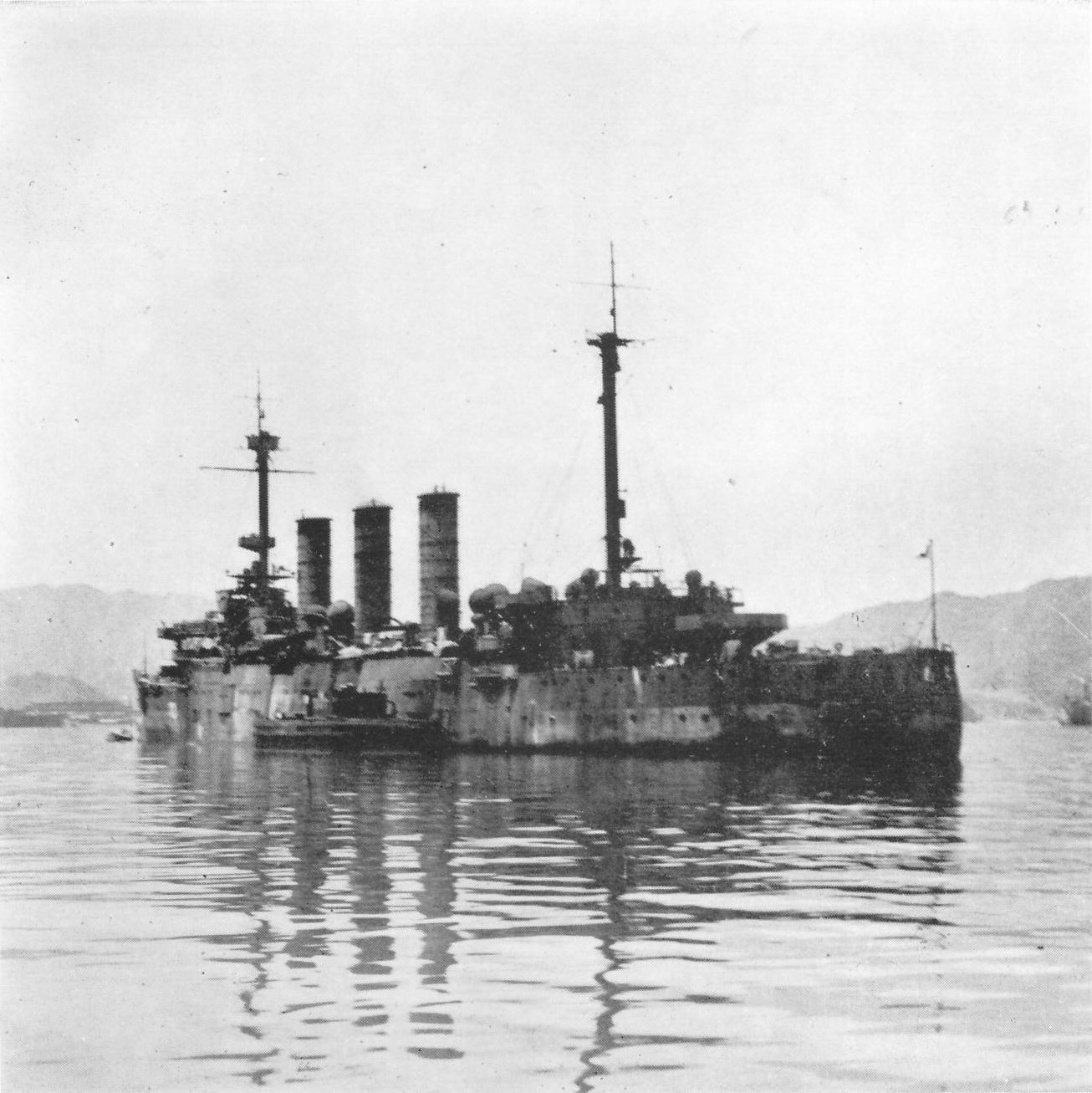
Yakumo at anchor, 1946

After the start of the Pacific War, Yakumo was reclassified as a 1st class cruiser on 1 July 1942, and her eight-inch guns were replaced by four 12.7 cm (5.0 in) Type 89 dual-purpose guns in two twin mounts. In addition her light anti-aircraft armament was augmented. However, Yakumo remained within the confines of the Seto Inland Sea throughout the war as she was assigned to training duties, and was not used in any combat operations. On 24 July 1945, US Task Force 38 launched a massive attack on Kure to destroy any and all remaining units of the Japanese Navy. Yakumo was damaged and re-designated as a special transport ship. Yakumo began service as a repatriation transport on 7 December 1945. Her mission was to return troops and civilians to the home islands from Japan's former overseas possessions, primarily from Taiwan and mainland China. She completed her last voyage in June 1946, repatriating a total of 9,010 people. Yakumo arrived at the Maizuru shipyard of Hitachi Shipbuilding & Engineering on 20 July 1946 to begin demolition that lasted until 1 April 1947.
