= Japanese cruiser Chitose =

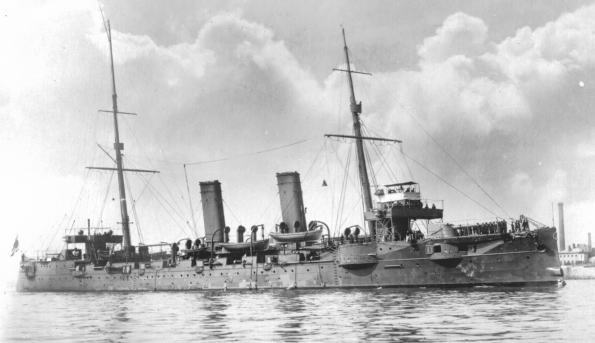
- Japanese cruiser Chitose

History

Empire of Japan
- Name: Chitose
- Ordered: 1896 Fiscal Year
- Builder: Union Iron Works, United States
- Laid down: 16 May 1897
- Launched: 22 January 1898
- Completed: 1 March 1899
- Commissioned: March 1899
- Decommissioned: 1 April 1928
- Stricken: 1 April 1928
- Fate: Sunk as target, 19 July 1931

General characteristics
- Class & type: Kasagi-class cruiser
- Displacement: 4,836 t (4,760 long tons)
- Length: 115.3 m (378 ft 3 in) w/l
- Beam: 15 m (49 ft 3 in)
- Draft: 5.4 m (17 ft 9 in)
- Installed power: 11,600 kW (15,600 hp)
- Propulsion: 2 × VTE; 12 × boilers; 2 × shafts
- Speed: 22.5 kn (41.7 km/h; 25.9 mph)
- Range: 4,000 nmi (7,400 km; 4,600 mi) at 10 kn (19 km/h; 12 mph)
- Complement: 405
- Armament: 2 × 20.3 cm/45 Type 41 naval guns; 10 × QF 4.7 inch Gun Mk I–IV guns; 12 × QF 12-pounder 12 cwt naval guns; 6 × QF 3-pounder Hotchkiss guns; 4 × 356 mm (14.0 in) torpedo tubes
- Armor: Deck: 112 mm (4.4 in) (slope), 62 mm (2.4 in) (flat); Gun shield: 203 mm (8 in) (front), 62 mm (2.4 in) (sides); Conning tower: 115 mm (4.5 in)

Chitose (千歳) was a Kasagi-class protected cruiser of the Imperial Japanese Navy. It was the sister ship to Kasagi.

== Background ==
Chitose was ordered as part of the 1896 Emergency Fleet Replenishment Budget, funded by the war indemnity received from the Empire of China as part of the settlement of the Treaty of Shimonoseki ending the First Sino-Japanese War.

== Design ==
Chitose was designed and built in San Francisco in the United States by the Union Iron Works. The vessel was the second major capital warship to be ordered by the Imperial Japanese Navy from an American shipbuilder, and the last to be ordered from an overseas shipyard. The cruiser's specifications were very similar to that of Takasago, but with slightly larger displacement and overall dimensions, but with identical gun armament (and without the bow torpedo tubes). However, internally the ships were very different, with Chitose having 130 watertight compartments, compared with 109 in Takasago.

== Service record ==
A short historical film clip of the launch. (1898)

Chitose's launch was filmed by Thomas Edison. The ship was christened by May Budd, niece of California governor James Budd, with a bottle of California wine. Gladys Sullivan, niece of San Francisco mayor James D. Phelan, pressed the button that sent the ship down the slipway. To symbolize the peacekeeping role of the warship, 100 doves were released as the vessel was launched. Japanese Consul General Segawa explained in a speech at the following luncheon that the name "Chitose" meant "a thousand years of peace" in Japanese, and that he hoped that the ship would fulfill that wish.

Chitose arrived at Yokosuka Naval District on 30 April 1899.

=== Russo-Japanese War ===
During the Russo-Japanese War, Chitose was active in the Battle of Port Arthur as flagship for Admiral Dewa Shigeto. On 9 February 1904, she was part of the 3rd Cruiser Squadron which engaged the Russian fleet at the entrance to Port Arthur, attacking the cruisers Askold and Novik, and sinking a Russian destroyer on 25 February. During the Battle of the Yellow Sea on 10 August, Chitose participated in the unsuccessful pursuit of the cruisers Askold and Novik, and continued to pursue Novik to Hokkaido together with Tsushima, sinking the Russian cruiser at the Battle of Korsakov on 21 August.

During the final decisive Battle of Tsushima, Chitose, together with the other cruisers in the 3rd Division, engaged the Russian cruisers Oleg, Aurora, and Zhemchug. When Kasagi was damaged in the battle, Admiral Dewa transferred his flag to Chitose. The following day, Chitose sank a Russian destroyer, and successfully pursued the cruiser Izumrud. Following the Battle of Tsushima, Chitose was assigned to cover the landings of Japanese reinforcements in northern Korea. She returned to Maizuru Naval Arsenal for repairs at the end of July 1905.

=== World War I ===
From 1 April-16 November 1907, Chitose made a round-the-world voyage together with the armoured cruiser Tsukuba, first stopping in the United States to attend the Jamestown Exposition of 1907, the 300th anniversary celebrations of the founding of the Jamestown Colony, and continuing onwards to Europe. She underwent an extensive overhaul in 1910, with her cylindrical locomotive-style boilers replaced by more reliable Miyabara boilers.

During World War I, Chitose was assigned to the IJN 2nd Fleet, and participated in patrols of the sea lanes between Singapore and Borneo against German commerce raiders and U-boats, as part of Japan's contribution to the Allied war effort under the Anglo-Japanese Alliance.

The ship was downgraded to a 2nd class coastal defense vessel on 1 September 1921 and was partially disarmed. Chitose was deemed obsolete on 1 April 1928 and removed from the navy list. Re-designated Haikan No. 1, she was sunk on 19 July 1931 off Kōchi, Shikoku as a target for dive bombers during a live fire exercise.
