= Japanese ship Kasagi =

At least two warships of Japan have borne the name Kasagi:

- Japanese cruiser Kasagi a Kasagi-class cruiser launched in 1898 and wrecked in 1916
- Japanese aircraft carrier Kasagi an Unryū-class aircraft carrier launched in 1944 but never completed. She was scrapped in 1946
