= Japanese cruiser Kasagi =

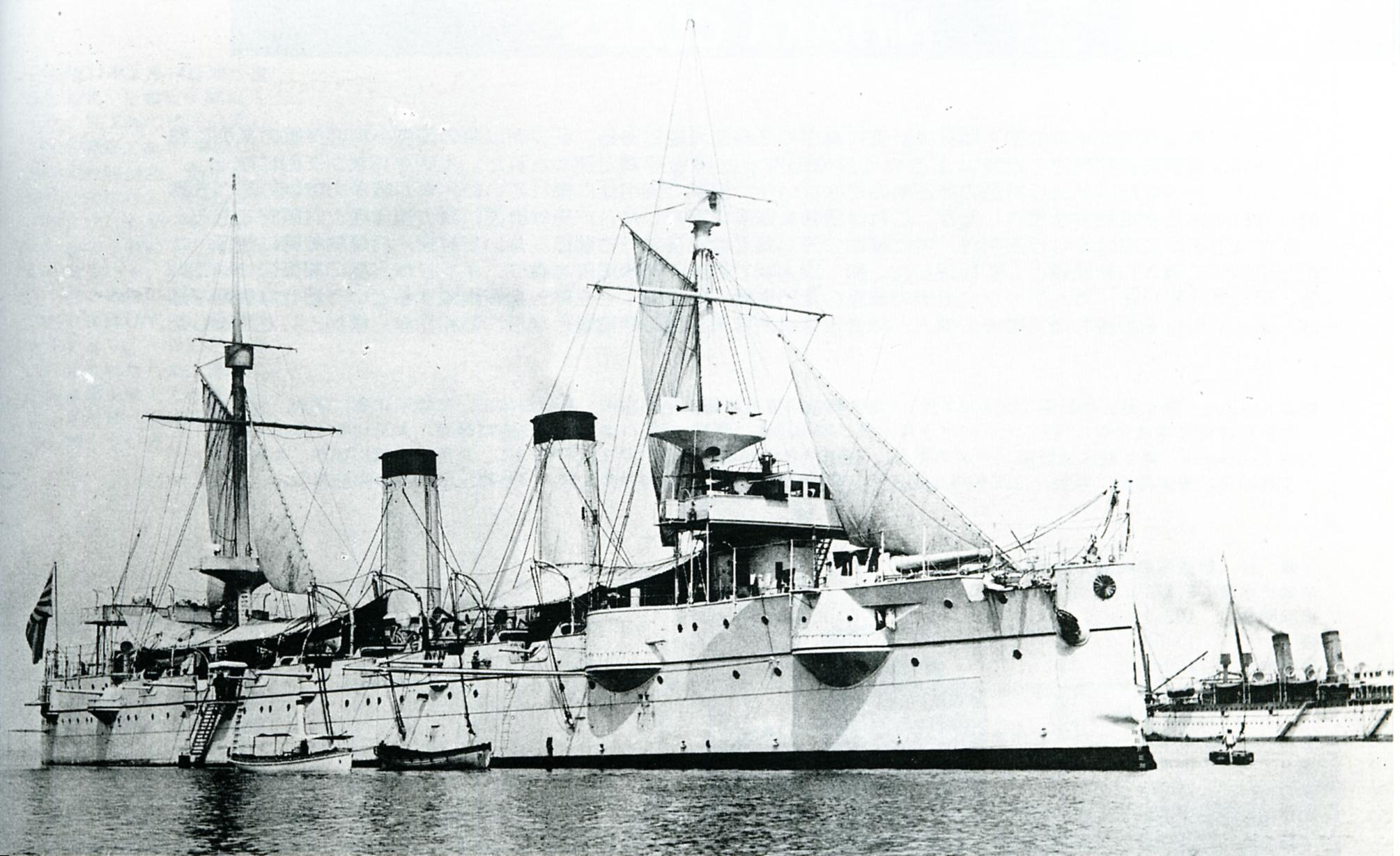
- Japanese cruiser Kasagi at Kobe in 1898

History

Empire of Japan
- Name: Kasagi
- Ordered: 1896 Fiscal Year
- Builder: William Cramp & Sons, Philadelphia, USA
- Yard number: 291
- Laid down: 13 February 1897
- Launched: 20 January 1898
- Completed: 24 October 1898
- Out of service: 10 August 1916
- Stricken: 5 November 1916
- Fate: Wrecked in the Tsugaru Strait 10 August 1916

General characteristics
- Class & type: Kasagi-class cruiser
- Displacement: 4,979 t (4,900 long tons)
- Length: 114.1 m (374 ft 4 in) w/l
- Beam: 14.9 m (48 ft 11 in)
- Draft: 5.41 m (17 ft 9 in)
- Installed power: 11,600 kW (15,600 hp)
- Propulsion: 2 × vertical triple expansion reciprocating engines; 12 × boilers; 2 × screws
- Speed: 22.5 kn (41.7 km/h; 25.9 mph)
- Range: 4,000 nmi (7,400 km; 4,600 mi) at 10 kn (19 km/h; 12 mph)
- Complement: 405
- Armament: 2 × 20.3 cm (8 in)/45 Type 41 naval guns; 10 × 12 cm (4.7 in)/40 Type 41 naval guns; 12 × QF 12 pounder 12 cwt naval guns; 6 × QF 3 pounder Hotchkiss guns; 5 × 356 mm (14.0 in) torpedo tubes
- Armor: Deck: 112 mm (4.4 in) (slope), 62 mm (2.4 in) (flat); Gun shield: 114.3 mm (4.50 in) (front), 62 mm (2.4 in) (sides); Conning Tower: 115 mm (4.5 in)

Kasagi (笠置) was the lead ship in the Kasagi-class protected cruisers in the Imperial Japanese Navy. The vessel was the sister ship to the Chitose. She was named after Mount Kasagi, a holy mountain outside Kyoto.

== Background ==
Kasagi was ordered as part of the 1896 Emergency Fleet Replenishment Budget, funded by the war indemnity received from the Empire of China as part of the settlement of the Treaty of Shimonoseki ending the First Sino-Japanese War.

== Design ==
Kasagi was designed and built in Philadelphia, in the United States by William Cramp & Sons (who had also built the cruiser Varyag for the Imperial Russian Navy). Kasagi was the first major capital warship to be ordered by the Imperial Japanese Navy from an American shipbuilder. Her specifications were very similar to that of the British-built Takasago, but with slightly larger displacement and overall dimensions, but with identical gun armament (and without the bow torpedo tubes). However, internally the ships were very different, with Kasagi having 142 watertight compartments, compared with 109 in Takasago.

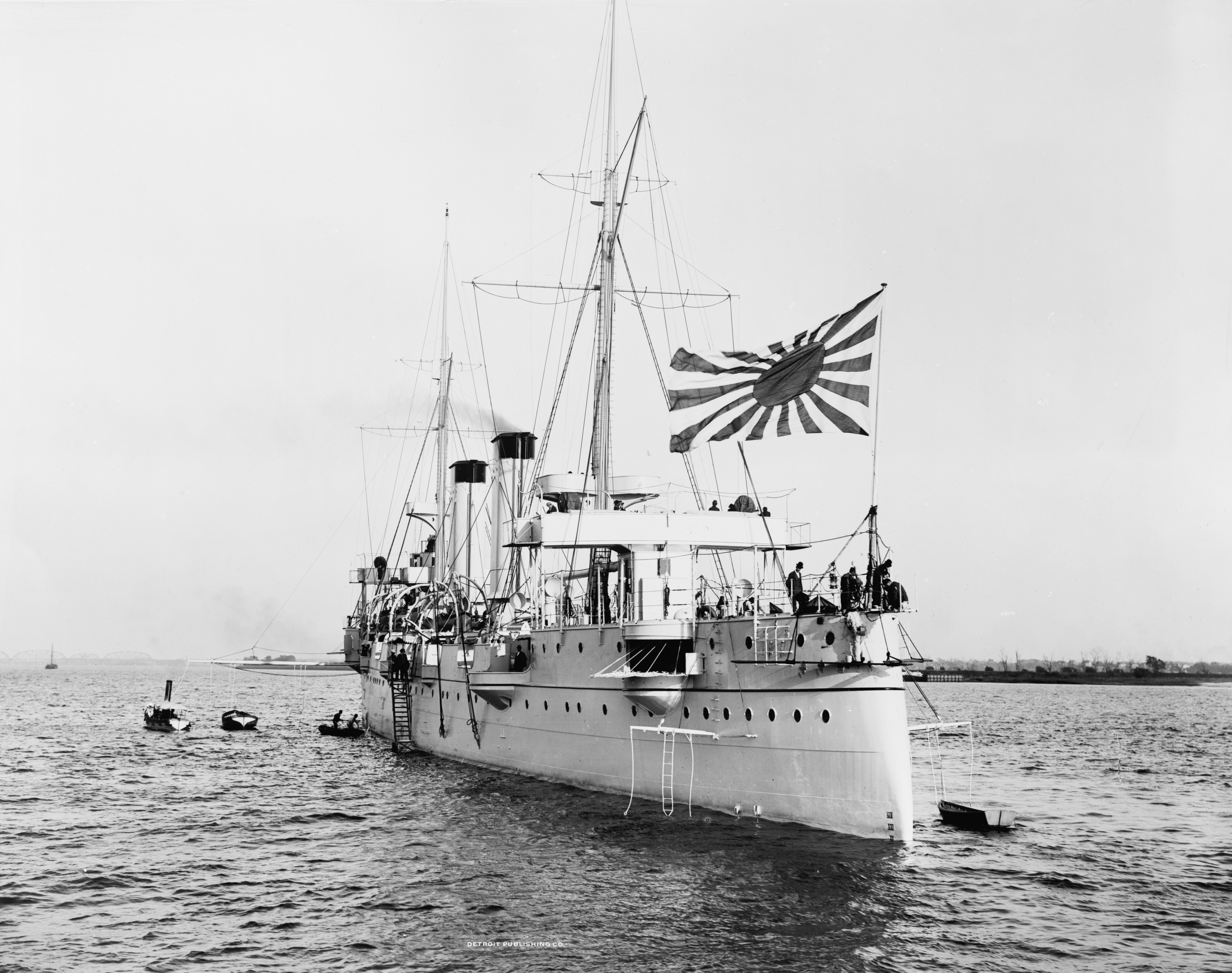
Kasagi without guns, before sailing to the UK

== Service record ==
The day after she was formally commissioned, the yet-unarmed Kasagi participated in a naval review at Philadelphia celebrating the end of the Spanish–American War. For her shakedown cruise in November 1898, Kasagi was sailed from Philadelphia directly to Great Britain, where her armament was installed. She arrived at Yokosuka Naval District on 16 May 1899. Future admiral Yamashita Gentarō served as executive officer on Kasagi between 1899 and 1900.

In April 1900, while participating in maneuvers in Kagoshima Bay, Kasagi collided in a fog bank with a commercial steamer, forcing the steamer to beach itself to avoid sinking. Damage to Kasagi did not prevent her from completing the maneuvers. The first overseas deployment of Kasagi was in 1900, to support Japanese naval landing forces which occupied the port city of Tianjin in northern China during the Boxer Rebellion, as part of the Japanese contribution to the Eight-Nation Alliance. From her crew, 52 sailors were dispatched on a landing operation.

Kasagi participated in maneuvers in July 1901, simulating an attack by foreign powers on the port of Sasebo. The following month, she accompanied Iwate on a good-will visit to the Russian port of Vladivostok.

=== Russo-Japanese War ===
Kasagi in 1899

During the Russo-Japanese War, Kasagi was active from its base in Korea in the Battle of Port Arthur. On 9 February 1904, she was part of the 3rd Cruiser Squadron under the overall command of Admiral Dewa Shigetō which engaged the Russian fleet at the entrance to Port Arthur, taking some minor damage. In March, Kasagi and Yoshino were reassigned to assist Admiral Kamimura Hikonojō's forces in the bombardment of Vladivostok. On 14 May, Kasagi assisted in efforts to save the crew of the battleship Hatsuse after that ship struck a naval mine, rescuing 134 survivors, and firing on Russian destroyers.

During the Battle of the Yellow Sea on 10 August, Kasagi engaged the Poltava, and participated in the unsuccessful pursuit of the cruisers Askold and Novik.

At the crucial final Battle of Tsushima, Kasagi was the flagship of the 3rd Division under Admiral Dewa and was commanded by Captain Yamaya Tanin. Kasagi made the first shot of the battle by firing on the battleship Oryol. At around 14:30, together with the other cruisers in the 3rd Division, she engaged the Russian cruisers Oleg, Aurora, and Zhemchug. However, Kasagi was hit below the waterline by a Russian shell, which flooded a boiler room and coal bunker, killing one crewman and injuring nine others, and was forced to withdraw from combat to address the damage.

=== Final years ===
In October 1908, Kasagi participated in the first large-scale post-war fleet maneuvers of the Imperial Japanese Navy. From 1910, she was assigned training duties, and made a long-distance navigational training voyage from 16 October 1910 to 6 March 1911 to Hawaii. She underwent extensive overhaul in 1912, with her cylindrical boilers replaced by more reliable Miyabara boilers.

During World War I, Kasagi was assigned to the Japanese 1st Fleet, but was still primarily used as a training vessel.

Kasagi ran aground in heavy weather in the Tsugaru Strait between Honshū and Hokkaidō en route to Akita on 20 July 1916, suffering a major hull breach in the vicinity of her second smoke stack. After salvage of some equipment, she sank on 10 August and was formally written off the navy list on 5 November of the same year.
