= Kasagi-class cruiser =

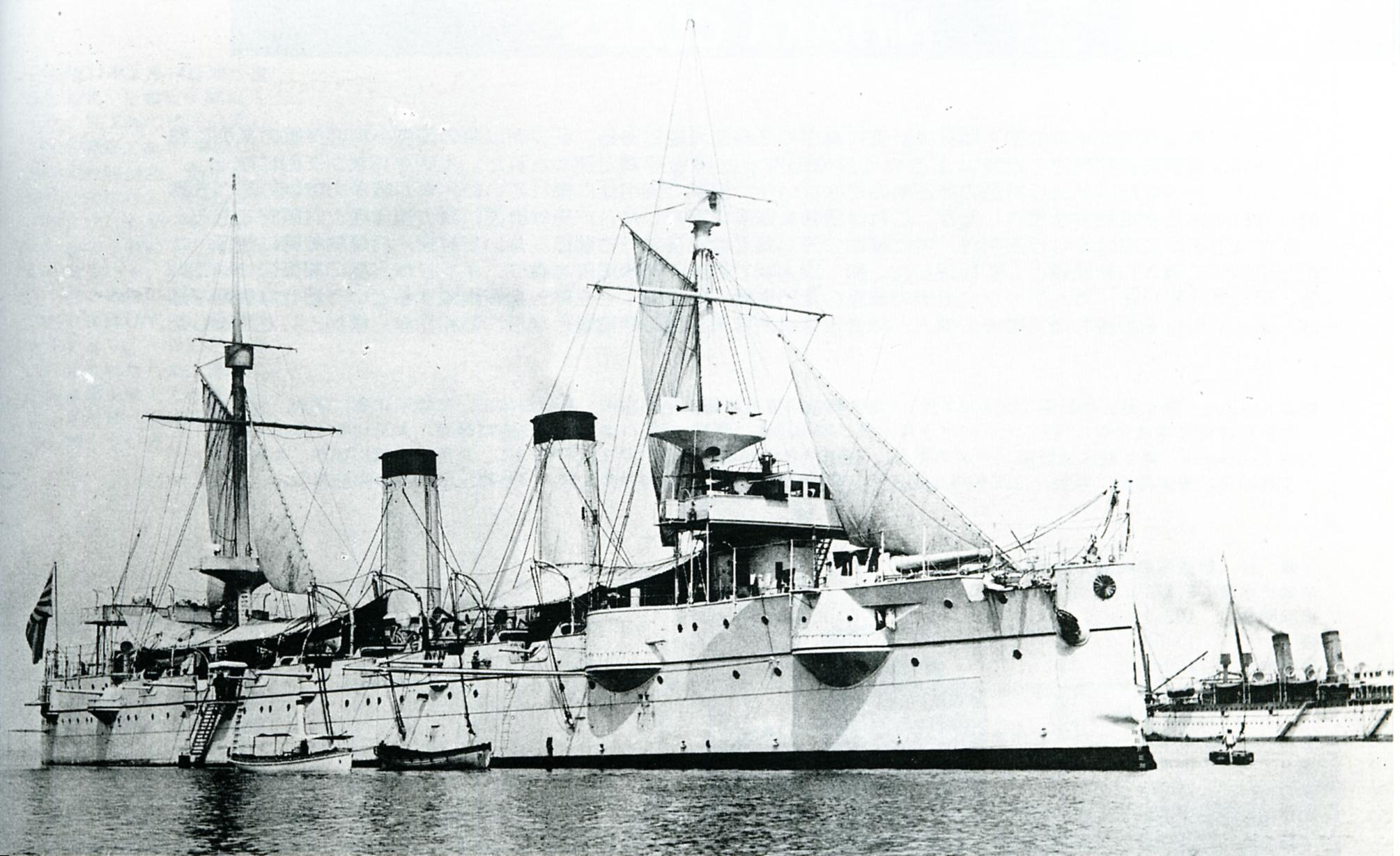
- Kasagi at Kobe, 1898

Class overview
- Name: Kasagi class
- Builders: William Cramp & Sons, Philadelphia (Kasagi); Union Iron Works, San Francisco (Chitose)
- Operators: Imperial Japanese Navy
- In commission: 1897–1927
- Completed: 2
- Lost: 1
- Retired: 1

General characteristics
- Type: Protected cruiser
- Displacement: 4,979 long tons (5,059 t)
- Length: 114.1 m (374 ft 4 in) w/l
- Beam: 14.9 m (48 ft 11 in)
- Draft: 5.41 m (17 ft 9 in)
- Installed power: 15,000 hp (11,000 kW)
- Propulsion: 2 × VTE; 12 × boilers; 2 × shafts
- Speed: 22.5 kn (41.7 km/h; 25.9 mph)
- Range: 4,000 nmi (7,400 km; 4,600 mi) at 10 kn (19 km/h; 12 mph)
- Complement: 405
- Armament: 2 × 20.3 cm/45 Type 41 naval guns; 10 × QF 4.7 inch Gun Mk I–IV guns; 12 × QF 12-pounder 12 cwt naval guns; 6 × QF 3-pounder Hotchkiss guns; 5 × 356 mm (14.0 in) torpedo tubes
- Armor: Deck: 112 mm (4.4 in) (slope), 62 mm (2.4 in) (flat); Gun shield: 203 mm (8.0 in) (front), 62 mm (2.4 in) (sides); Conning tower: 115 mm (4.5 in)

The Kasagi-class cruiser (笠置型巡洋艦, Kasagi-gata jun'yōkan) was a class of two protected cruisers of the Imperial Japanese Navy built in the United States at the end of the 19th century.

== Background ==
The Kasagi-class cruisers were ordered under the 1896 Emergency Fleet Replenishment Budget, funded by the war indemnity received from the Empire of China as part of the settlement of the Treaty of Shimonoseki ending the First Sino-Japanese War. Unlike previous vessels, which had been acquired from European shipyards, the Japanese government turned this time to the United States.

== Design ==
The Kasagi-class cruisers were externally based on the design of the British built cruiser Takasago – a typical Elswick cruiser design, with a steel hull, divided into waterproof compartments, a low forecastle, two smokestacks, and two masts, but with slightly larger displacement and overall dimensions. However, internally the arrangement of the structure was quite different. The prow was reinforced for ramming. The power plant was a triple expansion reciprocating steam engine with four cylindrical boilers, driving two screws. Armament consisted of two 20.3 cm/45 Type 41 naval guns in the main battery and ten QF 4.7-inch guns and twelve QF 12-pounder 12 cwt naval guns mounted on the sides. In addition, each ship was equipped with six QF 3-pounder Hotchkiss guns and four 356 mm (14.0 in) torpedo tubes.

== Ships in class ==
=== Kasagi ===
Kasagi was built by William Cramp & Sons at Philadelphia. She was laid down on 13 February 1897 and launched on 20 January 1898. She served in the Boxer Rebellion and the Russo-Japanese War and took part in the Battle of the Yellow Sea and again at the Battle of Tsushima. She ran aground in heavy weather in the Tsugaru Strait between Honshū and Hokkaidō en route to Akita on 20 July 1916, suffering a major hull breach and sank on 10 August of the same year.

=== Chitose ===
Chitose was built by the Union Iron Works in San Francisco. She laid down on 16 May 1897 and was launched on 23 January 1898. She served in the Russo-Japanese War and in World War I. Downgraded to a 2nd Class Coastal Defense Vessel on 1 September 1921, and partially disarmed she was removed from the navy list on 1 April 1928 and sunk as a target on 19 July 1931.
