= Japanese cruiser Azuma =

Japanese armored cruiser

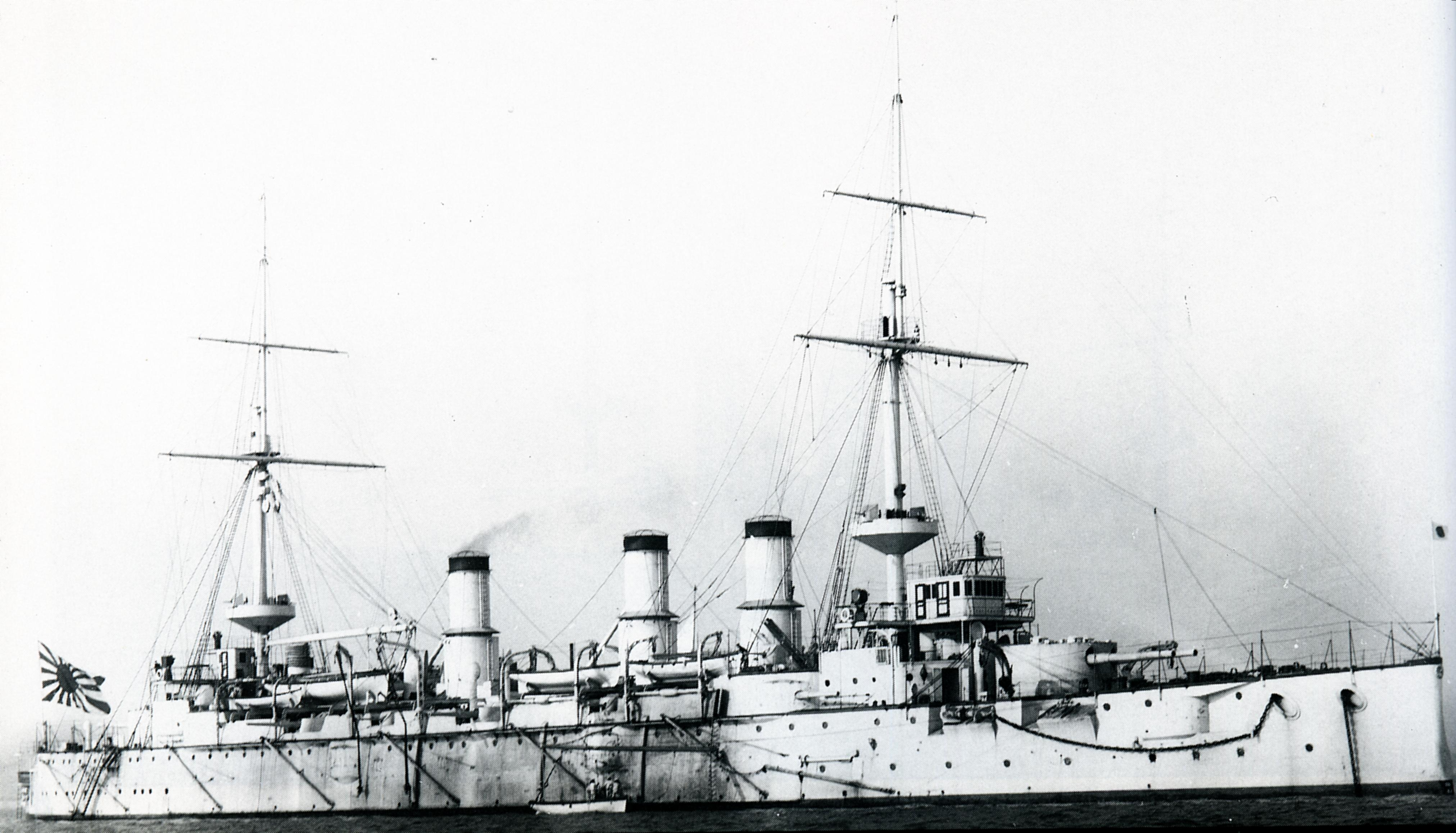
- Azuma at anchor, Portsmouth, 1900

Class overview
- Operators: Imperial Japanese Navy
- Preceded by: Yakumo
- Succeeded by: Kasuga class

History
- Name: Azuma
- Namesake: Mount Azuma
- Ordered: 12 October 1897
- Builder: Ateliers et Chantiers de la Loire, Saint-Nazaire, France
- Laid down: 1 February 1898
- Launched: 24 June 1899
- Completed: 28 July 1900
- Reclassified: As 1st class coast-defense ship, 1 September 1921
- Stricken: 1941
- Fate: Scrapped, 1946

General characteristics
- Type: Armored cruiser
- Displacement: 9,278 t (9,131 long tons)
- Length: 137.9 m (452 ft 5 in) (o/a)
- Beam: 17.74 m (58 ft 2 in)
- Draft: 7.18 m (23 ft 7 in)
- Installed power: 18,000 ihp (13,000 kW); 24 Belleville boilers
- Propulsion: 2 Shafts; 2 Vertical triple-expansion steam engines
- Speed: 21 knots (39 km/h; 24 mph)
- Range: 7,000 nmi (13,000 km; 8,100 mi) at 10 knots (19 km/h; 12 mph)
- Complement: 670
- Armament: 2 × twin 20.3 cm/45 Type 41 naval guns; 12 × single QF 6 inch /40 naval guns; 12 × single QF 12 pounder 12 cwt naval guns; 8 × single QF 3 pounder Hotchkiss guns; 5 × single 457 mm (18.0 in) torpedo tubes
- Armor: Waterline belt: 89–178 mm (3.5–7.0 in); Deck: 63 mm (2.5 in); Gun Turret: 160 mm (6.3 in); Barbette: 152 mm (6.0 in); Casemate: 51–152 mm (2.0–6.0 in); Conning tower: 356 mm (14.0 in); Bulkhead: 76 mm (3.0 in)

Azuma (吾妻) (sometimes transliterated (archaically) as Adzuma) was an armored cruiser (Sōkō jun'yōkan) built for the Imperial Japanese Navy (IJN) in the late 1890s. As Japan lacked the industrial capacity to build such warships itself, the ship was built in France. She participated in most of the naval battles of the Russo-Japanese War of 1904–05 and was lightly damaged during the Battle off Ulsan and the Battle of Tsushima. Azuma began the first of five training cruises in 1912 and saw no combat during World War I. She was never formally reclassified as a training ship although she exclusively served in that role from 1921 until she was disarmed and hulked in 1941. Azuma was badly damaged in an American carrier raid in 1945, and subsequently scrapped in 1946.

== Background and design ==
The 1896 Naval Expansion Plan was made after the First Sino-Japanese War, and included four armored cruisers in addition to four more battleships, all of which had to be ordered from overseas shipyards as Japan lacked the capability to build them itself. Further consideration of the Russian building program caused the IJN to believe that the battleships ordered under the original plan would not be sufficient to counter the Imperial Russian Navy. Budgetary limitations prevented ordering more battleships and the IJN decided to expand the number of more affordable armored cruisers to be ordered from four to six ships, believing that the recent introduction of tougher Krupp cemented armor would allow them to stand in the line of battle. The revised plan is commonly known as the "Six-Six Fleet". The first four ships were built by Armstrong Whitworth in the United Kingdom, but the last two ships were built in Germany and France. To ensure ammunition compatibility, the IJN required their builders to use the same British guns as the other four ships. In general, the IJN provided only a sketch design and specifications that each builder had to comply with; otherwise each builder was free to build the ships as they saw fit. Unlike most of their contemporaries which were designed for commerce raiding or to defend colonies and trade routes, Azuma and her half-sisters were intended as fleet scouts and to be employed in the battleline.

== Description ==
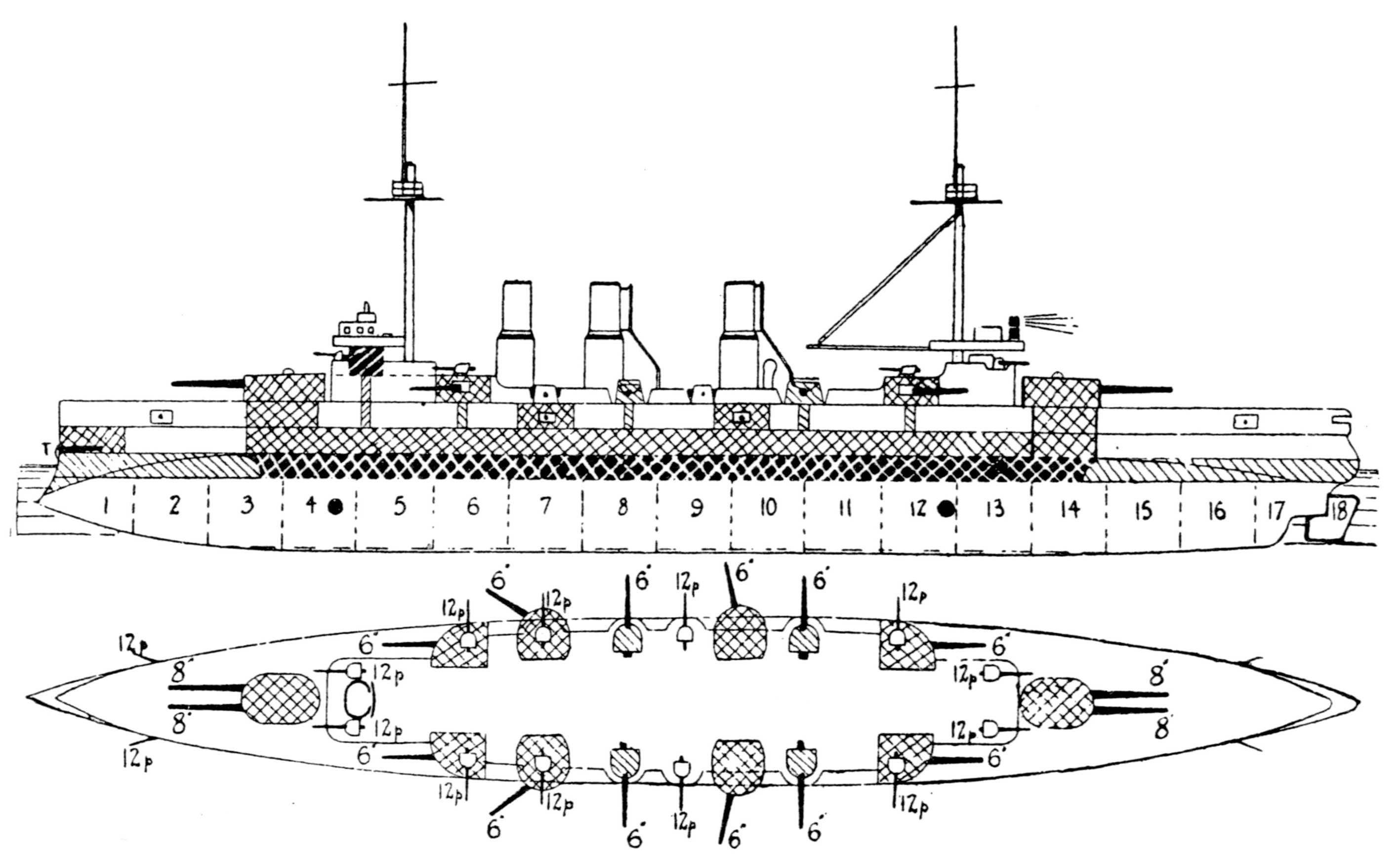
Left elevation and plan of Azuma from Jane's Fighting Ships 1904

The ship was 137.9 meters (452 ft 5 in) long overall and 131.56 meters (431 ft 8 in) between perpendiculars. She had a beam of 17.74 meters (58 ft 2 in) and had an average draft of 7.18 meters (23 ft 7 in). Azuma displaced 9,278 metric tons (9,131 long tons) at normal load and 9,953 metric tons (9,796 long tons) at deep load. The ship had a metacentric height of 0.85 meters (2 ft 9 in). She had a double bottom and her hull was subdivided into 213 watertight compartments. Her crew consisted of 670 officers and enlisted men.

Azuma had two 4-cylinder triple-expansion steam engines, each driving a single propeller shaft. Steam for the engines was provided by 24 Belleville boilers and the engines were rated at a total of 18,000 indicated horsepower (13,000 kW). The ship had a designed speed of 21 knots (39 km/h; 24 mph). She carried up to 1,200 metric tons (1,200 long tons; 1,300 short tons) of coal and could steam for 7,000 nautical miles (13,000 km; 8,100 mi) at a speed of 10 knots (19 km/h; 12 mph).

=== Armament ===
The main armament for all of the "Six-Six Fleet" armored cruisers was four Armstrong Whitworth-built 45-caliber eight-inch guns in twin-gun turrets fore and aft of the superstructure. The electrically operated turrets were capable of 130° rotation left and right, and the guns could be elevated to +30° and depressed to −5°. The turret accommodated 65 shells, but could only be reloaded through doors in the turret floor and the ship's deck that allowed the electric winch in the turret to hoist shells up from the shell room deep in the hull. The guns were manually loaded and had a rate of fire about 1.2 rounds per minute. The 203-millimeter gun fired 113.5-kilogram (250 lb) armor-piercing (AP) projectiles at a muzzle velocity of 760 meters per second (2,500 ft/s) to a range of 18,000 meters (20,000 yd).

The secondary armament consisted of a dozen Elswick Ordnance Company "Pattern Z" quick-firing (QF), 40-caliber, 6-inch guns. All but four of these guns were mounted in armored casemates on the main and upper decks, and their mounts on the upper deck were protected by gun shields. Their 45.4-kilogram (100 lb) AP shells were fired at a muzzle velocity of 700 meters per second (2,300 ft/s). Azuma was also equipped with a dozen 40-caliber QF 12-pounder 12-cwt guns (Note: "Cwt" is the abbreviation for hundredweight, 12 cwt referring to the weight of the gun.) and eight QF 2.5-pounder Yamauchi guns as close-range defense against torpedo boats. The former gun fired 76-millimeter (3 in), 5.7-kilogram (12.5 lb) projectiles at a muzzle velocity of 719 meters per second (2,359 ft/s).

Azuma was equipped with five 457 mm (18.0 in) torpedo tubes, one above water in the bow and four submerged tubes, two on each broadside. The Type 30 torpedo had a 100-kilogram (220 lb) warhead and three range/speed settings: 800 meters (870 yd) at 27 knots (50 km/h; 31 mph), 1,000 meters (1,100 yd) at 23.6 knots (43.7 km/h; 27.2 mph) or 3,000 meters (3,300 yd) at 14.2 knots (26.3 km/h; 16.3 mph).

=== Armor ===
All of the "Six-Six Fleet" armored cruisers used the same armor scheme with some minor differences, one of which was that the four later ships all used Krupp cemented armor. The waterline belt ran the full length of the ship and its thickness varied from 178 millimeters (7.0 in) amidships to 89 millimeters (3.5 in) at the bow and stern. It had a height of 2.13 meters (7 ft 0 in), of which 1.50 meters (4 ft 11 in) was normally underwater. The upper strake of belt armor was 127 millimeters (5.0 in) thick and extended from the upper edge of the waterline belt to the main deck. It extended 61.49 meters (201 ft 9 in) from the forward to the rear barbette. Azuma had only a single transverse 76 mm armored bulkhead that closed off the forward end of the central armored citadel.

The barbettes, gun turrets and the front of the casemates were all 152 millimeters thick while the sides and rear of the casemates were protected by 51 millimeters (2.0 in) of armor. The deck was 63 millimeters (2.5 in) thick and the armor protecting the conning tower was 356 millimeters (14.0 in) in thickness.

== Construction and career ==
The contract for Azuma, named after the Kantō region, was signed on 12 October 1897 with Ateliers et Chantiers de la Loire, and the ship was laid down at their shipyard in Saint-Nazaire on 1 February 1898. She was launched on 24 June 1898 and completed on 29 July 1900. Azuma left for Japan the next day and arrived in Yokosuka on 29 October. Captain Fujii Kōichi assumed command before the start of the Russo-Japanese War in February 1904, until he was relieved in January 1905 by Captain Murakami Kakuichi.

=== Russo-Japanese War ===
At the start of the Russo-Japanese War, Azuma was assigned to the 2nd Division of the 2nd Fleet. She participated in the Battle of Port Arthur on 9 February 1904, when Vice Admiral Tōgō Heihachirō led the Combined Fleet in an attack on the Russian ships of the Pacific Squadron anchored just outside Port Arthur. Tōgō had expected the surprise night attack by his destroyers to be much more successful than it was, anticipating that the Russians would be badly disorganized and weakened, but they had recovered from their surprise and were ready for his attack. The Japanese ships were spotted by the protected cruiser Boyarin, which was patrolling offshore and alerted the Russians. Tōgō chose to attack the Russian coastal defenses with his main armament and engage the ships with his secondary guns. Splitting his fire proved to be a poor decision as the Japanese eight- and six-inch guns inflicted little damage on the Russian ships, which concentrated all their fire on the Japanese ships with some effect. Although many ships on both sides were hit, Russian casualties numbered some 150, while the Japanese suffered roughly 90 killed and wounded before Tōgō disengaged.

In early March, Vice Admiral Kamimura Hikonojō was tasked to take the reinforced 2nd Division north and make a diversion off Vladivostok. While scouting for Russian ships in the area, the Japanese cruisers bombarded the harbor and defenses of Vladivostok on 6 March to little effect. Upon their return to Japan a few days later, the 2nd Division was ordered to escort the transports ferrying the Imperial Guards Division to Korea and then to join the ships blockading Port Arthur. Kamimura was ordered north in mid-April to cover the Sea of Japan and defend the Korea Strait against any attempt by the Vladivostok Independent Cruiser Squadron, under the command of Rear Admiral Karl Jessen, to break through and unite with the Pacific Squadron. The two units narrowly missed each other on the 24th in heavy fog, and the Japanese proceeded to Vladivostok, where they laid several minefields before arriving back at Wonsan on the 30th.

The division failed to intercept the Russian squadron as it attacked several transports south of Okinoshima Island on 15 June, due to heavy rain and fog. The Russians sortied again on 30 June, and Kamimura finally was able to intercept them the next day near Okinoshima. The light was failing when they were spotted and the Russians were able to disengage in the darkness. Jessen's ships sortied again on 17 July, headed for the eastern coast of Japan to act as a diversion and pull Japanese forces out of the Sea of Japan and the Yellow Sea. The Russian ships passed through Tsugaru Strait two days later and began capturing ships bound for Japan. The arrival of the Russians off Tokyo Bay on the 24th caused the Naval General Staff to order Kamimura to sail for Cape Toi Misaki, Kyūshū, fearing that Jessen would circumnavigate Japan to reach Port Arthur. Two days later he was ordered north to the Kii Channel and then to Tokyo Bay on the 28th. The General Staff finally ordered him back to Tsushima Island on the 30th; later that day he received word that Jessen's ships had passed through the Tsugaru Strait early that morning and reached Vladivostok on 1 August.

==== Battle off Ulsan ====
On 10 August, the ships at Port Arthur attempted a breakout to Vladivostok, but were turned back in the Battle of the Yellow Sea. Jessen was ordered to rendezvous with them, but the order was delayed. His three armored cruisers, Rossia, Gromoboi, and Rurik, had to raise steam, so he did not sortie until the evening of 13 August. By dawn he had reached Tsushima, but turned back when he failed to see any ships from the Port Arthur squadron. 36 miles (58 km) north of the island he encountered Kamimura's squadron, which consisted of four modern armored cruisers, Iwate, Izumo, Tokiwa, and Azuma. The two squadrons had passed during the night without spotting one another and each had reversed course around first light. This put the Japanese ships astride the Russian route to Vladivostok.

Jessen ordered his ships to turn to the northeast when he spotted the Japanese at 05:00 and they followed suit, albeit on a slightly converging course. Both sides opened fire around 05:23 at a range of 8,500 meters (9,300 yd). The Japanese ships concentrated their fire on Rurik, the rear ship of the Russian formation. She was hit fairly quickly and began to fall astern of the other two ships. Jessen turned southeast in an attempt to open the range, but this blinded the Russian gunners with the rising sun and prevented any of their broadside guns from bearing on the Japanese. About 06:00, Jessen turned 180° to starboard in an attempt to reach the Korean coast and to allow Rurik to rejoin the squadron. Kamimura followed suit around 06:10, but turned to port, which opened the range between the squadrons. Azuma then developed engine problems and the Japanese squadron slowed to conform with her best speed. Firing recommenced at 06:24 and Rurik was hit three times in the stern, flooding her steering compartment; she had to be steered with her engines. Her speed continued to decrease, further exposing her to Japanese fire, and her steering jammed to port around 06:40.

Jessen made another 180° turn in an attempt to interpose his two ships between the Japanese and Rurik, but the latter ship suddenly turned to starboard and increased speed and passed between Jessen's ships and the Japanese. Kamimura turned 180° as well so that both squadrons were heading southeast on parallel courses, but Jessen quickly made another 180° turn so that they headed on opposing courses. The Russians reversed course for the third time around 07:45 in another attempt to support Rurik although Rossia was on fire herself; her fires were extinguished about twenty minutes later. Kamimura circled Rurik to the south at 08:00, then allowed the other two Russian ships to get to his north and gave them an uncontested route to Vladivostok. Despite this, Jessen turned back once more at 08:15 and ordered Rurik to make her own way back to Vladivostok before turning north at his maximum speed, about 18 knots (33 km/h; 21 mph).

About this time Kamimura's two elderly protected cruisers, Naniwa and Takachiho, were approaching from the south. Their arrival allowed Kamimura to pursue Jessen with all of his armored cruisers while the two new arrivals dealt with Rurik. They fought a running battle with the Russians for the next hour and a half; scoring enough hits on them to force their speed down to 15 knots (28 km/h; 17 mph). Azuma's engines again broke down during this chase and she was replaced in the line by Tokiwa. The Japanese closed to a minimum of about 5,000 meters (5,500 yd), but Kamimura then opened the range up to 6,500 meters (7,100 yd).

About 10:00, Kamimura's gunnery officer erroneously informed him that Izumo had expended three-quarters of her ammunition, and he turned back after a five-minute rapid-fire barrage. He did not wish to leave the Tsushima Strait unguarded and thought that he could use his remaining ammunition on Rurik. By this time she had been sunk by Naniwa and Takachiho, which had closed to within 3,000 meters (3,300 yd) of Rurik in order to finish her off. They had radioed Kamimura that she was sunk, but he did not receive the message. Shortly after the Japanese turned back, Gromoboi and Rossia were forced to heave-to to make repairs. None of the Japanese ships were seriously damaged and Azuma only suffered eight men wounded during the battle.

On 30 December, Azuma and the armored cruiser Asama were ordered to patrol Tsugaru Strait to prevent any blockade runners from reaching Vladivostok. In mid-February, Azuma was relieved by Iwate so the former could be refitted.

==== Battle of Tsushima ====
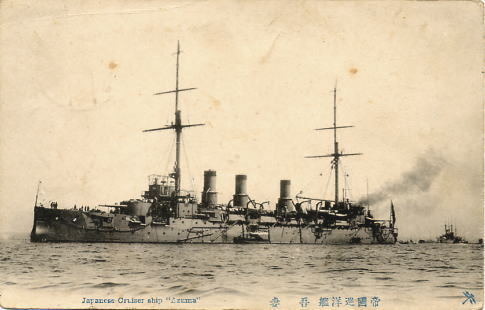
A postcard of Azuma at anchor, circa 1905

As the Russian 2nd and 3rd Pacific Squadrons approached Japan on 27 May, having sailed from the Baltic Sea, Yakumo was assigned to Kamimura's 2nd Division of the 2nd Fleet. The Russians were spotted by patrolling Japanese ships early that morning, but visibility was limited and radio reception poor. The preliminary reports were enough to cause Tōgō to order his ships to put to sea and the 2nd Division spotted the Russian ships under the command of Vice Admiral Zinovy Rozhestvensky at around 11:30. Kamimura closed to about a range of 8,000 meters (8,700 yd) before sheering off under fire to join Tōgō's battleships. Azuma was second of six when Tōgō opened fire on the 2nd Pacific Squadron at 14:10 and, unlike most of the ships in the division, initially engaged the battleship Knyaz Suvorov. At 14:50, a 12-inch (305 mm) shell knocked out Azuma's aft right 8-inch gun. By 15:00, the Russian formation was in disorder and Knyaz Suvorov suddenly appeared out of the mist at 15:35 at a range of about 2,000 meters (6,600 ft). All of Kamimura's ships engaged her for five minutes or so, with Azuma and the armored cruiser Yakumo also firing torpedoes at the Russian ship without effect.

After 17:30 Kamimura led his division in a fruitless pursuit of some of the Russian cruisers, leaving Tōgō's battleships to their own devices. He abandoned his chase around 18:03 and turned northwards to rejoin Tōgō. His ships spotted the rear of the Russian battleline around 18:30 and opened fire when the range closed to 8,000–9,000 meters (8,700–9,800 yd). Nothing is known of any effect on the Russians and they ceased fire by 19:30 and rejoined Tōgō at 20:08 as night was falling. The surviving Russian ships were spotted the next morning and the Japanese ships opened fire around 10:30, staying beyond the range at which the Russian ships could effectively reply. Rear Admiral Nikolai Nebogatov therefore decided to surrender his ships as he could neither return fire nor close the range. Over the course of the entire battle, Azuma was struck by seven large shells, mostly 12 inch, four 6- and about four 75-millimeter shells. They inflicted only minor damage other than destroying one 6-inch and one 12-pounder gun mounts.

On 14 June, Azuma (along with Yakumo, the armored cruisers Nisshin and Kasuga) was assigned of the 3rd Fleet, under the command of Vice Admiral Kataoka Shichirō, for the capture of Sakhalin in July.

=== Subsequent career ===
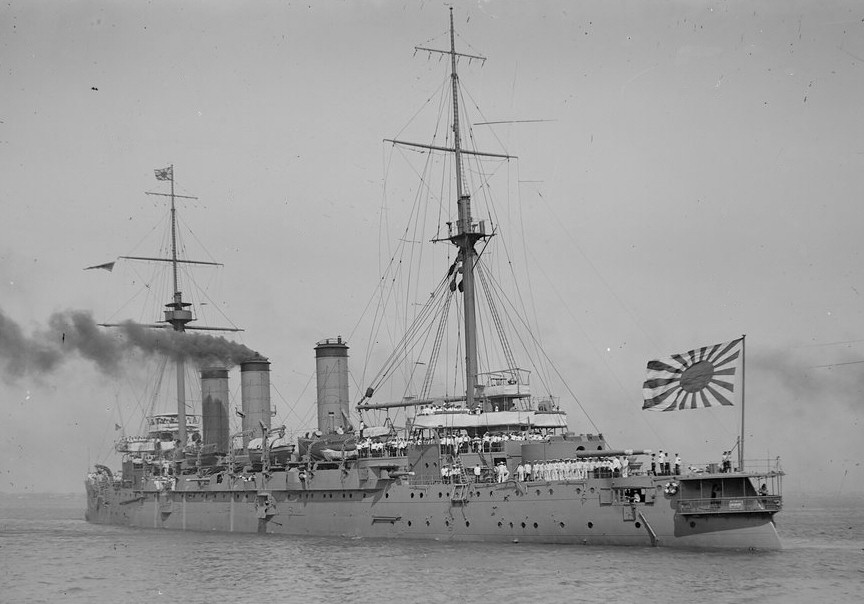
Azuma at anchor in Australia, 1910s

Azuma was assigned to the Training Squadron on 20 April 1912, where she conducted long-distance oceanic navigation and officer training for cadets in the Imperial Japanese Navy Academy. From 5 December 1912 to 21 April 1913, the ship accompanied the ex-Russian protected cruiser Soya on a training cruise to Australia and Southeast Asia, the first of five overseas training cruises that she would make. Azuma was briefly relieved of her assignment from 1 May to 1 December before beginning another training cruise to North America and Hawaii, together with Asama, on 20 April–11 August 1914. The ship was again relieved of her assignment with the Training Squadron on 18 August, and was not reassigned until 1 September 1915 in preparation for her next training cruise that lasted from 20 April to 22 August 1916, and visited Australia and Southeast Asia again. The next month she was relieved of her assignment and then became the flagship of Destroyer Squadron (Suiraisentai) 2 from 1 December 1916 to 28 March 1917, and then again from 4 August to 24 January 1918. In early 1917, Azuma was dispatched on a diplomatic mission to return the body to the United States of George W. Guthrie, the Ambassador to Japan, who had died while in office. The ship rejoined the Training Squadron on 10 August 1918, together with Tokiwa, and made her last two training cruises over the next two years. From 1 March to 26 July 1919, the cruisers visited Australia and Southeast Asia and then the Mediterranean from 24 November to 20 May 1920. Azuma left the Training Squadron on 6 June.

=== Final years ===
On 1 September 1921, the ship was re-designated as a 1st-class coast-defense ship. By this time her engines were in bad shape and she became a training ship for the Maizuru Naval Corps a week later. In 1924, four of Azuma's 12-pounder guns were removed, as were all of her QF 2.5-pounder guns, and a single 8 cm/40 3rd Year Type anti-aircraft gun was added. In addition three of her torpedo tubes were removed. On 1 October 1927, she became a stationary training ship for the Maizuru engineering school. Azuma was refitted again in 1930; this included replacement of her boilers that reduced her horsepower to 9,400 ihp (7,000 kW) and her speed to 16 knots (30 km/h; 18 mph). Four of each of her 6-inch and 12-pounder guns were removed during the refit.

Azuma was stricken from the navy list, hulked, and disarmed in 1941. On 18 July 1945, she was badly damaged by aircraft from the United States Navy TF-38 when they attacked Yokosuka. The ship was scrapped in 1946.
