= Six-Six Fleet =

Japanese shipbuilding program

The Six-Six Fleet was a shipbuilding program initiated by the Imperial Japanese Navy (IJN) in the wake of the First Sino-Japanese War and the Triple Intervention. The program was the brainchild of Yamamoto Gombei, who would later become the Minister of the Navy and the eighth Prime Minister of Japan. The completion of the plan led to the emergence of Japan as a first-class naval power. Whereas during the war with China, the Japanese had gone into the conflict with a makeshift force of warships, they would now have a true battle fleet, the core of which consisted of six battleships and six armored cruisers, giving the plan its name.

== Origins ==
After the First Sino-Japanese war there was a tide of popular enthusiasm for naval glory that was created by Japan's recent triumphs at sea. Domestically, the war and the favorable settlement were also tremendous political successes for both the government and the armed services. However, with the Triple Intervention on 23 April, the governments of France, Germany and Russia pressured Japan to renounce its claim to the Liaotung Peninsula. The Japanese were well aware of the naval power the three countries possessed in East Asian waters, particularly Russia. Without the diplomatic, political or military support of either Britain or the United States and consequently facing little choice the Japanese retroceded the territory back to China for an additional 30 million taels (roughly ¥45 million). Although the victory against China had elevated Japan's status, it also further entangled the country in the imperial rivalries in East Asia and the Pacific. The Triple Intervention had also underscored the extent of Japan's maritime weakness in relation to the West. However this maritime weakness, combined with the political and popular capital gained as a result of the war with China, also subsequently encouraged popular and legislative support for naval expansion in the aftermath of the war.

Japanese Naval Construction Program (1896–1905)
Warship type	Number
First-class steel battleships	4
First-class cruisers	6
Third-class cruisers	3
Torpedo gunboats	1
Torpedo depot vessels	1
Destroyers	23
First-class torpedo boats	16
Second-class torpedo boats	37
Third-class torpedo boats	10
	Total Ships
Capital Ships	16
Destroyers and torpedo boats	88
Total Cost	¥ 213,100,964

== Plans ==
In May 1895, the Minister of the Navy Saigō Tsugumichi asked Yamamoto Gombei to compose a study of Japan's future naval needs. Yamamoto, who had been newly appointed to his position as Chief of the Naval Affairs Bureau, sensed that a great opportunity existed to secure significant fleet expansion. Approaching his task with unrelenting enthusiasm, Yamamoto devised a revolutionary plan that would fundamentally transform the navy into a world-class military fleet.

While Russia was perceived to be Japan's most likely enemy in any future conflict, Yamamoto chose to consider other scenarios rather than simply preparations for a war with Russia. Yamamoto believed that Japan should have sufficient naval strength to not only to deal with a single hypothetical enemy separately, but to also confront any naval force from two combined powers that might be dispatched against Japan from overseas waters; this included Britain and to a lesser extent France in his calculations. Yamamoto assumed that with their conflicting global interests, it was highly unlikely that Britain and Russia would ever join in a war against Japan. He considered that it was more likely that Russia or possibly Britain in alliance with a lesser naval power like France or Germany, would dispatch a portion of their fleet against Japan. Yamamoto therefore calculated that four battleships would be the main battle force that either Britain or Russia could divert from their other naval commitments to use against Japan and he also added two more battleships that might be contributed to such a naval expedition by a lesser hostile power. Yamamoto came up with six as the number of battleships that Japan would need have to have in order to achieve victory. The depth of the Suez Canal was at that time only 27 ft (8 m) and the largest warships then being built, which were Britain's 15,000-ton Majestic class, had a mean draft of equal depth and therefore could not transit the canal. Such a fleet of warships would have to pass around the Cape of Good Hope, not only would this route take time but every European navy with the exception of the Royal Navy, would have to encounter considerable problems in coaling along the way. Furthermore, establishing repair and docking facilities along the route and in East Asian waters for the largest warships would be an enormous expense for any nation.

Thus, for its minimum naval security Japan should have a force of six of the largest battleships supplemented by four armored cruisers of at least 7,000 tons. The centerpiece of this expansion was to be the acquisition of four new battleships in addition to the two which were already being built in Britain being part of an earlier construction program: the Fuji and Yashima. Yamamoto was not simply recommending the building of a battleship force, he was also advocating the construction of a balanced fleet. Just as in the army the infantry was supported by the artillery, cavalry, and engineers, so battleships should be supplemented by lesser warships of various types. Specifically, this meant the inclusion of cruisers that could seek out and pursue the enemy along with a sufficient number of destroyers and torpedo boats capable of striking the enemy in his home ports. The program also included the construction of twenty-three destroyers, sixty-three torpedo boats, and an expansion of Japanese shipyards and repair and training facilities.

Given the changes in naval technology at the time as well as the rapidly shifting balance of naval strength among the maritime powers, no sooner had the 1896 naval expansion plan been authorized than it had to be amended. The program had originally called for the construction of four armored cruisers. Further consideration of Russian building plans led the Japanese to conclude that the six battleships authorized under the 1896 plan might not be sufficient after all, if the Russian navy should decide to concentrate in East Asian waters. Yet budgetary limitations simply did not permit the construction of another battleship squadron. However, as the new Harvey and KC armor plates could resist all but the largest AP shells, Japan could now acquire armored cruisers that could take the place in the battle line. Hence, with new armor and lighter but more powerful quick-firing guns, this new cruiser type was superior to many older battleships still afloat. Subsequently, in the 1897 revisions to the ten-year plan led to the four protected cruisers being substituted for two additional armored cruisers. And as a consequence "Six-Six Fleet" was born: six battleships and six armored cruisers.

== Implementation ==
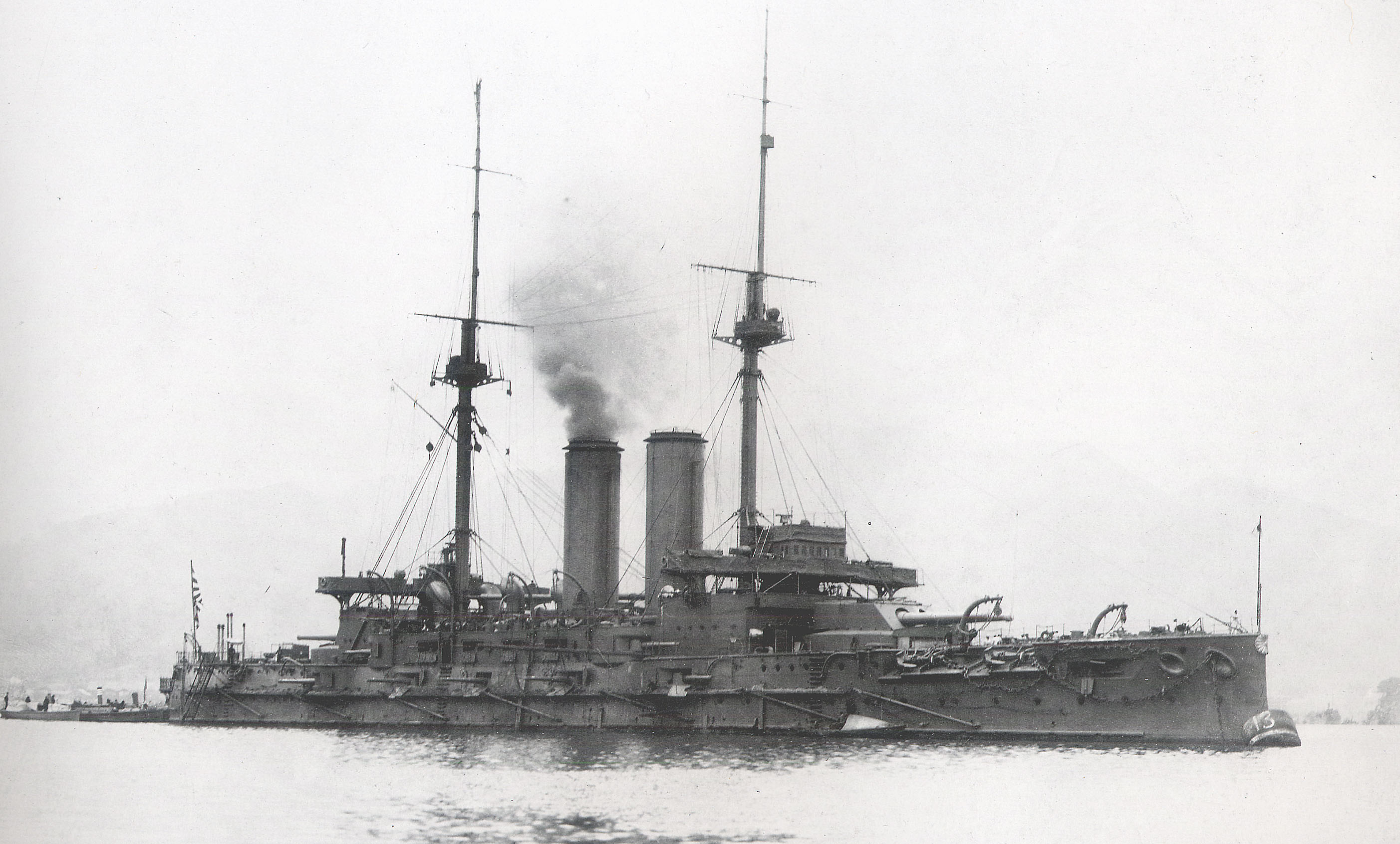
Mikasa was one of the six battleships ordered as part of the program.

The Six-six fleet was approved by the cabinet in late 1895 and funded by the Diet in early 1896. The proposed program for a 260,000-ton navy was to be completed over a ten-year period with the total cost being ¥280 million, of this total warship acquisitions accounted for just over ¥200 million, in two stages of construction. The first stage would begin in 1896 and be completed by 1902; the second would run from 1897 to 1905. The program was financed significantly from the Chinese indemnity secured after the First Sino-Japanese war. This was used to fund the bulk of the naval expansion, roughly ¥139 million, with public loans and existing government revenue providing the rest of the financing required over the ten years of the program. Critically, this meant that there would no increase in the land tax needed to support naval increases, at least in 1895–96, which was crucial in securing widespread parliamentary support. The government did, however, propose a tax increase on sake and tobacco to pay for additional operating expenses that would accompany fleet expansion. Japan's industrial resources at the time were inadequate for the construction of a main battle force of armored warships domestically, as the country was still in the process of developing and acquiring the industrial infrastructure for the construction of major naval vessels. As a result, 90 percent of the 234,000 tons of naval construction contracted for under the ten-year beginning 1896-97 was to be foreign built, and when complete would constitute 70 percent of the Japanese fleet. Of this, the overwhelming majority was built in British shipyards. With the completion of the fleet, Japan would become the fourth strongest naval power in the world in a single decade.

== See also ==
- Eight-Eight fleet
