= 20.3 cm/45 Type 41 naval gun =

World War II Japanese naval gun

Type 41 203 mm 45 caliber naval gun
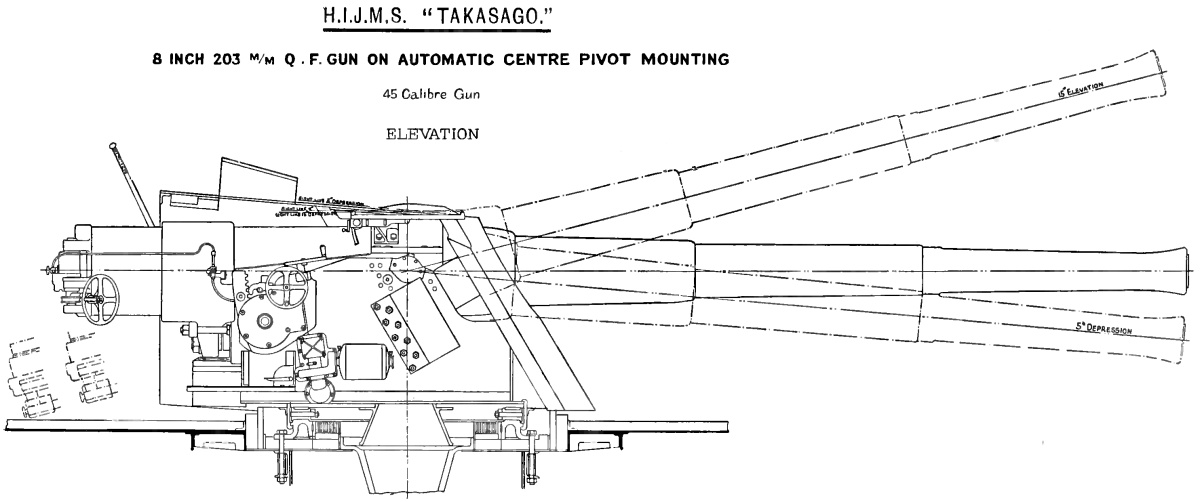
- Right elevation diagram of an 8-inch center pivot mounting for Japanese cruiser Takasago.
- Type: Naval gun Coastal artillery
- Place of origin: Japan

Service history
- In service: 1908–1945
- Used by: Imperial Japanese Navy
- Wars: World War I World War II

Production history
- Designer: Elswick Ordnance Company

Specifications
- Mass: 18.75–19.4 t (18.45–19.09 long tons)
- Length: 9.487 m (31 ft)
- Barrel length: 9.114 m (30 ft) bore
- Caliber: 203 mm (8.0 in)
- Action: Manual
- Breech: Single motion interrupted screw
- Elevation: -5° to +30°
- Traverse: +/- 150°
- Rate of fire: 2 rpm
- Muzzle velocity: 760 m/s (2,500 ft/s)
- Effective firing range: 18,000 m (20,000 yd) at +30°

The 20.3 cm/45 Type 41 naval gun was a Japanese naval and coast-defense gun used on cruisers of the Imperial Japanese Navy from the Russo-Japanese War through the end of World War II.

== Design and development ==
The 20.3 cm/45 Type 41 naval gun was a designation applied to existing foreign produced EOC 8 inch 45 caliber Pattern S, U, W guns which had been produced by Armstrong of Great Britain and Ansaldo of Italy and a license-produced Japanese variant. Licensed production of Japanese guns based on Pattern S drawings began in 1902 and in 1908 a modified version with a different rifling pattern and a resized propellant chamber was produced. Ships produced before 1902 in foreign shipyards most likely had Pattern S, U, W guns. While ships produced or refit after 1902 in Japanese shipyards most likely have Japanese-built guns. These weapons were officially designated as Type 41 on 25 December 1908, and re-designated again on 5 October 1917 in centimeters.

The first ship armed with these guns was the protected cruiser Takasago completed in 1898 by Armstrong and armed with Pattern S guns. The last ships armed with these guns were probably the Ibuki-class armored cruisers built between 1905 and 1911. This series of guns also armed the armored cruisers Asama, Azuma, Iwate, Izumo, Kasuga, Nisshin, Tokiwa and Yakumo. Many of these ships were disarmed under the conditions of the Washington Naval Treaty or subsequent London Naval Treaty and their guns converted into coastal artillery batteries, including installations at Tokyo Bay, Tarawa and later at Wake Island during World War II.

== Gallery ==
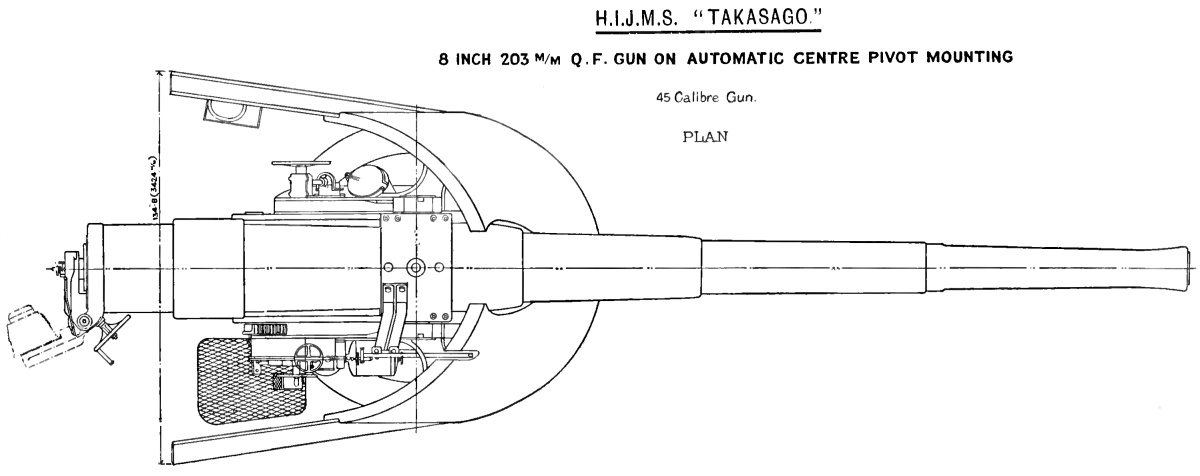
A single 8 inch gun on center pivot mounting for Japanese cruiser Takasago commissioned 1898.

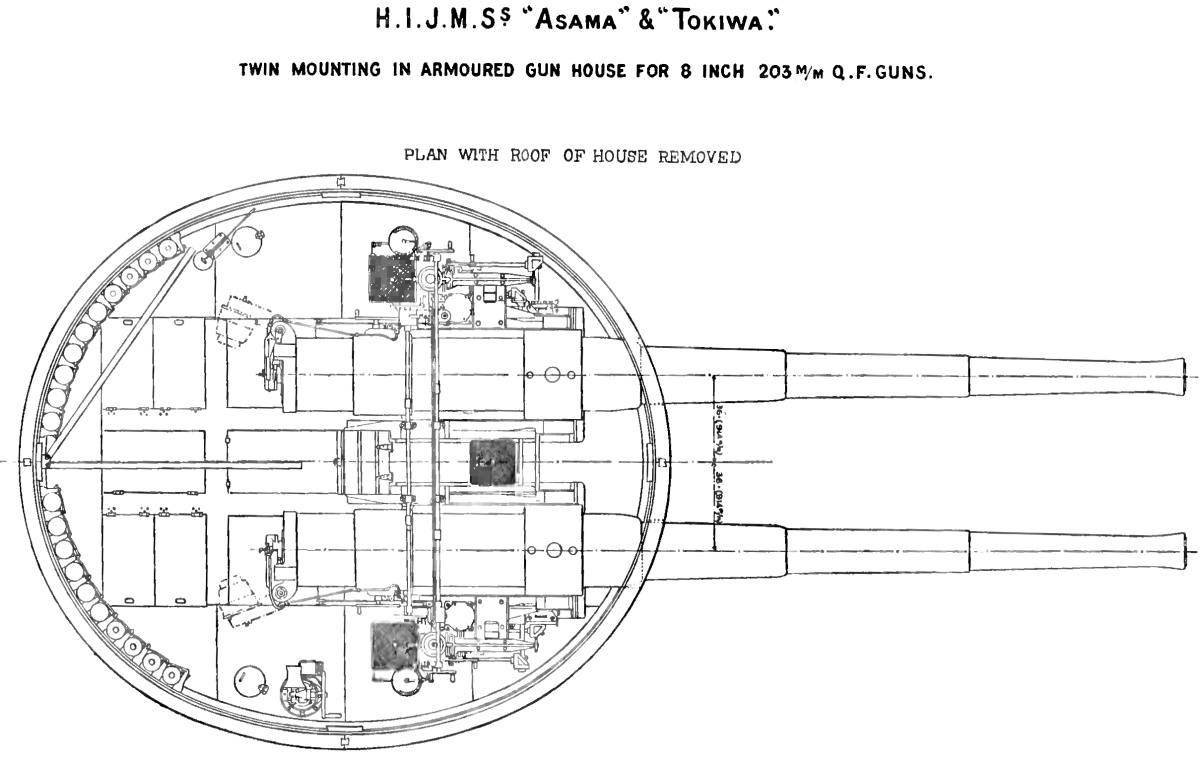
A diagram of a twin 8 inch gun turret of Japanese Asama class cruiser.

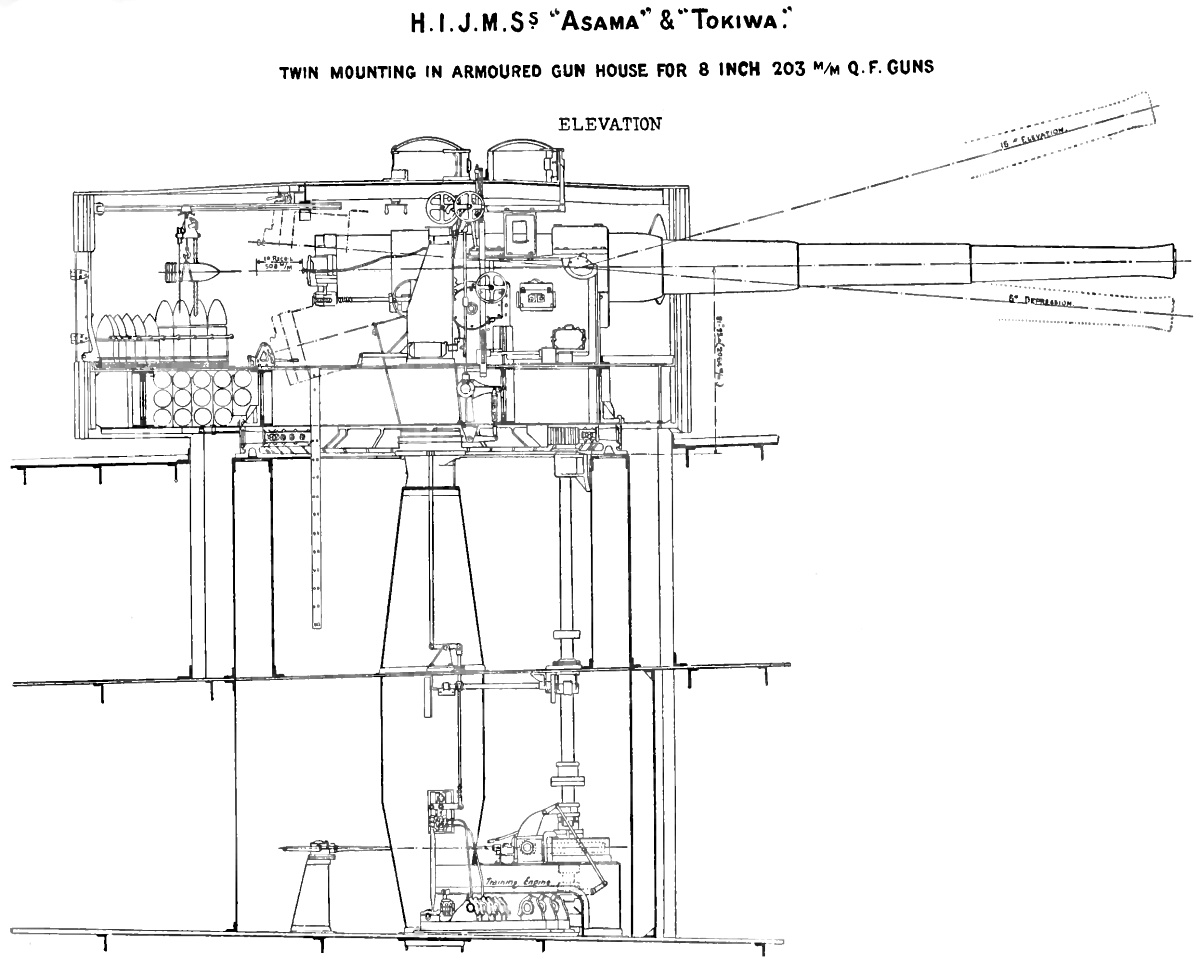
Right elevation diagram of a twin 8 inch gun turret of Japanese Asama class cruiser.

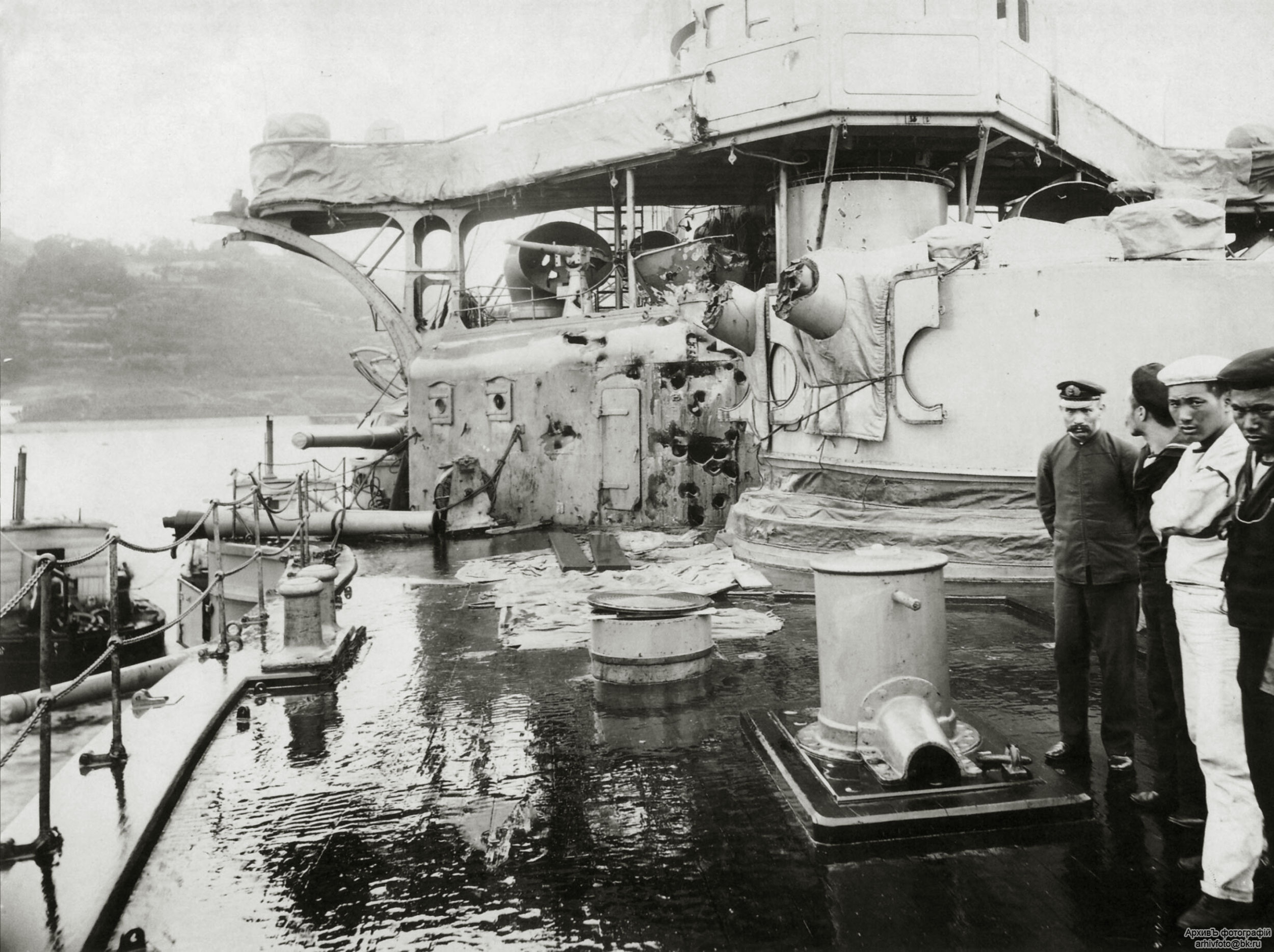
Damage to Japanese armored cruiser Nisshin after a direct hit by a 12-inch shell during the Battle of Tsushima in May 1905. The explosion injured future Admiral Isoroku Yamamoto.

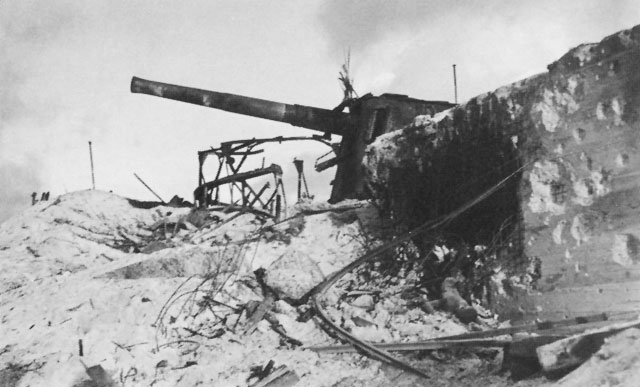
One of the four destroyed Japanese eight-inch guns on Betio caused by naval gunfire and air strikes.

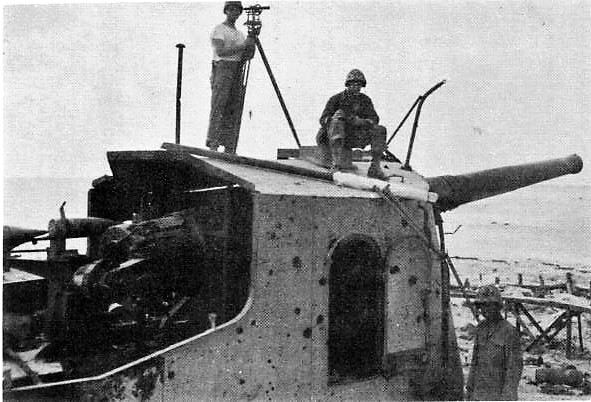
Possibly one of the same guns from a different angle.
