= Russian ship Pallada =

At least three warships of Russia have borne the name Pallada:

- Russian frigate Pallada, a sailing frigate
- Russian cruiser Pallada (1899), the lead ship of her class of protected cruisers. The ship was launched in 1899 and sunk at Port Arthur in December 1904. Salvaged by Japan, it was refitted and commissioned into the Imperial Japanese Navy as Tsugaru.
- Russian cruiser Pallada (1906), the armored cruiser of the Bayan class. Launched in 1911 and, sunk by a German submarine in the Baltic Sea on 11 October 1914 shortly after the outbreak of World War I.

== See also ==
- Pallada (tallship), a modern tallship
