= Russian cruiser Svetlana (1896) =

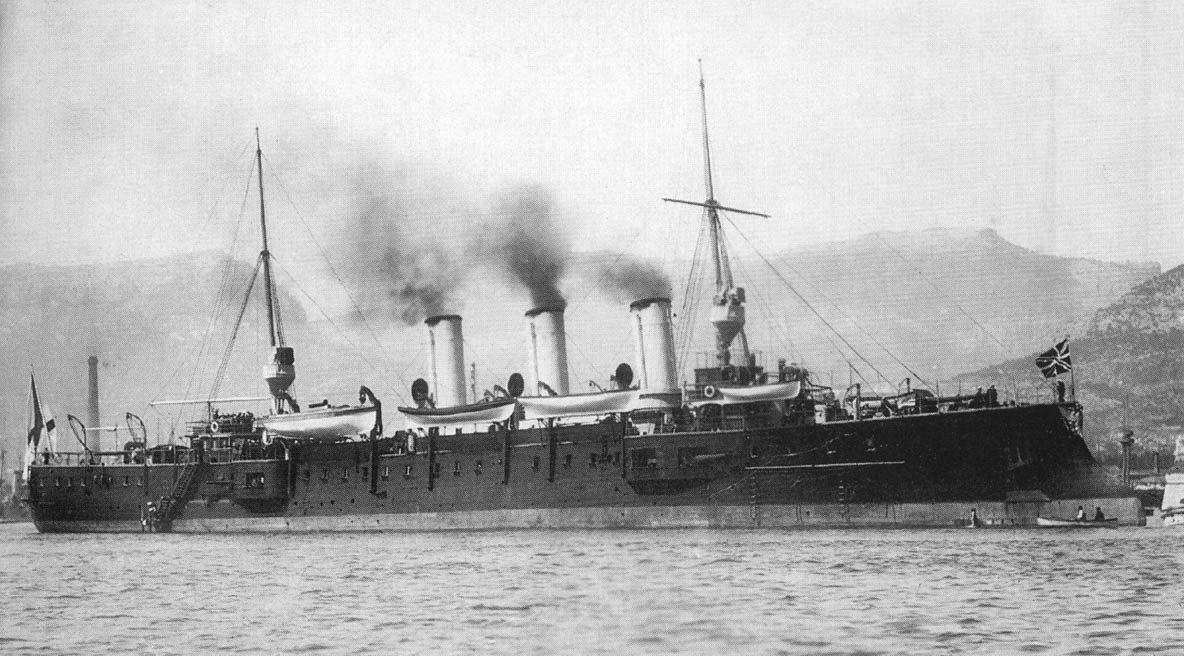
- Svetlana

Class overview
- Name: Svetlana
- Operators: Imperial Russian Navy
- Preceded by: Admiral Kornilov
- Succeeded by: Pallada class
- Built: 1895–97
- In commission: 1897–1905
- Completed: 1
- Lost: 1

History

Russian Empire
- Name: Svetlana (Russian: Светлана)
- Builder: Forges et Chantiers de la Méditerranée, Le Havre, France
- Laid down: 8 December 1895
- Launched: 6 December 1896
- Commissioned: 3 April 1899
- Fate: Sunk, 28 May 1905, during the Battle of Tsushima

General characteristics
- Type: Protected cruiser
- Displacement: 3,862 long tons (3,924 t)
- Length: 331 ft 4 in (101 m)
- Beam: 42 ft 8 in (13 m)
- Draft: 18 ft 8 in (5.7 m)
- Installed power: 18 Belleville boilers; 8,500 ihp (6,300 kW)
- Propulsion: 2 shafts, 2 triple-expansion steam engines,
- Speed: 21 knots (39 km/h; 24 mph)
- Complement: 401 officers and crewmen
- Armament: 6 × 1 - 6-inch (152 mm) Canet guns; 10 × 1 - 47-millimeter (1.9 in) Hotchkiss guns; 2 × 15-inch (381 mm) torpedo tubes; 20 mines
- Armor: Deck: 1–2 in (25–51 mm); Conning tower: 4 in (102 mm)

The Russian cruiser Svetlana (Russian: Светлана) was a protected cruiser of the Imperial Russian Navy. She was the flagship of the Commander-in-Chief of the Imperial Russian Navy and was used as an imperial yacht in peacetime. She was sunk in combat during Battle of Tsushima in the Russo-Japanese War.

== Background and design ==
Svetlana was constructed to provide Grand Duke Alexei Alexandrovich Romanov with a royal yacht. As the younger brother of Tsar Alexander III and uncle of Tsar Nicholas II, Grand Duke Alexei was commander-in-chief of the Imperial Russian Navy.

Svetlana was ordered from Forges et Chantiers de la Méditerranée at Le Havre and was launched there on 6 December 1896

Svetlana was based on the design of the French Friant-class cruiser and incorporated features intended for use as a royal yacht.

The cruiser was equipped with six 152-mm Canet guns, ten 47-mm Hotchkiss guns and two torpedoes; however, its armor was slightly less than that of her French sister ships. In place of the armor, Svetlana had luxurious facilities for the Grand Duke, including wooden decks, and an apartment with living room, study and bedroom and a large bathroom, together with a rooms for his servants.

== Operational history ==
The shakedown cruiser of Svetlana was with a 388-man crew in the Mediterranean from Toulon. After successful completion of testing, she was sent directly to Lisbon to represent Russia at the 400th anniversary celebrations of the opening of a sea route to India by Vasco de Gama, where she hosted the Portuguese royal family. After returning via Le Harve for final repairs, she went to Kiel, where she was visited by officers from the Imperial German Navy before continuing on to her home port of Kronstadt on 23 June 1898.

Grand Duke Alexei used his new yacht for the first time in early July for visits to ports around the Baltic Sea and for naval maneuvers. Svetlana accompanied the yacht of Grand Duke Mikhail Alexandrovich Romanov to a visit to Copenhagen in 1899. On 22 May 1899, Svetlana was used by Grand Duke Vladimir Alexandrovich Romanov on an expedition to Trondheim and Arkhangelsk (from which the Grand Duke returned to St. Petersburg by train). Svetlana continued to Bear Island near Spitsbergen, evicting two German expeditions who were exploring for mineral resources and locations for a fishing station. She returned on 8 August 1899 to Kronstadt.

In 1900, Svetlana took Grand Duke Alex to Reval, and at the end of June took members of the Russian Imperial Family to Kiel and Copenhagen. She continued to serve as a yacht for the Imperial household from 1901 to 1903 to ports around the Baltic Sea.

=== Russo-Japanese War ===
After the start of the Russo-Japanese War in 1904, Grand Duke Alexei offered the use of Svetlana as part of the reinforcements to be sent to the Russian Pacific Fleet on 15 March 1904. Svetlana was refitted with a new rangefinder and wireless system, and four of her Hotchkiss guns were replaced with 75-mm cannon. Assigned to the Second Pacific Squadron under the overall command of Admiral Dmitry von Fölkersam, she was greatly overloaded with stores and extra coal for the long voyage via the Suez Canal and Indian Ocean to the Pacific.

At the Battle of Tsushima, Svetlana led a squadron with the yacht Almaz and the auxiliary cruiser Ural. At the start of the battle, the squadron fell back to protect the support vessels; however at around 1500 hours, Svetlana was hit severely in the bow, putting her electrical system out of action. That evening, Svetlana initially joined the Oleg and Aurora under the overall command of Vice Admiral Oskar Enkvist in an attempt to evade the Japanese fleet and to flee to Manila. However, unable to match the speed of the more modern Russian cruisers, Svetlana then attempted to sail north for Vladivostok in the company of the destroyer Bystry. The pursuing Japanese caught up at daybreak close to the Korean coast, and Bystry was run aground, where her 82 crewmen (including 10 men rescued from Oslyabya) were captured.

At 0930 hours, the Japanese cruisers Niitaka and Otowa, along with the destroyer Murakumo had closed to within gunnery range of Svetlana. By 1035, Svetlana was on fire, and began to sink at 1050. Her final position was 37°6′N 129°50′E southwest of the island of Ulleungdo. As the Japanese cruisers continued north to pursue more reported Russian warships (which turned out to be Norwegian whalers), the Japanese support vessel America Maru rescued the 290 survivors from Svetlana, of whom 23 were wounded. An estimated 169 crewmen of Svetlana were lost in the battle.
