= Bogatyr-class cruiser =

1901 class of Russian protected cruisers

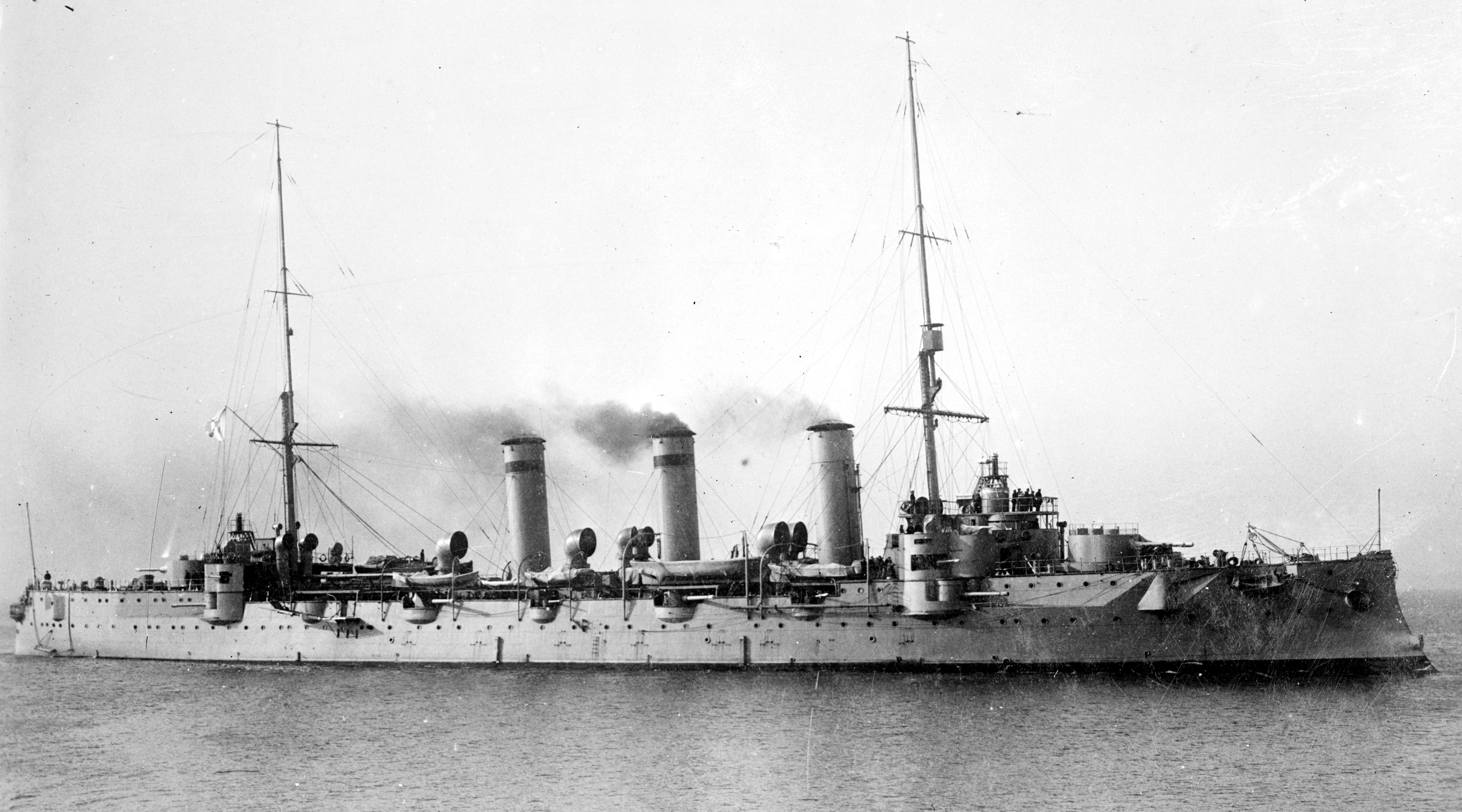
- Oleg in April 1918

Class overview
- Name: Bogatyr class
- Operators: Imperial Russian Navy; Soviet Navy
- Preceded by: Askold
- Succeeded by: Novik
- Built: 1898–1907
- In commission: 1902–1942
- Planned: 5
- Completed: 4
- Lost: 1

General characteristics
- Type: Protected cruiser
- Displacement: 6,645 long tons (6,752 t)
- Length: 134 m (439 ft 8 in)
- Beam: 16.6 m (54 ft 6 in)
- Draught: 6.3 m (20 ft 8 in)
- Installed power: 16 Normand-type boilers; 23,000 ihp (17,000 kW)
- Propulsion: 2 shafts; 2 triple-expansion steam engines
- Speed: 23 knots (43 km/h; 26 mph)
- Complement: 589
- Armament: 12 × 152 mm (6 in) guns (2 twin turrets and 8 single guns), replaced by 130 mm (5 in) guns in subsequent refits for all ships; 12 × 75 mm (3 in) guns; 8 × 47 mm (1.9 in) guns; 2 × 37 mm (1.5 in) guns; 2 × 15 in (380 mm) torpedo tubes
- Armour: Deck: 80 mm (3.1 in); Turrets: 127 mm (5 in); casemates: 80 mm (3.1 in); Conning tower: 140 mm (5.5 in)

The Bogatyr class were a group of protected cruisers built for the Imperial Russian Navy. Unusually for the Russian navy, two ships of the class were built for the Baltic Fleet and two ships for the Black Sea Fleet.

== Description ==
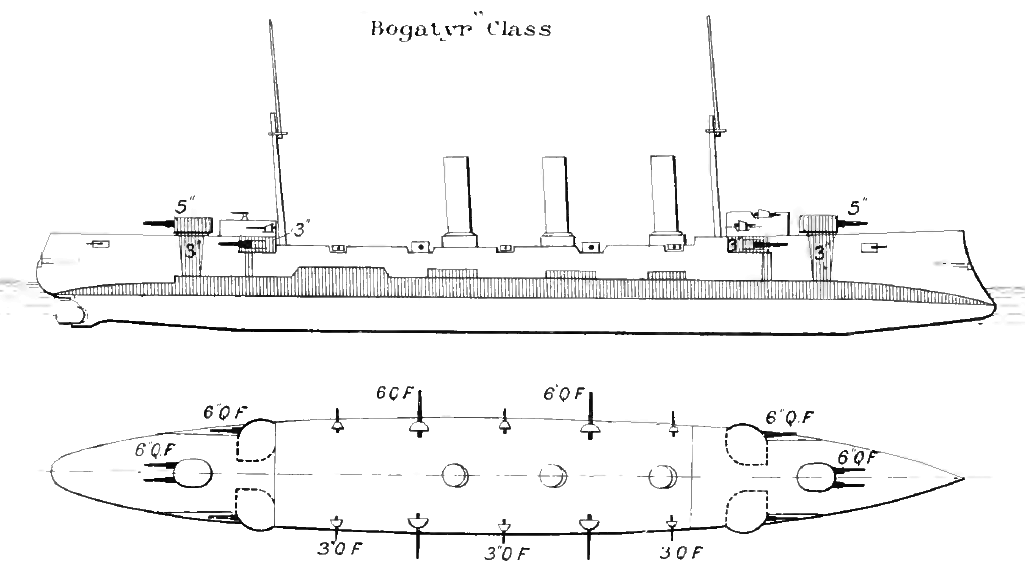
Line drawing of the Bogatyr class showing armament layout

After the completion of the Pallada class, the Russian Navy issued requirements for three large protected cruisers to three separate companies: Varyag was ordered from William Cramp & Sons in Philadelphia, United States, Askold was ordered from Krupp-Germaniawerft in Kiel, Germany, and Bogatyr from Vulcan Stettin, also in Germany. Although Askold was the fastest cruiser in the Russian fleet at the time of its commissioning, Bogatyr was selected for further development into a new class of ships.

The Bogatyr-class cruisers normally displaced 6,340 long tons (6,440 t). The ships had an overall length of 134.9 metres (442 ft 7 in), a beam of 16.4 metres (53 ft 10 in) and a mean draft of about 6.8 metres (22 ft 4 in). They were powered by two vertical triple-expansion steam engines, each driving one shaft, which developed a total of 19,500 indicated horsepower (14,500 kW) and gave a maximum speed of 23 knots (43 km/h; 26 mph). The engines were powered by 16 coal-fired Belleville boilers. The ships had a range of 2,100 nautical miles (3,900 km; 2,400 mi) at a speed of 12 knots (22 km/h; 14 mph). The standard crew consisted of 573 officers and men.

The ships were rearmed during World War I with fourteen 55-caliber 130 mm (5.1 in) B7 Pattern 1913 guns in single mounts, four of which were mounted in casemates. The anti-aircraft armament consisted of two 75-millimeter (3 in) guns.

The armored deck and the casemates were 76 millimeters (3 in) thick. The armor of the conning tower was 152 millimetres (6 in) thick.

== Ships ==
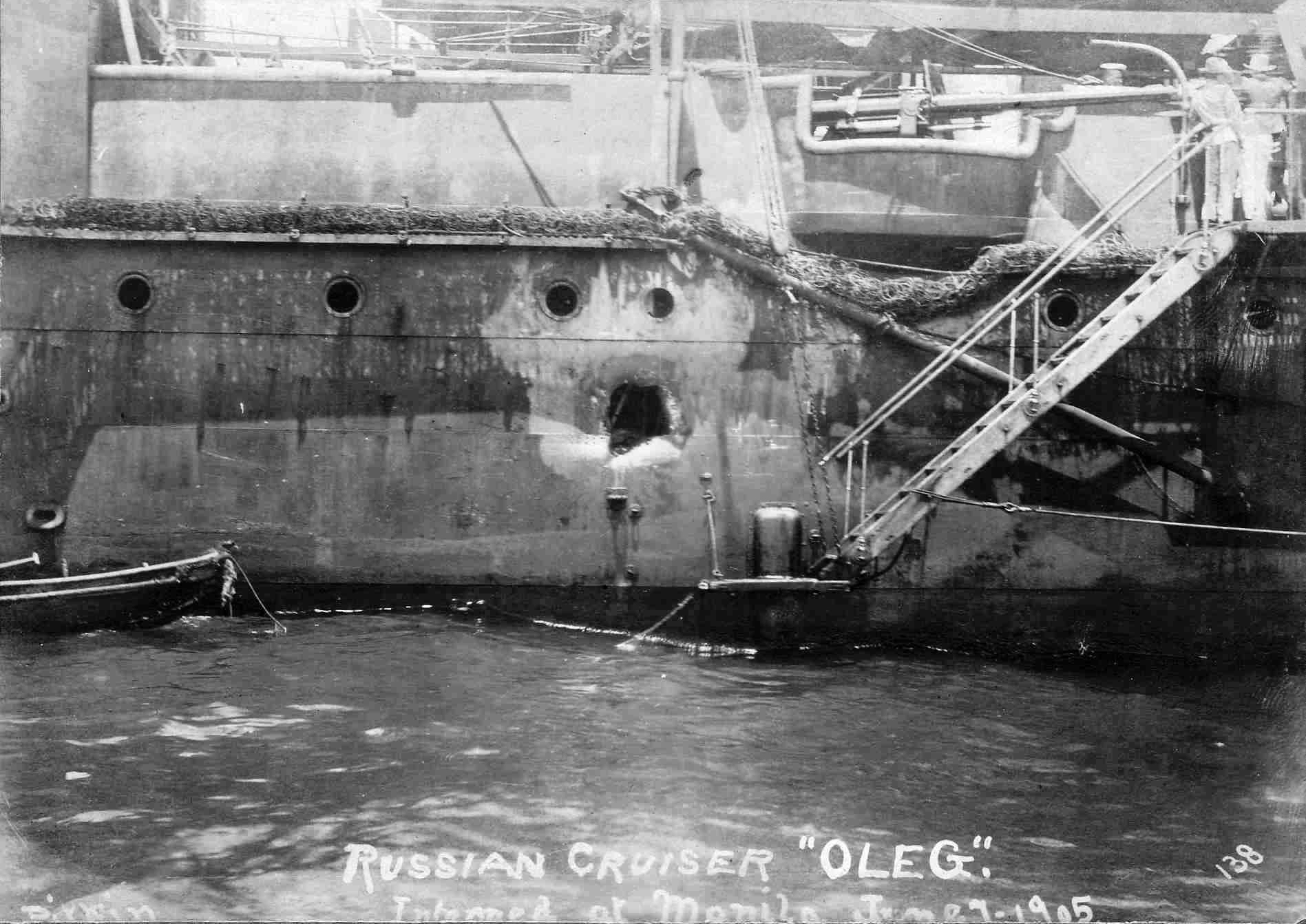
Battle damage to cruiser Oleg inflicted at the Battle of Tsushima. Photo taken June 1905 at Manila Bay.

- Bogatyr was built by Vulkan yard, Stettin, Germany. Laid down 1898, launched January 1901, completed 1902, scrapped 1922. Her machinery was used to repair Komintern.
- Oleg was built by New Admiralty Yard, St Petersburg. Laid down 1901, launched August 1903, completed 1904, fought at the Battle of Tsushima, escaped, and was interned at Manila. Finally sunk by British Coastal Motor Boat 4 with a single torpedo in Kronstadt harbour on 17 June 1919 during the British Campaign in the Baltic. The wreck was salvaged and scrapped.
- Kagul (renamed Ochakov, later General Kornilov) was built by Sevastopol dockyard. Laid down 1900, launched October 1902, completed 1905, seized by the White forces in the Russian Civil War and interned in Bizerta in 1920 as part of Wrangel's fleet, sold for scrap in 1933.
- Pamiat Merkuria (later Komintern) was built by Nikolayev Dockyard. Laid down 1900, launched June 1903, completed 1907. Mutinied during the revolution of 1905 which delayed completion. Survived the Russian Civil War and served in the Soviet Navy, Black Sea Fleet as Komintern. Damaged by German bombers in World War II she was sunk as a breakwater in Poti, Georgia on 10 October 1942, after her guns had been removed for use in shore batteries.
- A fifth ship, Vityaz, being built in St. Petersburg was so badly damaged by a fire after laying down that she was cancelled.

== Sources ==
- Breyer, Siegfried (1992). Soviet Warship Development: Volume 1: 1917–1937. London: Conway Maritime Press. ISBN 0-85177-604-3.
- Budzbon, Przemysław (1985). "Russia". In Gray, Randal (ed.). Conway's All the World's Fighting Ships 1906–1921. Annapolis, Maryland: Naval Institute Press. pp. 291–325. ISBN 0-85177-245-5.
- Campbell, N. J. M. (1979). "Russia". In Chesneau, Roger & Kolesnik, Eugene M. (eds.). Conway's All the World's Fighting Ships 1860–1905. New York: Mayflower Books. pp. 170–217. ISBN 0-8317-0302-4.
- Frampton, Victor; Head, Michael; McLaughlin, Stephen & Spurgeon, H. L. (2003). "Russian Warships off Tokyo Bay". Warship International. XL (2): 119–125. ISSN 0043-0374.
- Rohwer, Jürgen (2005). Chronology of the War at Sea 1939–1945: The Naval History of World War Two (Third Revised ed.). Annapolis, Maryland: Naval Institute Press. ISBN 1-59114-119-2.
- Whitley, M. J. (1995). Cruisers of World War Two: An International Encyclopedia. London: Cassell. ISBN 1-86019-874-0.
