= Russian cruiser Pallada (1899) =

1899 Pallada-class cruiser

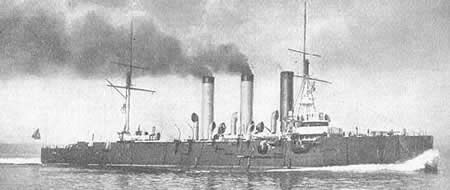
- Pallada circa 1903

History

Russian Empire
- Name: Pallada
- Namesake: Pallas (daughter of Triton)
- Builder: Admiralty Shipyard, Saint Petersburg, Russia
- Laid down: 1 December 1895
- Launched: August 1899
- Fate: Sunk, 8 December 1904

Empire of Japan
- Name: Tsugaru
- Acquired: by Japan as prize of war, 1905
- Decommissioned: 1922
- Fate: Expended as target, 1924

General characteristics
- Class & type: Pallada-class protected cruiser
- Displacement: 6,731 long tons (6,839 t)
- Length: 126.8 m (416 ft)
- Beam: 16.8 m (55 ft 1 in)
- Draught: 7.3 m (24 ft)
- Installed power: 24 Belleville boilers; 13,000 ihp (9,700 kW)
- Propulsion: 3 shafts; 3 triple-expansion steam engines
- Speed: 19 knots (35 km/h; 22 mph)
- Complement: 578
- Armament: 8 × 152 mm (6 in) guns; 24 × 75 mm (3 in) guns; 8 × 37 mm (1.5 in) guns; 3 × 380 mm (15 in) torpedo tubes
- Armour: Deck: 50–62 mm (2.0–2.4 in); Conning tower: 150 mm (5.9 in)

Pallada was the lead ship in the Pallada class of protected cruisers in the Imperial Russian Navy. She was built in the Admiralty Shipyard at Saint Petersburg, Russia. The new class was a major improvement on previous Russian cruisers, although the armor protection was light.

== Background ==
The Pallada class consisted of three cruisers built expressly with the intention of strengthening the Russian fleet in the Far East. Pallada and Diana were both laid down in December 1895 but Pallada was launched first in August 1899, followed by Diana in October 1899. Aurora, which survives in Saint Petersburg as a museum ship, was laid down in June 1897 and was not launched until May 1900. Soon after commissioning, both Pallada and Diana were assigned to the Russian First Pacific Squadron at Port Arthur, Manchuria.

== Operational history ==
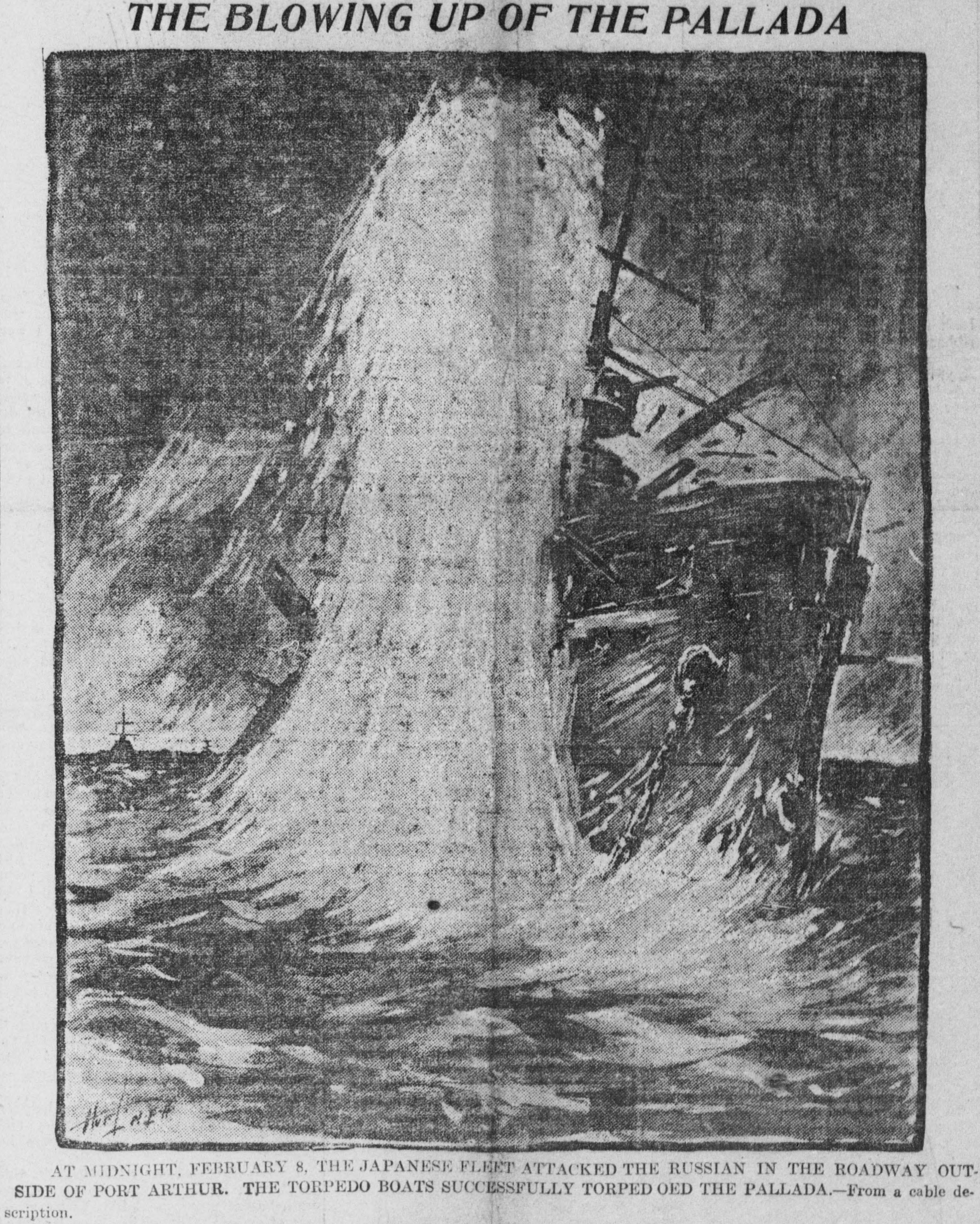
Torpedoing of Pallada (artist's conception).

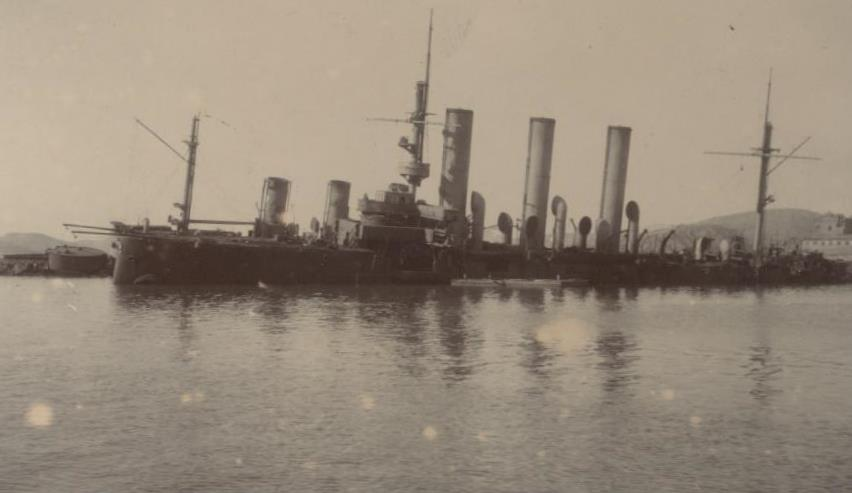
Pallada sunk at Port Arthur

In the initial Japanese attacks on Port Arthur on the night of 8 February 1904, Pallada was torpedoed on the port side amidships, but despite a fire in her coal bunker, she was not seriously damaged.

In August 1904 at the Battle of the Yellow Sea, after being struck by a torpedo, Pallada managed to make her way back to Port Arthur, and was thus unable to break through the Japanese blockade along with a number of other Russian cruisers. Thereafter, Pallada was trapped in the harbor. Her guns were removed to help strengthen the land defenses and most of her crew was reassigned to serve as infantry. Pallada was sunk by Japanese 11-inch siege howitzers on 8 December 1904.

After the end of the war, the wreck of Pallada was raised and towed to Japan, where it was repaired and commissioned into the Imperial Japanese Navy as a prize of war. Renamed Tsugaru, she served as a training vessel and later as a minelayer until decommissioned in 1922 and sunk as a target in 1924.
