= 152 mm 45 caliber Pattern 1892 =

152mm 45 caliber Pattern 1892
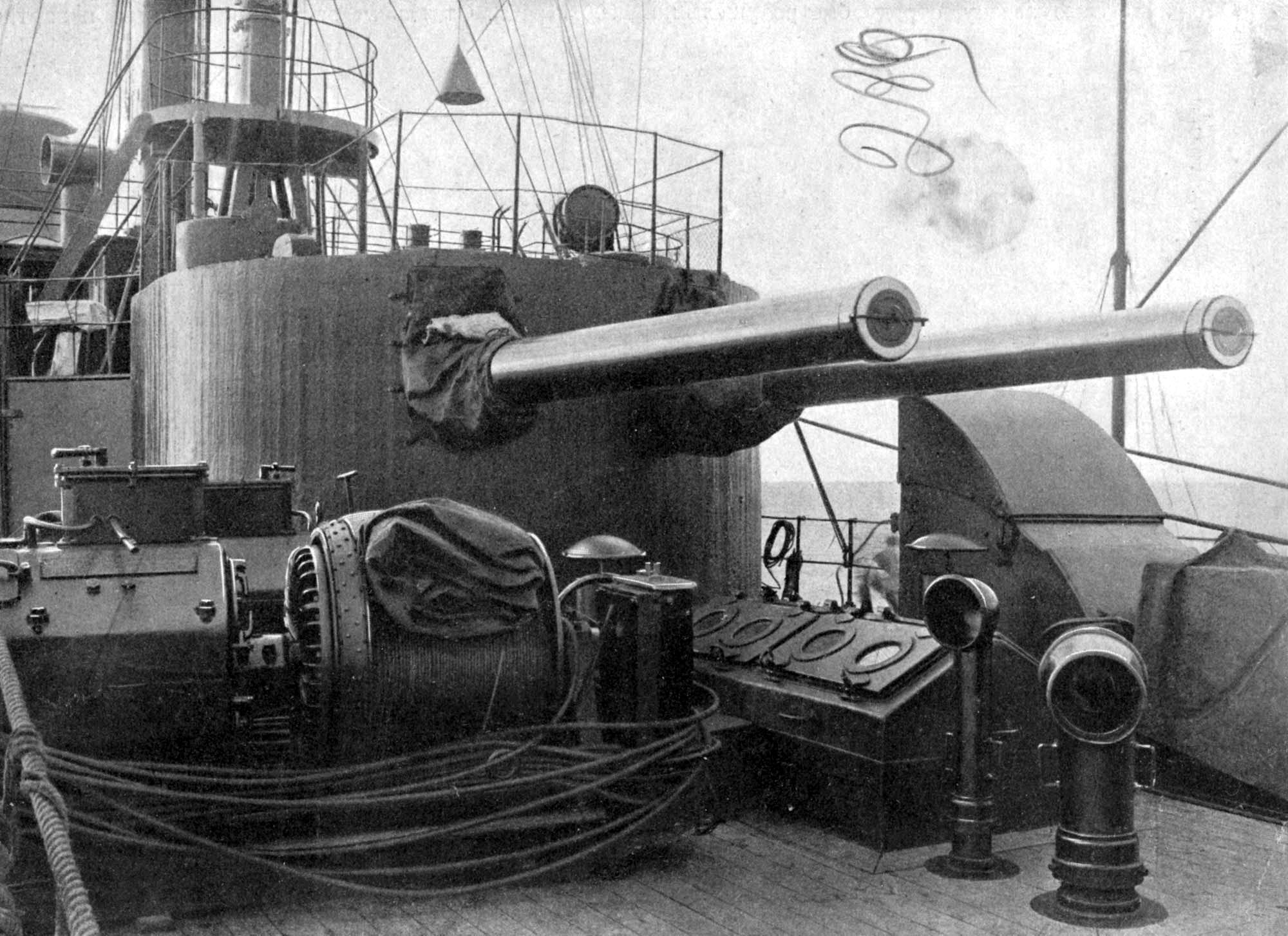
- Twin gun turret aboard the cruiser Oleg
- Type: Naval gun Coastal artillery Railway artillery
- Place of origin: France

Service history
- In service: 1897–2003
- Used by: Russian Empire; Soviet Union; Finland; Japan; Romania; Estonia
- Wars: Boxer Rebellion; Russo-Japanese War; World War I Russian Civil War; Winter War; World War II

Production history
- Designer: Canet
- Designed: 1891
- Manufacturer: Obukhov; Perm
- Produced: 1897
- No. built: 351
- Variants: 1897–1901; 1909–1918

Specifications
- Mass: 5.8–6.3 t (6.4–6.9 short tons)
- Length: 6.8 m (22 ft 4 in)
- Barrel length: 5.3 m (17 ft 5 in)
- Shell: Early guns: Fixed QF ammunition. Later guns: Separate QF ammunition.
- Shell weight: 41.4 kg (91 lb)
- Caliber: 152 mm (6.0 in) 45 caliber
- Elevation: -6° to +25°
- Rate of fire: 2–7 rpm
- Muzzle velocity: 792 m/s (2,600 ft/s)
- Maximum firing range: 15.5 km (9.6 mi) at +25°

The 152mm 45 caliber Pattern 1892 was a Russian naval gun developed in the years before the Russo-Japanese War that armed a variety of warships of the Imperial Russian Navy during the Russo-Japanese War and World War I. Guns salvaged from scrapped ships found a second life on river gunboats of the Soviet Navy during the Russian Civil War and as coastal artillery and railway artillery during World War II. In 1941 it was estimated that there were 196 guns (82 in the Baltic, 70 in the Pacific, 37 in the Black sea and 7 in the Northern fleet) still in use as coastal artillery. After independence in 1917 Finland was estimated to have inherited 100 guns and some remained in use until the 1980s. The last was decommissioned in 2003.

== History ==
In 1891 a Russian naval delegation was shown three guns designed by the French designer Canet. One was a 75/50 gun caliber gun, one was a 120/45 gun, and the last was a 152/45 gun. All three guns used fixed QF ammunition which produced a rate of fire of 15 rpm for the 75/50 gun, 12 rpm for the 120/45 gun and 10 rpm for the 152/45 gun. The Russians were impressed and in 1892 they negotiated a production license for all three guns. In practice the rate of fire of 10 rpm was hard to achieve due to difficulties with ammunition handling. The practical rate of fire varied by class of ship from a low of 2 rpm in the Petropavlovsk-class battleships, to a high of 7 rpm in single deck mounted guns. In 1901 the fixed ammunition was changed to separate loading QF cased charge and projectile.

== Construction ==
There were two main series of the 152/45 guns produced. The first series of guns were constructed of a thick A tube, a 3.2 m (10 ft 6 in) long B tube and jacket. 215 of the first series of guns were built between 1897 and 1901, 181 at the Obhukov factory and 37 at the Perm factory. During the Russo-Japanese war a number of gun barrels burst in action and a strengthened series of 133 guns were produced, 21 at the Obhukov factory and 112 at the Perm factory between 1909 and 1918. The strengthened series of guns had a thinner A tube reinforced with three sections of B tube and a jacket which was 4 m (13 ft 1 in) long.

== Naval use ==
The 152/45 guns armed the majority of armored cruisers, pre-dreadnought battleships and protected cruisers of the Imperial Russian Navy built between 1890 and 1916.

=== Armored cruisers ===
- Admiral Kornilov – This ships primary armament consisted of five 152/45 guns per side, in single mounts after a 1905 refit.
- Bayan-class – This class of four ships secondary armament consisted of four casemated 152/45 guns per side, in single mounts, amidships.
- Dmitriy Donskoi-class – The primary armament of Dmitrii Donskoi consisted of six 152/45 guns, in single mounts, after an 1895 refit. The primary armament of Vladimir Monomakh consisted of five 152/45 guns in single mounts after an 1897 refit.
- Minin – The primary armament of this ship consisted of three casemated 152/45 guns per side, in single mounts after an 1893 refit.
- Rurik-class – The secondary armament of Gromoboi, Rossia and Rurik consisted of eight casemated 152/45 guns per side, in single mounts.

=== Gunboats ===
- Khrabryy – The secondary armament of this ship consisted of one 152/45 gun.
- Korietz-class – This class of nine ships secondary armament consisted of one 152/45 gun.

=== Pre-dreadnought battleships ===
- Borodino-class – This class of five ships secondary armament consisted of six 152/45 guns per side, in twin gun turrets, amidships.
- Ekaterina II-class – Two ships of this class were refitted with 152/45 guns. Sinop was refit with twelve single mount guns as secondary armament in 1909. Georgii Pobedonosets was refit with fourteen single mount guns as secondary armament in 1909.
- Evstafi-class – This class of two ships tertiary armament consisted of six casemated 152/45 guns per side, in single mounts, amidships.
- Imperator Aleksandr II – This ships tertiary armament consisted of four casemated 152/45 guns per side, in single mounts, amidships after a 1904 refit.
- Peresvet-class – This class of three ships secondary armament consisted of five casemated 152/45 guns per side, in single mounts, amidships. One more gun was in a casemate in the bow.
- Petropavlovsk-class – This class of three ships secondary armament consisted of four 152/45 guns per side, mounted in twin turrets, amidships. Two more casemated guns, per side, were in single mounts, amidships.
- Petr Veliky – This ship's secondary armament consisted of twelve 152/45 guns after a 1907 refit.
- Potemkin – This ship's secondary armament consisted of eight casemated 152/45 guns per side, in single mounts, amidships.
- Retvizan – This ship's secondary armament consisted of six casemated 152/45 guns per side, in single mounts, amidships.
- Rostislav – This ship's secondary armament consisted of four 152/45 guns per side, in twin turrets, amidships.
- Sissoi Veliky – This ship's secondary armament consisted of three casemated 152/45 guns per side, in single mounts, amidships.
- Tri Sviatitelia – This ship's secondary armament consisted of four casemated 152/45 guns per side, in single mounts, amidships.
- Tsesarevich – This ship's secondary armament consisted of six 152/45 guns per side, in twin gun turrets, amidships.

=== Protected cruisers ===
- Askold – This ship's primary armament consisted of twelve 152/45 guns in single mounts.
- Bogatyr-class – This class of four ships primary armament consisted of four 152/45 guns in twin turrets fore and aft. Another four casemated guns, per side, were in single mounts, amidships.
- Pallada-class – This class of three ships primary armament consisted of eight 152/45 guns.
- Svetlana – This ship's primary armament consisted of one 152/45 gun for and aft. Another two casemated guns, per side were in single mounts, amidships.
- Varyag – This ship's primary armament consisted of twelve 152/45 guns in single mounts.

== Finnish use ==
When Finland became independent in 1917, the northern half of the coastal fortifications belonging to the Imperial Russian Peter the Great's Naval Fortress system protecting St. Petersburg fell in to Finnish hands mostly intact. The coastal guns included about 100 units of the 152 mm 45 caliber Canet gun and this type became the primary coastal gun of its class in Finland. It was given the designation "152/45 C". There was considerable variation between the guns as they included both naval and army coastal gun models from different years. Two different gun mountings were used, with about 70 guns on taller coastal gun mountings while the remaining 30 guns were on lower ship deck mounts with lower maximum elevation and range.

Finnish coastal artillery staff made modifications to the gun mountings during the interwar period. The most significant of these was inverting the gun so that the recuperating springs were on top of the gun, which allowed increasing the maximum elevation and thus the range. Inverting the gun, however, also required strengthening the recuperator, adding a spring equilibrator to correct the changed balance and other changes to the mounting and elevation mechanism. The increased maximum elevation also made it possible to use the gun as an anti-aircraft weapon. To increase maximum range even more the ammunition for the guns was modified by adding a ballistic cap to existing ammunition, which increased the range by a factor of 1.5. Additionally, the Finns changed the gun loading procedure to allow reloading without the need to return the gun to zero elevation after each shot. This practice increased the rate of fire.

During World War II the 152/45 C was the de facto Finnish standard coastal gun with 95 guns in the inventory at the beginning of 1939. During the Winter War coastal batteries equipped with the gun defended against Soviet Navy attacks before the sea froze over. The guns also provided important artillery support for the Finnish army: at both ends of the Mannerheim line there were coastal batteries equipped with 152/45 C guns, and their role was important given the Finnish lack of field artillery. Other coastal batteries in the northern part of Lake Ladoga also supported land battles, and later in the war coastal forts in Gulf of Vyborg and Kotka participated in the fighting. 18 guns were lost during the war, most of them when coastal forts had to be abandoned. 76 guns remained in use after Winter War.

During the Interim Peace Finland began constructing the Salpa Line to fortify the new border, replacing the Mannerheim Line fortifications. The Salpa Line artillery included six 152/45 C guns. In the Continuation War the 152/45 C was involved in the fighting again and several guns were lost to barrel explosions or were simply worn out. Some guns lost in the Winter War were recaptured, bringing the total to 78 pieces in 1943. By 1 May 1944 the number had dropped to 60. During World War II 152/45 C guns were also used as anti-aircraft guns. The guns, designed originally before aircraft had been invented, were not especially effective in this role even after the modifications that had been made. Despite the limitations they were used against enemy bomber formations, especially in the defense of Helsinki and also against fighters. Finland also used 152/45 C guns as railway guns. The first trials with a 152/45 C gun mounted on a railway carriage in Finland were performed in 1924 and the gun was given the designation 152/45 CRaut. Winter War mobilization plans called for a two gun railway battery, but due to equipment problems only a single gun was available for most of the war. In the Continuation War the battery was expanded to four guns. On 21.9.1941 the battery was renamed the 2nd railway battery after the 1st railway battery had been formed from captured Soviet 180 mm railway guns. The battery was disbanded and the guns removed from the railway carriages after the war, but the plans for re-forming it remained in place. In 1962 there were three guns reserved for forming a railway artillery battery.

After the Continuation War ended with the Moscow Armistice, the Allied Control Commission demanded that all coastal guns larger than 120 mm in calibre east of Porkkala had to be removed and placed in storage. This included the coastal fortifications around Porkkala, fortifications of the capital Helsinki (18 152 mm guns) and the Kotka-Hamina area forts (17 152/45 C guns). This restriction was lifted in 1947 after signing of the Paris Peace Treaty. The 152/45 C guns were badly worn out after the war, and several had cracked or broken barrels. An investigation of the barrel failures concluded that the guns could not withstand the pressures created by the gunpowder used. This led to a development of a new light weight high explosive shell which could be fired by a half-charge of gunpowder. The worn-out gun barrels were replaced with newly developed 50 caliber 152 50 Tampella barrels.

=== 152 50 Tampella ===
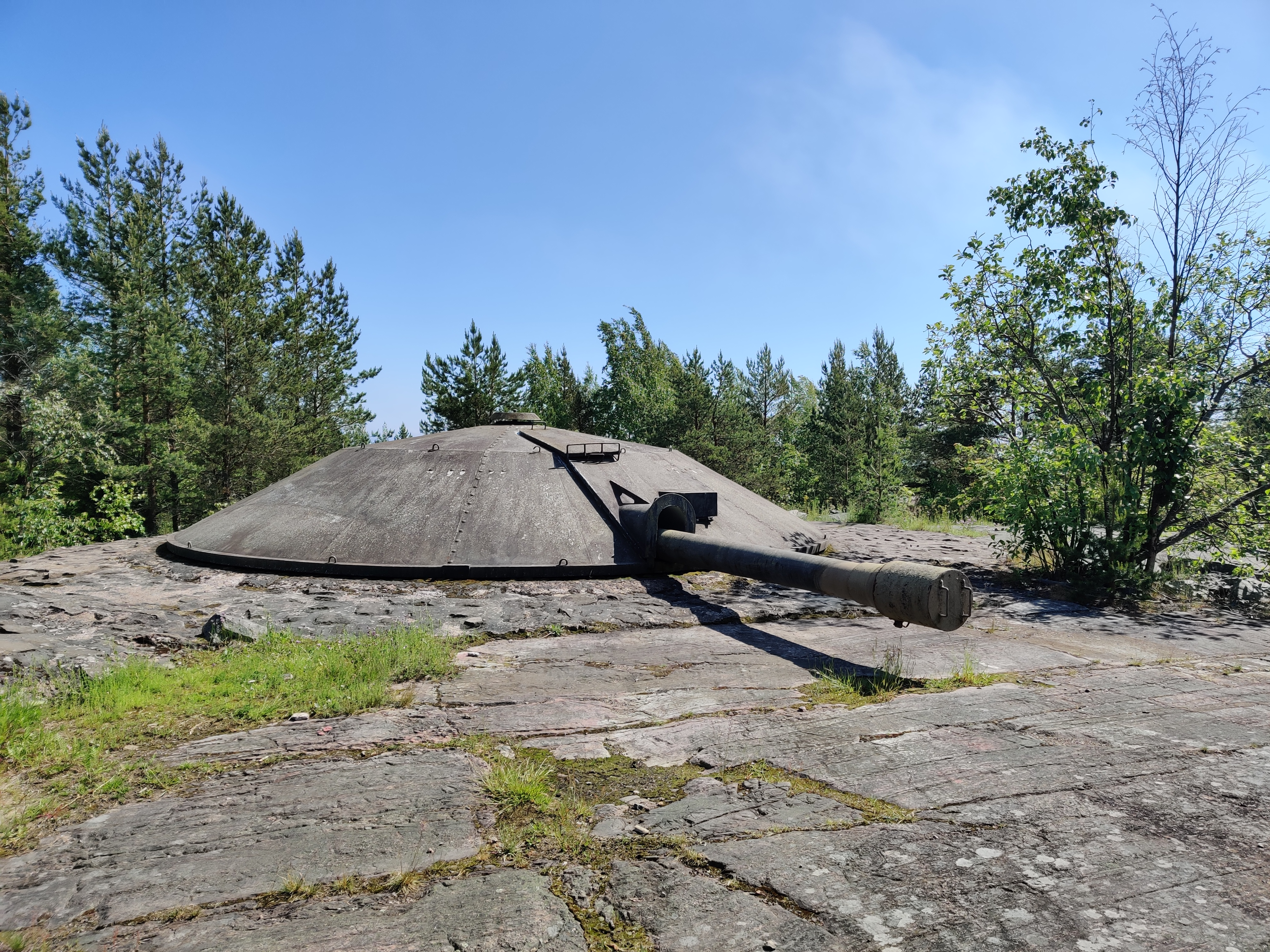
152 50 Tampella

Already toward the end of the World War II the Tampella company was ordered to construct new gun barrels for 152/45 C guns. Due to the end of the war this did not happen, but in the early 1950s funds became available for modernizing the guns. The Tampella barrel was longer than the original at 50 calibers and it had different, progressive rifling with 48 1.25 millimetres (0.049 in) deep grooves instead of the original constant 38 1.0 millimetre (0.039 in) deep grooves. Due to these changes the modernized gun could not use the ammunition of the original guns and new ammunition was developed for it using cased charges. The maximum range of the modernized gun was 25 kilometres (16 mi). The new barrels were also equipped with muzzle brakes. The new guns were given the designation 152 50 T and they started equipping coastal batteries in 1959. A total of 29 guns were converted. In 1960s concern for the vulnerability of fixed guns against napalm led to adding a protective metal cupola for the guns. An overpressurization system was also fitted. The cupola was built of thin metal and provided only very limited armour protection against small shrapnel. Smaller changes to the gun mounting were also made, including replacing the recoil springs. The modernized guns replaced older 152/45 C guns but some original models remained in less important positions. The Bolax battery was unique in that the cupola armour was fitted but the guns themselves were not modernized. By the 1980s the 152 50 T was in turn being replaced with the 130 53 TK and all were withdrawn from service by 2003.

== Estonian use ==
Estonia used the 152 mm cannon as railway artillery on an armored train in its Armored Train Regiment.

== Ammunition ==
Early ammunition was of Fixed QF type while later ammunition was of Separate QF. The projectiles weighed 41.4 kg (91 lb) and the charge weighed 12 kg (26 lb).

The gun was able to fire:

- Armor Piercing
- Chemical
- Common
- High Explosive
- Illumination
- Incendiary
- SAP
- Shrapnel

== Photo gallery ==
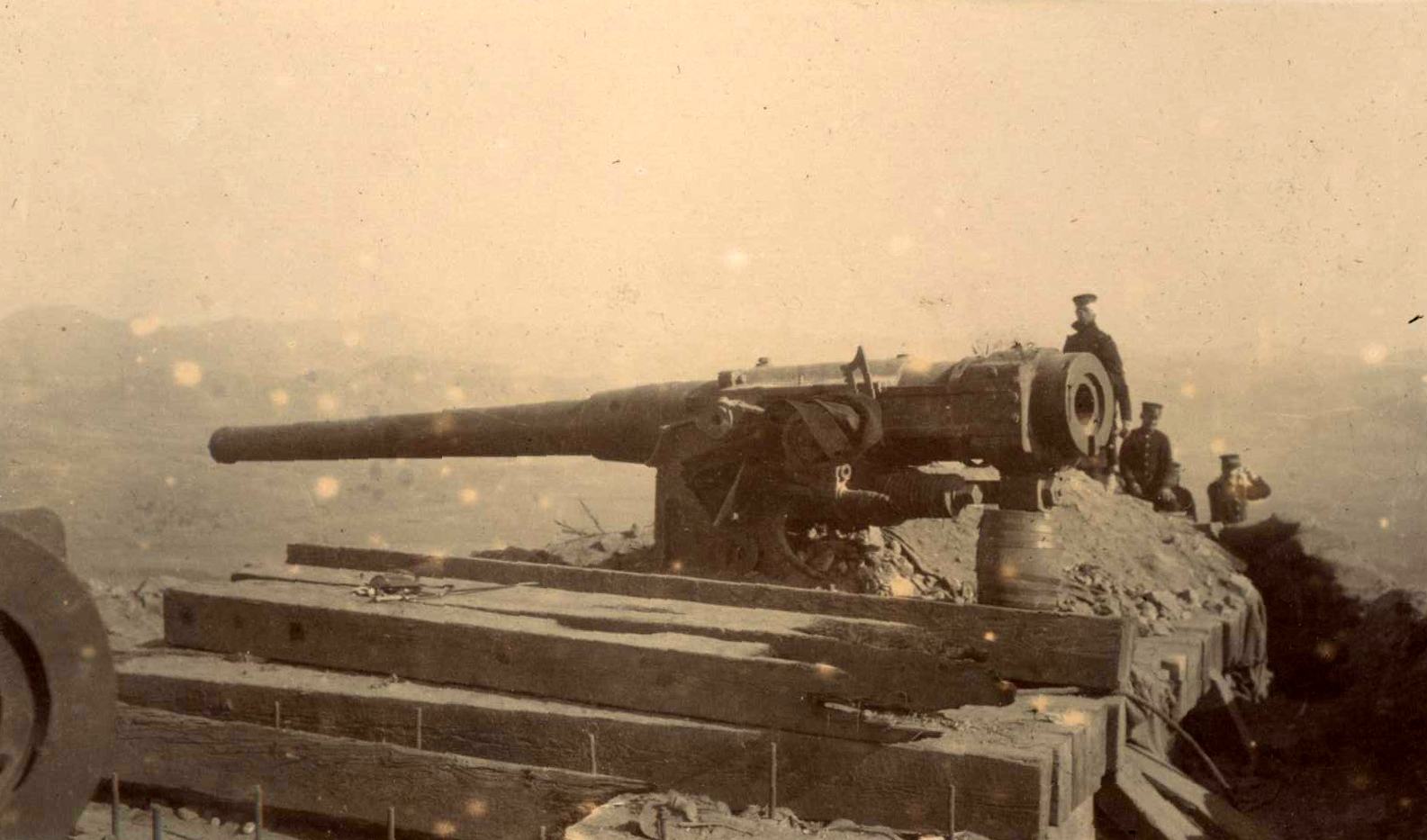
A gun at Dalny captured by the Japanese.

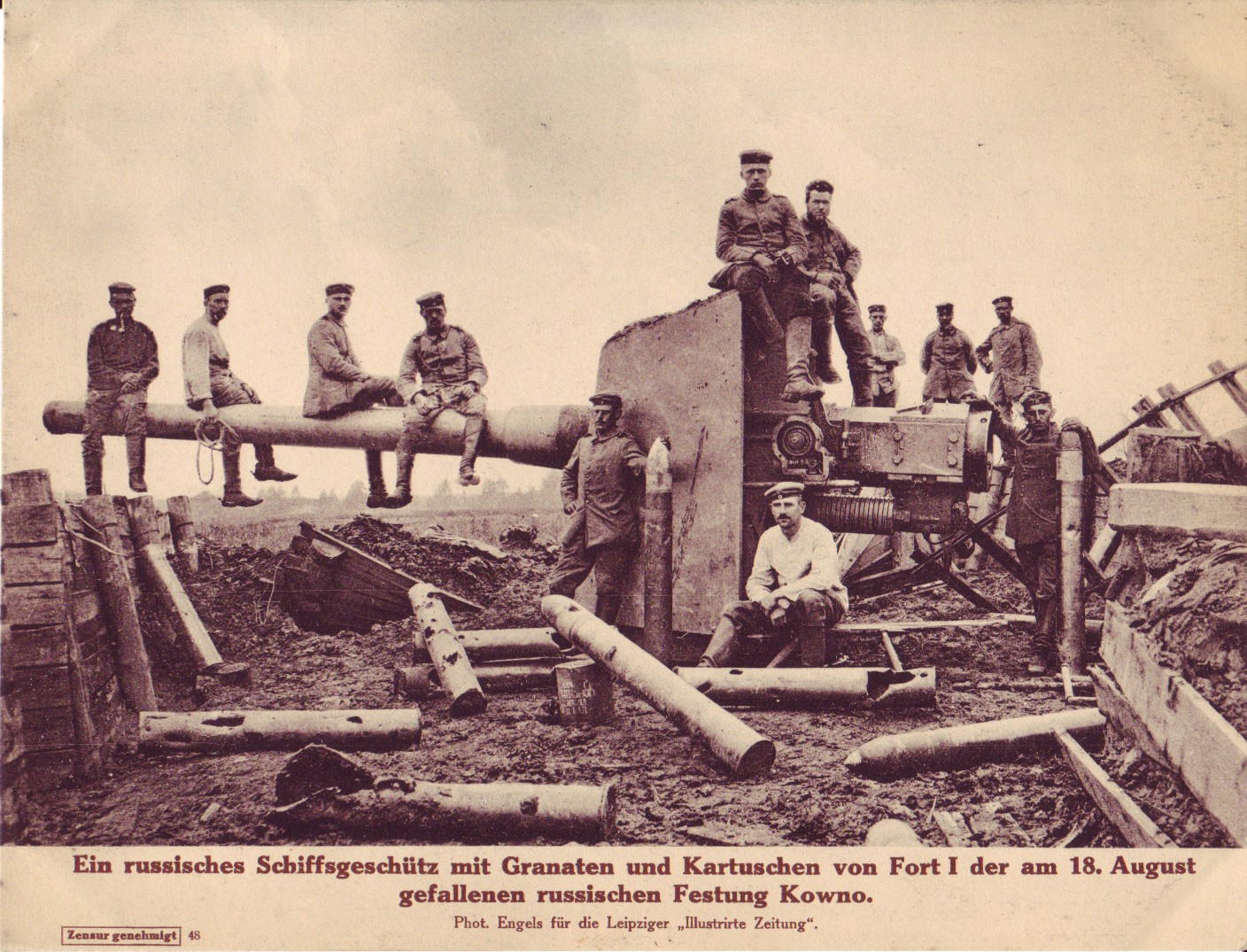
A gun captured by the Germans at Kaunas Fort (now Lithuania).

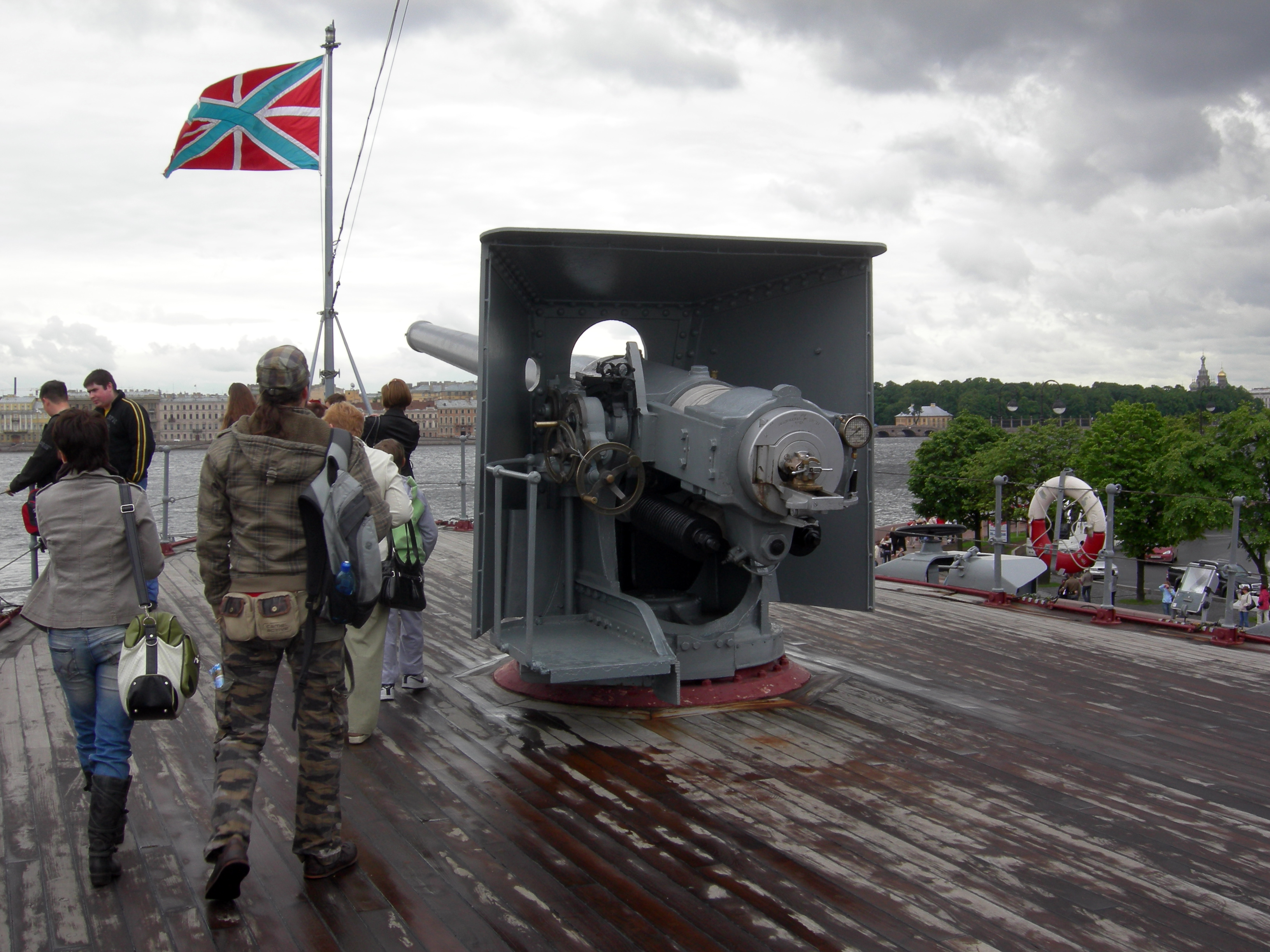
Forward gun on the Cruiser Aurora that fired the first shot of the Bolshevik Revolution.

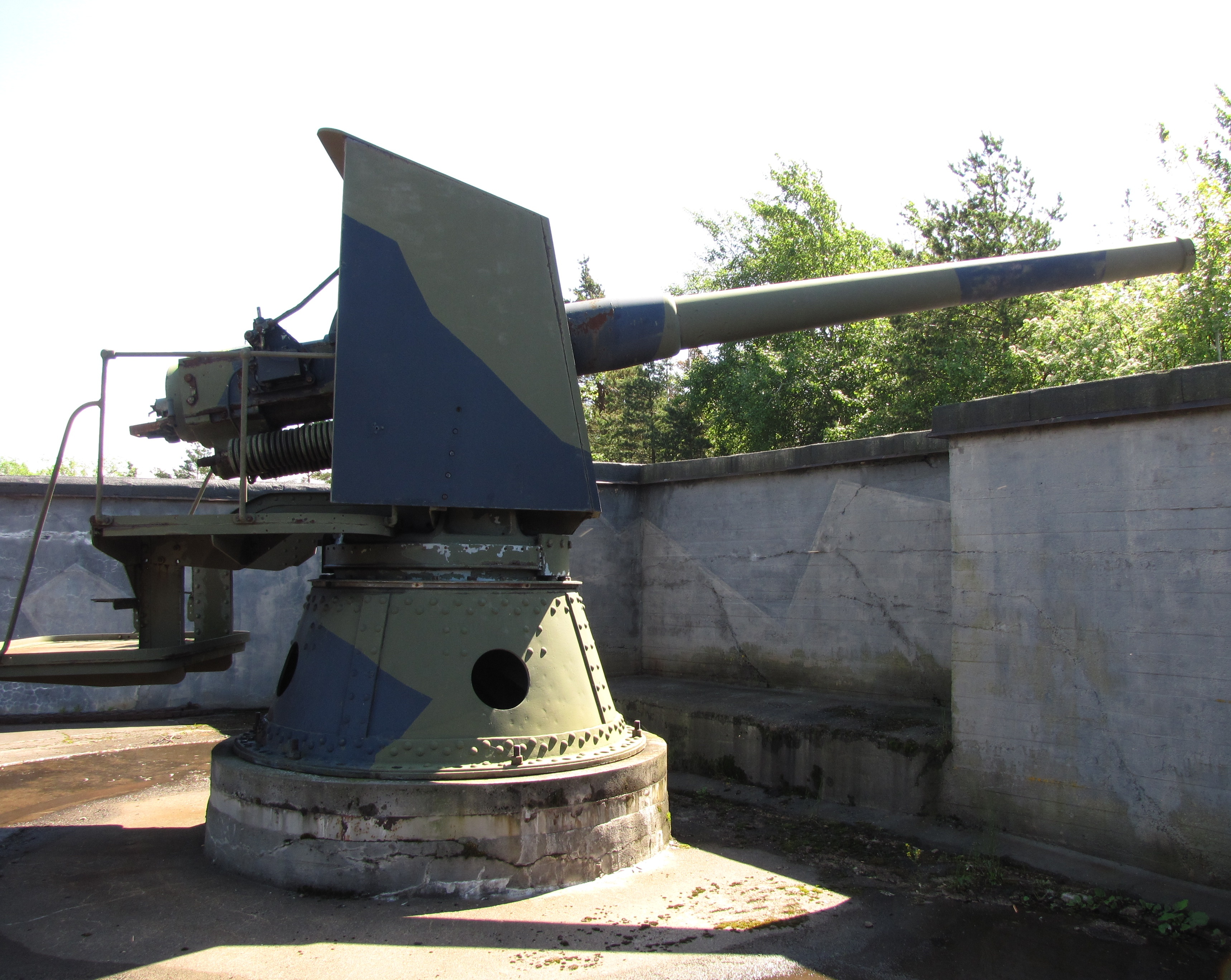
152 mm 45 caliber Pattern 1892 coastal gun on Kuivasaari Island. Manufactured by the Obukhov State Plant in 1896, serial number 30.

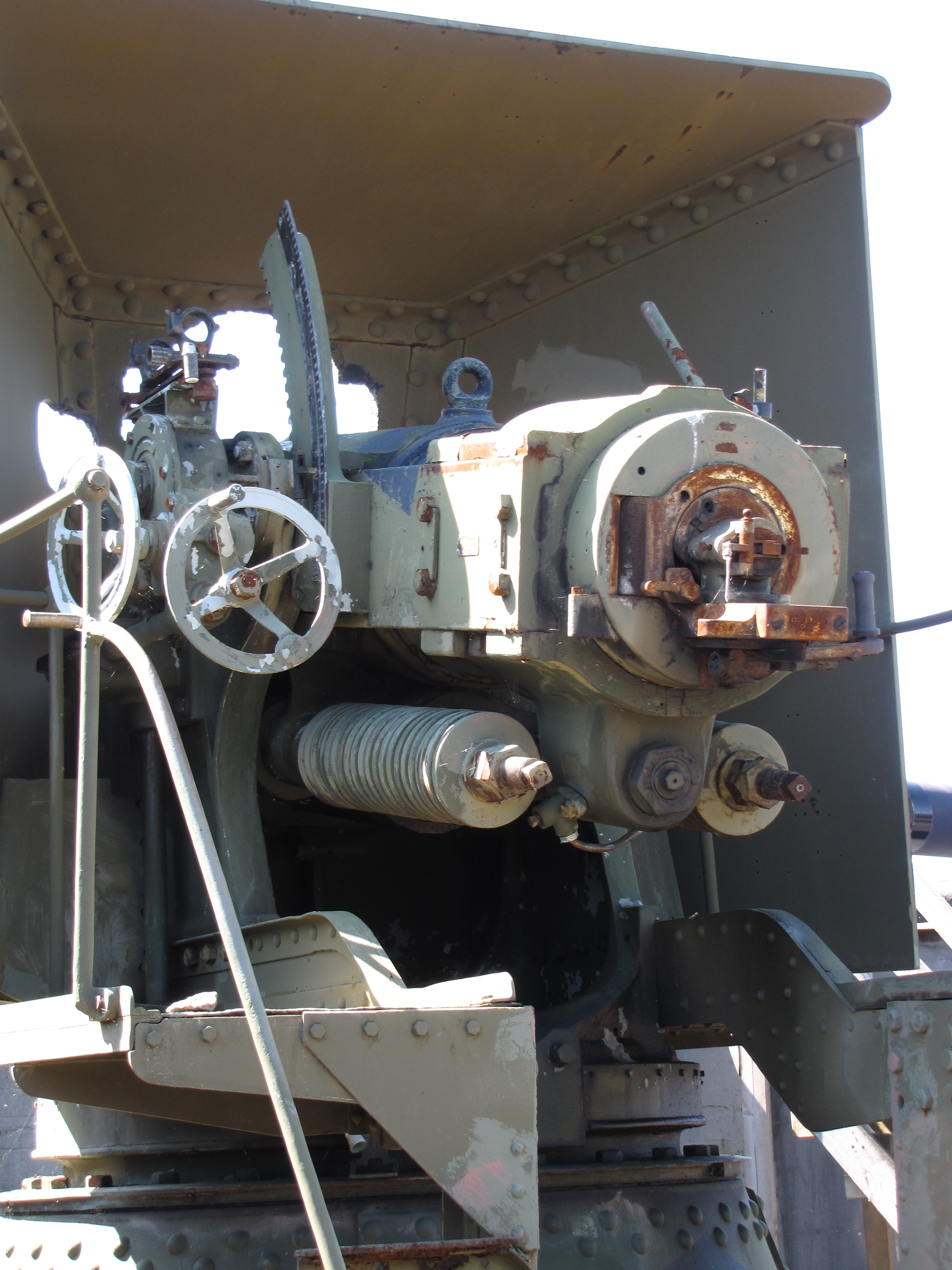
The breech of the same gun.

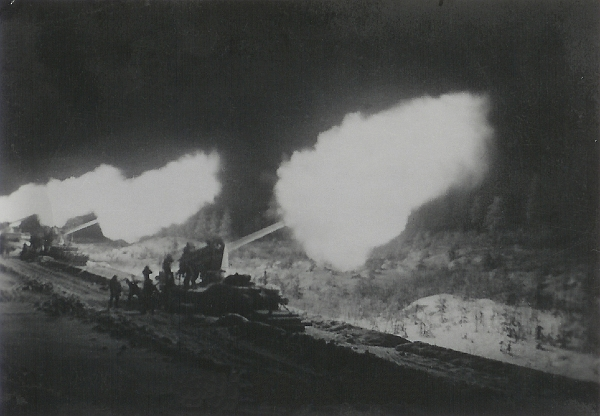
Finnish railway artillery at night near Vanozero in Karelia during the Continuation War.
