= Order of the October Revolution =

1967–1991 Soviet award

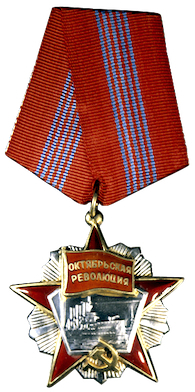
- Order of the October Revolution, awarded from 1967 to 1991
- Type: Single-grade order
- Awarded for: "Services furthering communism or the state, or in enhancing the defences of the Soviet Union"
- Country: Soviet Union
- Presented by: the Soviet Union
- Eligibility: Soviet and foreign citizens and institutions, including military units and administrative areas
- Status: No longer awarded
- Established: 31 October 1967
- First award: 4 November 1967
- Final award: 21 December 1991

Highlights
- Total: 106,462
- Ribbon of the Order of the October Revolution

Precedence
- Next (higher): Order of Lenin
- Next (lower): Order of the Red Banner

The Order of the October Revolution (Russian: Орден Октябрьской Революции, Orden Oktyabr'skoy Revolyutsii) was instituted on 31 October 1967, in time for the 50th anniversary of the October Revolution. It was conferred upon individuals or groups for services furthering communism or the state, or in enhancing the defenses of the Soviet Union, military and civil. It is the second-highest Soviet order, after the Order of Lenin.

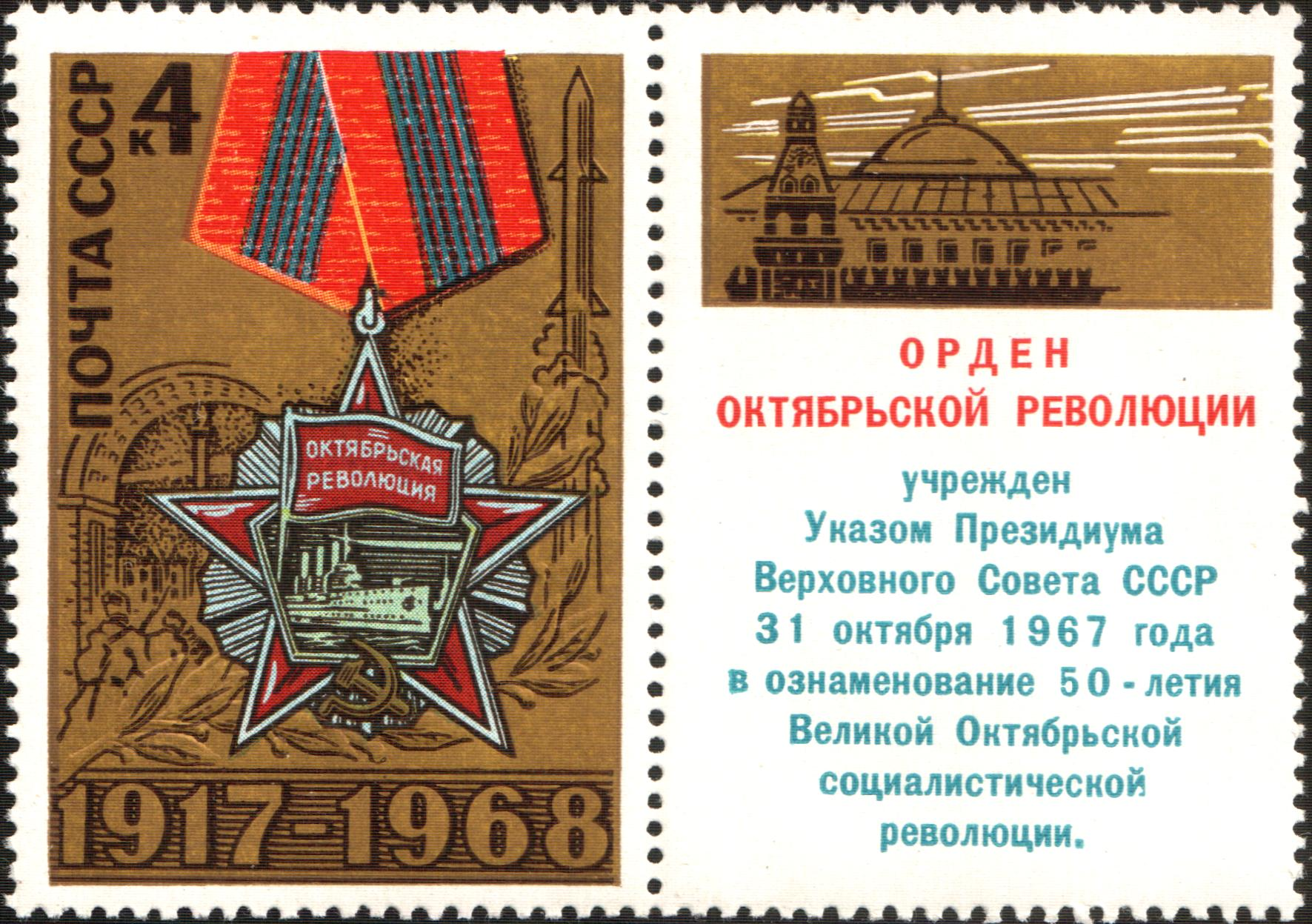
1967 USSR commemorative stamp

The insignia of the Order consisted of a badge, which was a red star with golden rays between the arms; at the centre was a pentagon bearing the image of the cruiser Aurora participating in the October Revolution. Above this was a red flag bearing the words "October Revolution" in Russian. A Hammer and Sickle emblem was placed at the bottom. The badge was worn on the left chest with a red ribbon bearing five blue stripes at the centre.

Aurora was herself awarded the Order, the only ship ever to have received the award. Military units and institutions receiving the award applied the order name to their title upon its reception.
