= Japanese cruiser Tsugaru =

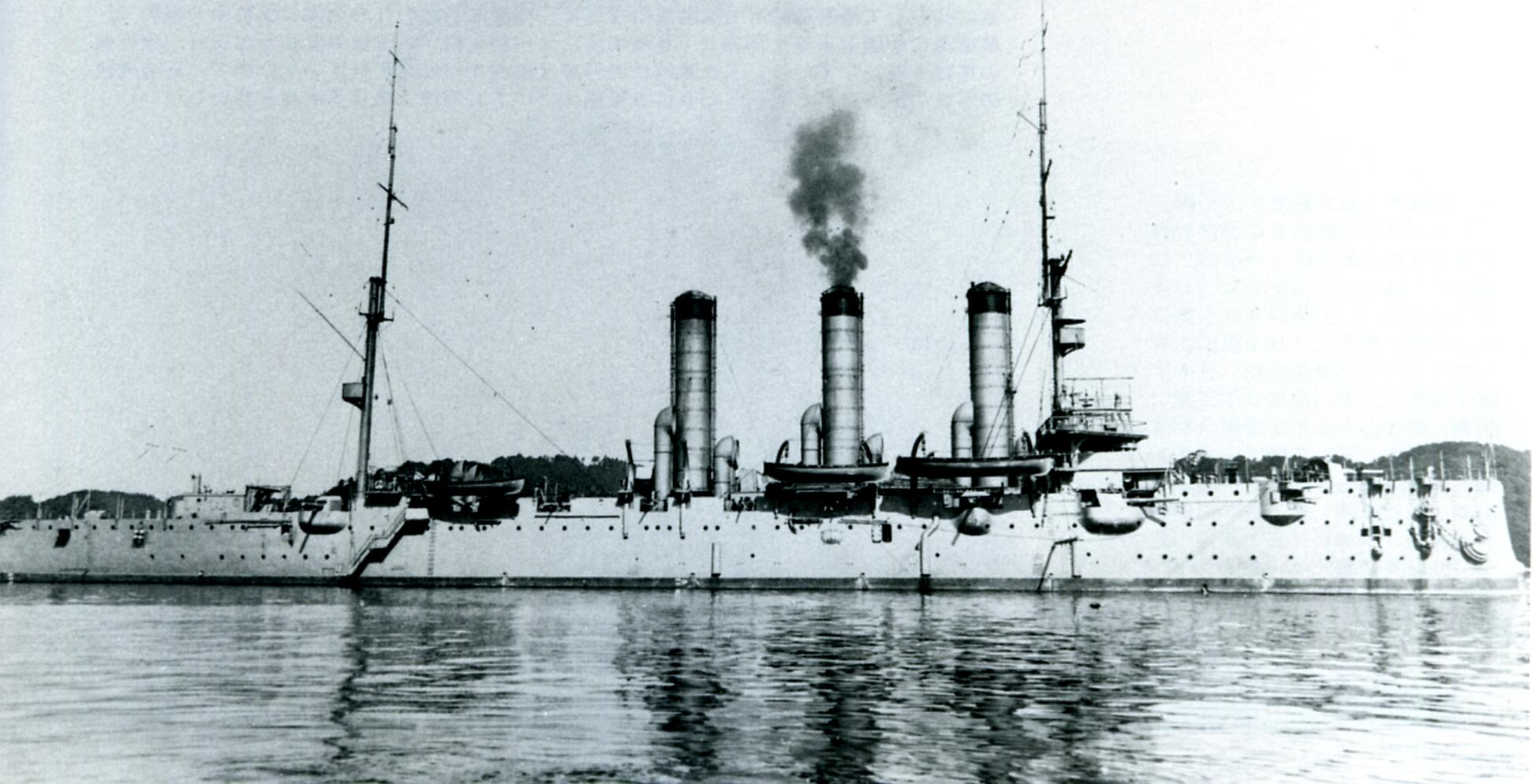
- Tsugaru in 1918

History

Japan
- Name: Tsugaru
- Namesake: Tsugaru Strait
- Ordered: 1895 Fiscal Year
- Builder: Admiralty Shipyard, Russia
- Laid down: 1 December 1895
- Launched: 26 August 1899
- Completed: 2 November 1901
- Acquired: by Japan as prize of war, 1905
- Commissioned: 22 August 1908
- Stricken: 1 April 1922
- Fate: Scuttled, 27 May 1924

General characteristics
- Type: Protected cruiser
- Displacement: 6,600 long tons (6,706 t) normal; 6,932 long tons (7,043 t) full load
- Length: 126 m (413 ft 5 in) w/l
- Beam: 16.8 m (55 ft 1 in)
- Draught: 6.4 m (21 ft 0 in)
- Propulsion: 2 shaft reciprocating VTE engines; 24 boilers; 11,610 hp (8,660 kW)
- Speed: 20 knots (23 mph; 37 km/h), 21.85 knots (25.14 mph; 40.47 km/h) (trial)
- Range: 3,700 nmi (6,900 km) at 10 kn (12 mph; 19 km/h)
- Complement: 514
- Armament: 8 × 152 mm (6 in) guns; 12 × 80 mm (3.1 in) guns; 3 × 450 mm (18 in) torpedo tubes
- Armour: Deck: 50–62 mm (2.0–2.4 in); Conning tower: 150 mm (5.9 in)

Tsugaru (津軽) was a protected cruiser of the Imperial Japanese Navy, acquired as a prize of war during the Russo-Japanese War from the Imperial Russian Navy, where she was originally known as Pallada. The cruisers Aurora and Diana were her sister ships.

== Background ==
Pallada was built by the Admiralty Shipyard in St Petersburg, Russia for the Imperial Russian Navy. As the lead ship of the Pallada class, she was one of the most modern cruisers in the Russian navy when assigned to the Russian Far East squadron based at Port Arthur, Manchuria.

With the start of the Russo-Japanese War in 1904, Pallada was trapped at Port Arthur, and subsequently sunk by Japanese artillery during the Siege of Port Arthur on 8 December 1904.

== Service record ==
After the capture of Port Arthur by the Japanese, the wreck of Pallada was raised, repaired, and commissioned into the Imperial Japanese Navy as the second-class cruiser Tsugaru on 22 August 1908. Her new name came from the Tsugaru Strait between Honshū and Hokkaidō.

After commissioning into the Japanese navy, Tsugaru was used almost exclusively for training duties, especially for mechanical systems training, and rarely left Japanese home waters.

On 1 April 1920, Tsugaru was re-classified as a minelayer with 300 mines. She was removed from the active list on 1 April 1922, and scuttled with explosive charges in the Pacific Ocean off Yokosuka, Japan, on 27 May 1924.

The cruiser Tsugaru should not be confused with the Pacific War era minelayer of the same name.

== Gallery ==
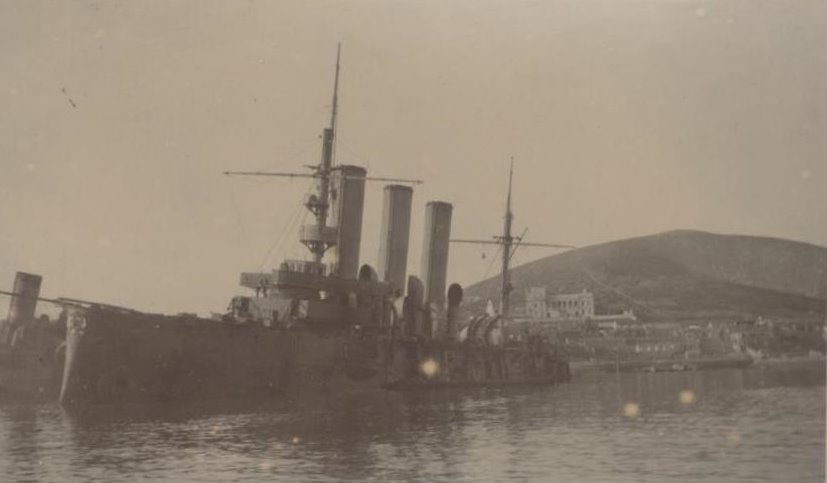
Pallada sunk in Port Arthur

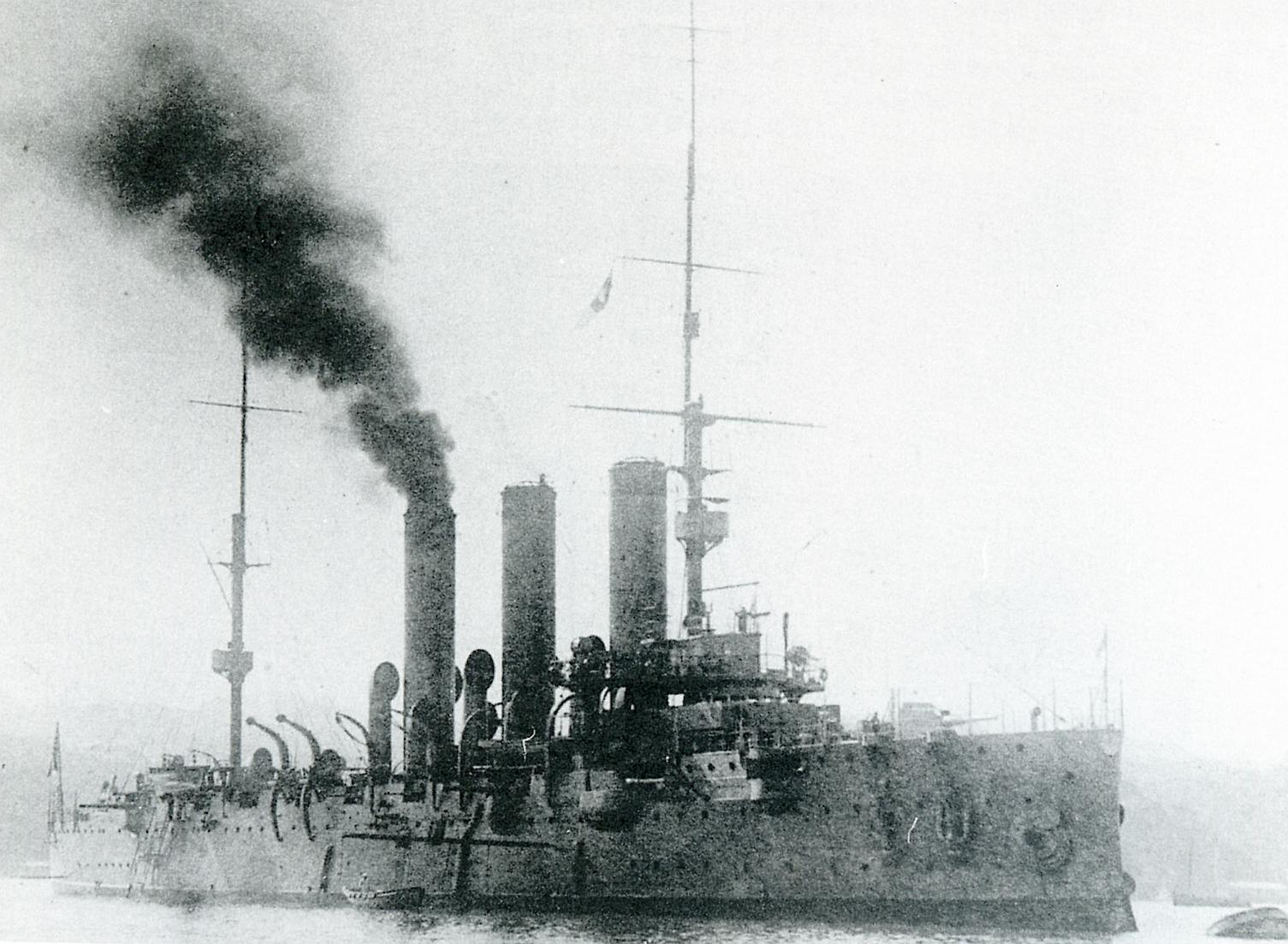
Tsugaru in 1912

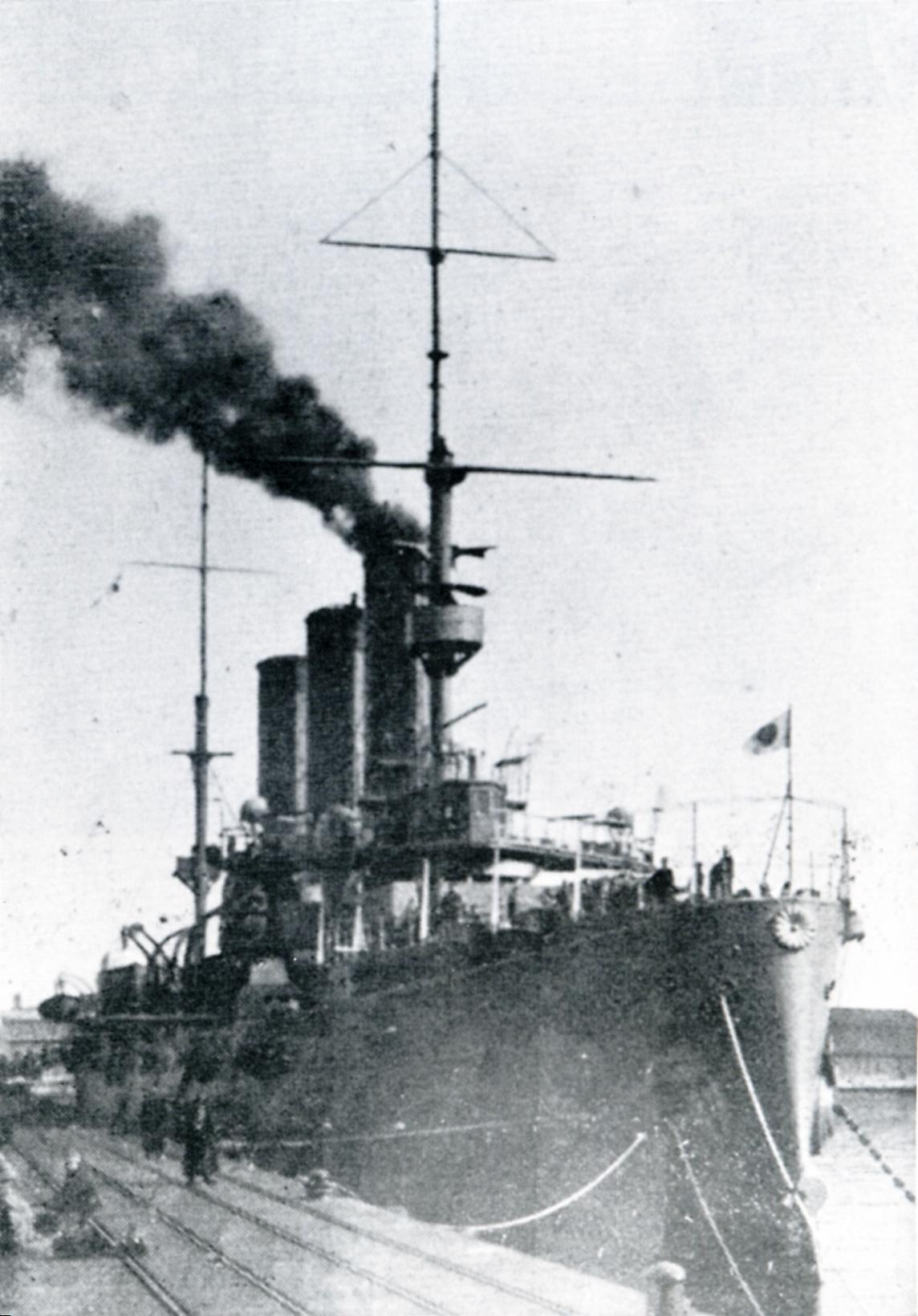
Tsugaru in 1914
