= Oskar Enqvist =

Russian admiral (1849–1912)

Oskar Wilhelm Enqvist
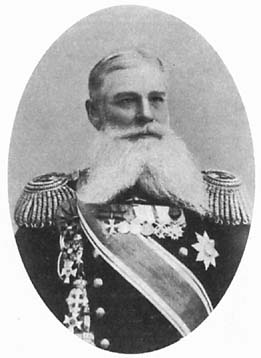
- Born: October 28, 1849; Gatchina, Russia
- Died: March 3, 1912 (aged 62); Kronstadt, St. Petersburg, Russia
- Military career
- Allegiance: Russia
- Branch: Imperial Russian Navy
- Service years: 1869–1907
- Rank: Vice Admiral
- Conflicts: Russo-Japanese War

Oskar Wilhelm Enqvist (Russian: О́скар Адо́льфович Э́нквист, Oskar Adolfovich Enkvist; 28 October 1849 – 3 March 1912) was a Finnish-Swedish admiral in the Imperial Russian Navy, noted for his role in the Russo-Japanese War of 1904–1905.

== Youth and early career ==
Born to Captain Adolf Frederik Enqvist of ethnic Finno-Swedish ethnicity and Lutheran faith. Enqvist was a classmate of future Admiral Nikolai Nebogatov at the Naval Cadet Corps in 1866. He was promoted to gardemarin in 1869 and graduated as a midshipman in 1871. He served in the Russian Baltic Fleet from 1871 to 1874, and was promoted to lieutenant on 30 August 1874. From 15 June 1884 to 24 October 1886, he was an officer on the gunboat Sivuch on which he led an expedition to the Far East. On 13 April 1886 he was promoted to captain 2nd rank, while still on his expedition.

On 28 October 1887 he returned to Russia. Enqvist was transferred to the cruiser Pamiat Azova as executive officer on 9 April 1888, on which he made a second voyage to the Far East from 1890 to 1891. On board this ship was the Tsarevich Nicholas II on his tour of the various countries of Asia.

== Senior officer ==
From 25 May 1891 to 21 September 1893 Enqvist commanded on the gunboat Bobr and supervised hydrological studies off the shores of Korea. While on this voyage, on 6 December 1894, he promoted to the rank of captain 1st rank. On the return from this voyage, Enqvist was appointed captain of the training cruiser Gerzog Edinburgski on 5 June 1895, and commanded this vessel until 7 June 1899. On 6 December 1901, Enqvist was promoted to rear admiral. With this rank, he became commandant of the port and city of Nikolaïev on 9 September 1902 to 26 April 1904.

== Russo-Japanese War ==
During the Russo-Japanese War, Enqvist, largely through the political patronage of his cousin Theodor Avellan, Chief-of-Staff of the Russian Admiralty and Navy Minister, was appointed as commander of the First Cruiser Division of the Second Pacific Squadron, over numerous officers with higher seniority. He made the new cruiser Oleg as his flagship. Vice admiral Zinovy Rozhestvensky viewed Enqvist as a political opportunist, and refused to allow him an independent command, but instead forced him to sail with the main force around the southern end of the African continent.

During the Battle of Tsushima on 27–28 May 1905, in order to avoid capture or destruction by the Imperial Japanese Navy, Enqvist announced to his officers at the end of the first day of the battle that he had decided to flee rather than to continue the battle or to attempt to reach Vladivostok. Over the objections of his officers, Enqvist ordered the Oleg south, together with the Aurora and Zhemchug to the neutral port of Manila, where he and his squadron were interned by the Americans until the end of the war.

== Retirement and death ==
After his return to Russia, he was released from service with the Russian Imperial Navy on November 10, 1907, with the rank of vice admiral. Oskar Wilhelm Enqvist died on March 3, 1912, in Kronstadt and was buried there.

== Honors ==
=== Imperial Russia decorations ===
- Order of St. Stanislaus 2nd degree, January 8, 1890
- Order of St. Anne 2nd degree 1892
- Order of St Vladimir 4th degree with bow, 1897.
- Order of St Vladimir 3rd degree, December 6, 1899.
- Order of St. Stanislaus 1st degree, January 1, 1904

=== Foreign distinctions ===
- Order of the Redeemer, Knight, 1866 (Greece)
- Order of the Sacred Treasure, 3rd class, 1891 (Japan)
- Order of the Red Eagle, 2nd class, 1897 (Prussia)
- Officer of the Legion of Honor, 1897 (France)
- Order of the Redeemer, Commander, 1899 (Greece)
- Order of Saints Maurice and Lazarus, Commander, 1900 (Italy)
- Order of the Rising Sun, 3rd degree, 1902 (Japan)
