= Russian cruiser Admiral Kornilov =

Russian ship (1887-1911)

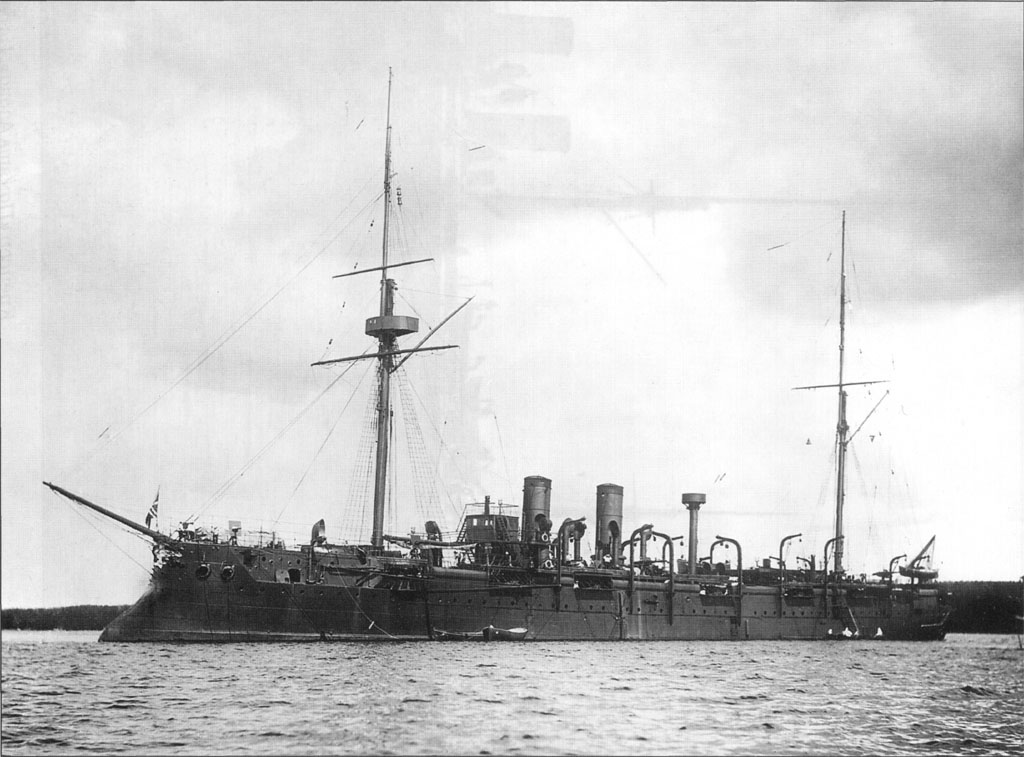
- Imperial Russian cruiser "Admiral Kornilov"

History

Russian Empire
- Name: Admiral Kornilov
- Builder: St. Nazaire, France
- Laid down: 1886
- Launched: 1887
- Commissioned: 1888
- Reclassified: Torpedo training ship, 1908
- Stricken: 1911

General characteristics
- Type: Protected cruiser
- Displacement: 5,863 long tons (5,957 t)
- Length: 113 m (370 ft 9 in)
- Beam: 14.8 m (48 ft 7 in)
- Draught: 7.8 m (25 ft 7 in)
- Propulsion: 2 horizontal triple-expansion steam engines; 8 boilers; 5,977 ihp (4,457 kW); 2 shafts; 1000 tons of coal
- Speed: 17.6 knots (32.6 km/h; 20.3 mph)
- Complement: 479
- Armament: From 1888 : 14 × 6-inch (152 mm)/40 guns; 6 × 3-pounders/47 mm (1.9 in); 10 × 1-pounders/37 mm (1.5 in); 6 × 15 in (381 mm) torpedo tubes; After 1904/05 refit : 10 × 6-inch (152 mm) guns
- Armour: Deck:1–2.5 in (25–64 mm); Command tower: 3 in (76 mm)

Admiral Kornilov was a protected cruiser of the Russian Imperial Navy. She was named for Vice-Admiral Vladimir Alexeyevich Kornilov.

The ship was laid down in 1886 and launched in 1887 at St. Nazaire in France. She was commissioned in 1888. Admiral Kornilov was 113 metres (371 ft) long and 14.8 metres (49 ft) wide, had a draught of 7.8 metres (26 ft) and featured a large ram bow. She displaced 5,863 tonnes (5,770 long tons). The armament consisted of ten 6-inch (152 mm)/40?(35) guns, six 3-pounders (47 mm) and ten 1-pounders (37 mm) plus six 15-inch (381 mm) torpedo tubes. During a refit in 1904/05 the main armament was changed to ten 6-inch (152 mm) guns. The deck armor was between 1 and 2.5 inches (25 and 64 mm), the armor at the command tower was 3 inches (76 mm). Two horizontal triple-expansion steam engines with eight boilers gave her 5,977 ihp and a top speed of 17.6 knots (32.6 km/h). She had two shafts and a bunker capacity of 1,000 tons of coal. The crew numbered 479 men.

Admiral Kornilov was unique to the Russian Navy but resembled the large protected cruisers Tage and Amiral Cécille built at the same time for the French Navy. These were unusually long cruisers at the time, although surpassed in 1892 by the British Blake class.

The ship was used as a torpedo training ship from 1908 and was stricken from the active list in 1911.

== Bibliography ==
- Budzbon, Przemysław (1985). "Russia". In Gray, Randal (ed.). Conway's All the World's Fighting Ships 1906–1921. Annapolis, Maryland: Naval Institute Press. pp. 291–325. ISBN 0-85177-245-5.
- Campbell, N. J. M. (1979). "Russia". In Chesneau, Roger & Kolesnik, Eugene M. (eds.). Conway's All the World's Fighting Ships 1860–1905. New York: Mayflower Books. pp. 170–217. ISBN 0-8317-0302-4.
