= Pallada-class cruiser =

1899 class of Russian protected cruisers

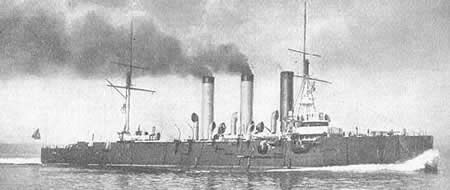
- Pallada underway

Class overview
- Builders: New Admiralty Shipyard, St Petersburg, Russia
- Operators: Imperial Russian Navy; Red Fleet; Soviet Navy; Imperial Japanese Navy; Russian Navy
- Preceded by: Svetlana
- Succeeded by: Varyag
- Built: 1895–1903
- In commission: 1902–1922
- Completed: 3
- Lost: 1
- Scrapped: 1
- Preserved: 1

General characteristics (as built)
- Type: Protected cruiser
- Displacement: 6,657–6,897 long tons (6,764–7,008 t)
- Length: 416 ft (126.8 m)
- Beam: 55 ft (16.76 m)
- Draft: 21 ft (6.4 m)
- Installed power: 24 × Belleville boilers; 11,971–13,100 ihp (8,927–9,769 kW)
- Propulsion: 3 × shafts, 3 × triple-expansion steam engines
- Speed: 19 knots (35 km/h; 22 mph)
- Complement: 571–81 officers and crewmen
- Armament: 8 × single 6 in (152 mm) guns; 24 × single 75 mm (3 in) guns; 8 × single 37 mm (1.5 in) guns; 3 × single 15 in (381 mm) submerged torpedo tubes
- Armor: Deck: 2–3 in (51–76 mm); Conning tower: 6 in (152 mm)

The Pallada-class cruisers (often known in Russia as "Diana-type protected cruisers", Russian: Бронепалубные крейсера типа «Диана») were a group of three protected cruisers built for the Imperial Russian Navy (IRN) in the late 1890s. One ship of the class, Aurora, is still crewed by the Russian Navy, and maintained as a museum ship.

== Background ==
The Pallada cruisers were built in the New Admiralty Shipyard in Saint Petersburg to reinforce the Baltic Fleet. However, the cruisers were intended to operate on commerce raiding operations worldwide, especially in the Far East. Initially the Imperial Russian Navy looked at foreign designs, including the Royal Navy′s Apollo class and then the Astraea class before deciding to proceed with a domestic design. Although the armor protection of the Pallada class was still light, it represented a significant improvement over preceding Russian cruiser designs.

The orders for Pallada and Diana were placed in December 1895 and for Aurora in June 1897. However, due to the very long construction period required for these vessels they were already obsolete upon entry into service. As part of this same construction program, the Russian Navy had received cruisers of similar size from abroad (Varyag, Askold, Bogatyr), which were delivered between January 1901 and August 1902, and which were superior to Pallada class in several aspects, including their maximum speed of 23 knots (43 km/h; 26 mph).

== Design ==
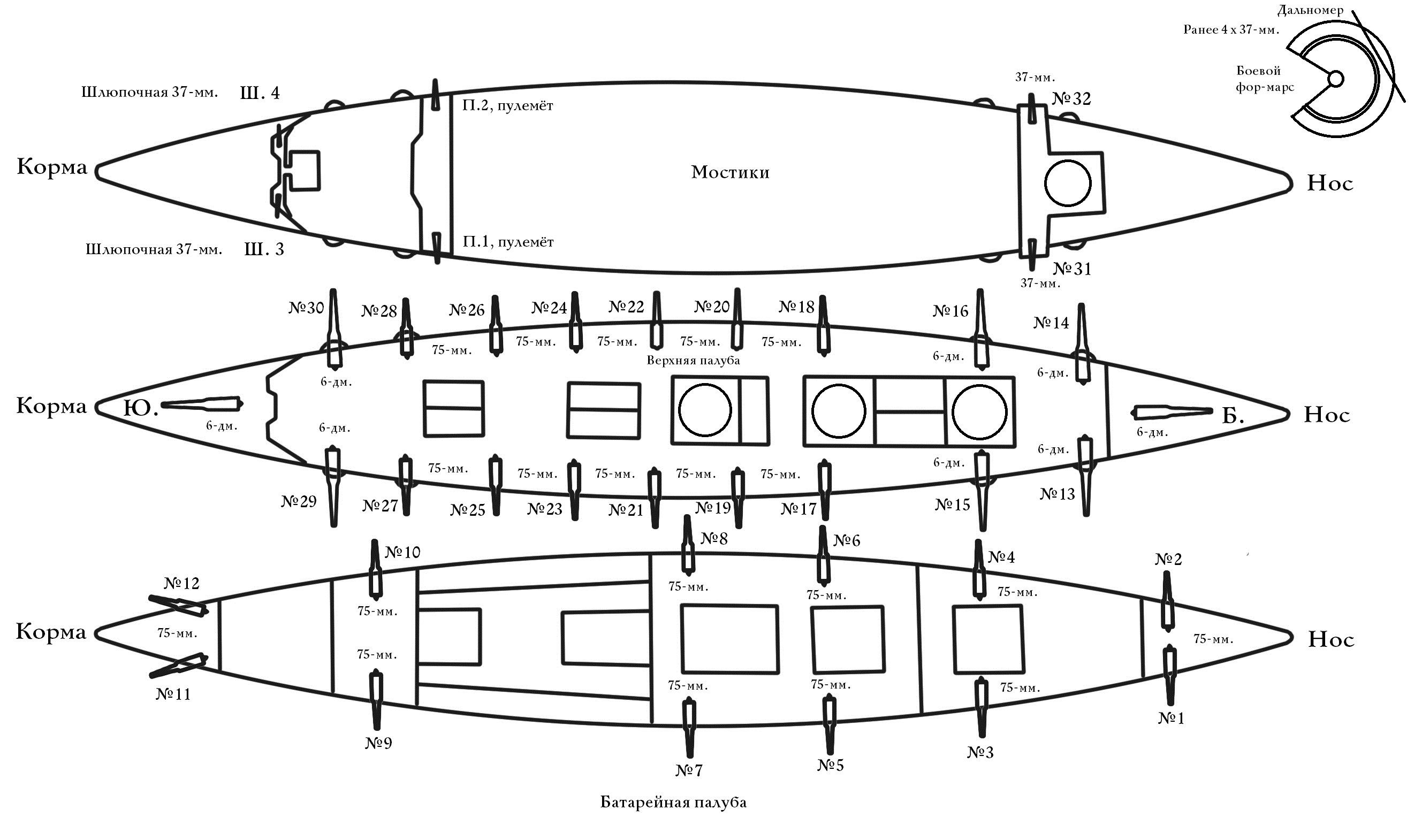
The armament of the Cruiser Aurora.

The Pallada-class cruisers had a displacement of 6,731 tons (standard) or 6,932 tons (maximum), with a length of 126 metres (413 ft), beam of 16.8 metres (55 ft) and draft of 6.4 metres (21 ft). Powered by three triple-expansion steam engines with a total of 13,000 horsepower (9,700 kW), they had attained speed of 19 knots (35 km/h; 22 mph). The ships had a range of 3,700 nautical miles (6,900 km; 4,300 mi) with a coal stock of 972 tons and 10 knots (19 km/h; 12 mph) cruising speed. The deck armor was 50–62 mm (2.0–2.4 in) thick, and the command post had 150 mm (5.9 in) armor. The crew numbered 578 men.

The Pallada-class cruisers were armed with eight 152 mm 45 caliber Pattern 1892 guns, which was one of the best Russian guns at the time. These and the twenty-four 75-mm guns as secondary armament were Russian variants of the French Schneider et Cie Canet guns. The ships also were equipped with eight 37-mm Hotchkiss cannons and three 380-mm torpedo tubes, along with two Baranowski 63.5-mm-L / 19 landing guns.

== Ships in class ==
Soon after her commissioning at the end of 1901 Pallada and Diana were sent to Port Arthur for use in the Russian Pacific Squadron. All three ships of the Pallada class were used in combat during the Russo-Japanese War of 1904-1905, but without significant success. Pallada was blockaded within the confines of Port Arthur and was sunk at anchor. Diana broke out of the blockade in an attempt to reach home, but was interned in Saigon. Aurora sailed with the Second Pacific Squadron, which was annihilated at the Battle of Tsushima; Aurora escaped, but was interned at Manila.

After the war, Pallada was raised by the Japanese and commissioned into the Imperial Japanese Navy as the Japanese cruiser Tsugaru. In World War I, Diana and Aurora served with the Russian Baltic Fleet. Aurora subsequently achieved fame for firing the shot which is considered the start of the Russian October Revolution.
