= Russian cruiser Aurora =

Russian cruiser that participated in the October Revolution

Coordinates: 59°57′19″N 30°20′17″E

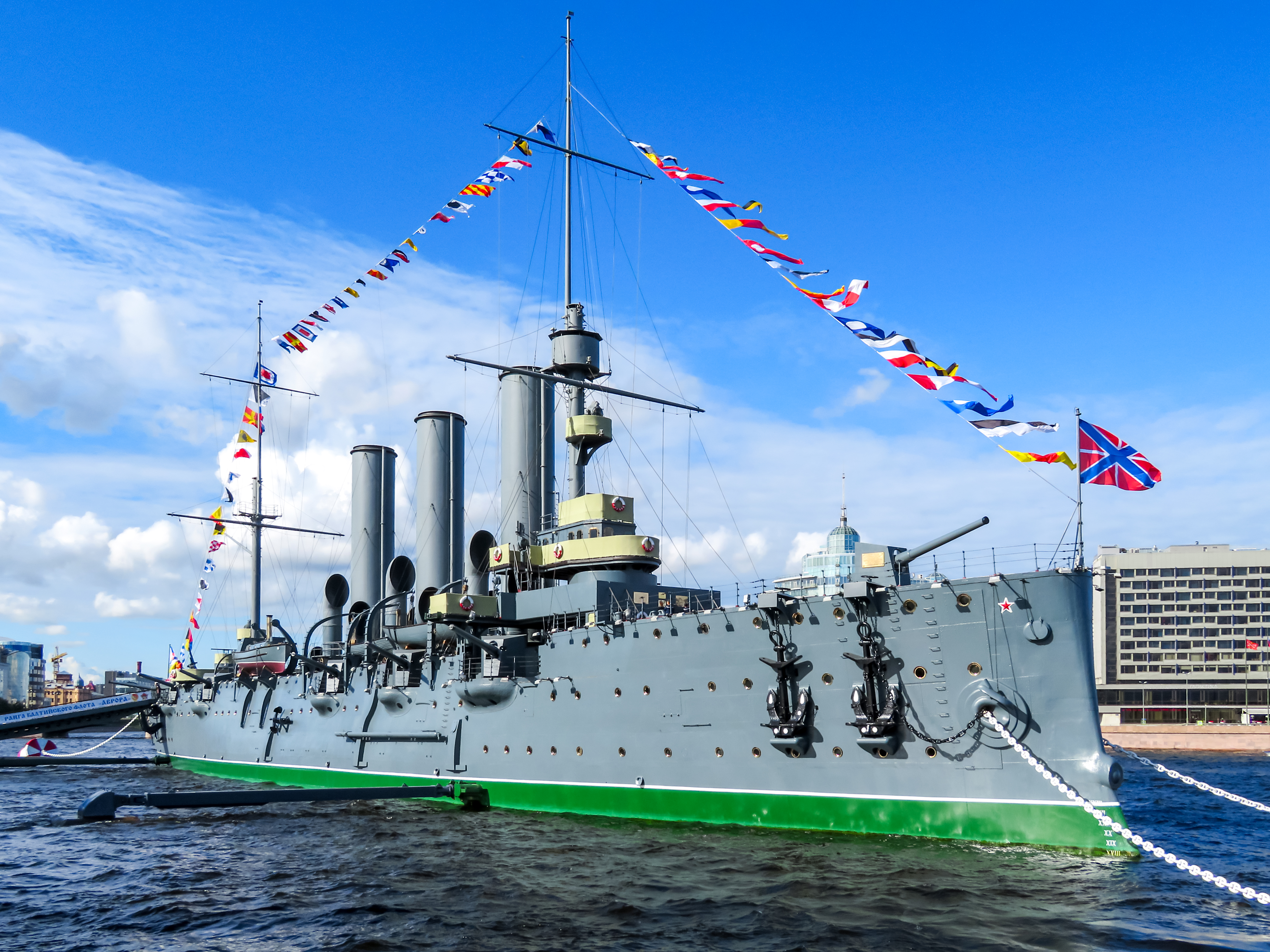
- Aurora, moored in Saint Petersburg, Russia, July 2022

History

→ → → Russian Empire → Soviet Union → Russia
- Name: Aurora
- Namesake: Aurora (mythology)
- Ordered: June 1896
- Builder: Admiralty Shipyard, Saint Petersburg
- Laid down: 23 May 1897
- Launched: 11 May 1900
- Completed: 10 July 1903
- Commissioned: 16 July 1903
- Decommissioned: 17 November 1948
- Honours and awards: Order of the October Revolution; Order of the Red Banner
- Fate: Museum ship since 1956
- Status: Ceremoniously commissioned
- Notes: Participated in: Dogger Bank incident (1904); Battle of Tsushima (1905); October Revolution (1917); Siege of Leningrad (1941–44)

General characteristics
- Class & type: Pallada-class protected cruiser
- Displacement: 6,731 t (6,625 long tons)
- Length: 126.8 m (416 ft 0 in)
- Beam: 16.8 m (55 ft 1 in)
- Draught: 7.3 m (23 ft 11 in)
- Installed power: 24 Belleville boilers; 11,610 ihp (8,660 kW)
- Propulsion: 3 shafts; 3 triple-expansion steam engines
- Speed: 19 knots (35 km/h; 22 mph)
- Range: 7,200 km (4,500 mi) at 10 knots (19 km/h; 12 mph)
- Complement: 590
- Armament: 1903: 8 × 152 mm (6 in) guns; 24 × 75 mm (3 in) guns; 8 × 37 mm guns; 3 × torpedo tubes (two underwater); 1917: 14 × 152 mm guns; 4 × 76.2 mm (3 in) AA guns; 1 × QF 2-pounder naval gun

Aurora (Russian: Авро́ра, romanized: Avrora, IPA: [ɐˈvrorə]) is a Russian protected cruiser, currently preserved as a museum ship in Saint Petersburg. Aurora was one of three Pallada-class cruisers, built in Saint Petersburg for service in the Pacific Ocean. All three ships of this class served during the Russo-Japanese War. Aurora survived the Battle of Tsushima and was interned under US protection in the Philippines, and eventually returned to the Baltic Fleet. Aurora is most famous for her actions during the October Revolution, where she reportedly fired the shot that signaled the beginning of the attack on the Winter Palace.

== Russo-Japanese War ==
Line-drawing of Aurora

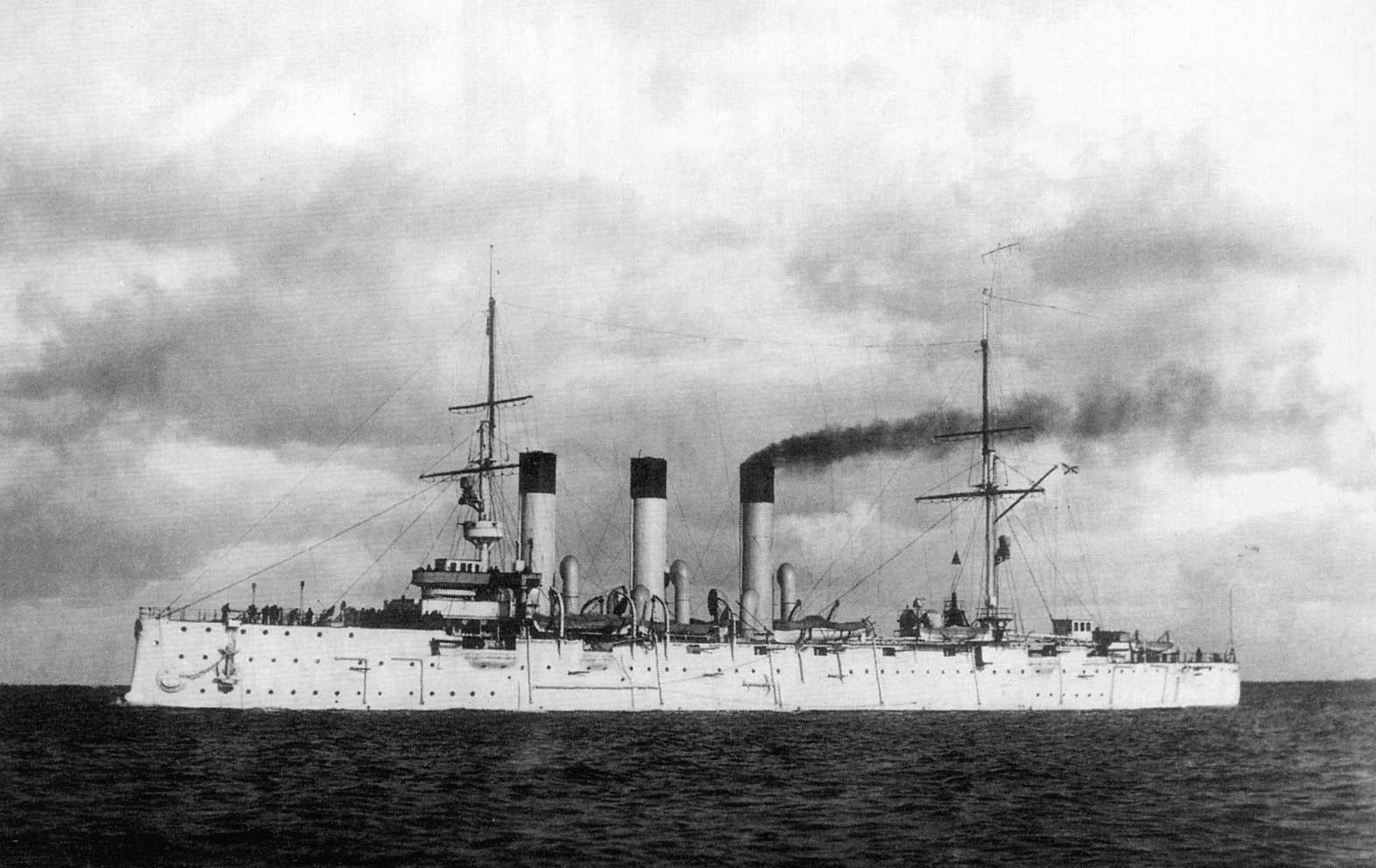
Aurora in 1903

Soon after completion, on 10 October 1903, Aurora departed Kronstadt as part of Admiral Virenius's "reinforcing squadron" for Port Arthur. While in the Red Sea, still en route to Port Arthur, the squadron was recalled to the Baltic Sea, under protest by Admiral Makarov, who specifically requested Admiral Virenius to continue his mission to Port Arthur. Only the seven destroyers of the reinforcing squadron were allowed to continue to the Far East.

After her detachment from the reinforcing squadron and her arrival back to home port, she underwent new refitting. After refitting, Aurora was ordered back to Port Arthur as part of the Russian Baltic Fleet. Aurora sailed as part of Admiral Oskar Enkvist's Cruiser Squadron whose flagship would be the protected cruiser Oleg, an element of Admiral Zinovy Rozhestvensky's Baltic Fleet. On the way to the Far East, Aurora received five hits, sustaining light damage from confused friendly fire, which killed the ship's chaplain and a sailor, in the Dogger Bank incident.

During the Battle of Tsushima Aurora was only lightly damaged. Despite this, the ship's captain, Evgeny Egoriev, was killed. At nightfall, Aurora along with Oleg, were attacked by torpedo boats and at 22:00 they gave up trying to proceed north and headed southwest. Once dawn arrived it was found that Zhemchug had retreated with the other two ships. Enkvist decided transfer his command to Aurora then take his ships to Manila and American internment. On the way to Manila, the ship's doctor managed to set up the ship's X-ray equipment and performed the first post battle X-rays in Russian naval history. Evgeny Egoriev was buried at sea on 3 June 1905.

== World War I, mutiny and revolution ==
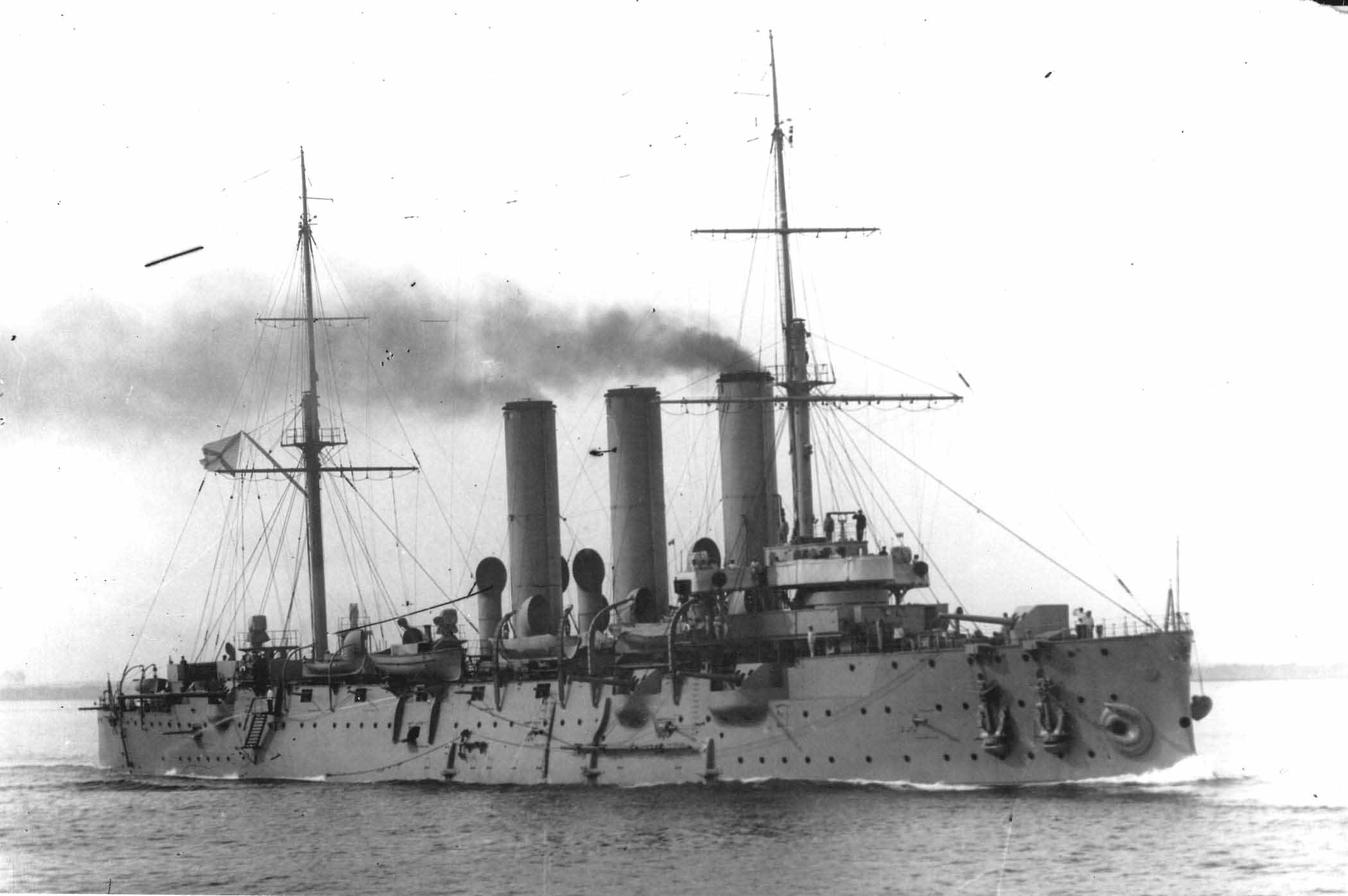
Aurora in 1910

During World War I, Aurora operated in the Baltic Sea performing patrols and shore bombardment tasks. In 1915, her armament was changed to fourteen 152 mm (6 in) guns. In late 1916 she was moved to Petrograd for repairs.

By late 1916, when Aurora arrived in Petrograd, conditions in the capital had deteriorated and the city was lawless and suffering from a cold winter and food shortages. Dissatisfaction with the Tsar was approaching a breaking point.

During the February Revolution, a significant number of the enlisted men had become sympathetic with, or had outright joined, the Bolsheviks. This led to increasing tensions between the officer class—who were generally Tsarists—and the enlisted men.

Tensions came to a head after officers fired their pistols at the enlisted men in an attempt to restore order. The crew captured the ship's captain, Mikhail Nikolsky, and ordered him to carry a red flag as a symbol of support for the Bolshevik cause. When he declined, he was shot and killed, as were an unknown number of the ship's officers.

A revolutionary committee was formed, and a new ship's captain was elected. The crew of the ship joined the Bolshevik cause, and Aurora became the first major Russian warship to fly the red Bolshevik flag.

On the eve of the October Revolution, the ship was assigned to dislodge loyalist military cadets from the Nikolayevsky Bridge. After carrying out that assignment, the ship fired the famous blank shot that, according to Russian lore, was the signal to begin the assault on the Winter Palace. It is for this action that the ship is best known and most closely identified in Russian culture.

In 1918 Aurora was relocated to the naval dockyard at Kronstadt and her new 6-inch guns were removed and installed on floating batteries, to be used by the Bolsheviks during the Russian Civil War.

== Second World War ==
In 1922, Aurora returned to service as a training ship.

During the Second World War, her guns were taken from the ship and used in the land defence of Leningrad. The ship herself was docked in Oranienbaum port, and was repeatedly shelled and bombed. On 30 September 1941, she was damaged and sunk in the harbour.

She was later salvaged and repaired after the war.

== Postwar ==
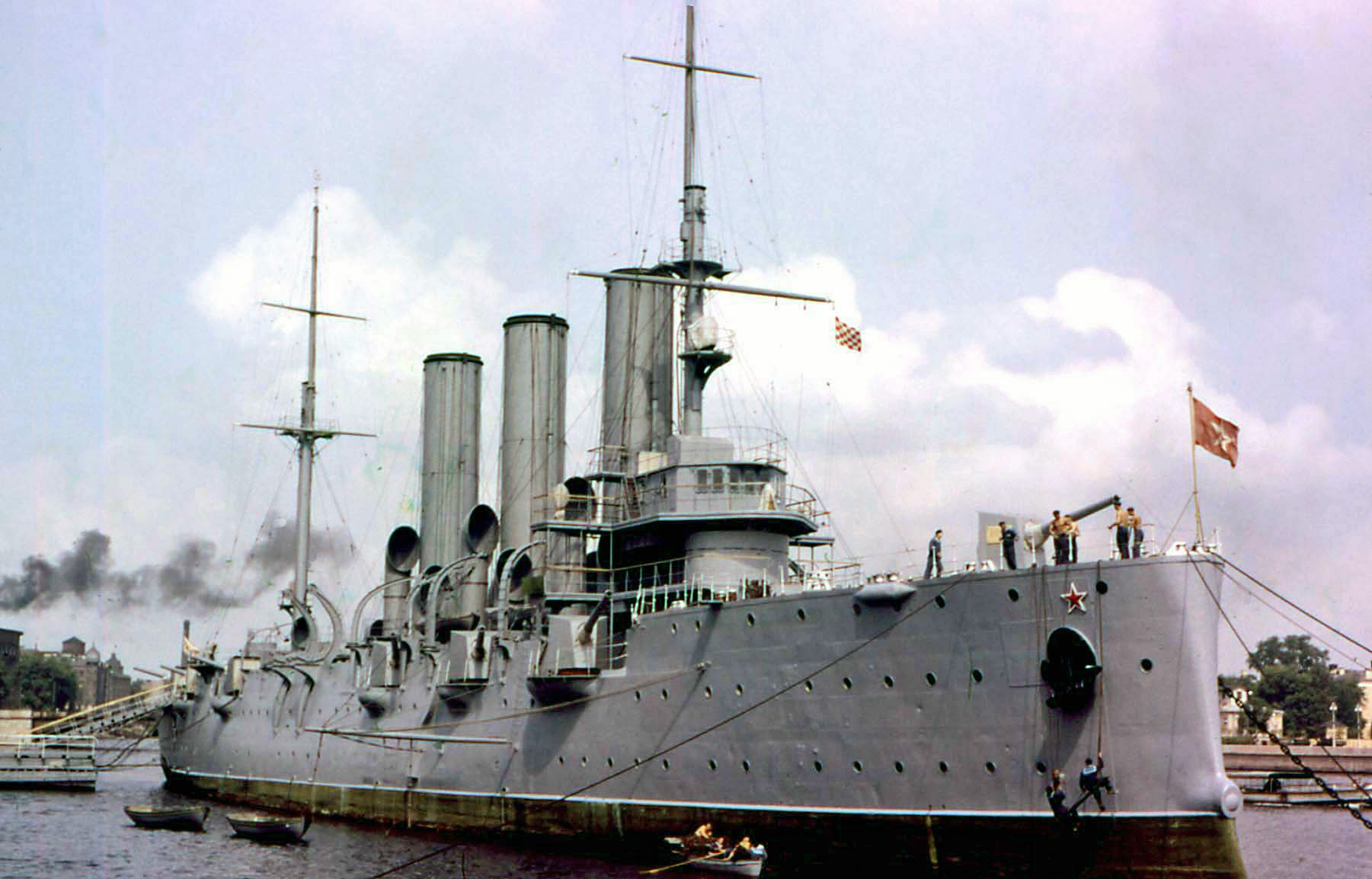
Aurora in 1961

The ship was opened as a museum ship in Leningrad in 1957, as a monument to the October Revolution.

After having served as a museum ship for 27 years, from 1948 to 1987, the cruiser was once again placed in her construction yard, the Admiralty Shipyard, for capital restoration. During the overhaul, due to deterioration, the ship's hull below the waterline was replaced with a new welded hull according to the original drawings. The cut off lower hull section was towed into the Gulf of Finland to the decommissioned Ruchi Naval Base, and sunk near the shore. The restoration revealed that some of the ship's parts, including the armour plates, were originally made in Britain.

In January 2013, Russian Defence Minister Sergey Shoygu announced plans to recommission Aurora and make her the flagship of the Russian Navy due to her historical and cultural importance. On 21 September 2014, the ship was towed to the Admiralty Shipyard in Kronstadt to be overhauled, to return in 2016. On 16 July 2016, she returned to her home harbour in Saint Petersburg.

== In popular culture ==
The 1965 Soviet film The Salvos of the Aurora Cruiser shows the ship's action in the October Revolution.

In 1973, a short film about the ship, titled Aurora, was released.

== Gallery ==
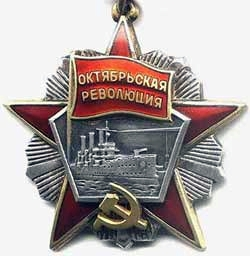
Aurora is pictured on the Order of the October Revolution

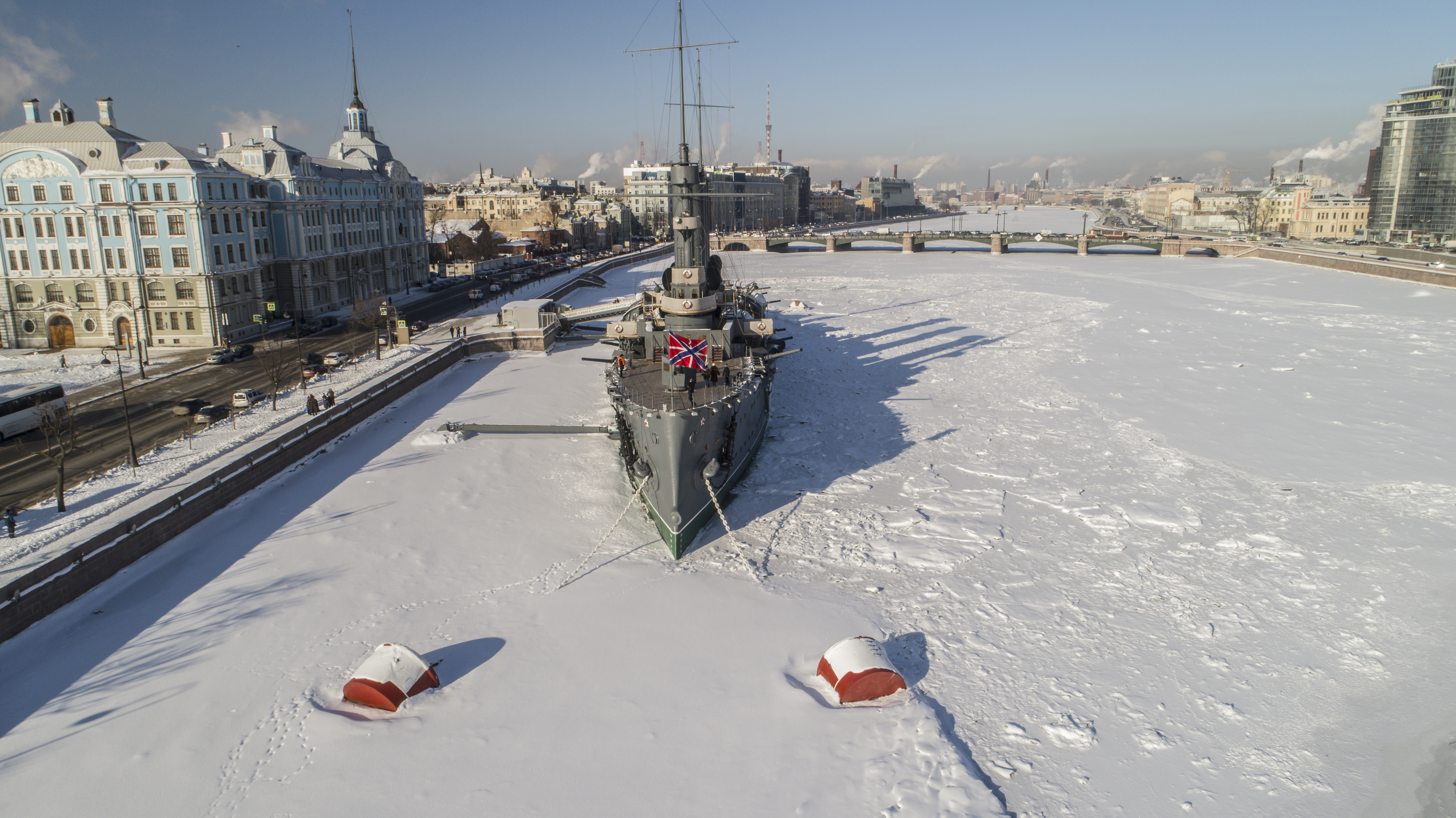
Aurora trapped in ice

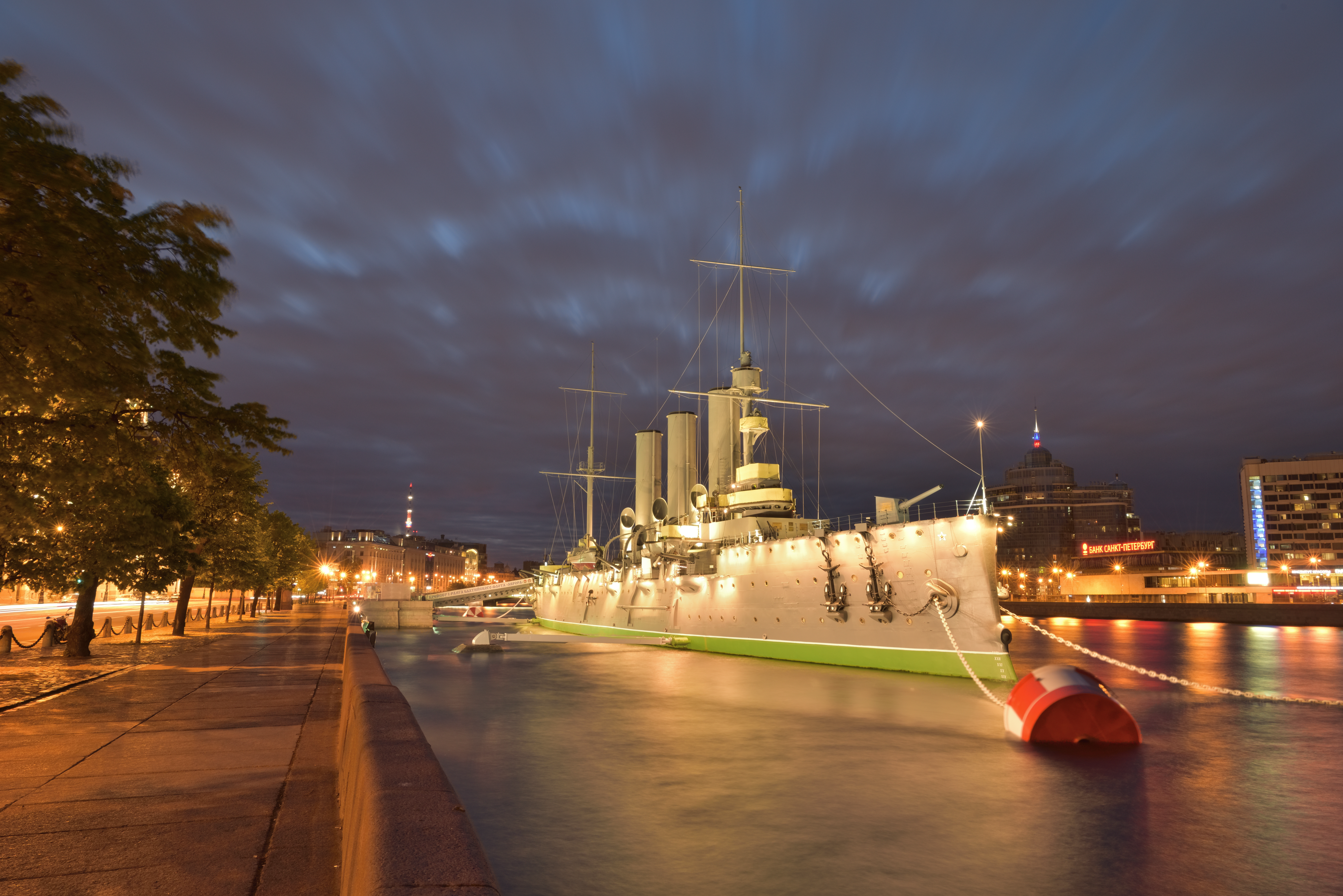
Aurora at night

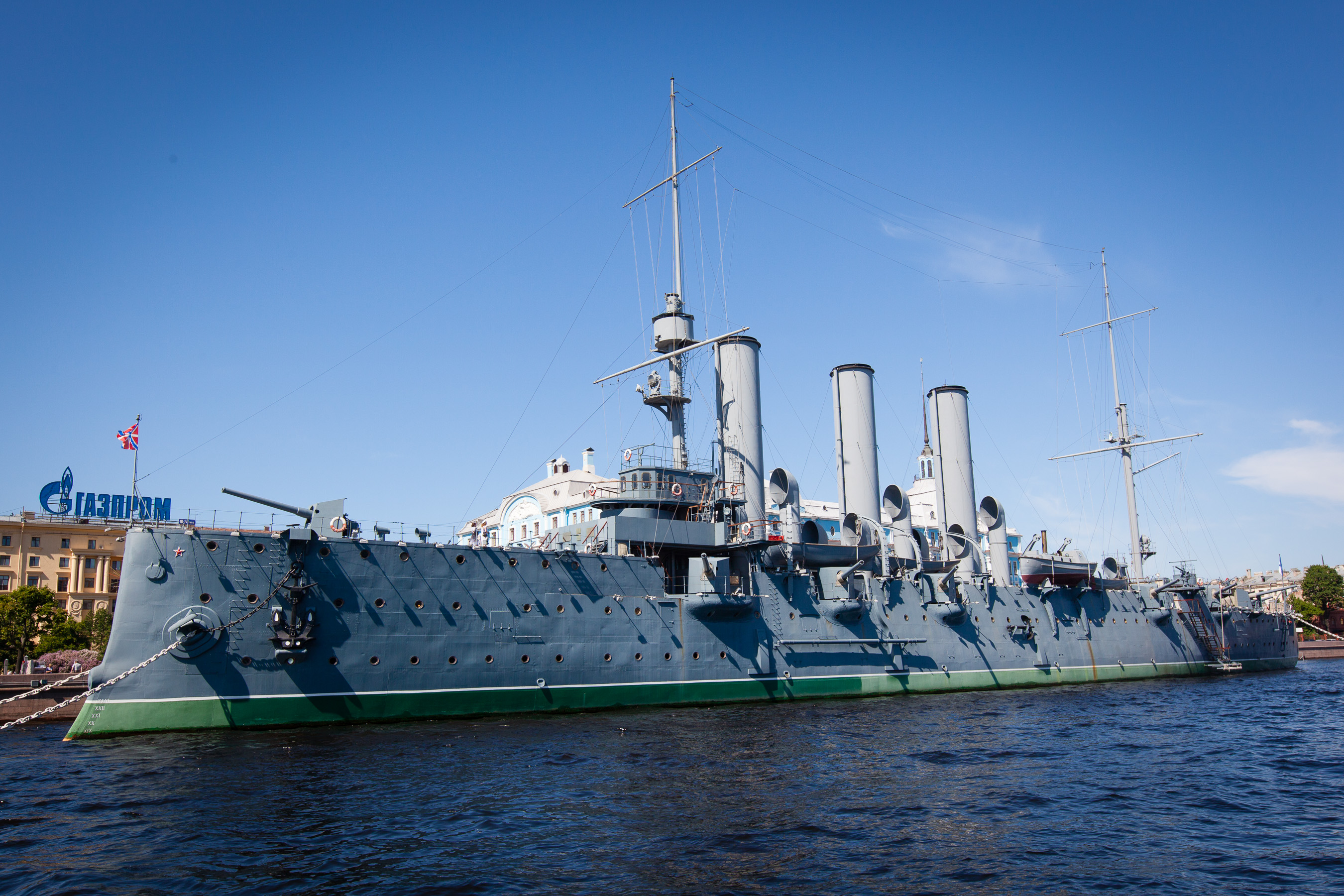
Port side view of Aurora

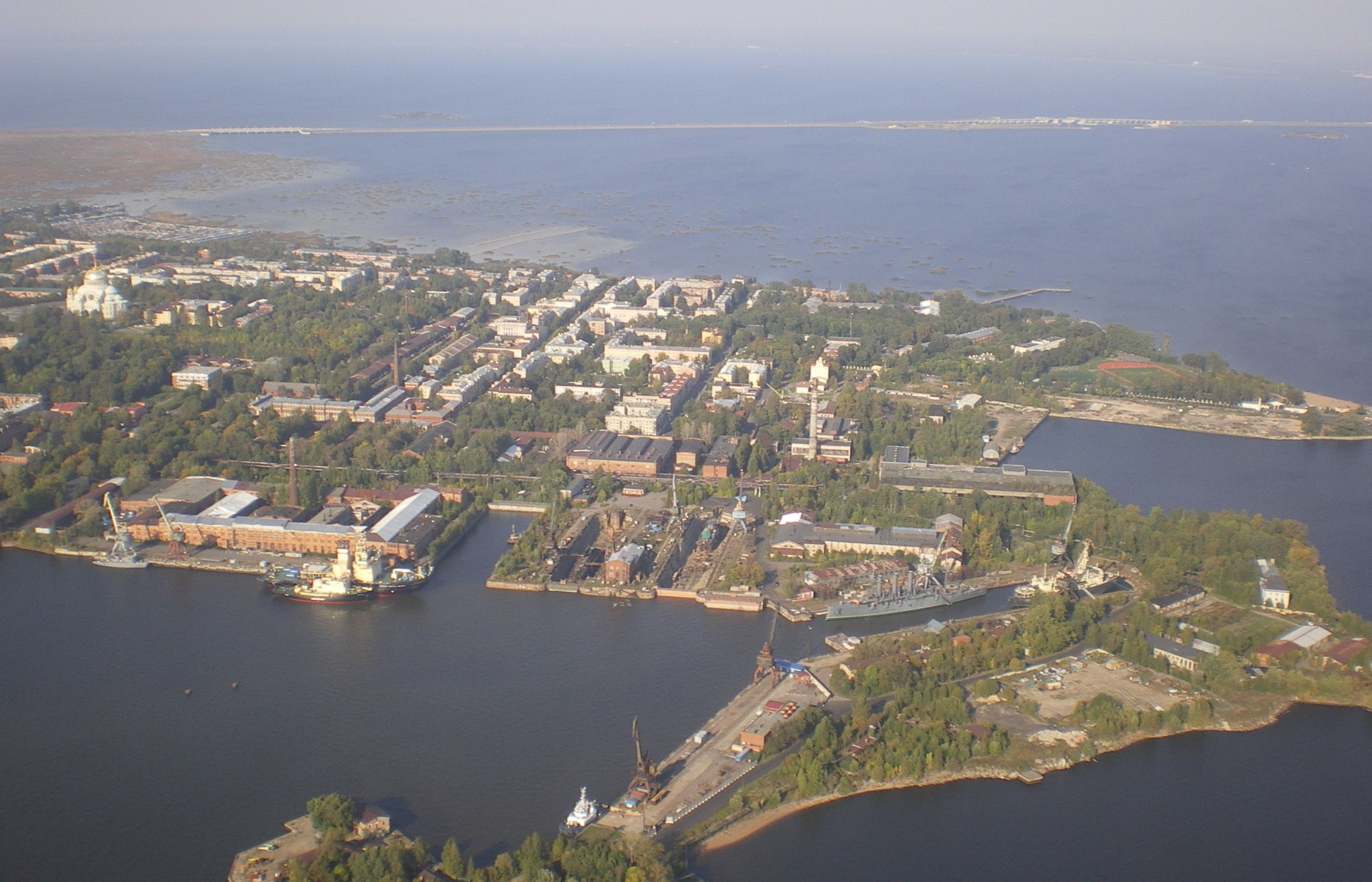
Aurora and Krasin in Kronstadt

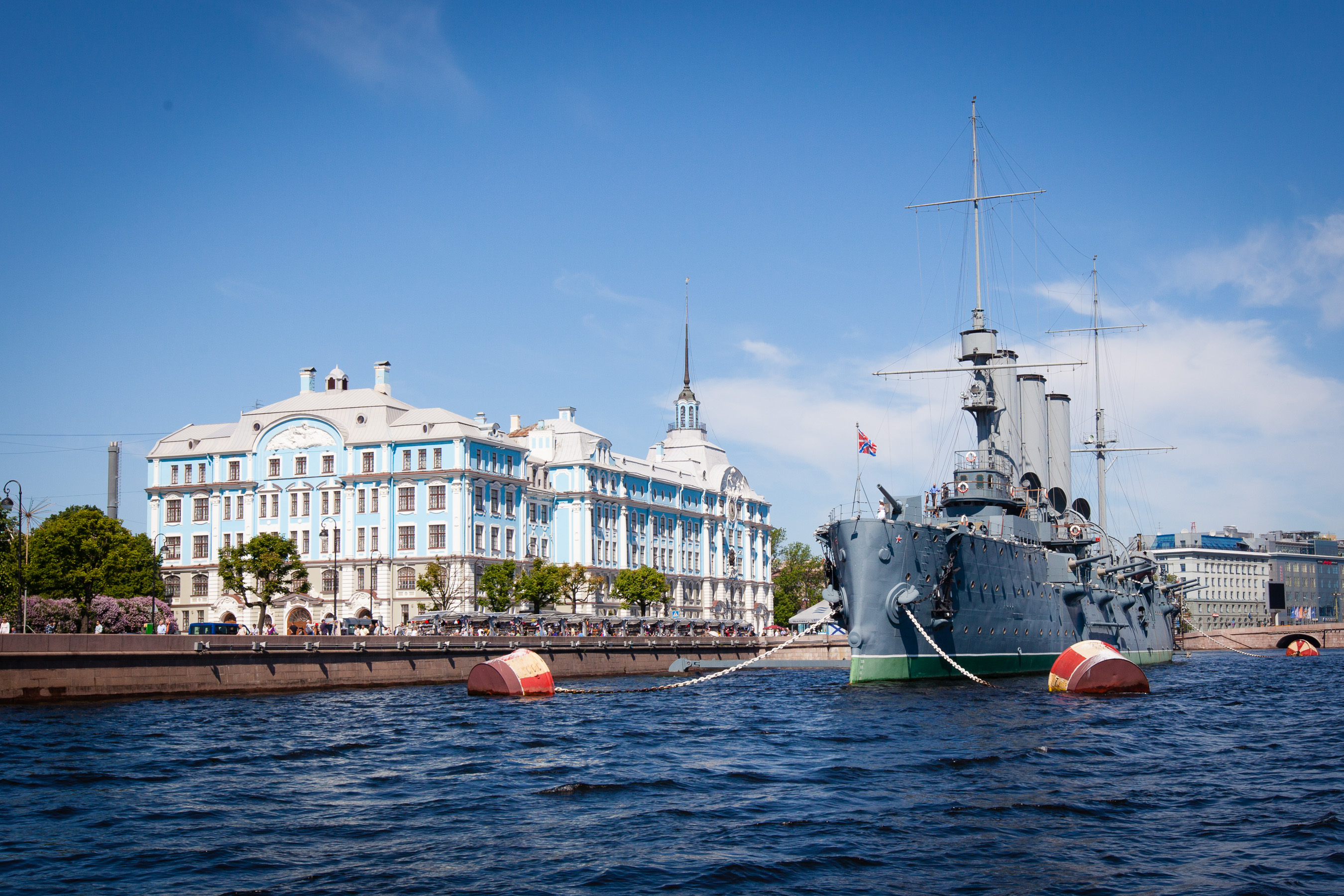
Aurora is docked near Nakhimov Naval School

=== Aurora Flags ===
Due to the honoring of the ship with high state awards, the flag flown at the stern is a special version of the main Naval Ensign. This tradition dates back to 1927, when Aurora was awarded the Order of the Red Banner and lasted until the end of Soviet Navy and was then resumed after returning from a major overhaul in 2016.

Naval ensign of Russian Empire

Red flag raised on 25 October 1917.

Naval Ensign of Russian SFSR raised on 23 February 1923 after the renovation of the cruiser Aurora

Naval Ensign of Soviet Union raised on 7 November 1923

The honorary version of the Ensign with the Order of the Red Banner used on the ship (1 July 1927 - November 1927)

The honorary version of the Ensign with the ORB used on the ship (2 November 1927 - 26 May 1935)

The honorary version of the Ensign with the ORB used on the ship (26 May 1935 - 23 February 1968)

The honorary version of the Ensign with the Order of the October Revolution and ORB used on the ship (23 February 1968 - 26 July 1992)

Naval ensign of Russian Federation (26 July 1992 - 1 January 2001)

Naval ensign of Russian Federation (1 January 2001 - 31 July 2016)

The honorary version of the Ensign with the OOR and ORB used on the ship (from 31 July 2016)

== See also ==
- Japanese battleship Mikasa, the only other surviving warship from the Battle of Tsushima.
- USS Olympia, a U.S. Navy protected cruiser preserved in Philadelphia
- The Twelfth Symphony by Dmitri Shostakovich (title of 3rd movement).
- The Baku Metro's Qara Qarayev Station, formerly named Avrora Station.
