= List of warships sunk during the Russo-Japanese War =

This is a list of warships sunk during the Russo-Japanese War.

== Causes of Japanese and Russian Warships sunk during the war ==
Although submarines, torpedoes, torpedo boats, and steel battleships had existed for many years, the Russo-Japanese war was the first conflict to see mature forms of these weapon systems deployed in large numbers. Over a hundred of the newly invented torpedo boats and nearly the same number of torpedo boat destroyers were involved. The Imperial Russian Navy would become the first navy in history to possess an independent operational submarine fleet on 1 January 1905. With this submarine fleet making its first combat patrol on 14 February 1905, and its first clash with enemy surface warships on 29 April 1905, all this nearly a decade before World War I even began.

During the course of the war, the Imperial Russian Navy (IRN) and the Imperial Japanese Navy (IJN) would launch nearly 300 self-propelled automotive torpedoes at one another. Dozens of warships would be hit and damaged, but only 1 battleship, 2 armoured cruisers, and 2 destroyers would be permanently sunk (not salvaged). Another 80 plus warships would be destroyed by the traditional gun, mine, or other cause. The Russian battleship Oslyabya was the first modern battleship sunk by gunfire alone, and Admiral Rozhestvensky's flagship, the battleship Knyaz Suvorov was the first modern battleship sunk by the new "torpedo" on the high seas.

=== Vessel type and cause of loss ===
- Battleships lost to naval gunfire – 3 (plus 1 Coastal Battleship) IRN
- Battleships lost to land/shore batteries – 4 IRN
- Battleships lost to combination of gunfire & torpedoes – 2 IRN
- Battleships lost to strictly torpedoes – 1 IRN
- Battleships lost to mines – 1 IRN/2 (plus 1 Coastal Battleship) IJN
- Cruisers lost to naval gunfire – 5 IRN
- Cruisers lost to land/shore batteries – 3 IRN
- Cruisers lost to mines – 1 IRN/4 IJN
- Destroyers (DDs, GBs, TBDs, TBs) lost to naval gunfire – 6 IRN/3 IJN
- Destroyers (DDs, GBs, TBDs, TBs) lost to shore batteries – 3 IRN
- Destroyers (DDs, GBs, TBDs, TBs) lost to gunfire & torpedoes – 1 IJN
- Destroyers (DDs, GBs, TBDs, TBs) lost to torpedoes – 2 IRN
- Destroyers (DDs, GBs, TBDs, TBs) lost to mines – 3 IRN/3 IJN
- Auxiliary cruisers lost to naval gunfire – 1 IRN
- Auxiliary Cruisers lost to shore batteries – 1 IRN
- Auxiliary Gunboats lost to mines – 1 IJN
- Minelayers lost to shore batteries – 1 IRN
- Minelayers lost to mines – 1 IRN
- Submarines – 3 lost to scuttling & 1 lost by shipwreck IRN (Note: Only IRN submarines were operational during the war)

The above data includes vessels that were sunk and consequently salvaged (raised) and put back into service by either combatant. Data regarding surface vessels either shipwrecked or scuttled was excluded.

- Imperial Russian Navy (IRN) total losses: 11 Battleships, 1 Coastal Battleship, 9 Cruisers, 14 Destroyers, 2 Auxiliary Cruisers, 2 Minelayers, 4 Submarines.
- Imperial Japanese Navy (IJN) total losses: 2 Battleships, 1 Coastal Battleship, 4 Cruisers, 7 Destroyers, 1 Auxiliary Gunboat.

== Japanese warships sunk ==
=== Warship type, name, and date of loss ===
- Battleships
  - Hatsuse sunk 15 May 1904.
  - Yashima sunk 15 May 1904.
- Corvettes
  - Kaimon sunk 5 July 1904
- Cruisers
  - Miyako sunk 14 May 1904.
  - Saien sunk 30 November 1904.
  - Takasago sunk 13 December 1904.
  - Yoshino sunk 15 May 1904.
- Gunboats
  - Atago sunk 6 November 1904.
  - Heien sunk 18 September 1904.
  - Ōshima sunk 18 May 1904.
- Torpedo boats
  - (#34) 27 May 1905
  - (#35) 27 May 1905
  - (#42) 15 December 1904
  - (#48) 12 May 1904
  - (#51) 28 June 1904
  - (#53) 14 December 1904
  - (#69) 27 May 1905
- Torpedo boat destroyers
  - Akatsuki 17 May 1904
  - Hayatori 3 September 1904

== Russian warships sunk ==
From 1880 through the end of the war, Russia prepared a systematic plan to build their navy into a major naval power, able to meet any modern adversary—which during this time period were primarily based in Europe. By 1884 Russia lead the world in numbers of the newly invented torpedo boats and torpedo boat destroyers with 115 such vessels. By 1904, the IRN was a first rate navy, but by the end of 1905, Russia was reduced to a third rate naval power.

=== Warship type, name, and date of loss ===
The list below excludes captured, surrendered, or sunken warships that were raised and put back into service by either combatant.

- Auxiliary cruisers
  - Angara 30 October 1904
  - Ural 27 May 1905
- Battleships
  - Borodino 27 May 1905
  - Imperator Aleksandr III 27 May 1905
  - Knyaz Suvorov 27 May 1905
  - Navarin 28 May 1905
  - Oslyabya 27 May 1905
  - Petropavlovsk 13 April 1904
  - Sevastopol 2 January 1905
  - Sissoi Veliky 28 May 1905
- Coastal defense ships
  - Admiral Ushakov 28 May 1905
- Cruisers
  - Admiral Nakhimov 28 May 1905
  - Boyarin12 February 1904
  - Dmitrii Donskoi 28 May 1905
  - Izumrud 29 May 1905
  - Rurik 14 August 1904
  - Svetlana 28 May 1905
  - Vladimir Monomakh 28 May 1905
- Gunboats
  - Bobr 26 December 1904
  - Gremyashchi 18 August 1904
  - Koietz 9 February 1904
  - Otvajni 2 January 1905
  - Sivuch 2 August 1904
  - Zabiyaka 25 October 1904
- Minelayers
  - Amur 18 December 1904
  - Yenisei 11 February 1904
- Repair ships
  - Kamchatka 27 May 1905
- Sloops
  - Djigit 2 January 1905
  - Razboinik 2 January 1905
- Torpedo Boat Destroyers
  - Bditelni 2 January 1905
  - Bezuprechni 28 May 1905
  - Blestyashtchi 28 May 1905
  - Boevoi 2 January 1905
  - Buinyi 28 May 1905
  - Buistri 28 May 1905
  - Burni 11 August 1904
  - Gromki 28 May 1905
  - Leitenant Burakov 24 July 1904
  - Rastoropni 16 November 1904
  - Razyashchi 2 January 1905
  - Silni 2 January 1905
  - Strashni 13 April 1904
  - Steregushchi 19 March 1904
  - Stroini 13 November 1904
  - Storozhevoi 2 January 1905
  - Vnimatelni 26 May 1904
  - Vuinoslivi 24 August 1904
  - Vnushitelni 25 February 1904
- Torpedo boats
  - Tantchikhe (#201) 21 August 1904
  - (#202) 1 October 1904
  - Ussuri (#204) 30 June 1904
  - (#208) 13 July 1904
- Torpedo gunboats
  - Guidamak 2 January 1905
  - Vsadnik 15 December 1904

=== Russian ships captured, repaired and recommissioned by Japan ===
- Battleships
  - Imperator Nikolai I recommissioned as the Iki.
  - Oryol recommissioned as the Iwami.
  - Peresvet recommissioned as the Sagami. Sold back to Russia in 1916.
  - Pobeda recommissioned as the Suwo.
  - Poltava recommissioned as the Tango. Sold back to Russia in 1916.
  - Retvizan recommissioned as the Hizen.
- Coastal defense ships
  - Admiral Seniavin recommissioned as the Mishima.
  - General-Admiral Apraksin recommissioned as the Okinoshima.
- Cruisers
  - Bayan recommissioned as the Aso.
  - Novik recommissioned as the Suzuya.
  - Pallada recommissioned as the Tsugaru.
  - Varyag recommissioned as the Soya. Sold back to Russia in 1916.
- Destroyers
  - Bedovyi recommissioned as the Satsuki.
  - Ryeshitelni (former Kondor) recommissioned as the Akatsuki, later renamed the Yamabiko.
  - Sil‘nyi recommissioned as the Fumizuki.

== Bibliography ==
- Forczyk, Robert (2009). Russian Battleship vs Japanese Battleship, Yellow Sea 1904–05. Osprey. ISBN 978-1-84603-330-8.
- Olender, Piotr (2010). Russo-Japanese Naval War 1904–1905, Vol. 2, Battle of Tsushima. Sandomierz, Poland: Stratus s.c. ISBN 978-83-61421-02-3.
- Watts, Anthony J. (1990). The Imperial Russian Navy. London, Great Britain: Arms and Armour Press. ISBN 0-85368-912-1.
