= Russian battleship Rostislav =

Russian battleship

Coordinates: 45°25′01″N 36°37′43″E

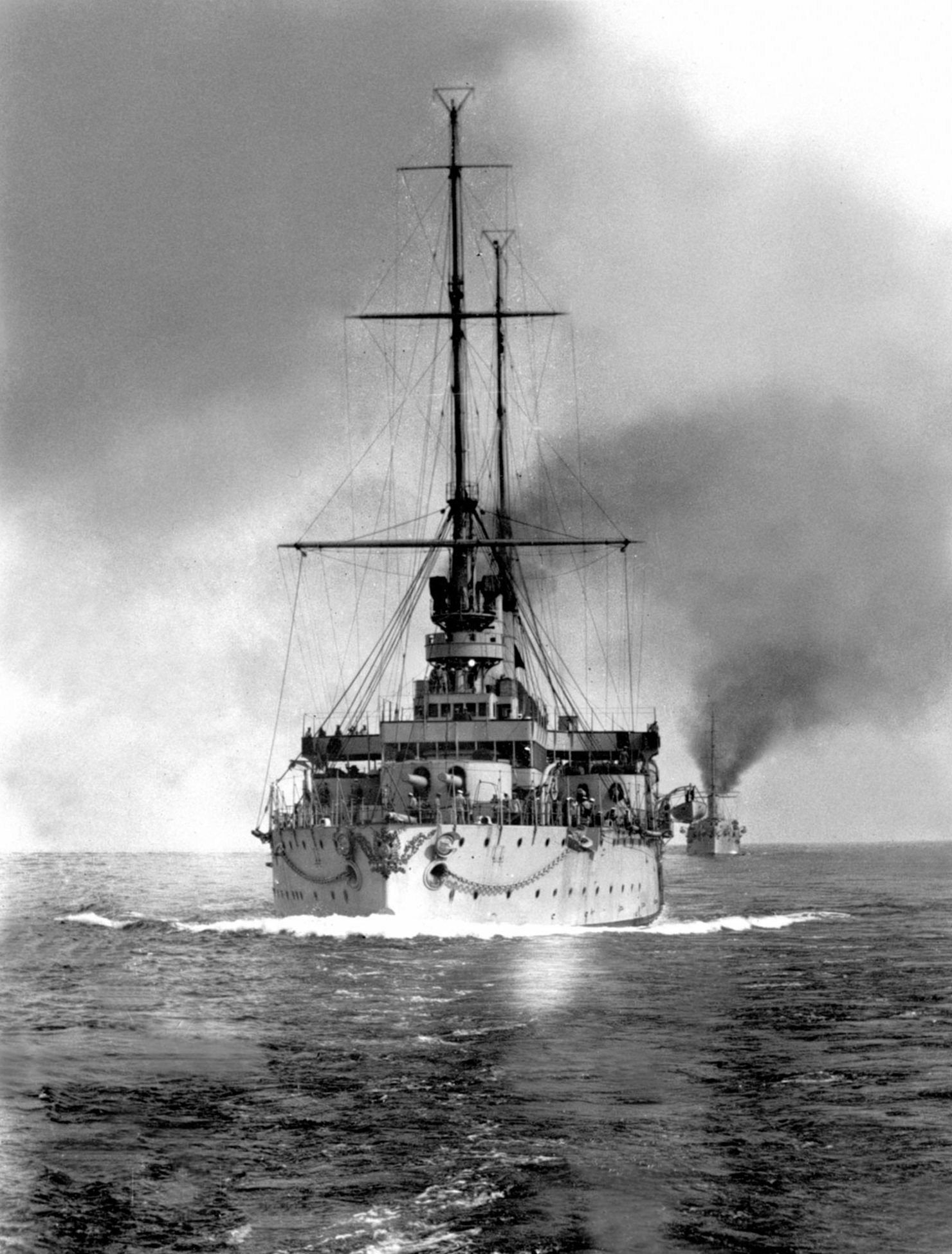
- Rostislav between 1907 and 1916.

Class overview
- Operators: Imperial Russian Navy
- Preceded by: Petropavlovsk class
- Succeeded by: Peresvet class
- Built: 1894–1900
- In service: 1900–1920
- Completed: 1
- Lost: 1

History

Russian Empire
- Name: Rostislav (Russian: Ростислав)
- Namesake: Rostislav I of Kiev
- Operator: Imperial Russian Navy
- Builder: Nikolayev Admiralty Shipyard
- Laid down: January 30, 1894 (actual); May 19, 1895 (formal) (Note: All dates used in this article are New Style. Russia was still using the Julian calendar, and the dates on that calendar were 13 days earlier at that time.)
- Launched: September 2, 1896
- Christened: May 20, 1894
- Completed: March 1900
- Fate: Scuttled November 1920

General characteristics
- Type: Pre-dreadnought battleship
- Displacement: 8,880 long tons (9,022 t) (designed); 10,520 long tons (10,689 t) (actual)
- Length: 351 ft 10 in (107.2 m)
- Beam: 68 ft (20.7 m)
- Draft: 22 ft (6.7 m) (designed); 25 ft 2 in (7.7 m) (actual)
- Installed power: 8 fire-tube boilers; 8,500 ihp (6,300 kW)
- Propulsion: 2 shafts, 2 triple-expansion steam engines
- Speed: 15 knots (28 km/h; 17 mph)
- Range: 4,100 nautical miles (7,600 km; 4,700 mi) at 8 knots (15 km/h; 9.2 mph)
- Complement: 633 (1900), 831–852 (World War I)
- Armament: 2 × twin 10 in (254 mm) guns; 4 × twin 6 in (152 mm) guns; 12 × single 47 mm (1.9 in) guns; 16 × single 37 mm (1.5 in) guns (Note: Replaced in 1915 for 75-mm and 37-mm guns – Melnikov, p. 11.); 6 × 15 in (381 mm) torpedo tubes
- Armour: Harvey armor; Belt: 14.5 in (368 mm); Deck: 2–3 in (51–76 mm); Turrets: 10 in (254 mm); Conning tower: 6 in (152 mm); Bulkheads: 5–9 in (127–229 mm)

Rostislav was a pre-dreadnought battleship built by the Nikolaev Admiralty Shipyard in the 1890s for the Black Sea Fleet of the Imperial Russian Navy. She was conceived as a small, inexpensive coastal defence ship, but the Navy abandoned the concept in favor of a compact, seagoing battleship with a displacement of 8,880 long tons (9,022 t). Poor design and construction practices increased her actual displacement by more than 1,600 long tons (1,626 t). Rostislav became the world's first capital ship to burn fuel oil, rather than coal. Her combat ability was compromised by the use of 10-inch (254 mm) main guns instead of the de facto Russian standard of 12 inches (305 mm).

Her hull was launched in September 1896, but non-delivery of the ship's main guns delayed her maiden voyage until 1899 and her completion until 1900. In May 1899 Rostislav became the first ship of the Imperial Navy to be commanded by a member of the House of Romanov, Captain Alexander Mikhailovich. From 1903 to 1912 the ship was the flagship of the second-in-command of the Black Sea Fleet. During the 1905 Russian Revolution her crew was on the verge of mutiny, but ultimately remained loyal to the regime, and actively suppressed the mutiny of the cruiser Ochakov.

Rostislav was actively engaged in World War I until the collapse of the Black Sea Fleet in the beginning of 1918. She was the first Russian ship to fire on enemy targets on land during World War I, the first to be hit by a German airstrike, and the first to destroy a submarine, albeit a Russian one. In April 1918 the fleeing Bolsheviks abandoned Rostislav in Sevastopol. A year later the British occupation forces disabled her engines. The White forces used the ship as a towed floating battery, then scuttled her in the Kerch Strait in November 1920.

== Design and description ==
Similar in size to earlier coastal defence ships but seaworthy for operations in the Black Sea, Rostislav was conceived in 1892 as a cheap and compact platform for 12-inch guns. Admiral Nikolay Chikhachov, Chief of the Ministry of the Navy, envisioned a squadron of such ships, each displacing 4,000 to 5,000 long tons (4,064 to 5,080 t), that would fit into his total desired displacement target of 24,000 long tons (24,400 t). Chief designer of the Nikolaev Shipyard, Sergey Ratnik, (Note: In the very beginning of 1893, Ratnik moved from Nikolaev to Saint Petersburg and became chief executive of privately owned Baltic Shipyard. – Melnikov, p. 4) evaluated Chikhachov's request for proposals, and advised against the idea in general. The Naval Technical Committee (NTC) concurred: any meaningful combination of firepower, armor, speed and stability required at least 6,000 long tons (6,096 t). The NTC discarded Ratnik's advice to build an improved copy of the battleship Sissoi Veliky of 8,880 long tons (9,022 t), but did not present a definite alternative. The NTC declined to discuss tactical matters, leaving the choice of armament to Chikhachov.

Chikhachov instructed Andrey Toropov of the Nikolaev Shipyard to draft two proposals, one armed with 10-inch and the other with 12-inch guns. Toropov estimated that the ship should have displaced at least 8,880 tons. Chikhachov admitted the fact and presented the two options to the NTC. The admiral himself and the active fleet commanders voted for the 12-inch caliber, which had already become a worldwide battleship standard, but the NTC strongly advised against it. The Navy brass spent April and May 1893 in lengthy debates. They agreed to increase displacement to 8,880 tons and were leaning toward accepting 12-inch guns when General Admiral Grand Duke Alexey resolved the discussion in favor of the smaller caliber.

Rostislav had the same hull as Sissoi Veliky, protected with the newly developed Harvey armor. She was also the first Russian battleship to use electric power instead of older hydraulic systems to train her guns.

=== General characteristics ===
Rostislav was 345 feet 6 inches (105.3 m) long at the waterline and 351 feet 10 inches (107.2 m) long overall. She had a beam of 68 feet (20.7 m) and a draft of 25 feet 2 inches (7.7 m). She displaced 10,520 long tons (10,689 t), over 1,500 long tons (1,524 t) more than her designed displacement of 8,880 long tons (9,022 t). This weight gain increased her draft by about 3 feet (0.9 m), submerging most, if not all, of her waterline armored belt.

=== Propulsion ===
Rostislav had two vertical triple-expansion steam engines, identical to those of Sissoi Veliky, that had a total designed output of 8,500 indicated horsepower (6,300 kW). Eight cylindrical fire-tube boilers provided steam to the engines, each of which drove one propeller. Half of the boilers were coal-fired and the other half were oil-fired, making Rostislav the first capital ship in the world to use fuel oil. This was done in order to substitute cheap oil from Baku for expensive imported coal. On sea trials, the power plant produced a total of 8,816 ihp (6,574 kW) and a top speed of 15.8 knots (29.3 km/h; 18.2 mph). She carried a maximum of 820 long tons (830 t) of fuel oil and coal at full load that provided a range of 3,100 nautical miles (5,700 km; 3,600 mi) at a speed of 8 knots (15 km/h; 9.2 mph).

=== Armament ===
The main armament consisted of two pairs of 10-inch (254 mm) 45-caliber Model 1891 guns mounted in French-style, center-pivot twin gun turrets fore and aft. Each turret had an arc of fire of 240°. These guns had a maximum elevation of +15° and could depress to −5°. They fired a 496.5-pound (225.2 kg) shell at a muzzle velocity of 2,273 ft/s (693 m/s). At an elevation of +6° the guns had a range of 7,320 metres (8,010 yd). All eight of the 45-caliber, 6-inch (152 mm) Canet Pattern 1891 guns were mounted in twin-gun turrets on the main deck. Each turret was positioned at a corner of the superstructure and had an arc of fire of 110°. They fired shells that weighed 91.4 lb (41.46 kg) with a muzzle velocity of 2,600 ft/s (792 m/s). They had a maximum range of 12,602 yards (11,523 m) when fired at an elevation of +20°.

The anti-torpedo boat armament consisted of twelve 47-millimetre (1.9 in) Hotchkiss guns. Eight of these were mounted in the superstructure and the locations of the remaining four are unclear. They fired a 2.2-pound (1.00 kg) shell at a muzzle velocity of 1,400 ft/s (430 m/s). The ship also mounted sixteen 37-millimetre (1.5 in) Hotchkiss guns, eight of which were carried in the fighting top. The locations of the other eight are unknown. They fired a 1.1-pound (0.50 kg) shell at a muzzle velocity of 2,150 ft/s (660 m/s).

Rostislav carried six 15-inch (381 mm) torpedo tubes. The bow and stern tubes and the aft pair of broadside tubes were above water. The forward broadside tubes were underwater. The ship carried 50 mines to be used to protect her anchorage.

=== Protection ===
The maximum thickness of the Rostislav's waterline belt was 14.5 inches (368 mm), tapering to 10 inches (254 mm) abreast the magazines. It covered 227 feet (69.2 m) of the ship's length and was 7 feet (2.1 m) high. While the exact height of the belt above the designed waterline is unknown, much of it, if not all, would have been below the waterline as the ship's draft was over 3 feet (0.9 m) deeper than designed. The belt terminated forward in a 9-inch (229 mm) transverse bulkhead and aft in a 5-inch (127 mm) bulkhead. The upper belt was 5 inches thick, 7 feet 6 inches (2.3 m) high and covered 160 feet (48.8 m) of the ship's side. The sides of the main gun turrets were 10 inches thick and they had 2.5-inch (64 mm) roofs. The sides of the 6-inch turrets were 6 inches thick as were the sides of the conning tower. The armor deck was flat and located at the upper edge of the main belt. It was 2 inches (51 mm) thick. Below the waterline, forward and aft of the armored citadel, were 3-inch (76 mm) decks.

== Construction ==
Work on Rostislav commenced on January 30, 1894. The ship was officially christened May 20, 1894; in line with Russian tradition, the formal laying down ceremony was delayed until May 19, 1895. The contract for oil-firing boilers and engines was awarded to Baltic Works. The armor was rolled in the United States by Bethlehem Steel within the framework of an earlier contract for Petropavlovsk-class battleships. Bethlehem Steel faced the scrutiny of the Senate Committee on Naval Affairs for charging the Russians an unusually low "introductory" price of $250 to $300 per ton, compared to $600 to $660 paid by the United States Navy. Senator Benjamin Tillman publicly accused Bethlehem and Carnegie of price fixing and robbing the American taxpayer. (Note: According to Senator Benjamin Tillman, Carnegie Works and Bethlehem Steel formed a trust with an intent to rob the U.S. government on naval armor contracts. The law obliged the U.S. Navy to purchase only U.S.-made steel, thus eliminating competitive choices open to other navies. As a result, the U.S. Navy paid $660 a ton when foreign governments paid only $300. – "Serving Two Masters: Naval Officers Employed by Armor Plate Makers". The New York Times, April 28, 1896.)

Rostislav's hull was launched on September 2, 1896. Lack of proper cranes in Nikolaev made the installation of its engines exceedingly difficult, to the point that the navy even considered towing the hull to Sevastopol for completion. The Nikolaev engineers eventually resolved the problem and the ship was ready to sail in July 1897. Rostislav conducted her speed trials on October 21, 1898, still missing her main guns. Her power plant performed flawlessly, but its weight exceeded the design target by more than 295 long tons (300 t).

Non-delivery of the new 10-inch Model 1897 guns, made by the Obukhov Factory in Saint Petersburg for Rostislav, Admiral Ushakov-class coastal defense ships and Peresvet-class battleships, delayed the completion of the ship by two years. One of these guns, earmarked for Admiral Ushakov, exploded at the proving ground and the whole batch was subjected to exhaustive tests and, when possible, repairs. Guns Number 16 through Number 19 passed the tests and were delivered to Sevastopol in July and August 1899. Rostislav was able to sail to her first gunnery trial on April 12, 1900. On the second day of shooting practice the recoil mechanisms of her forward turret failed and more defects were discovered back at the base. Rostislav spent the rest of the spring having her gun mounts repaired, but the problem persisted and the Navy "solved" it by prohibiting them from being used. The gun mounts were rebuilt along the pattern of those used by the armored cruiser Admiral Nakhimov in 1901 and 1902, and Rostislav successfully passed the gunnery tests in June 1902. The ship's electrical turret controls, with their 332 contact pairs, required tedious maintenance and proved too complex for most of the enlisted men.

== Service ==
On May 1, 1899, Captain Grand Duke Alexander Mikhailovich assumed command of Rostislav, becoming the first Romanov since Peter I to command a combat ship. Another Romanov, Grand Duke Kirill, spent a few uneventful months on board Rostislav in 1900. Alexander's guests, parties and diplomatic visits to Istanbul regularly interfered with the crew's duties, but he personally managed the repairs and alterations of the ship's equipment. Shipyards and contractors treated Rostislav as a priority customer. Alexander, based on his experience with Sissoi Veliky, persuaded the NTC to reinforce Rostislav's rudder frame and supervised installation of a backup control post deep under the conning tower. In 1903 Alexander was promoted to rear admiral and returned to his ship as a squadron commander. Rostislav served as the junior flagship of the Black Sea Fleet until September 1912.

The 1900 season revealed grave problems with Rostislav's boilers. Black smoke from burning oil was more conspicuous than coal smoke. Uneven distribution of heat inside the boilers caused severe local overheating, buckling of fireboxes and sudden backdrafts. For three and a half months the boilers failed one by one, starting with small auxiliary power units and ending with the main boilers. Oil delivered by the Rothschild-controlled Russian Standard Oil was not at fault; similar problems were experienced by oil-fired ships of the Baltic Fleet. Repairs and alterations of the power plant continued until 1904, when the continuing boiler failures compelled the Navy to dispense with oil fuel and convert Rostislav to coal in 1904 and 1905. Each round of repairs and alterations added more weight to the already overweight ship, and by 1907 the ship's belt armor was completely below the waterline.

The Tsentralka, the group plotting a mutiny of the Black Sea Fleet, decided on June 25, 1905, that the mutiny should start on Potemkin rather than Rostislav. On June 27, 1905, the day of the battleship Potemkin mutiny, Rostislav was sailing under the ensign of Vice Admiral Alexander Krieger. Nicholas II ordered Krieger and his superior, fleet commander Grigory Chukhnin, to destroy the rebels by force, but the admirals refrained from shooting. They let the rebels flee to Odessa and later to Romania. Krieger's own crew was on the verge of open mutiny. On July 2, 1905, a military council held on board Rostislav decided to moor the ships in Odessa, disconnect the engines from the propellers and let the enlisted men walk ashore at will. By the time of the Ochakov mutiny in November 1905, fleet morale had improved and Krieger did not hesitate to fire two 10-inch and fourteen 6-inch shells against the rebels.

=== Exercises and casualties ===
After the Battle of Tsushima the Imperial Navy concentrated on improving their gunnery skills and fire-control practices. In 1908 Alexei Krylov and Yevgeny Berkalov led Rostislav on an unprecedented long-range gunnery shoot: Rostislav fired 330 ten-inch shells at a distance of 8 to 10 miles (13 to 16 km) in a few days. The experiment proved that the older ballistic tables used by the Navy were inaccurate. Berkalov compiled the data from the 1908 exercise into the new tables adopted by the Navy. Another of Krylov's initiatives, rapid counter-flooding, was standardized in 1909.

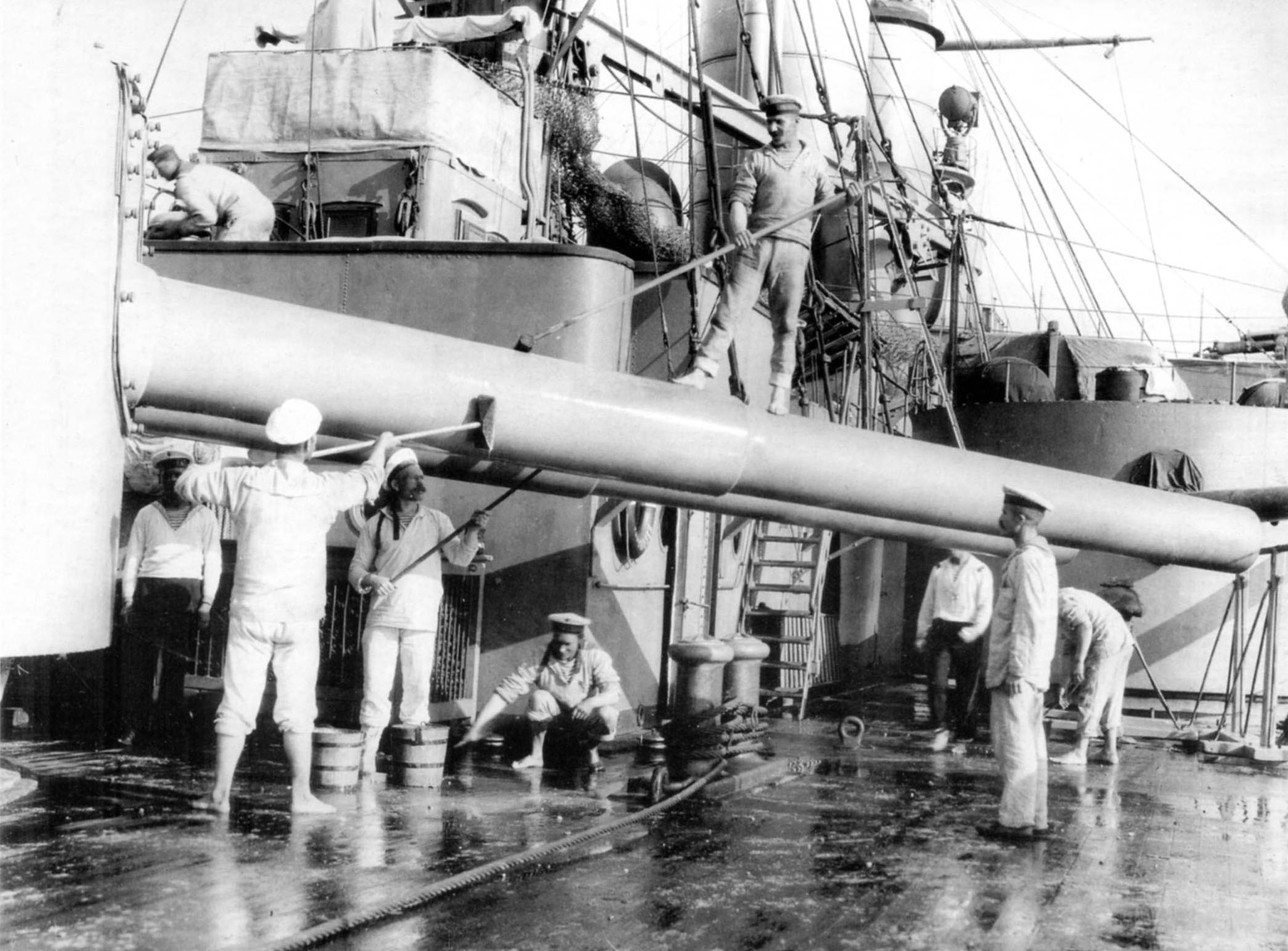
Cleaning the guns of Rostislav

Two plans for modernizing the ship were put forward before World War I. In 1907 the Naval General Staff proposed a major reconstruction aimed at reducing her draft and raising her armor belt higher out of the water. Her above-water torpedo tubes, torpedo nets, auxiliary boilers and 47-millimeter guns would have been removed, her superstructure cut down and her rigging reduced to a single pole mast. These changes would have reduced her displacement by 250 long tons (254 t), but the plan was rejected due to a shortage of money. Her above-water torpedo tubes, however, were removed about this time. In 1912 the staff of the Black Sea Fleet proposed to replace all of her 47 mm guns with four 75-millimetre (3 in) guns and to remove the auxiliary boilers and the submerged torpedo tubes to offset the additional weight. The Naval General Staff did not think that this was worth the cost and rejected the plan. Even though these plans did not come to fruition, other alterations were made to Rostislav before the war. A dozen of her 37 mm guns were removed in 1906, and she was fitted with 15-foot (4.6 m) rangefinders, probably made by Barr and Stroud, in 1907 and 1908.

In 1909 and 1910, Rostislav and the rest of the Black Sea Fleet prepared for joint operations with submarines. She was scheduled for an installation of the first Russian underwater acoustic communication system, but the installation was interrupted and her hardware was installed on the battleship Panteleimon (the former Potemkin) instead. During an anti-submarine exercise on the night of June 11, 1909, Rostislav accidentally rammed and sank the submarine Kambala. Twenty men of Kambala and two rescue divers died. The accident was blamed on reckless maneuvering by the submarine, and Rostislav's captain was cleared of any negligence or wrongdoing.

=== Diplomatic incidents ===
Before the outbreak of World War I Rostislav was involved in two minor international incidents. On August 11, 1911, Evstafi and Panteleimon, two of the Black Sea Fleet battleships paying a state visit to Romania, ran aground on a shoal just off the port of Constanța. Rostislav's officers had detected the hazard and steered her to safety, but did not alert the other ships. The international embarrassment that followed led to the resignation of fleet commander Admiral Ivan Bostrem. During the First Balkan War Rostislav sailed into the Sea of Marmara to protect the Russian Embassy in Istanbul from a mob. (Note: The international "observation fleet" comprised 21 ships, including Rostislav, Goeben and Léon Gambetta. – Melnikov, p. 29.) Rostislav accidentally fired a live shell into the Turkish defenses. No one was injured during the incident, and the captain defused the situation with a personal apology to the Ottoman government.

=== World War I ===
Rostislav spent the winter of 1913–1914 refitting, and in April 1914 she returned to the active fleet with newly overhauled machinery, new rangefinders and new gun sights. The ship made 15.37 knots (28.47 km/h; 17.69 mph) on her post-refit trials.

On November 4, 1914, the Black Sea Fleet sailed out on its first combat operation of the war: the bombardment of Zonguldak. The operation was conceived as a retaliation against the Turkish-German attack on Sevastopol. Rostislav, captained by Kazimierz Porębski, was the "designated gunboat" while other Russian battleships formed a defensive screen around her. On November 6 she fired 251 shells at the port of Zonguldak, reducing it to rubble. On November 18 the ship faced Goeben during the Battle of Cape Sarych, but the German ship broke contact before Rostislav, trailing behind the Russian formation, even spotted her. Rostislav had other encounters with Goeben in 1915 and 1916, but did not engage her directly. (Note: Admiral Andrei Eberhardt deliberately kept the ship out of action to protect the old ship from a vastly superior enemy. He reasoned that a ship with 10-inch guns had no place in a fight of 12-inch guns (as had already been proven by the loss of SMS Blücher in the Battle of Dogger Bank in 1915). – Melnikov, pp. 35–36.) In 1915 the ship received four 75 mm anti-aircraft guns.

After the commissioning of the Imperatritsa Mariya-class dreadnoughts, the old battleships were split into independent combat groups. Rostislav became the flagship of the Batumi Group tasked with supporting the ground operations of the Caucasus Army. Their first joint action began February 5, 1916, near Arhavi. On the first day alone the ship fired 400 shells against the Turks. On March 4 Rostislav and the gunboats Kubanetz and Donetz supported the amphibious landing at Atina. Three days later she supported the landing of marines that ended in the capture of Rize. At the end of March Rostislav and Panteleimon forced the Turks to evacuate Trabzon.

In the summer of 1916 the Navy seriously considered an all-out amphibious assault on the Bosphorus. Fleet commander Andrei Eberhardt anticipated a high risk of naval mine and torpedo hits in the coastal waters and suggested equipping all pre-dreadnought battleships with anti-torpedo bulges. Sinop had her bulges fitted in Nikolaev in July 1916, and Rostislav was next in line, but the work was cancelled in August, and she was transferred to the Romanian coast as flagship of the Constanța Group. Constanța temporarily became an important logistical hub for the Russian troops heading to the Romanian Front, and the base for minelayers, submarines and destroyers harassing the enemy in the Bosphorus area. The Germans responded with air raids; their first aerial success against a Russian naval target was scored against Rostislav. The bomb hit the edge of the aft 10-inch turret and injured sixteen sailors. The turret itself remained fully operational. The collapse of the Romanian Front in October 1916 forced the Navy to evacuate Constanța. Rostislav returned to Sevastopol for a much-needed overhaul.

=== Revolution ===
The February Revolution of 1917 did not demoralize the Black Sea Fleet as quickly as the Baltic Fleet. Captain Fyodor Stark, a former destroyer commander, maintained Rostislav in combat-ready condition until the end of the year. The battleship sailed out for her last voyage to Batumi in September and October. Stark managed to contain the radical politics, anti-German sentiment and Ukrainization of the crew, but nevertheless raised the flag of Ukraine on his return to Sevastopol on October 25. From this moment desertion and "volunteering" into the Red Guards intensified, and by December 21 the crew was reduced to 460 enlisted men and 28 officers. In January 1918 the fleet disintegrated completely: the officers fled from the enraged enlisted men, then the enlisted men abandoned the ships and fled from the advancing German Army. On April 29, 1918, the Bolsheviks managed to extricate two battleships and sixteen destroyers from Sevastopol to Novorossiysk, but Rostislav and the rest of the fleet remained in Sevastopol.

The German occupation of Crimea from May to November 1918 did not affect the abandoned ship. The Anglo-French forces that replaced the Germans stayed in Sevastopol until April 1919. Before leaving, the British wrecked Rostislav's engines on April 25 to prevent the ship from being any use to the advancing Soviets. The White forces of Baron Wrangel used the disabled ship as a floating battery in the Sea of Azov. The ship, manned by a ragtag volunteer crew, was stationed in the shallow waters of the Kerch Strait to harass the Reds in Taman and prevent a landing in the Crimea. After the defeat of Wrangel's land forces, the crew scuttled Rostislav in the Kerch Strait to prevent the Red forces from breaking through to the Black Sea.

When Rostislav sank in the shallows her superstructure remained above water. In 1930, the EPRON (a Soviet salvage unit) retrieved the ship's guns and partially dismantled the hull. According to diver Alexander Yolkin, the remains of the hull are still lying in the strait, around 1,200 metres (1,300 yd) from the Ukrainian coast, and gradually sinking into the silt.

== Bibliography ==
- Bascomb, Neal (2007). Red Mutiny: Eleven Fateful Days on the Battleship Potemkin. Boston: Houghton Mifflin. ISBN 978-0-618-59206-7.
- Friedman, Norman (2011). Naval Weapons of World War One. Barnsley, UK: Seaforth. ISBN 978-1-84832-100-7.
- Godin, Oleg A. & Palmer, David R. (2008). History of Russian Underwater Acoustics. Singapore: World Scientific. ISBN 978-981-256-825-0.
- McLaughlin, Stephen (2003). Russian & Soviet Battleships. Annapolis, Maryland: Naval Institute Press. ISBN 1-55750-481-4.
- Melnikov, R. M. (2006). Эскадренный броненосец "Ростислав" (1893–1920) [Squadron Battleship Rostislav] (in Russian). Saint Petersburg: M. A. Leonov. ISBN 5-902236-34-7.
- Silverstone, Paul H. (1984). Directory of the World's Capital Ships. New York: Hippocrene Books. ISBN 0-88254-979-0.
- Smigielski, Adam (1979). "Imperial Russian Navy Cruiser Varyag". In Roberts, John (ed.). Warship III. London: Conway Maritime Press. ISBN 0-85177-204-8.
- Willmott, H. P. (2009). The Last Century of Sea Power: From Port Arthur to Chanak, 1894–1922. Bloomington, Indiana: Indiana University Press. ISBN 978-0-253-35214-9.
