= Japanese ship Okinoshima =

Two ships from the Japanese Navy have been named Okinoshima:

- Japanese battleship Okinoshima was previously the Russian coast defense ship General-Admiral Apraksin launched in 1866 and renamed on capture by Japan in 1905. She was stricken in 1922.
- Japanese minelayer Okinoshima was a minelayer launched in 1935 and sunk in 1942
