= 254 mm 45 caliber Pattern 1891 =

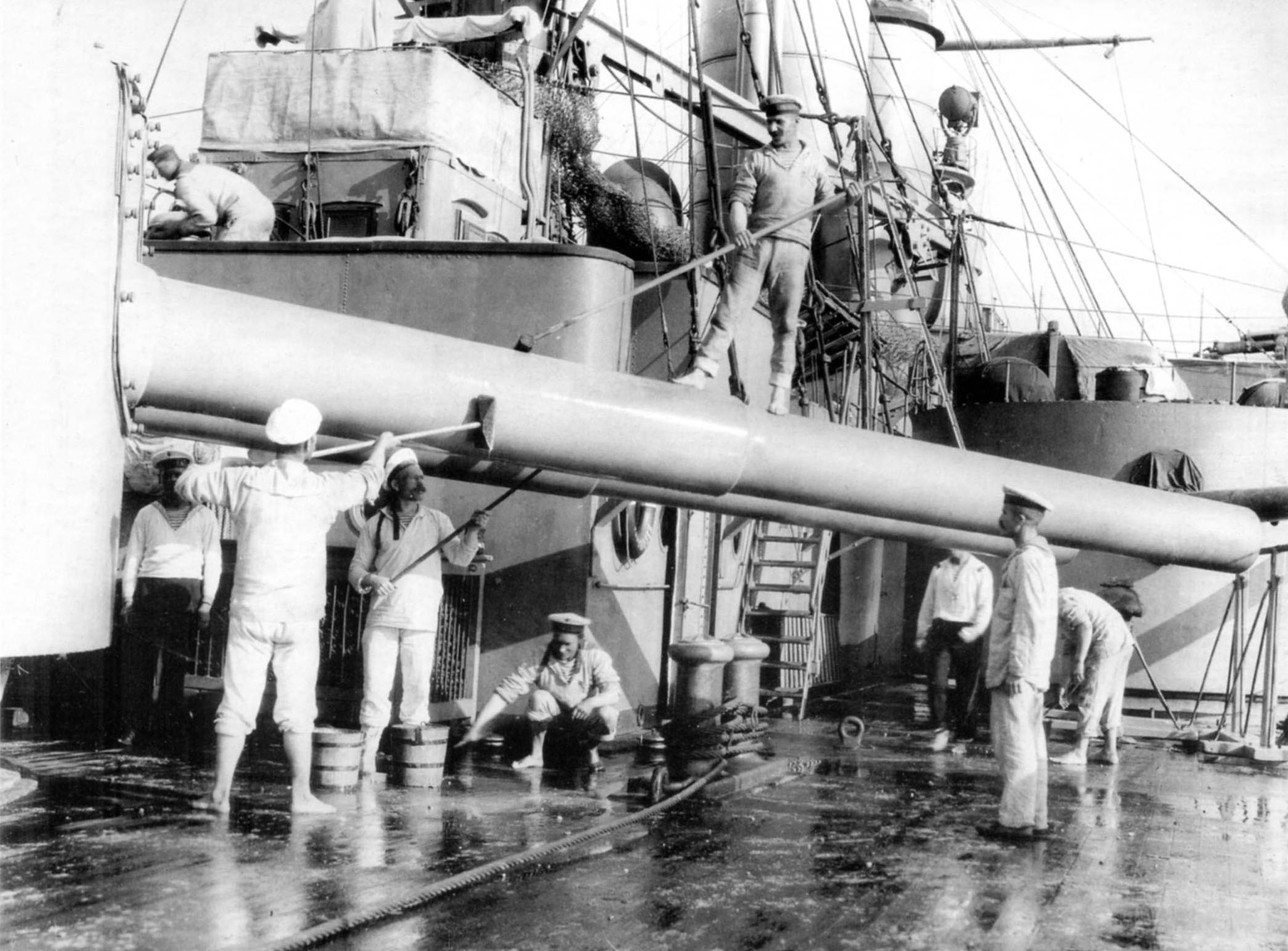
- A twin gun turret aboard the battleship Rostislav.
- Type: Naval gun Coastal artillery
- Place of origin: Russian Empire

Service history
- In service: 1897-1930
- Used by: Russian Empire; Soviet Union; Empire of Japan
- Wars: Russo-Japanese War; World War I

Production history
- Designed: 1892
- Manufacturer: Obukhov State Plant
- Produced: 1897

Specifications
- Mass: 24–27.6 t (26.5–30.4 short tons)
- Length: 11.4 m (37 ft 5 in)
- Barrel length: 11 m (36 ft 1 in)
- Shell: Separate loading bagged charge and projectile
- Shell weight: 225 kg (496 lb)
- Caliber: 254 mm (10.0 in) 45 caliber
- Traverse: -135° to +135°
- Muzzle velocity: 692 m/s (2,270 ft/s)
- Maximum firing range: 20.4 km (12.7 mi) at +30°

The 254 mm 45 caliber Pattern 1891 was a Russian naval gun developed in the years before the Russo-Japanese War that armed coastal defense ships and pre-dreadnought battleships during the Russo-Japanese War and World War I. Guns salvaged from scrapped ships found a second life as coastal artillery. It is believed none were in service during World War II.

== History ==
The 254 mm 45 caliber Pattern 1891 was the product of an agreement between the Imperial Russian Army and Navy to standardize calibers and ammunition during 1892. The gun originally envisioned in 1892 was a 228 mm (9.0 in) 45 caliber gun, with a 192.5 kg (424 lb) shell, a muzzle velocity of 763 m/s (2,500 ft/s) and a brown powder propellant charge. In 1893 a new scaled up 254 mm (10.0 in) 45 caliber gun, weighing 22 t (24 short tons), with a 225 kg (496 lb) Army shell, a muzzle velocity of 914 m/s (3,000 ft/s) and a smokeless powder propellant charge was specified. The weights and dimensions of the new gun were expected to be as close to the original specifications as possible to remain compatible with the ships they were intended to arm. This compromise in design objectives was to have negative effects on the finished product.

Testing in 1895 found that the guns were too lightly built to be able to achieve the specified muzzle velocity even with lower power brown powder. Stress cracks were found and the barrels already produced had to be sent back to the factory to be strengthened and weight grew from 24 t (26 short tons) to 27.6 t (30.4 short tons). The strengthened barrels were not ready until 1897 and after testing in 1899 a lower muzzle velocity of 692 m/s (2,270 ft/s) with reduced charges was accepted. Barrel life was estimated to be 250 rounds.

The elevation range for the gun turrets of the Ushakov, Seniavin, Rostislav was -5° to +15°. The elevation range for gun turrets of the Apraksin, Pobeda, Peresvet and Oslyabya was -5° to +30°. The rate of fire was 120 seconds for Admiral Seniavin, 107 seconds for Ushakov, 93 seconds for Apraksin, but only 80 seconds for Peresvet, Oslyabya and Pobeda.

== Construction ==
The 254 mm 45 caliber Pattern 1891 is believed to be constructed in the same manner as the larger 305mm 40 caliber Pattern 1895 guns of the same period. They were constructed of an A tube and three layers of reinforcing hoops and a jacket. By 1901 the Obukhov State Plant had delivered 30 guns of which 27 were installed on ships. In addition to the guns installed on ships some were employed as coastal artillery, including one battery of five guns at Port Arthur in 1904 and another in the Moon sound area in 1917.

== Naval use ==
=== Coastal defense ships ===
- Admiral Ushakov-class - This class of three ships primary armament consisted of four, 254 mm 45 caliber guns, in twin gun turrets, fore and aft of the ships superstructure. Except for General Admiral Graf Apraksin, whose rear turret only had one gun.

=== Pre-dreadnought battleships ===
- Peresvet-class - This class of three ships primary armament consisted of four, 254 mm 45 caliber guns, in twin gun turrets, fore and aft of the ships superstructure.
- Rostislav - This ships primary armament consisted of four, 254 mm 45 caliber guns, in twin gun turrets, fore and aft of the ships superstructure.

== Ammunition ==
Ammunition was of loading bagged charge and projectile type. The projectiles weighed 225 kg (496 lb) and the charge weighed 65 kg (143 lb).

The gun was able to fire:

- Armor Piercing
- High Explosive

== Photo gallery ==
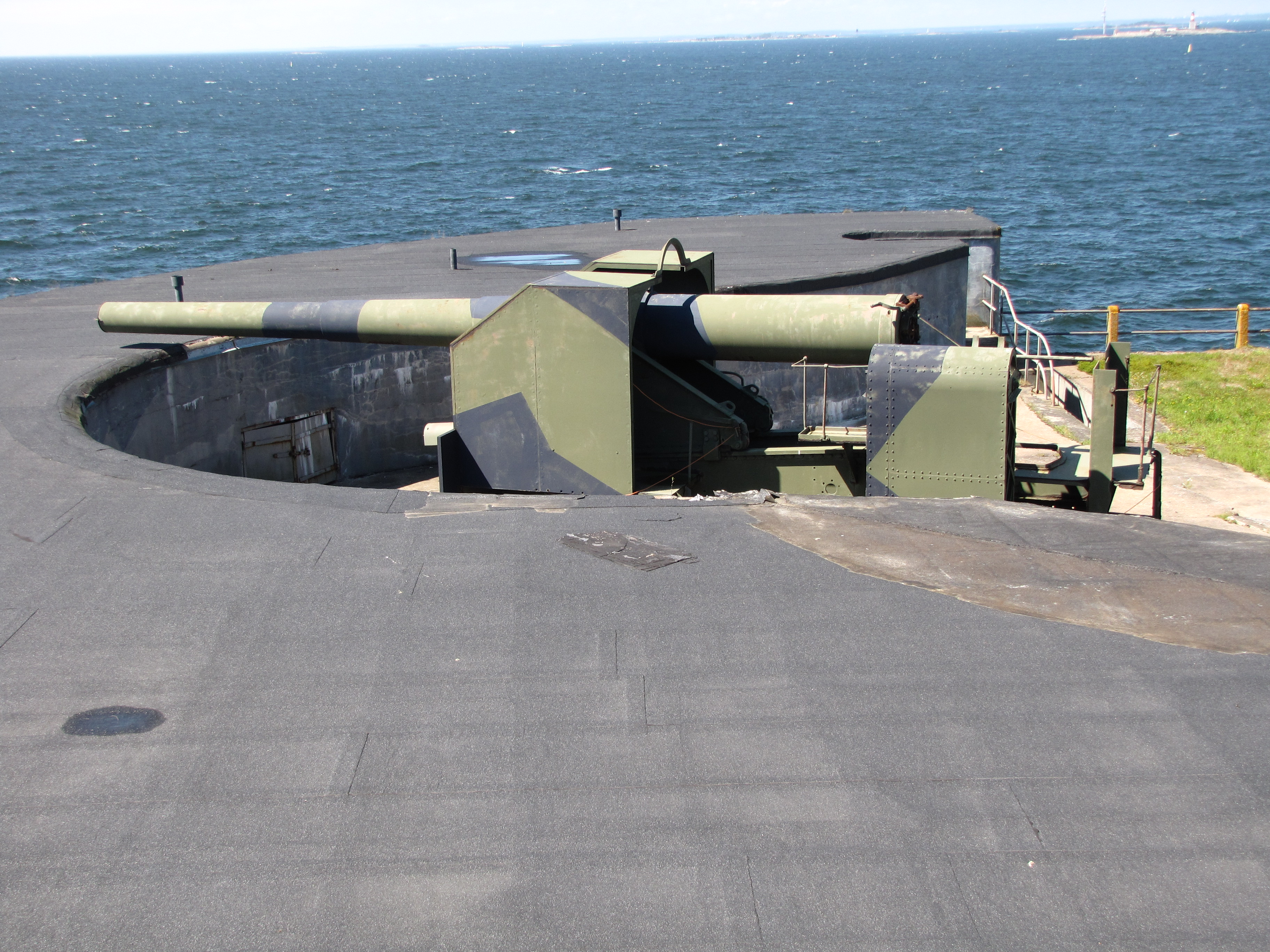
254 mm 45 caliber model 1891 coastal gun on Durlacher mount in Kuivasaari. Manufactured by Obukhov in 1906, serial number 114.

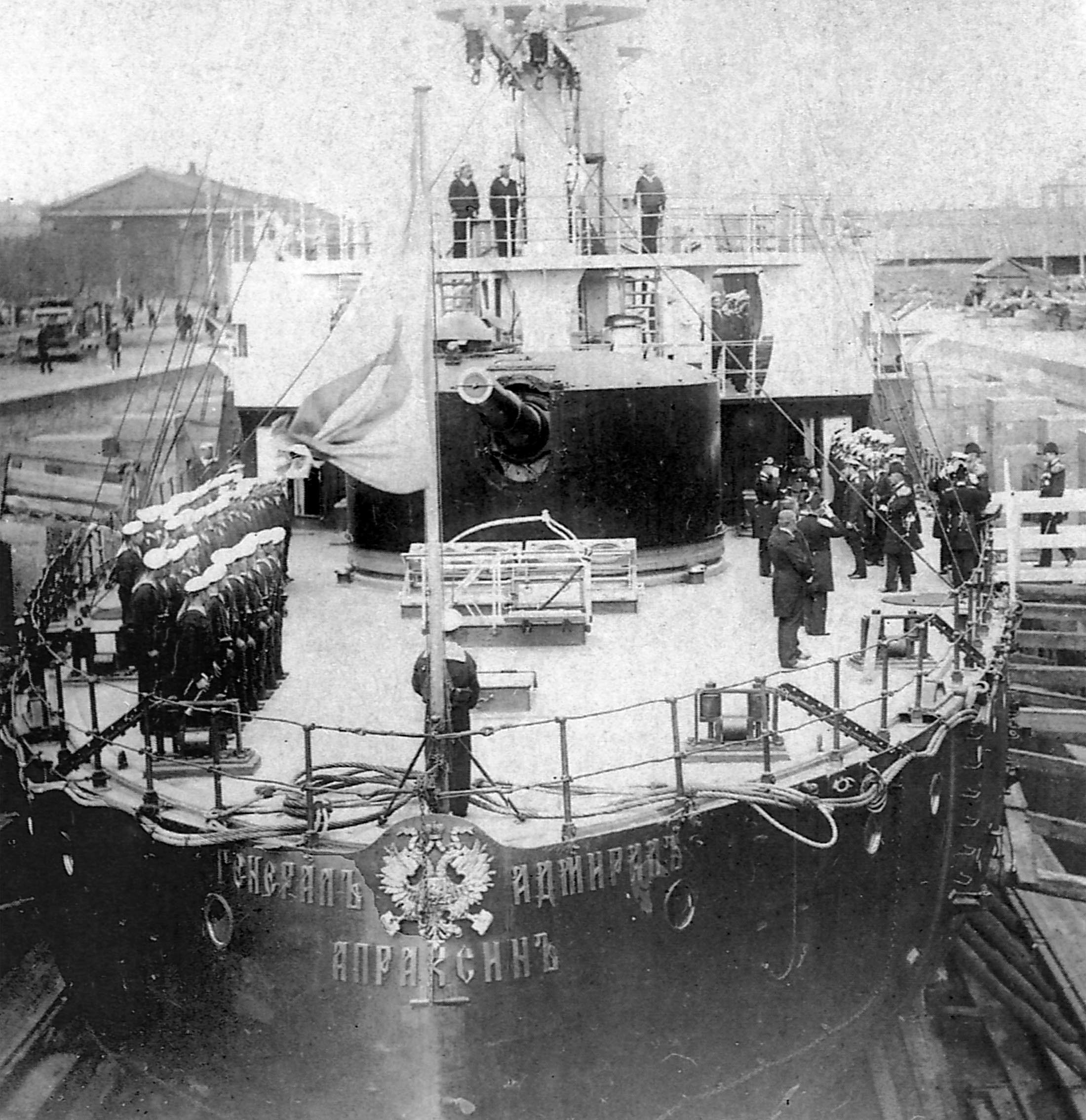
Apraksin in Kronstadt 1901.

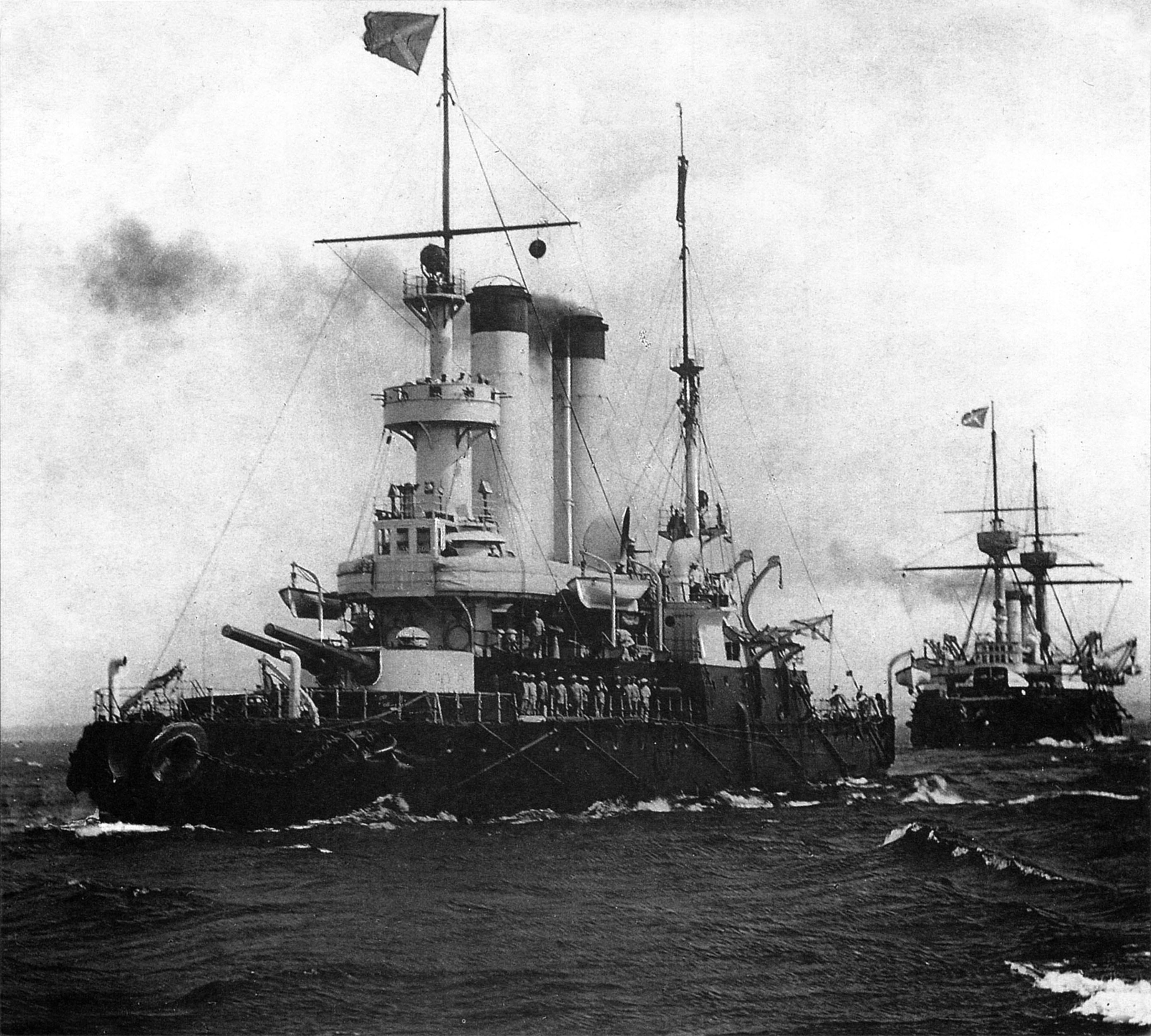
Admiral Ushakov and Imperator Aleksandr II in 1902.

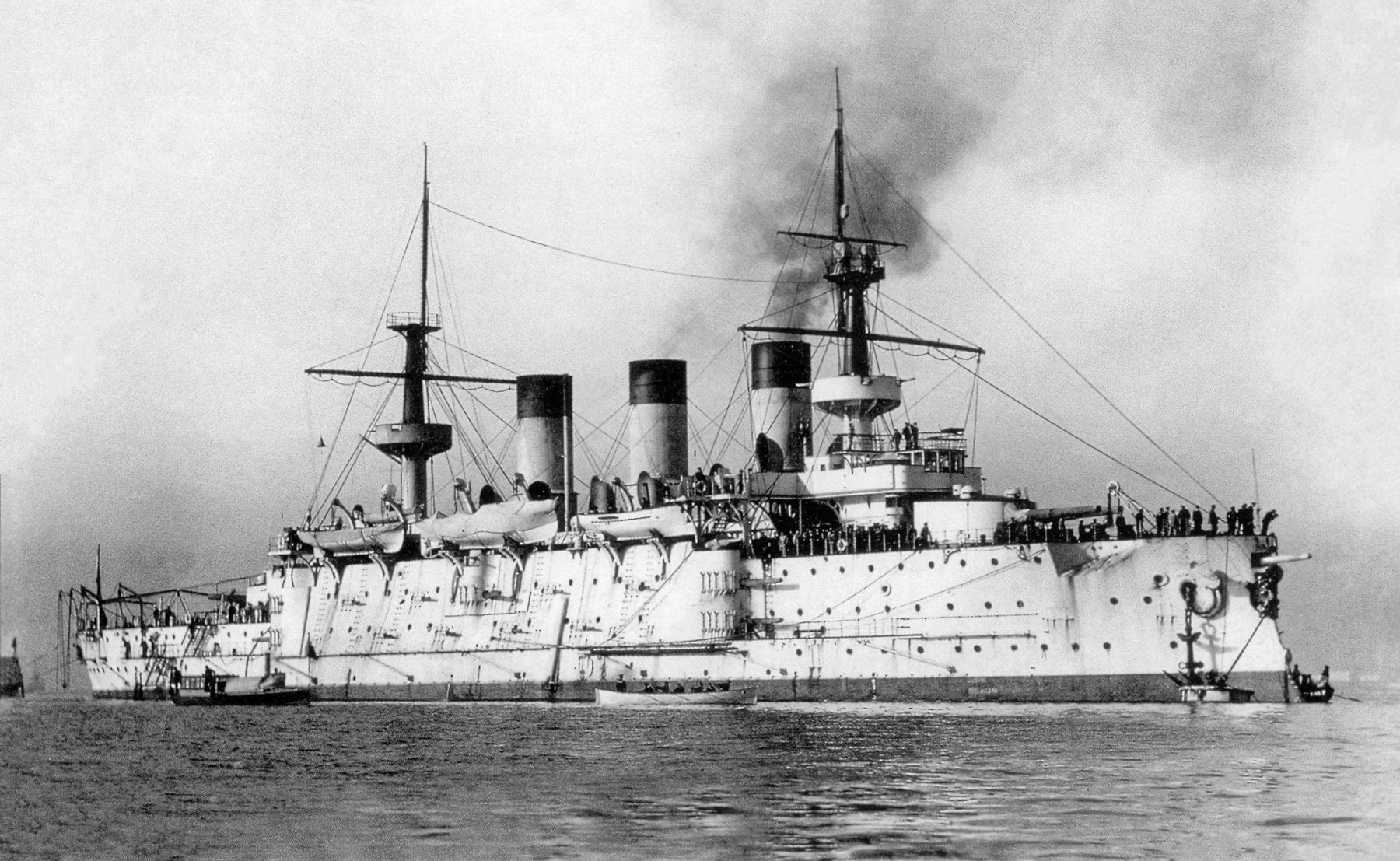
Peresvet in Toulon, 1901.

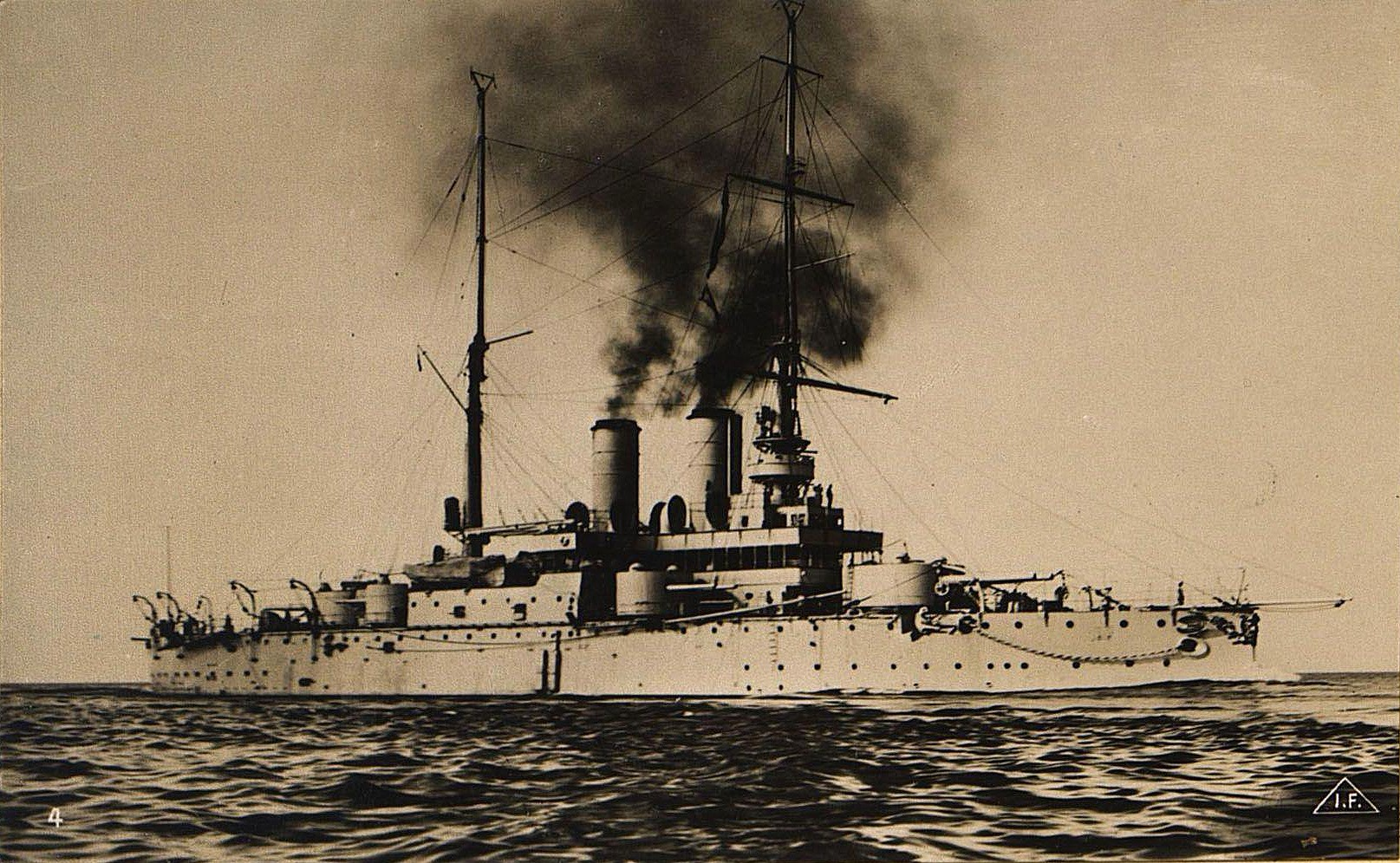
Rostislav.
