= Karp-class submarine =

Warship

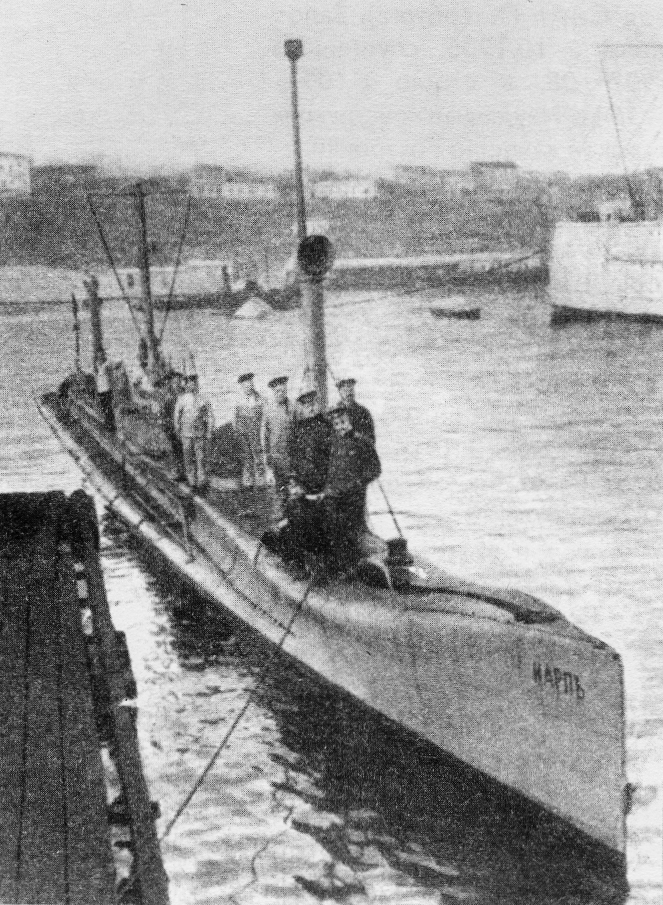
- Russian submarine Karp

Class overview
- Name: Karp class
- Builders: Germaniawerft
- Operators: Imperial Russian Navy; Ukrainian Navy
- In commission: 1907–1919
- Completed: 3
- Lost: 3

General characteristics
- Type: Submarine
- Displacement: 210 t (207 long tons) surfaced; 239 t (235 long tons) submerged
- Length: 39.6 m (129 ft 11 in)
- Beam: 2.7 m (8 ft 10 in)
- Draught: 2.5 m (8 ft 2 in)
- Propulsion: Kerosene-electric; 400 bhp (300 kW) kerosene; 200 hp (150 kW) electric; 2 shafts
- Speed: 10 knots (19 km/h) surfaced; 8.5 knots (15.7 km/h) submerged
- Range: 1,250 nmi (2,320 km)
- Test depth: 96 ft (29 m)
- Complement: 28
- Armament: 1 × 457 mm (18 in) torpedo tubes; 2 × torpedoes in Drzewiecki drop collars

The Karp class were a class of submarines built by Krupp Germaniawerft for the Imperial Russian Navy. The class, composed of three boats (Karp, Kambala, Karas) were ordered in the 1904 emergency programme as a result of the Russo-Japanese War. The design was a twin hull type powered by a kerosene-electric power plant with a 16-fathom (96 ft; 29 m) diving limit. The boats were delivered late for the war and transferred to the Black Sea Fleet by rail in 1908. In 1909, Kambala was lost. The other two submarines remained in service until their withdrawal in March 1917. They were taken over in April 1918 by the Ukrainian State before being captured by the German Empire in May and transferred to the British following the German surrender in November. The British scuttled Karp and Karas at Sevastopol in 1919 to prevent their capture by the Soviets.

== Description ==
The Karp class was of a twin-hulled design produced by Austrian-born Spanish engineer Raimundo Lorenzo de Equevilley Montjustín that had a surface displacement of 210 tonnes (207 long tons) and were 239 t (235 long tons) submerged. They were 39.6 metres (129 ft 11 in) long overall with a beam of 2.7 metres (8 ft 10 in) and a draught of 2.5 metres (8 ft 2 in). They had a complement of 28 officers and ratings. The design of the submarines was significantly affected by the requirement that the boats be manufactured in sections, to be transported by rail.

The submarines were powered by a kerosene-electric power plant driving two shafts. The shafts were of the fixed-revolution type and turned variable pitch propellers. The two kerosene-powered engines were rated at 298 kilowatts (400 bhp) and the two electric motors, 149 kilowatts (200 hp). Kerosene was chosen over gasoline as the fuel choice due to its better safety record. The submarines had a maximum speed of 10.8 knots (20.0 km/h; 12.4 mph) on the surface and 8.5 knots (15.7 km/h; 9.8 mph) submerged. They had a range of 1,250 nautical miles (2,320 km; 1,440 mi) on the surface and 50 nautical miles (93 km; 58 mi) submerged. The boats had 396 peat batteries, which were connected 6 in parallel and 66 in series.

The submarines had seven ballast and compensating tanks, and could dive to 16 fathoms (96 ft; 29 m). The fuel and some of the ballast tanks were located between the two hulls, the other ballast tanks and the compensating tanks were inside the pressure hull. The trim of the boat could also be regulated with manually moved weights. The hydroplanes were operated manually but the rudder had electrical steering. The pressure hull was made of 12 mm (0.47 in) thick steel, which were not placed on frames, but were riveted to cast iron rings for vertical support. This weakened the design and restricted the diving depth to 16 fathoms (96 ft; 29 m).

They were armed with one 457-millimetre (18.0 in) torpedo tube and two external Drzewiecki drop collars for torpedoes.

The design served as the prototype for the first German U-boat, U-1, which was commissioned into the Imperial German Navy on 14 December 1906.

== Boats in class ==
Karp-class submarines
Name	Builder	Launched	Commissioned	Fate
Karp (Карп)	Germaniawerft, Kiel	1907	2 October 1907	Scuttled at Sevastopol on 26 April 1919.
Kambala (Камбала)	Germaniawerft, Kiel	1907	2 October 1907	Sunk in collision with the battleship Rostislav, 11 June 1909.
Karas (Карась)	Germaniawerft, Kiel	1907	2 October 1907	Decommissioned in 1917. Scuttled at Sevastopol on 26 April 1919.

== Service history ==
Three submarines were ordered as part of the 1904 emergency building programme as part of the naval buildup of the Russo-Japanese War on 30 April 1904. A German design build and constructed in the German Empire, delivery of the engines led to construction delays, with the first submarine of the class only able to perform sea trials with her electric motors. The Karp class was only delivered to Russia in 1907, with the commissioning ceremony held at Kiel attended by Prince Dolgorukov. The submarines were transferred by rail to the Black Sea in 1908 and joined the Black Sea Fleet in anticipation of conflict with the Ottoman Empire. Further issues arose for the class when it was found that the rail deconstruction feature led to corrosion. The flanges, nuts and bolts that held the sections of the hull together corroded quickly in salt water which led to weakened hulls. By 1914, the submarines were instructed not to dive below 18.3 metres (60 ft). After joining the Black Sea Fleet, all three submarines of the Karp class were made part of a training squadron based at Sevastopol. The squadron would remain relatively unchanged until World War I.

Kambala sank in 1909. The reason and location of this sinking is unclear. Some reports have the submarine sinking near Kronstadt due to an erroneously opened valve while others have her sinking in an accidental collision with the Rostislav near Sevastopol on 11 June. In the Sevastopol sinking, 20 crew perished with only the commanding officer, who had been topside saved. It has even been suggested that she sank twice first near Kronstadt then after being salvaged was sunk again near Sevastopol. Parts of the wreck were raised later in 1909 and broken up for scrap. (Note: Friedman & Noot have the vessel salvaged and rebuilt.)

Karp and Karas remained in service throughout World War I until March 1917 when they were withdrawn from service and hulked at Sevastopol. After Romania's entry into the war on the side of the Allies, the submarines were based at Constanța in August 1916. They were withdrawn before the fall of the city to the Central Powers in October 1916. In April 1918, they were briefly taken over by the Ukrainian State before being captured by the German Empire in May. With the German surrender in November 1918, the submarines were turned over to the British. The submarines remained at Sevastopol during the Russian Civil War until 26 April 1919, when they were scuttled to prevent their capture by the Soviets.

== Sources ==
- Budzbon, Przemyslav (1986). "Russia". In Gardiner, Robert & Gray, Randal (eds.). Conway's All the World's Fighting Ships 1906–1921. Conway Maritime Press. pp. 291–325. ISBN 0-85177-245-5.
- Gray, Edwyn (2003). Disasters of the Deep: A Comprehensive Survey of Submarine Accidents & Disasters. Leo Cooper. ISBN 0-85052-987-5.
- Polmar, Norman & Noot, Jurrien (1991). Submarines of the Russian and Soviet Navies, 1718–1990. Naval Institute Press. ISBN 0-87021-570-1.
- Rössler, Eberhard (2001) [1981]. The U-boat: The Evolution and Technical History of German Submarines. Cassell. ISBN 0-304-36120-8.
- Showell, Jak (2006). The U-Boat Century: German Submarine Warfare 1906–2006. Chatham Publishing. ISBN 1-86176-241-0.
- Watts, Anthony J. (1990). The Imperial Russian Navy. Arms and Armour Press. ISBN 0-85368-912-1.
