= Admiral Ushakov-class coastal defense ship =

1890s Imperial Russian ship class

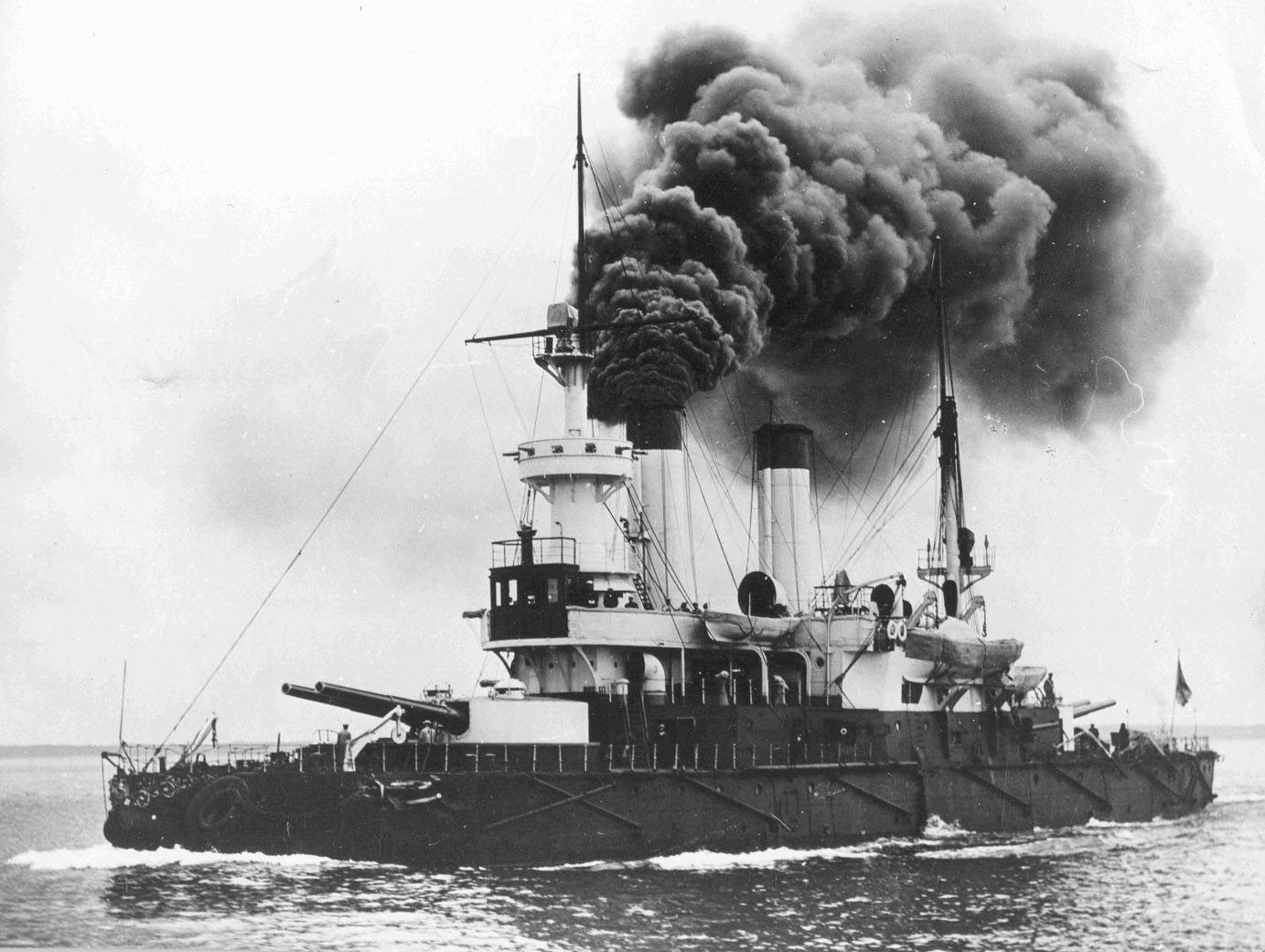
- Admiral Seniavin underway in 1901

Class overview
- Name: Admiral Ushakov class
- Builders: New Admiralty Shipyards and Baltic Works, Saint Petersburg, Russia
- Operators: Imperial Russian Navy; Imperial Japanese Navy
- Preceded by: Gangut
- Succeeded by: none
- Built: 1892–1899
- In commission: 1895–1935
- Planned: 3
- Completed: 3
- Lost: 1
- Scrapped: 2

General characteristics
- Type: Coastal defense ship
- Displacement: 4,971 long tons (5,051 t)
- Length: 87.3 m (286 ft 5 in)
- Beam: 15.85 m (52 ft 0 in)
- Draught: 5.9 m (19 ft 4 in)
- Propulsion: 2 shaft vertical triple expansion steam engines; 4-8 cylindrical coal-fired boilers; 4,290 kW (5,750 ihp); 450 tons coal
- Speed: 16 knots (30 km/h; 18 mph)
- Complement: 404
- Armament: 3 or 4 - 254 mm (10 in) guns; 4 × 1 - 120 mm (4.7 in) guns; 6 × 1 - 47 mm (2 in) 3-pounder guns; 10 × 1 - 37 mm (1.5 in) 1-pounder guns; 4 × 381 mm (15 in) above water torpedo tubes
- Armour: Harvey armour; Belt: 102–254 mm (4–10 in); Decks: 51–76 mm (2–3 in); Turrets: 203 mm (8 in); Conning tower: 203 mm (8 in)

The Admiral Ushakov class were coastal defense battleships built for the Imperial Russian Navy during the 1890s to counter armored ships of the Swedish Navy. All three ships were stationed in the Baltic Sea when the Russo-Japanese War began and sailed with the Baltic Fleet around the Cape of Good Hope to the Pacific. Two ships were captured by the Japanese and one was scuttled during the Battle of Tsushima.

== Design ==
=== General characteristics ===
They had an overall length of 87.33 metres (286 ft 6 in), a beam of 16 m (52 ft), and a draft of 5.9 m (19 ft 6 in) at deep load. They displaced 4,971 long tons (5,051 t).

=== Propulsion ===
The Admiral Ushakovs used vertical triple expansion steam engines that produced 4,290 kW (5,750 ihp). They were fed by 8 cylindrical coal-fired boilers, except in Admiral Ushakov which only had four boilers. The engines drove 2 shafts for a maximum speed of 16 knots (30 km/h; 18 mph). They carried 300 long tons (300 t) of coal at normal load and 450 long tons (460 t) at deep load.

=== Armament ===
The Admiral Ushakovs had four 45-caliber 250-millimetre (10 in) guns in two twin-gun turrets, mounted fore and after of the superstructure, except for General-Admiral Apraksin, whose rear turret only had a single gun. Their secondary armament consisted of four 120 mm (4.7 in) guns mounted in casemates at the corners of the superstructure.

=== Armor ===
Their armour consisted of a 254-millimetre (10 in) waterline belt 52 metres (170 ft) long that protected the ship's vitals. It tapered down to 102 millimetres (4 in) at the ends where it met bulkheads 152–203 millimetres (6–8 in) thick that protected the ends of the ship. The deck was 51–76 mm (2–3 in) thick. The turrets and the conning tower had 203 millimetres (8 in) of armour. Harvey armour was used throughout.

== Construction ==
Ship	Builder	Laid down	Launched	Commissioned	Fate
Admiral Ushakov	New Admiralty Shipyards	1 January 1892	1 November 1893	February 1895	Scuttled following surface action, 28 May 1905
Admiral Seniavin	Baltic Works	August 1892	22 August 1894	1896	Captured by Japan, 28 May 1905; renamed Mishima
General-Admiral Apraksin	New Admiralty Shipyards	24 October 1894	12 May 1896	1899	Captured by Japan, 28 May 1905; renamed Okinoshima

== In service ==
=== Russo-Japanese War ===
The three Admiral Ushakovs were assigned to the 3rd Pacific Squadron, under the command of Rear-Admiral Nikolai Nebogatov, and sailed on 2 February 1905 to reinforce Admiral Zinovy Rozhestvensky's 2nd Pacific Squadron en route to the Pacific. They left the Baltic Sea and sailed around Europe, through the length of the Mediterranean Sea, through the Suez Canal, across the Indian Ocean, into the South China Sea where they rendezvoused at Van Fong in French Indochina on 26 April. They departed the anchorage on 1 May and encountered the Japanese fleet on 14 May at what would be called the Battle of Tsushima.

For most of the first part of the battle Nebogatov's ships trailed the more powerful 2nd Squadron and were largely ignored by the Japanese so his ships were in good shape when night fell. Admiral Seniavin had not been hit at all, although Admiral Ushakov had had her bow smashed. He had ordered his ships to turn north to make for Vladivostok earlier in the day, after Admiral Rozhestvensky had been wounded, but he ordered a turn to the southwest to evade Japanese torpedo boats during the evening, but turned north during the night. Admiral Ushakov could not make the required speed to keep up and fell out. She was either sunk or scuttled by her crew during the following morning. Admiral Seniavin and General-Admiral Apraksin remained with him and surrendered the following morning when he was spotted by the Japanese fleet.

== Bibliography ==
- Gardiner, Robert, ed. (1979). Conway's All the World's Fighting Ships 1860–1905. New York: Mayflower Books. ISBN 0-8317-0302-4.
- Gribovskii, V. Y.; Chernikov, I. I. (1996). Battleship Admiral Ushakov (in Russian). Saint Petersburg, Russia: Zamechatelʹnye korabli. ISBN 5-7355-0356-1. OCLC 36969945.
- Pleshakov, Constantine (2002). The Tsar's Last Armada. New York: Basic Books. ISBN 0-465-05791-8.
