= Russian battleship Oslyabya =

Russian Peresvet-class battleship

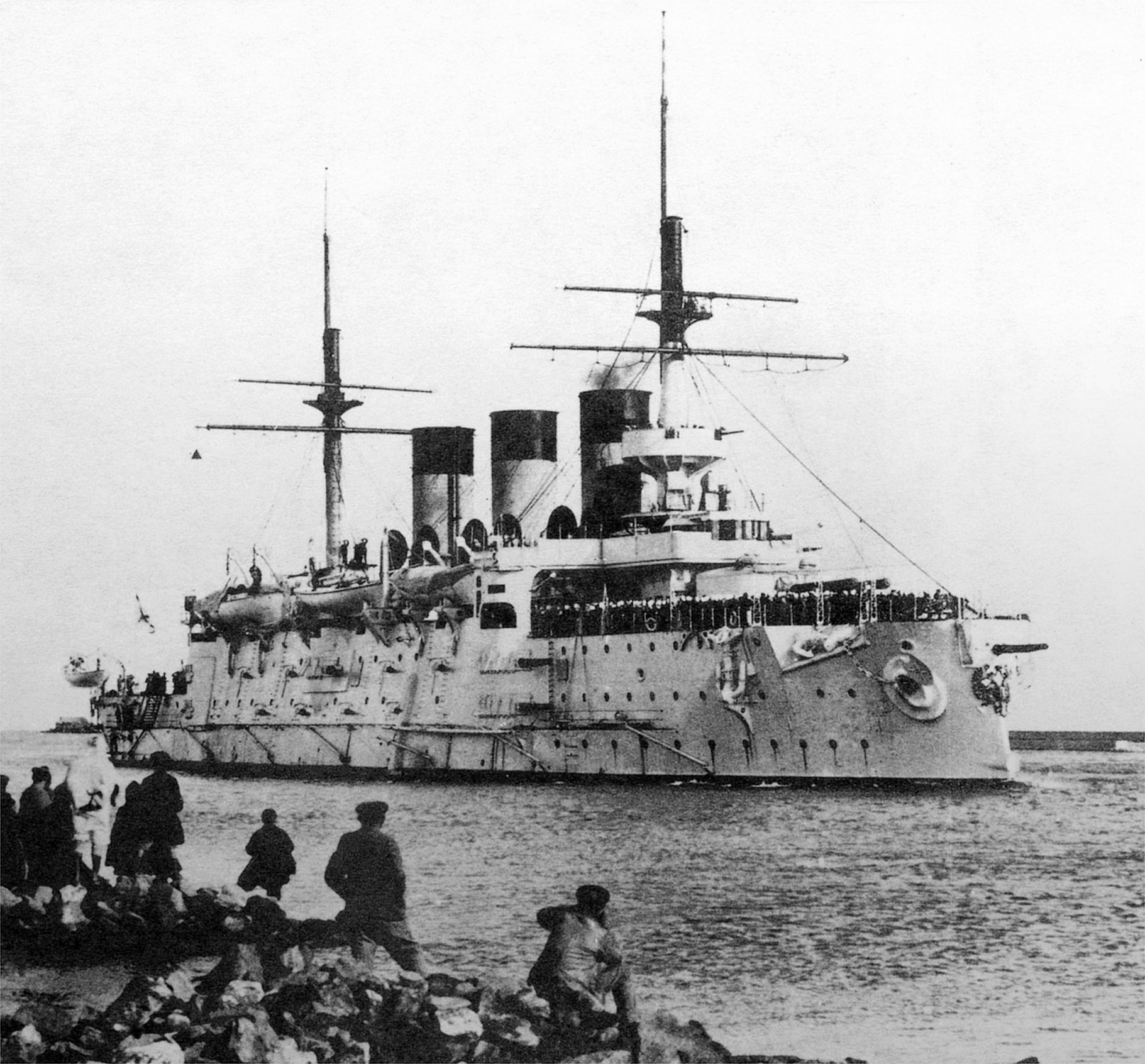
- Oslyabya leaving Bizerte, French Tunisia, 1903

History

Russian Empire
- Name: Oslyabya
- Namesake: Rodion Oslyabya
- Builder: New Admiralty Shipyard, Saint Petersburg
- Cost: 11,340,000 rubles
- Laid down: 21 November 1895 (Note: All dates used in this article are New Style.)
- Launched: 8 November 1898
- In service: 1903
- Fate: Sunk at the Battle of Tsushima, 27 May 1905

General characteristics
- Class & type: Peresvet-class pre-dreadnought battleship
- Displacement: 14,408 long tons (14,639 t)
- Length: 434 ft 5 in (132.4 m)
- Beam: 71 ft 6 in (21.8 m)
- Draft: 26 ft 3 in (8.0 m)
- Installed power: 30 Belleville boilers; 14,500 ihp (10,813 kW)
- Propulsion: 3 shafts, 3 triple-expansion steam engines
- Speed: 18 knots (33 km/h; 21 mph)
- Range: 6,200 nmi (11,500 km; 7,100 mi) at 10 knots (19 km/h; 12 mph)
- Complement: 27 officers, 744 enlisted men
- Armament: 2 × twin 10 in (254 mm) guns; 11 × single 6 in (152 mm) guns; 20 × single 75 mm (3 in) guns; 20 × single 47 mm (1.9 in) guns; 8 × single 37 mm (1.5 in) guns; 5 × 15 in (381 mm) torpedo tubes; 45 mines
- Armor: Belt: 4–9 inches (102–229 mm); Deck: 2–3 inches (51–76 mm); Turrets: 9 inches (229 mm)

Oslyabya (Russian: Ослябя) was the second of the three Peresvet-class second-class pre-dreadnought battleships built for the Imperial Russian Navy at the end of the nineteenth century, although construction delays meant that she was the last to be completed. The ship was part of the Second Pacific Squadron sent to the Far East during the Russo-Japanese War of 1904–05, and served as the flagship of Rear Admiral Baron Dmitry von Fölkersam. Oslyabya was sunk on 27 May 1905 at the Battle of Tsushima, and was the first all-steel battleship to be sunk by naval gunfire alone. Sources differ on the exact number of casualties, but over half her crew went down with the ship.

== Design and description ==
The design of the Peresvet class was inspired by the British second-class battleships of the Centurion class. The British ships were intended to defeat commerce-raiders like the Russian armored cruisers Rossia and Rurik; the Peresvet-class ships were designed to support the Russian cruisers. This role placed a premium on high speed and long range at the expense of heavy armament and armor.

Oslyabya had a length of 434 feet 5 inches (132.4 m) overall, a beam of 71 feet 6 inches (21.79 m) and a draft of 26 feet 3 inches (8.0 m). Designed to displace 12,674 long tons (12,877 t), she was almost 2,000 long tons (2,000 t) overweight and displaced 14,408 long tons (14,639 t) when built. Her crew consisted of 27 officers and 744 enlisted men. The ship was powered by three vertical triple-expansion steam engines using steam generated by 30 Belleville boilers. The engines were rated at 14,500 indicated horsepower (10,800 kW), using forced draft, and designed to reach a top speed of 18 knots (33 km/h; 21 mph). Oslyabya, however, reached a top speed of 18.33 knots (33.95 km/h; 21.09 mph) from 15,051 indicated horsepower (11,224 kW) during her sea trials in September 1902. She carried a maximum of 2,060 long tons (2,090 t) of coal which allowed her to steam for 6,200 nautical miles (11,500 km; 7,100 mi) at a speed of 10 knots (19 km/h; 12 mph).

The ship's main battery consisted of four 10-inch (254 mm) guns mounted in two twin-gun turrets, one forward and one aft of the superstructure. The secondary armament consisted of eleven Canet 6-inch (152 mm) quick-firing (QF) guns, mounted in casemates on the sides of the hull and in the bow, underneath the forecastle. Smaller guns were carried for defense against torpedo boats. These included twenty 75-millimeter (3.0 in) QF guns, twenty 47-millimeter (1.9 in) Hotchkiss guns and eight 37-millimeter (1.5 in) guns. She was also armed with five 15-inch (381 mm) torpedo tubes, three above water and two submerged. The ship carried 45 mines to be used to protect her anchorage.

Oslyabya's waterline armor belt consisted of Harvey armor and was four to nine inches (102 to 229 mm) thick. The belt was 7 feet 9 inches (2.4 m) high, of which the upper 36 inches (910 mm) was intended to be above the waterline, but the ship was significantly overweight and only had three inches (76 mm) showing at normal load. At full load, the belt was completely submerged and her only protection was the four-inch upper belt. The Krupp cemented armor of her gun turrets had a maximum thickness of nine inches and her deck ranged from two to three inches (51 to 76 mm) thick.

== Construction and career ==
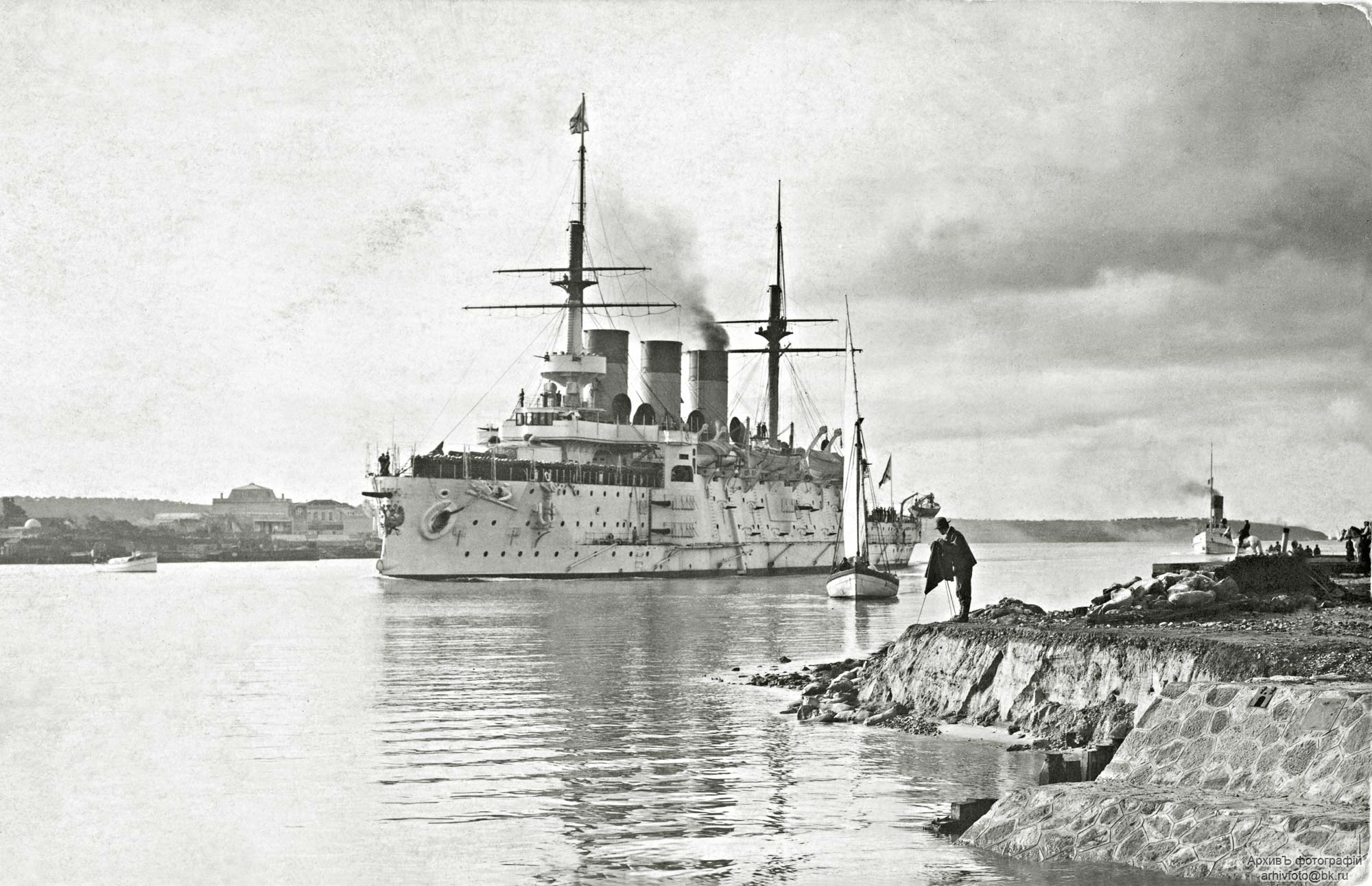
Oslyabya leaving Bizerte, 9 January 1904

Oslyabya, named for Rodion Oslyabya, a 14th-century monk of the Troitse-Sergiyeva Lavra and a hero of the Battle of Kulikovo in 1380, was laid down on 21 November 1895 by the New Admiralty Shipyard in Saint Petersburg and launched on 8 November 1898. Problems at the New Admiralty Shipyard delayed her completion until 1903 at a cost of 11,340,000 rubles. The ship sailed for Port Arthur on 7 August 1903 with the armored cruiser Bayan, but Oslyabya ran aground in the Strait of Gibraltar on 21 August and was under repair until late November, first in Algeria, then at La Spezia, Italy. After repairs, the ship resumed her voyage to the Far East, but she was recalled to join the Baltic Fleet on 12 February 1904, following the start of the Russo-Japanese War three days previously. After arrival at St. Petersburg in April, Oslyabya was fitted with 4.5-foot (1.4 m) Barr & Stroud rangefinders, telescopic gun sights, a new ventilation system, and Telefunken radio equipment.

=== Russo-Japanese War ===
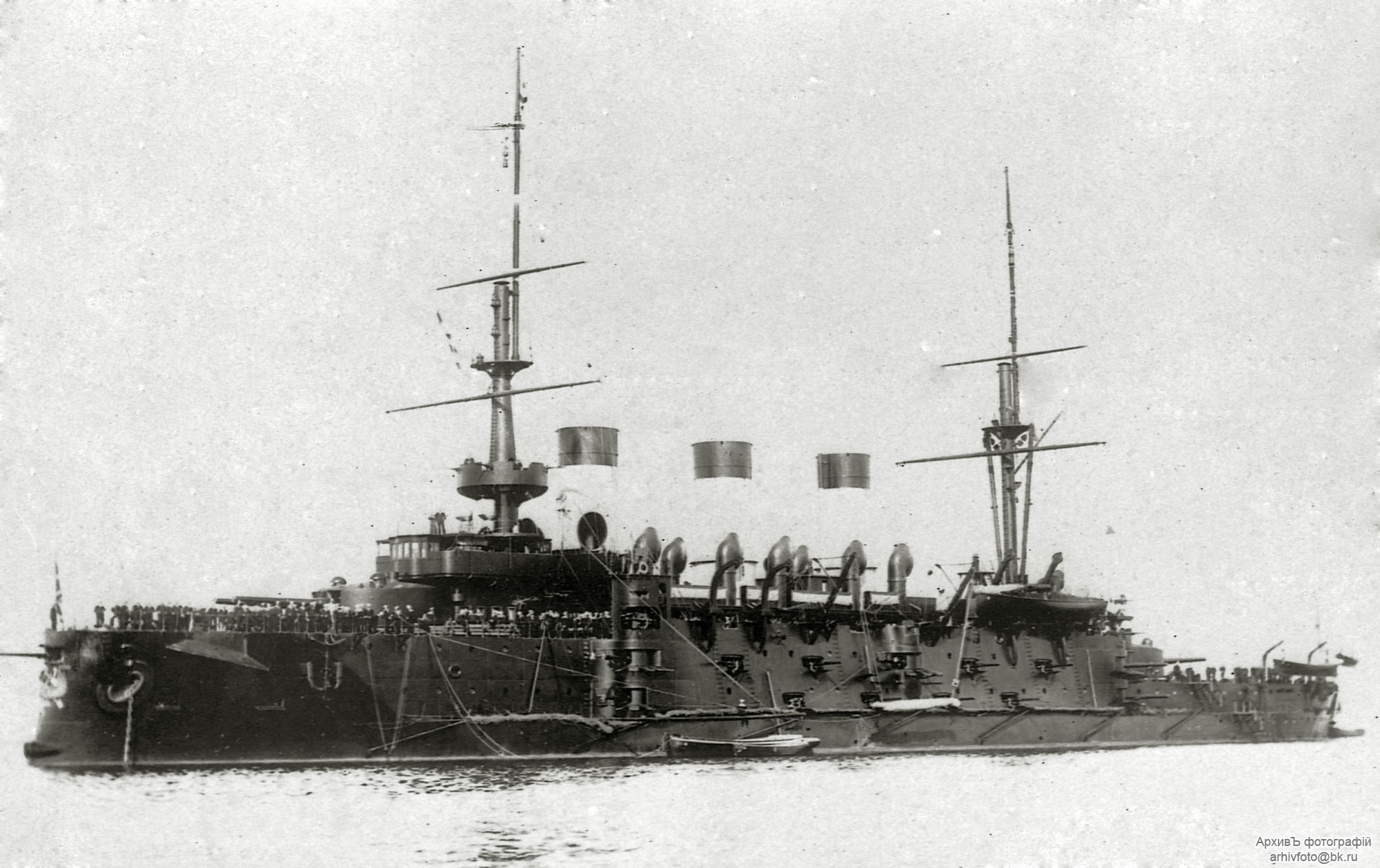
Oslyabya leaving Revel, 1904

The Russian strategy since 1897 had been for ships from the Baltic Fleet to be ordered to the Far East if war with Japan broke out, while the First Pacific Squadron in Port Arthur would avoid a general fleet battle until reinforcements arrived. On 15 October 1904, Oslyabya set sail for Port Arthur from Libau as Rear Admiral Baron Dmitry von Fölkersam's flagship, along with the other vessels of the Second Pacific Squadron, under the overall command of Vice Admiral Zinovy Rozhestvensky. Historian Mark Schrad said that: "This epic 18,000-mile (29,000 km) journey was the longest voyage of a coal-powered battleship fleet in history." En route to Denmark, the battleship was slightly damaged when the destroyer Buistri collided with her. When his ships reached the port of Tangier, Morocco, on 28 October, Rozhestvensky ordered his older battleships, under the command of von Fölkersam, to go through the Mediterranean and Red Sea to rendezvous with his main force in Madagascar. Rozhestvensky led his squadron, including Oslyabya, down the Atlantic coast of Africa, rounding the Cape of Good Hope, and reached the island of Nosy Be off the northwest coast of Madagascar on 9 January 1905, where they remained for two months while Rozhestvensky finalized his coaling arrangements. By this time Port Arthur had surrendered to the Japanese and he could not count on resupplying there, nor rendezvousing with the First Pacific Squadron. Rozhestvensky's reunited squadron sailed for Camranh Bay, French Indochina, on 16 March and reached it almost a month later to await the obsolete ships of the Third Pacific Squadron, commanded by Rear Admiral Nikolai Nebogatov. These reached Camranh Bay on 9 May and the combined force sailed for Vladivostok on 14 May.

En route, Rozhestvensky reorganized his ships into three tactical divisions for the forthcoming battle; the first consisted of the four new Borodino-class battleships commanded by himself, von Fölkersam commanded the Second Division that consisted of the battleships Oslyabya, Navarin, Sissoi Veliky and the armored cruiser Admiral Nakhimov, and Nebogatov retained his ships as the Third Division. Von Fölkersam, ill with cancer, died on 26 May and Rozhestvensky decided not to inform the fleet in order to keep morale up. Oslyabya's Captain 1st Rank Vladimir Ber became the commander of the Second Division, while Nebogatov had no idea that he was now the squadron's de facto second-in-command.

While figures are not available for Oslyabya, one Russian account after the battle said that the Borodinos were approximately 1,700 long tons (1,700 t) overweight as they were overloaded with coal and other supplies that were stored high in the ships, reducing their stability. Oslyabya's main armor belt was fully submerged with a full load, much less any additional coal and supplies, and thus the four-inch-thick upper armor was the only available protection for the ship's waterline.

==== Battle of Tsushima ====
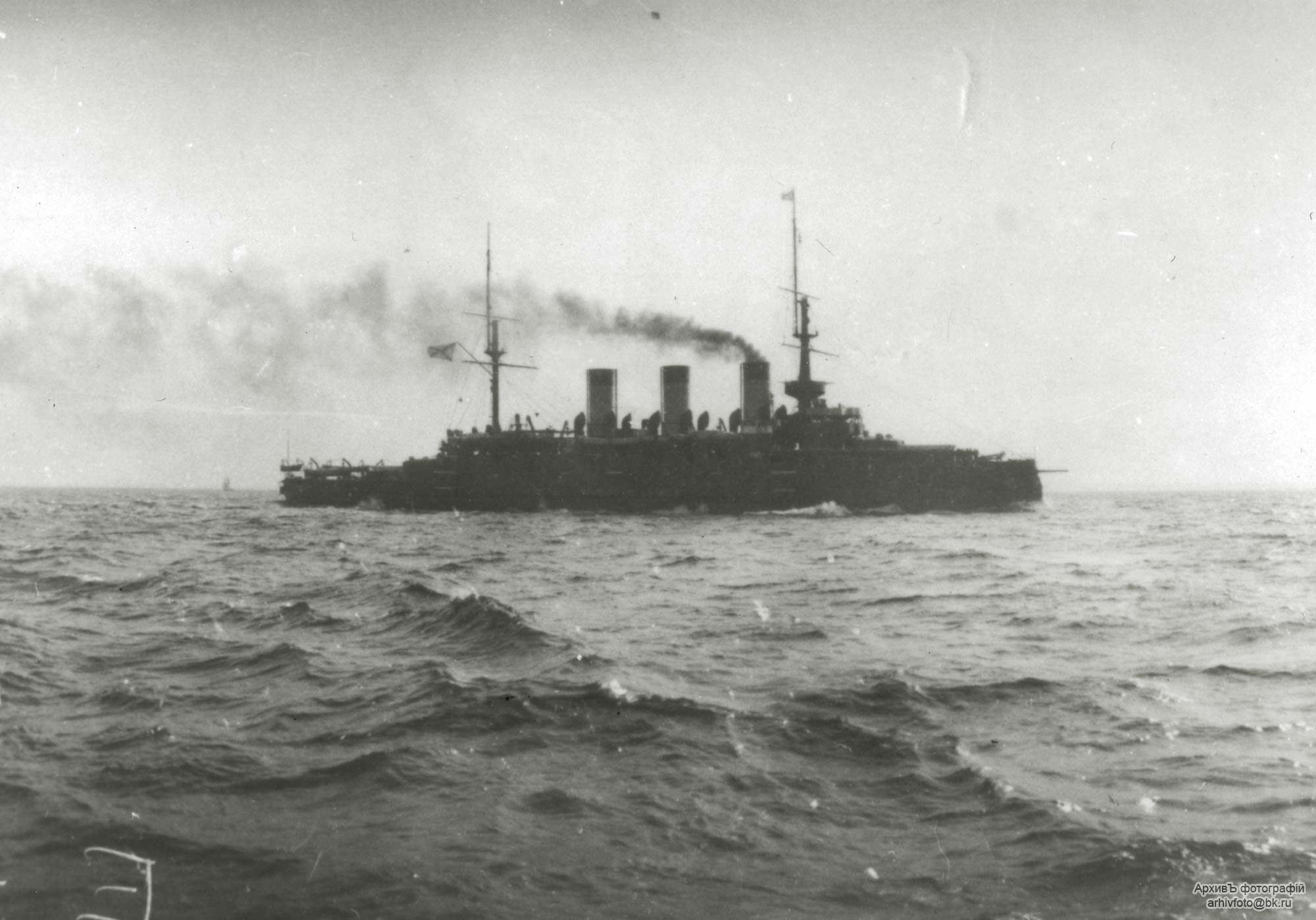
Oslyabya at sea, en route to Japan, 1905

The Russians were spotted early on the morning of 27 May by Japanese ships as they entered the Korea Strait en route to Vladivostok. During the subsequent battle Oslyabya led the Second Division of the squadron and was initially the target of at least two battleships and a pair of armored cruisers when the Japanese opened fire at 14:10. As the Japanese approached, Rozhestvensky ordered the fleet to move from line ahead formation to parallel columns and Oslyabya was forced to almost stop in her tracks to avoid hitting the battleship Oryol, the last ship of Rozhestvensky's division, as she maneuvered. Almost immediately, the shells began inflicting damage, knocking out the rangefinder, wounding the gunnery officer and severing the cables connecting the guns to the Geisler fire-control system. Other hits shot away the mainmast and knocked out the forward gun turret as well as three of the port six-inch guns. Splinters from one of the many hits entered her conning tower, killing the quartermaster and wounding most of the men inside. This caused the ship to fall out of line to starboard and she was engaged by six Japanese armored cruisers at short range. More serious were several large-caliber shells that struck along the ship's waterline about 15 minutes into the engagement that caused major flooding; they opened up enough of the ship's bow to the sea that her forward motion forced more and more water into her hull and she began listing to port. Flooding of her starboard forward magazine was ordered in an attempt to counteract the list, but it just added more weight forward and destroyed the ship's stability. Oslyabya's list increased to 12 degrees at 14:20, flooding many of the lower turrets. Her funnels touched the water around 15:10 and Ber ordered "abandon ship". The ship sank a few minutes later with her starboard propeller still turning, first all-steel battleship to be sunk by naval gunfire alone, taking Ber and 470 of her crew with her. (Note: Neither Forczyk nor McLaughlin provide figures for the number of survivors, while Campbell says that 385 survivors were rescued by Russian destroyers and 514 men went down with the ship. Krestyaninov gives 376 men rescued, but 5 of those were later killed aboard the destroyer Bravii and another 22 aboard the armored cruiser Dmitrii Donskoi.)
