= Russian coast defense ship Admiral Seniavin =

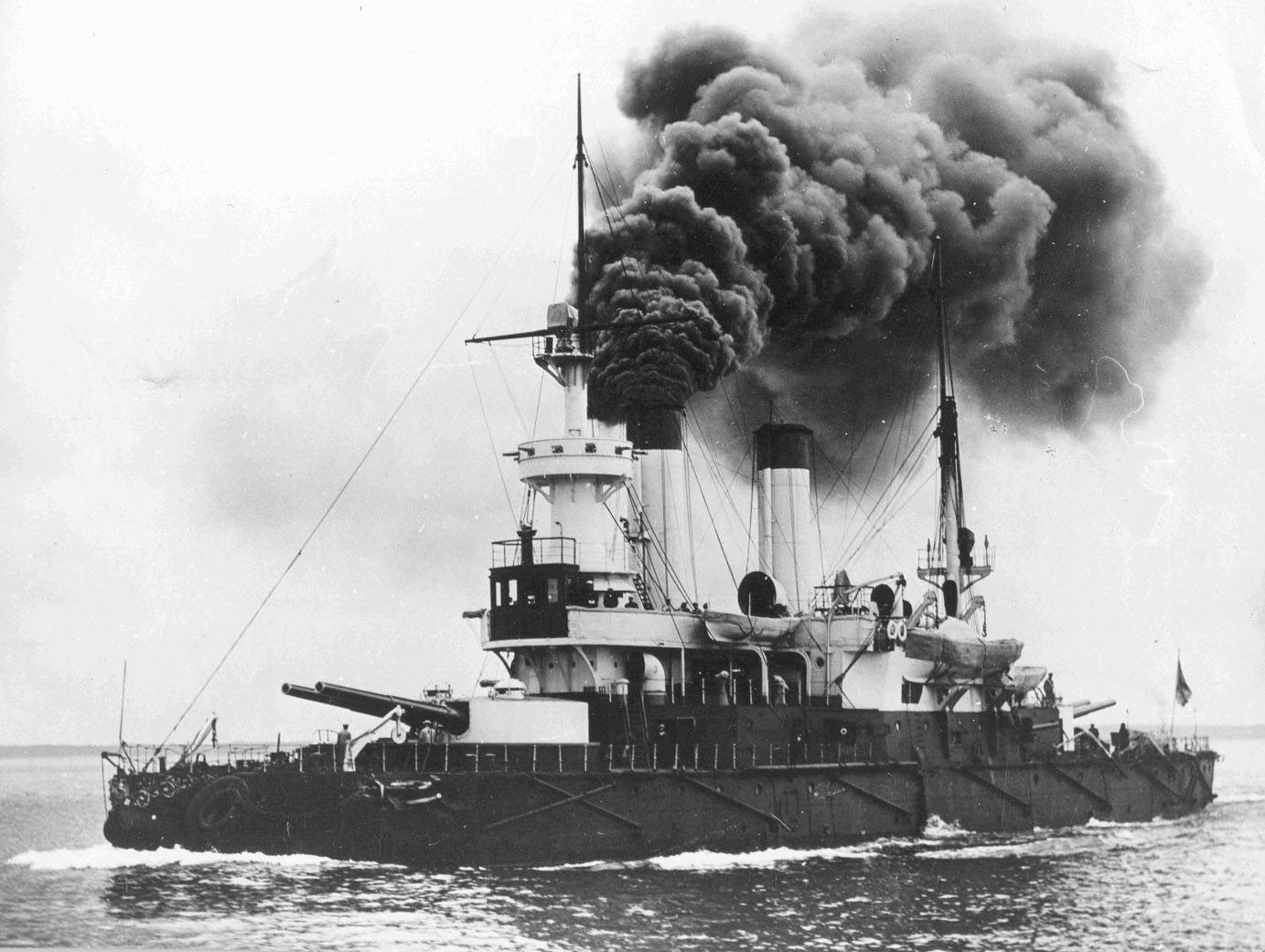
- The Russian coastal defense battleship Admiral Senyavin, which later became Mishima.

History

Russian Empire
- Name: Admiral Senyavin
- Builder: Baltic Works, Saint Petersburg, Russia
- Laid down: 2 August 1892
- Launched: 22 August 1894
- Commissioned: 1896
- Stricken: 28 May 1905
- Fate: Prize of war to Japan

Japan
- Name: Mishima
- Acquired: 1905
- Commissioned: 6 June 1905
- Stricken: 10 October 1935
- Fate: Sunk as target, 5 May 1936

General characteristics
- Class & type: Admiral Ushakov-class coastal defense ship
- Displacement: 4,165 long tons (4,232 t) normal; 4,270 long tons (4,339 t) max
- Length: 84.6 m (277 ft 7 in) w/l
- Beam: 15.88 m (52 ft 1 in)
- Draught: 5.49 m (18 ft 0 in)
- Propulsion: Two Shaft VTE steam engine, 5,250 shp (3,910 kW); 4 boilers
- Speed: 16 knots (30 km/h)
- Range: 260 tons coal; 3,000 nautical miles (6,000 km) at 10 knots (19 km/h)
- Complement: 406
- Armament: As built: 4 × 254 mm (10 in) guns 4 × 120 mm (4.7 in) guns 10 × 47 mm (1.9 in) guns 12 × 37 mm (1.5 in) guns 4 × 450 mm (18 in) torpedo tubes As Mishima: 4 × 254 mm (10 in) guns 6 × 152 mm (6.0 in) guns 2 × 47 mm (1.9 in) Hotchkiss guns
- Armour: Belt: 250 mm (9.8 in); Deck: 75 mm (3 in); Turret: 200 mm (7.9 in)

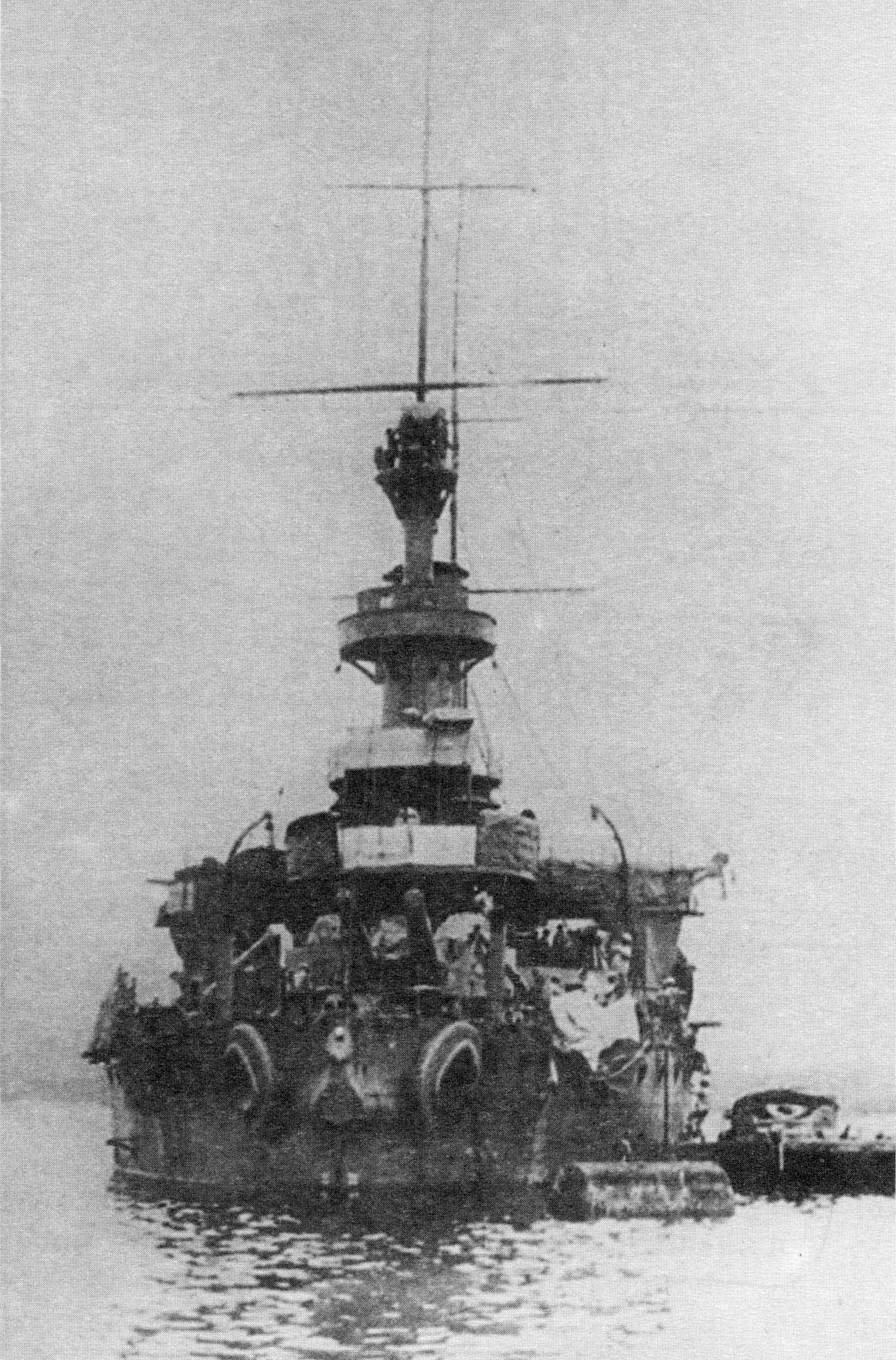
Mishima in 1905

Admiral Seniavin (Russian: Адмирал Сенявин), was an Admiral Ushakov-class coastal defense ship built for Imperial Russian Navy during the 1890s. She was one of eight Russian pre-dreadnought battleships captured by the Imperial Japanese Navy from the Russians during the Russo-Japanese War of 1904–1905. She subsequently served in the Japanese Navy under the name Mishima (見島) until sunk as a target in 1936.

== In Russian service ==
Initially assigned to the Russian Baltic Fleet, she was later reclassed as a coastal defence ship.

The three obsolete Ushakovs (Admiral Ushakov, General Admiral Graf Apraksin, and Admiral Senyavin) were rejected for inclusion in the Second Pacific Squadron assembled by Admiral Zinovy Rozhestvensky to reinforce the existing Russian squadron based at Port Arthur after the outbreak of the Russo-Japanese War as Rozhestvensky felt they were unsuitable for such an extreme blue-water operation. Nevertheless, all three were selected to form part of Admiral Nebogatov's Third Pacific Squadron which was subsequently sent out to reinforce Rozhestvensky on his journey to the Far East after political agitation following his departure. This Third Pacific Squadron transited the Suez Canal and the two Russian squadrons rendezvoused at Cam Ranh Bay after a cruise that became known as the "Voyage of the Damned", and from there Rozhestvensky set course through the South China Sea towards the Korea Strait, where they were discovered by the Japanese.

At the resulting Battle of Tsushima (27–28 May 1905), the three ships survived the first phase of the engagement on the evening of 27 May largely due to the Japanese concentrating their efforts on Rozhestvensky's modern battleships (concentrated in the First and Second Divisions of the Russian squadron) and their subsequent almost-total destruction left the Russian fleet in tatters. Nebogatov's Third Division was largely able to keep itself together during the night, although Admiral Seniavin's sister ship Admiral Ushakov strayed from formation and was sunk by the Japanese. The morning of 28 May found the Russian survivors surrounded by an apparently undamaged Japanese force, and Nebogatov surrendered. Thus Admiral Seniavin and General Admiral Graf Apraksin were captured as prizes of war.

== Japanese service ==
General Admiral Graf Apraxin was commissioned into the Imperial Japanese Navy under the name Okinoshima and Admiral Seniavin became the second-class coastal defense vessel Mishima. Mishima was named for the small island of Mishima, offshore from Hagi in Yamaguchi prefecture, not far from the location of the Battle of Tsushima. Mishima retained her original four 10-inch 45 caliber guns, six 6-inch 40 caliber Armstrong Z guns and two 47 mm guns.

Mishima was part of the Japanese Second Fleet in World War I, participating in the Battle of Tsingtao against the small number of Imperial German Navy ships left behind by Admiral von Spee's East Asia Squadron.

After the end of the war, Mishima supported the Japanese Siberian Intervention against the Bolshevik Red Army in eastern Russia by covering the landings of Japanese forces, and by acting as an icebreaker to keep the sea lanes between Japan and Vladivostok open.

On 1 April 1921, Mishima was re-classified as a submarine tender.

Mishima was decommissioned on 10 October 1935. She was sunk as a target by aircraft from the aircraft carrier Hōshō on 5 May 1936 off Toino Misaki (Cape Toi), Miyazaki Prefecture, Japan, at 31.364556°N 131.347389°E.

== See also ==
- List of battleships of Japan
