= Russian ship Poltava =

At least seven ships of the Imperial Russian and Soviet Navies have been named Poltava after the Russian victory in the Battle of Poltava:

- Russian ship of the line Poltava (1712) - 52-gun ship of the line
- Russian ship of the line Poltava (1743) - 66-gun ship of the line
- Russian ship of the line Poltava (1754) - 66-gun ship of the line
- Russian ship of the line Poltava (1808) - 110-gun ship of the line
- Russian ship of the line Poltava (1820) - 84-gun ship of the line
- Russian battleship Poltava (1894) - Petropavlovsk-class pre-dreadnought battleship captured by the Japanese during the Russo-Japanese War of 1904–05, sold back to the Russians during World War I, renamed Chesma as there was a new Poltava in the Russian Navy, and ultimately scrapped by the Soviets in 1924
- Russian battleship Poltava (1911) - Gangut-class battleship that participated in World War I and World War II before being scrapped in 1949
