= Russian coast defense ship Admiral Ushakov =

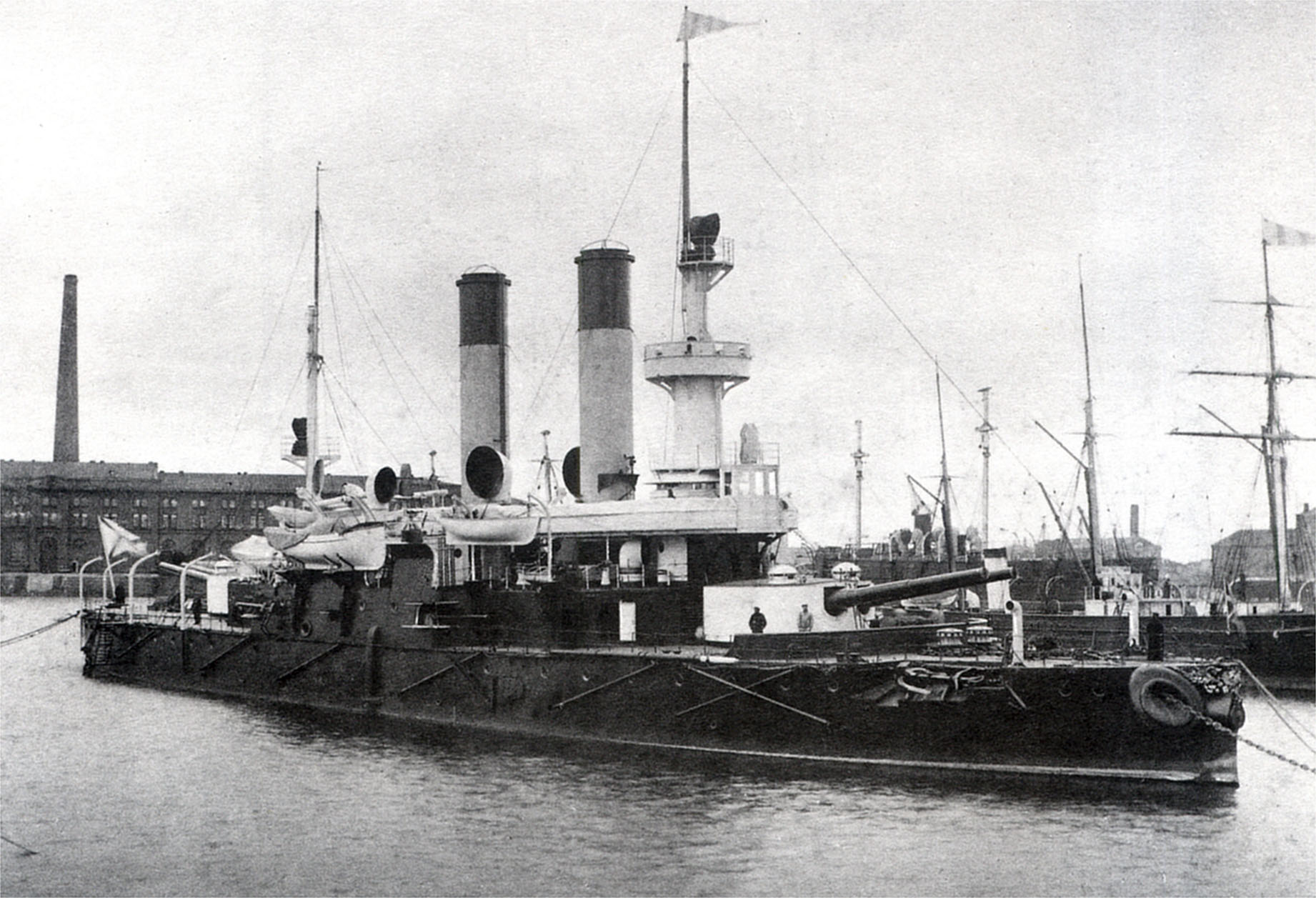
- Admiral Ushakov in 1897

History

Russian Empire
- Name: Admiral Ushakov
- Builder: New Admiralty Shipyards, Saint Petersburg, Russia
- Laid down: 1 January 1892
- Launched: 1 November 1893
- Completed: January 1895
- Commissioned: February 1895
- Fate: Scuttled during Battle of Tsushima, 28 May 1905

General characteristics
- Class & type: Admiral Ushakov-class coastal defense ship
- Displacement: 4,971 long tons (5,051 t)
- Length: 87.3 m (286 ft 5 in)
- Beam: 15.85 m (52 ft 0 in)
- Draught: 5.9 m (19 ft 4 in)
- Propulsion: 2 shaft Reciprocating VTE steam engines; 8 cylindrical coal-fired boilers; 5,750 shp (4,290 kW); 450 tons coal
- Speed: 16 knots (30 km/h; 18 mph)
- Complement: 404
- Armament: 4 × 255 mm (10 in) guns (2×2); 4 × 120 mm (4.7 in) guns (1×4); 6 × 47 mm (2 in) 3-pounder guns; 10 × 37 mm (1.5 in) 1-pounder guns; 4 × 381 mm (15 in) torpedo tubes
- Armour: Belt: 254 mm (10 in); Deck: 75 mm (3 in); Turrets: 200 mm (8 in); Conning tower: 200 mm (8 in)

Admiral Ushakov was the lead ship in her class of armoured warships (coastal battleships) of the Imperial Russian Navy, and named after Admiral Fyodor Fyodorovich Ushakov the Russian naval commander of the 18th century.

== Service life ==
Admiral Ushakov was part of the Baltic Fleet at the beginning of the Russo-Japanese War. Admiral Ushakov was chosen to form part of Admiral Nikolai Nebogatov's Third Pacific Squadron which was sent out to reinforce Admiral Zinovy Rozhestvensky on his journey to the Far East. The ship was obsolete and was not considered suitable for a voyage to the Pacific. However the Admiralty insisted on including Admiral Ushakov and her sister ships General Admiral Graf Apraksin and Admiral Seniavin to bolster their force. Journeying via the Suez Canal and across the Indian Ocean, they linked up with Rozhestvensky's fleet off Cam Ranh Bay in Indochina and proceeded together to the Straits of Tsushima.

At the Battle of Tsushima, on 27–28 May 1905, Admiral Ushakov was separated from Nebogatov during the night and fought to the last. She was surrounded by Japanese ships and demanded to surrender by Admiral Shimamura Hayao. Admiral Ushakov's commanding officer Captain Miklukha refused to surrender and ordered the ship's company to fight. The ship was sunk within forty minutes and her crew subsequently massacred in the water before the Japanese ceased fire and rescued the remaining survivors.
