= Russian coast defense ship General-Admiral Apraksin =

Admiral Ushakov-class coastal defense ship

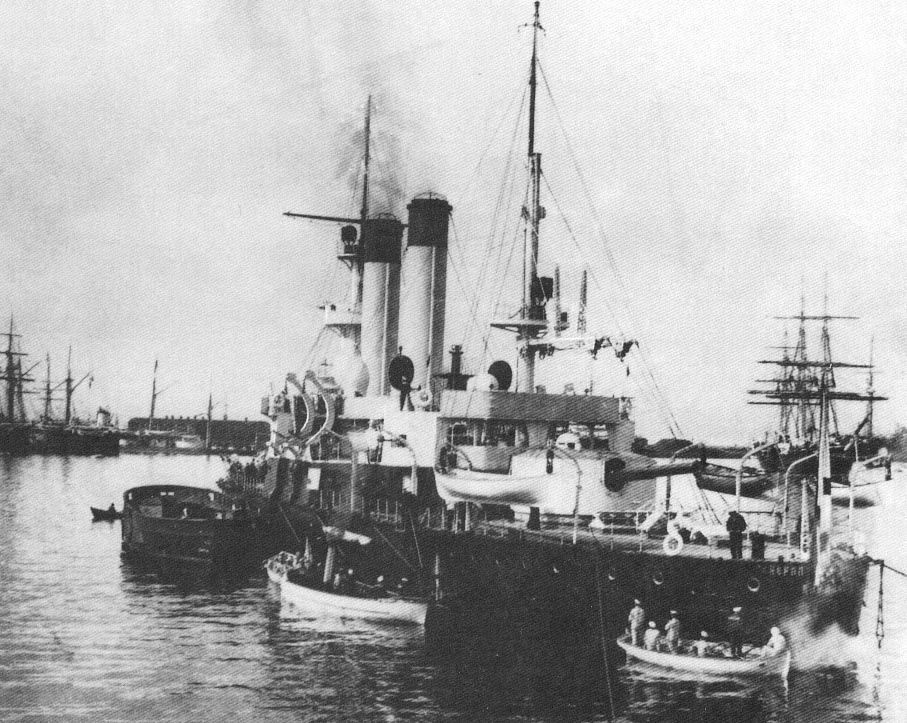
- The Russian coastal battleship General-Admiral Apraksin, which later became the Japanese Okinoshima

History

Russian Empire
- Name: General-Admiral Apraksin
- Builder: New Admiralty Works, Saint Petersburg, Russia
- Laid down: 24 October 1894
- Launched: 12 May 1896
- Commissioned: 1899
- Stricken: 28 May 1905
- Fate: Prize of war to Japan

Japan
- Name: Okinoshima
- Acquired: 1905
- Commissioned: 6 June 1905
- Decommissioned: 1 April 1922
- Stricken: 1924
- Fate: Sold 1925, Memorial ship; Scrapped, September 1939

General characteristics
- Class & type: Admiral Ushakov-class coastal defense ship
- Displacement: 4,165 tons (normal); 4,270 tons (max)
- Length: 80.62 m (264.5 ft) at waterline
- Beam: 15.85 m (52.0 ft)
- Draught: 5.18 m (17.0 ft)
- Propulsion: Two Shaft VTE steam engine, 6,000 shp (4,470 kW); 4 boilers
- Speed: 15 knots (28 km/h)
- Range: 313 tons coal; 3,000 nautical miles (6,000 km) at 10 knots (19 km/h)
- Complement: 406
- Armament: As built: 3 × 254 mm (10 in) guns 4 × 120 mm (4.7 in) guns 10 × 47 mm (1.9 in) guns 12 × 37 mm (1.5 in) guns 4 × 450 mm (18 in) torpedo tubes As Okinoshima: 3 × 254 mm (10 in) guns 6 × 152 mm (6.0 in) guns 2 × 47 mm (1.9 in) Hotchkiss guns
- Armour: Belt: 250 mm (9.8 in); Deck: 75 mm (3 in); Turret: 200 mm (7.9 in)

General-Admiral Apraksin (Russian: Генералъ-Адмиралъ Апраксинъ), sometimes transliterated as Apraxin, was a member of the Admiral Ushakov-class coastal defense ships of the Imperial Russian Navy. She was named after General Admiral Fyodor Matveyevich Apraksin, the first commander of Russian Baltic Fleet. She was one of eight Russian pre-dreadnought battleships captured by the Imperial Japanese Navy during the Russo-Japanese War of 1904-1905. She subsequently served in the Japanese Navy as Okinoshima (沖ノ島) until removed from service in 1922.

She had only three guns (a single gun turret aft, as shown in the photograph), instead of her sister ships, which were equipped with four guns.

== Russian service ==
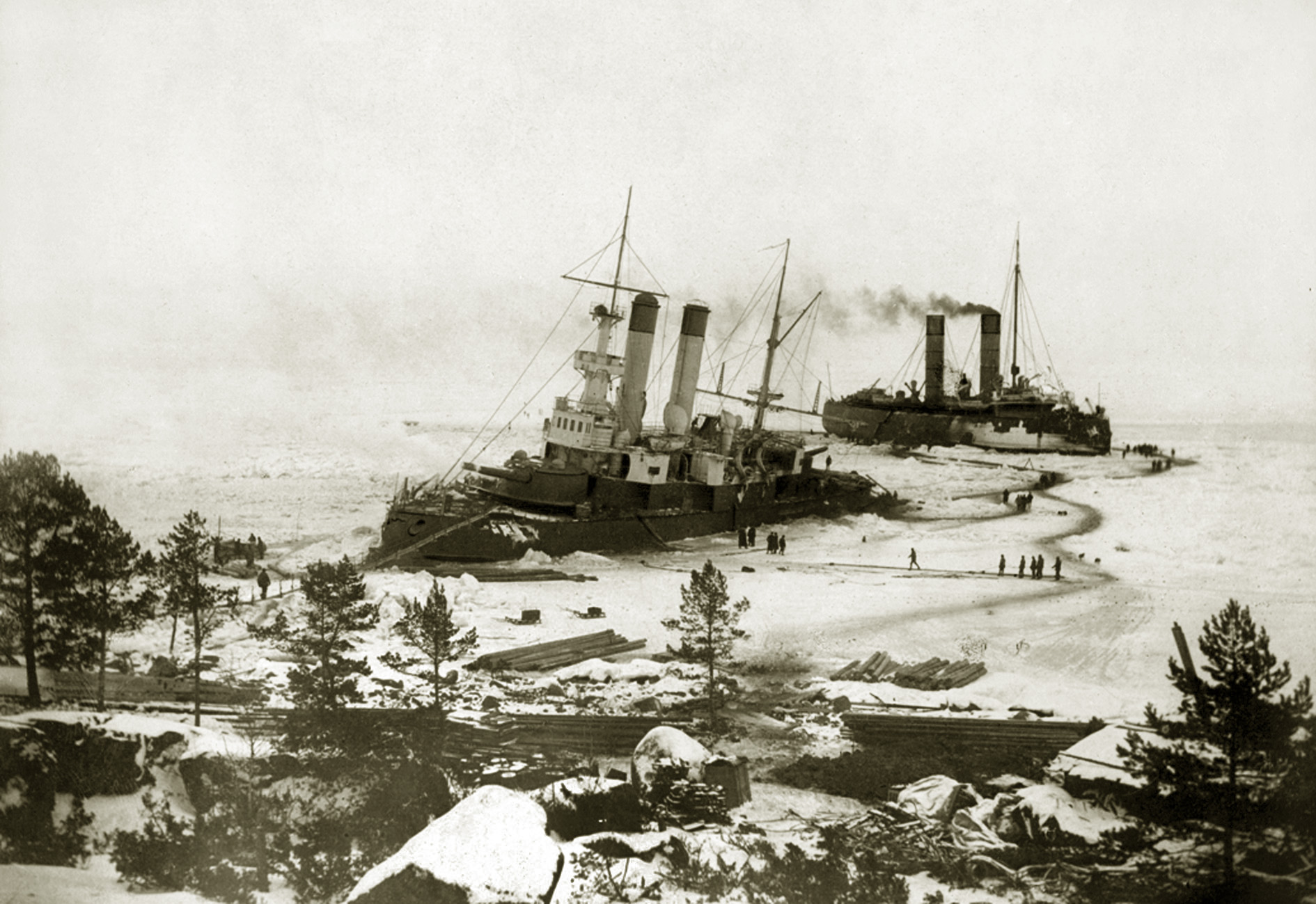
General-Admiral Apraksin aground on Hogland Island, with the icebreaker Yermak on site to assist

In November 1899, shortly after entering service with the Baltic Fleet, General-Admiral Apraksin ran aground on Hogland Island in the Gulf of Finland. It was hoped that the ship could be salvaged, as a similar incident in 1897 had cost the Russian Navy another battleship, Gangut. General-Admiral Apraksin's crew were ordered to remain aboard to maintain the ship as best they could when the Gulf froze over for the winter.

On the recommendation of radio pioneer A.S. Popov the ship's crew established a radio station on the island to maintain communication with the fleet's headquarters at Kronstadt (via a station at Kymi) in January 1900, after several weeks' delay. Meanwhile, Rear-Admiral Zinovy Rozhestvensky was assigned to lead the salvage operations. The results of the grounding were such that attempting to tow General-Admiral Apraksin free would likely leave her irreparable and in danger of foundering, and instead Rozhestvensky employed a civilian mining corporation to remove the rocks holding General-Admiral Apraksin with small explosive charges. Assisting the salvage efforts was the icebreaker Yermak. Rozhestvensky initially had doubts as to the usefulness of Yermak, but she proved her value during the operation, which was successfully concluded in the first part of May. After General-Admiral Apraksin was freed she was towed back to Kronstadt for the necessary repairs.

Later, General-Admiral Apraksin and her two sister ships, Admiral Ushakov and the Admiral Seniavin were reclassed as coastal defence ships.

== The Russo-Japanese War ==
The three Ushakovs were rejected for inclusion in the Second Pacific Squadron assembled by Admiral Rozhestvensky to reinforce the existing Russian squadron based at Port Arthur after the outbreak of the Russo-Japanese War as Rozhestvensky felt they were unsuitable for such an extreme blue-water operation. Nevertheless, all three were selected to form part of Admiral Nebogatov's Third Pacific Squadron which was subsequently sent out to reinforce Rozhestvensky on his journey to the Far East after political agitation following his departure. The two Russian squadrons finally met and united at Cam Ranh Bay after a cruise that became known as the "Voyage of the Damned", and from there Rozhestvensky set course through the South China Sea towards the Korea Strait, where they were discovered by the Japanese.

At the resulting Battle of Tsushima (27–28 May 1905), the three ships survived the first phase of the engagement on the evening of 27 May largely due to the Japanese concentrating their efforts on Rozhestvensky's modern battleships (concentrated in the First and Second Divisions of the Russian squadron) and their subsequent almost-total destruction left the Russian fleet in tatters. Nebogatov's Third Division was largely able to keep itself together during the night, although Apraksin's sister ship Admiral Ushakov strayed from formation and was sunk by Japanese torpedoes. The morning of 28 May found the Russian survivors surrounded by an apparently undamaged Japanese force, and Nebogatov surrendered. Thus Apraksin and Admiral Seniavin were captured as prizes of war.

== Japanese service ==
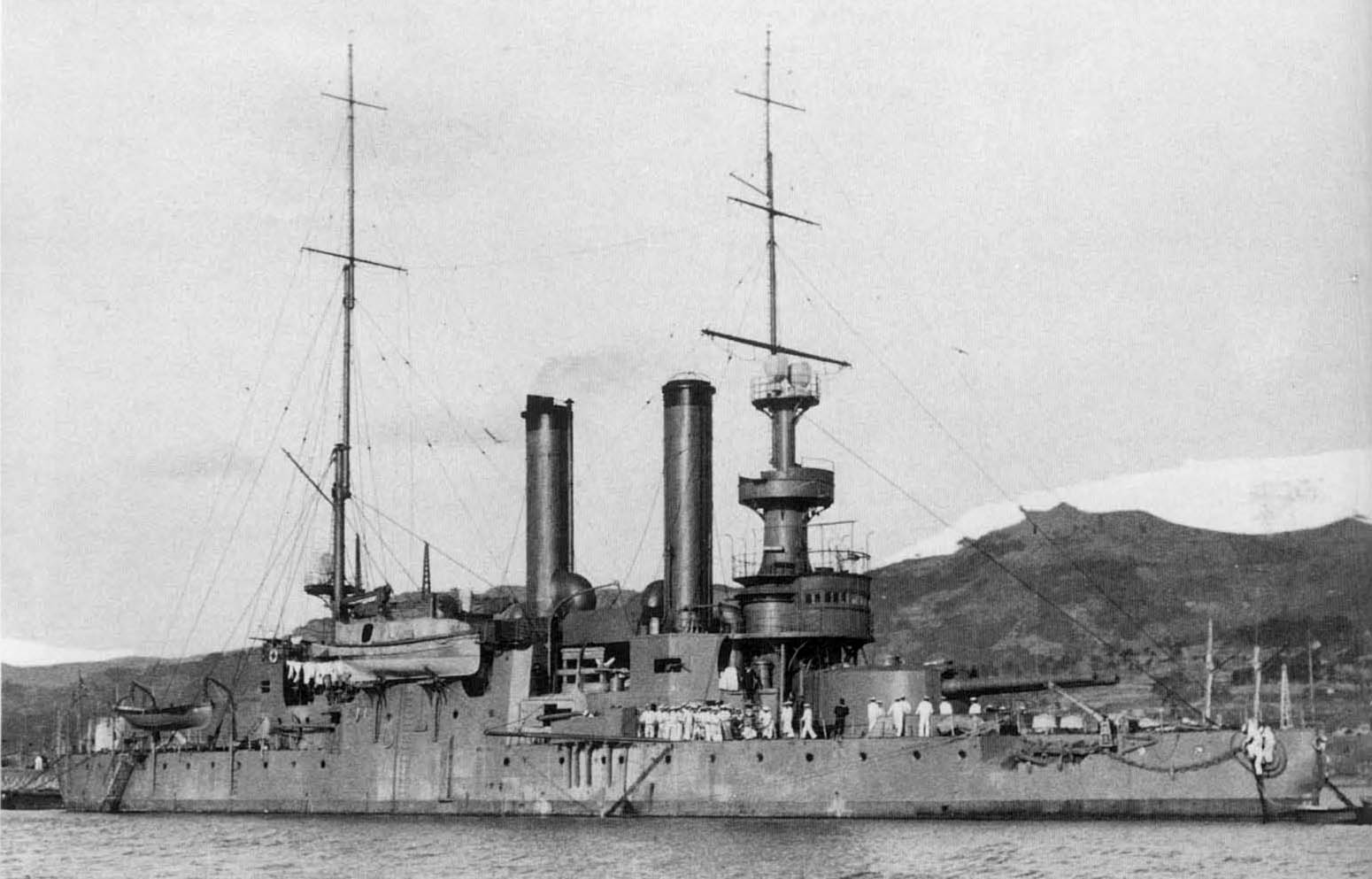
Okinoshima

Admiral Senyavin became Mishima and General-Admiral Apraksin was commissioned into the Imperial Japanese Navy as the 2nd class coastal defense vessel Okinoshima. Okinoshima was named for the small island of Munakata, Fukuoka Prefecture, which is the site of a famous Shinto shrine, and which is also geographically close to the location of the Battle of Tsushima. Okinoshima retained her original three 10-inch 45 caliber guns, six 6-inch 40 caliber Armstrong Z guns and two 47mm guns.

Okinoshima was part of the Japanese Second Fleet at the outbreak of the First World War, participating in the Battle of Tsingtao against the small number of German ships left behind by Admiral von Spee's East Asia Squadron.

On 1 April 1921, Okinoshima was re-classified as a submarine tender. Okinoshima was decommissioned on 1 April 1922, used as a training ship for Sasebo Marine Corp, stricken on 1924, and was sold as monument in 1925 to "Battle of the Sea of Japan War Relic Preservation Committee", which planned on transforming her into a memorial ship located at Tsuyazaki, Fukuoka, commemorating the Japanese victory at the Battle of Tsushima. The ship floated aground and was severely damaged in a storm, and was scrapped in 1939.

The battleship Okinoshima should not be confused with the Pacific War era minelayer of the same name.

== See also ==
- List of battleships of Japan
