= Nikolai Nebogatov =

Imperial Russian Navy admiral

Nikolai Ivanovich Nebogatov
- Николай Иванович Небогатов
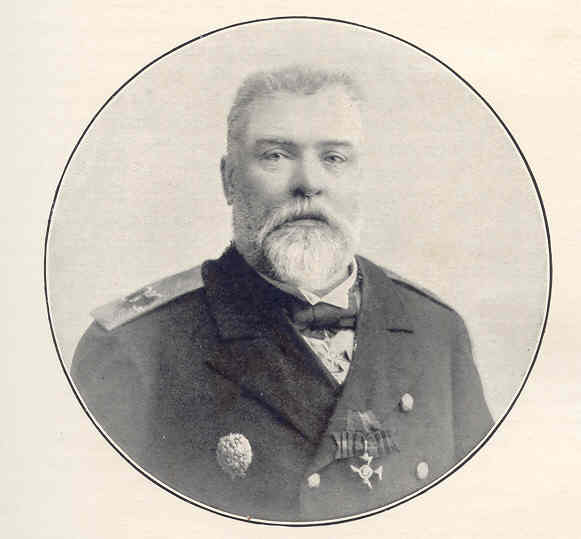
- Nikolai Nebogatov
- Born: April 20, 1849
- Died: August 4, 1922 (aged 73); Moscow, Russian SFSR
- Military career
- Allegiance: Russian Empire
- Branch: Imperial Russian Navy
- Service years: 1869–1905
- Rank: Rear admiral
- Commands: 3rd Pacific Squadron
- Conflicts: Russo-Japanese War

Nikolai Ivanovich Nebogatov (Russian: Николай Иванович Небогатов; occasionally transliterated as Nebogatoff; April 20, 1849 – August 4, 1922) was a rear admiral in the Imperial Russian Navy, noted for his role in the final stages of the Russo-Japanese War of 1904–1905.

== Biography ==
Nebogatov was born into the family of a career naval officer in the vicinity of St Petersburg and graduated from the Sea Cadets Corps in 1869. He was promoted to lieutenant in 1874. In 1882–86 he was executive officer aboard the cruiser Razboinik and in 1888 was given command of the gunboat Groza, followed in 1889, by the gunboat Grad. He was in command of numerous Russian warships during his career, including the cruisers Krejs, Admiral Nakhimov (1896), and Minin. He was then appointed head of naval artillery training for the Russian Baltic Fleet, and was promoted to rear admiral in 1901.

During the Russo-Japanese War, the bulk of the Russian Baltic Fleet was renamed the "Second Pacific Squadron", and set sail under the command of Admiral Zinovy Rozhestvensky on an epic journey to relieve the Russian Pacific Fleet, trapped at the Battle of Port Arthur by the Imperial Japanese Navy. Largely for political reasons, calls were made for a "Third Pacific Squadron", consisting of mostly obsolete cruisers and coastal defence battleships to supplement the Second Pacific Squadron. Realizing that the ships were highly unsuited for the task, and faced with untrained crews, a number of Russian admirals refused the command; however, Nebogatov accepted the challenge. Despite several incidents of sabotage by pro-revolutionary or anarchist elements within the crews, Nebogatov sailed in February 1905 with the old battleship Imperator Nikolai I (as flagship), cruiser Vladimir Monomakh, and coastal-defense battleships Admiral Ushakov, Admiral Seniavin, and General Admiral Graf Apraksin, as well as numerous transport ships. The squadron passed through the Suez Canal and crossed the Indian Ocean to rendezvous with the Second Pacific Squadron at Cam Ranh Bay, French Indochina. Rozhestvensky, who had opposed the sailing of the Third Pacific Squadron from the beginning, did not share with him his future strategy and routing even at this late date, and also neglected to advise him of the death of Admiral Dmitry von Fölkersahm on May 24, an event which effectively made Nebogatov second-in-command of the fleet after Rozhestvensky.

During the first day of the Battle of Tsushima on May 27, 1905, the Japanese fleet concentrated its efforts against the Second Pacific Squadron, so Nebogatov's ships survived the fate of Rozhestvensky's battleships. With Rozhestvensky seriously wounded, and most of the Second Pacific Squadron's warships sunk or lost, Nebogatov took over command. After facing repeated torpedo attacks during the night, the remaining Russian warships assembled around Imperator Nikolai I. However, on sighting the main Japanese fleet on the morning of May 28, he realized that his ships were no match for the Japanese fleet, and that the Russian cruiser division under Admiral Oskar Enkvist would not arrive in time to prevent his annihilation. Over the objections of most of his officers, Nebogatov accepted Admiral Togo Heihachiro's terms, signing an instrument of surrender aboard Togo's flagship, the battleship Mikasa, and turning over control of the remaining battleships Imperator Nikolai I, Oryol, General Admiral Graf Apraxin, and Admiral Senyavin to the Japanese. However, Captain Vasili Fersen of the cruiser Izumrud disobeyed orders and escaped through the Japanese lines. The captain of the battleship Admiral Ushakov, having become lost during the night, was unaware of the orders to surrender, and was sunk the next morning, out-gunned and outnumbered, by the Japanese fleet.

Nebogatov was taken as a prisoner of war by the Japanese, and while a prisoner was dishonorably discharged by the Russian Admiralty and stripped of his titles of nobility. On his return to Russia, he and 77 of his subordinate officers were arrested and taken before a court martial in December 1906. Nebogatov's defense that his defective ships, guns and ammunition would have resulted in the meaningless slaughter of his men was rejected, and Nebogatov and three of his captains were sentenced to death by firing squad on December 25, 1906. However, the sentences were commuted to 10 years in prison by order of Tsar Nicholas. He was released from the prison fortress of Sts. Peter and Paul in May 1909, when he was pardoned on the occasion of the tsar's birthday.

Nebogatov subsequently moved to Moscow, where he died in 1922. He was married to Nadezhda Petrova, with whom he had two daughters and one son. However, the author of The Tsar's Last Armada, Constantine Pleshakov, claims he died in 1934.
