= Battle of Tsushima order of battle =

Paths taken by portions of the Russian Baltic Fleet to Vladivostok

This is the order of battle of the Japanese and Russian fleets at the Battle of Tsushima on 27–28 May 1905. The utter destruction of Russian naval power at Tsushima was the climactic action of the Russo-Japanese War.

The Russian fleet had suffered such attrition from Japanese mines and combat with the Japanese fleet during 1904 that the Russian high command made the fateful decision to dispatch the Baltic Fleet in October of that year to the Pacific coast base at Vladivostok. This involved an exhausting voyage of over seven months; those ships that went down the Atlantic, around Cape of Good Hope, across the Indian Ocean and up the China Sea eventually covered 17,000 mi (27,000 km) before ending in disaster as the fleet attempted to transit Tsushima Strait.

Vice-Admiral Zinovy Rozhestvensky, in command of the Russian fleet, rejected the idea of circling the Japanese home islands to the east as impractical and instead drove straight through Tsushima Strait as the most direct route to Vladivostok. Admiral Tōgō Heihachirō, in command of the Japanese fleet, was waiting in port at Busan on the Korean coast.

Despite the devastation of its navy, Russia could have continued the war. For their part, the Japanese did not want to reveal how much they had been weakened by wartime expenditures and agreed to a settlement negotiated by U.S. President Theodore Roosevelt at Portsmouth, New Hampshire.

== Japanese Combined Fleet ==
=== First Squadron ===
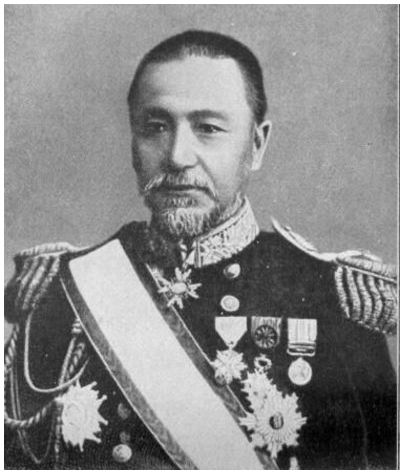
Admiral Togo in 1907

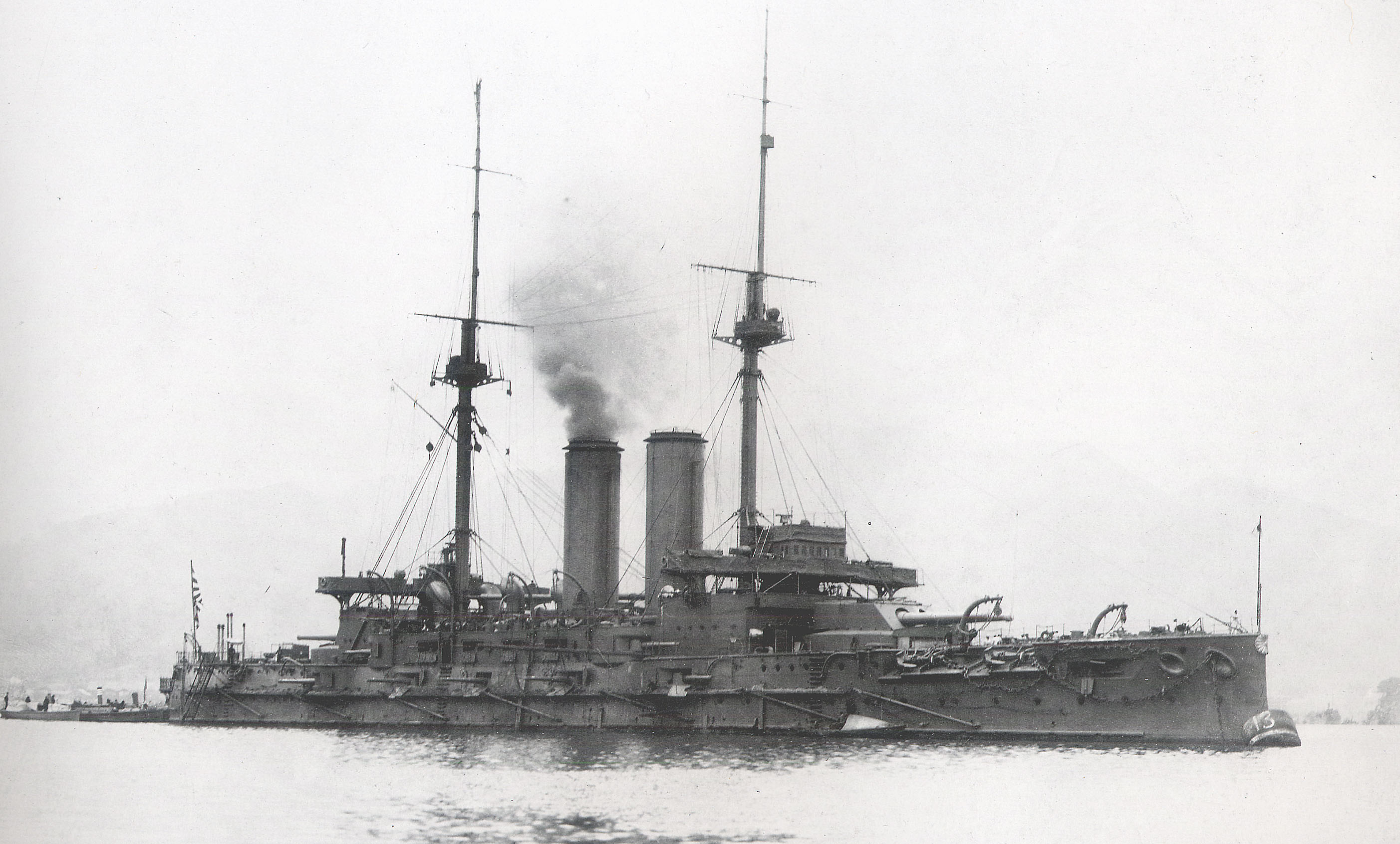
Flagship of the Imperial Japanese Fleet, battleship Mikasa at Kure Naval Base near the city of Hiroshima

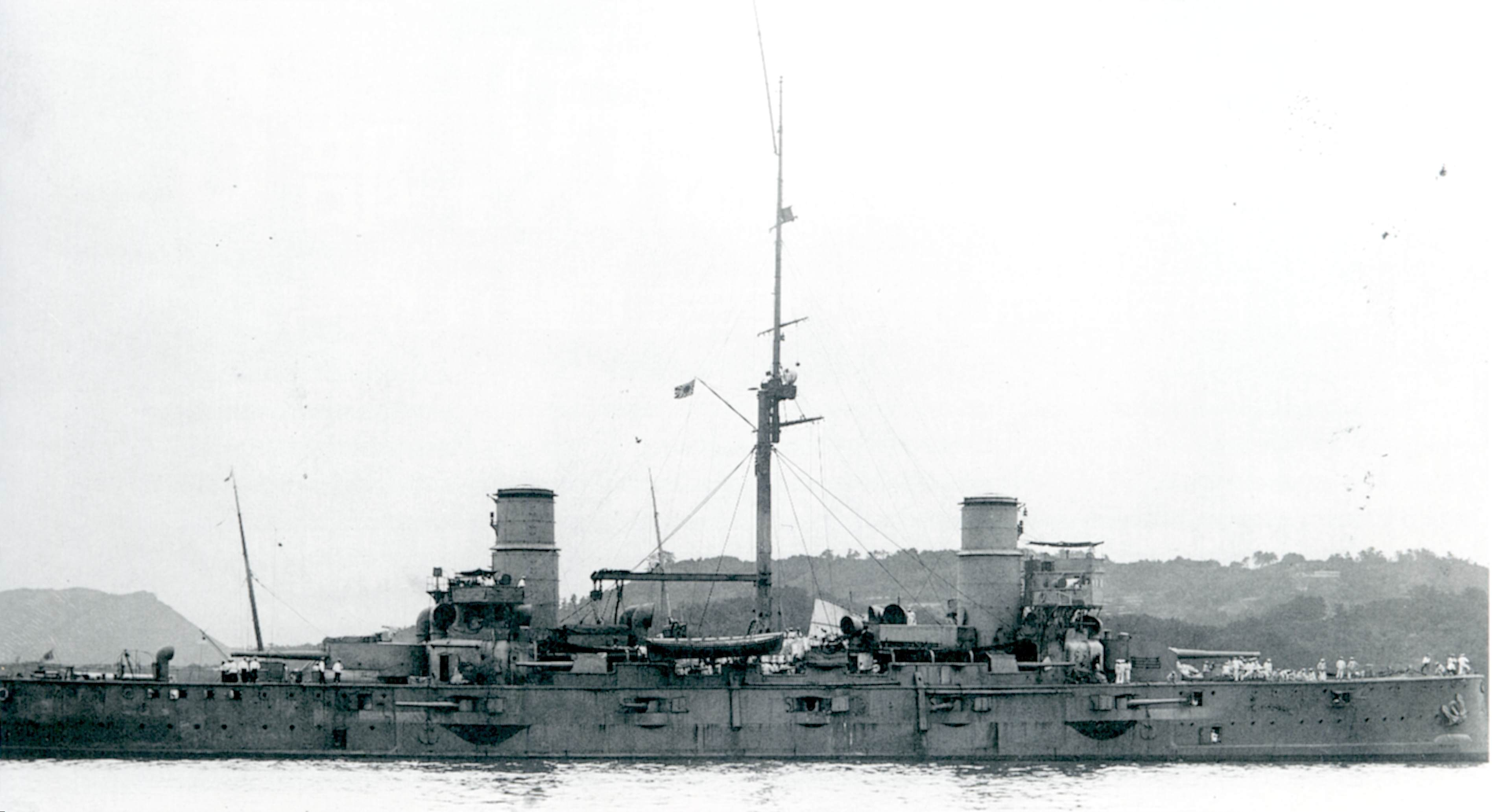
Armored cruiser Kasuga at Sasebo Naval Base on the northwest coast of Kyushu

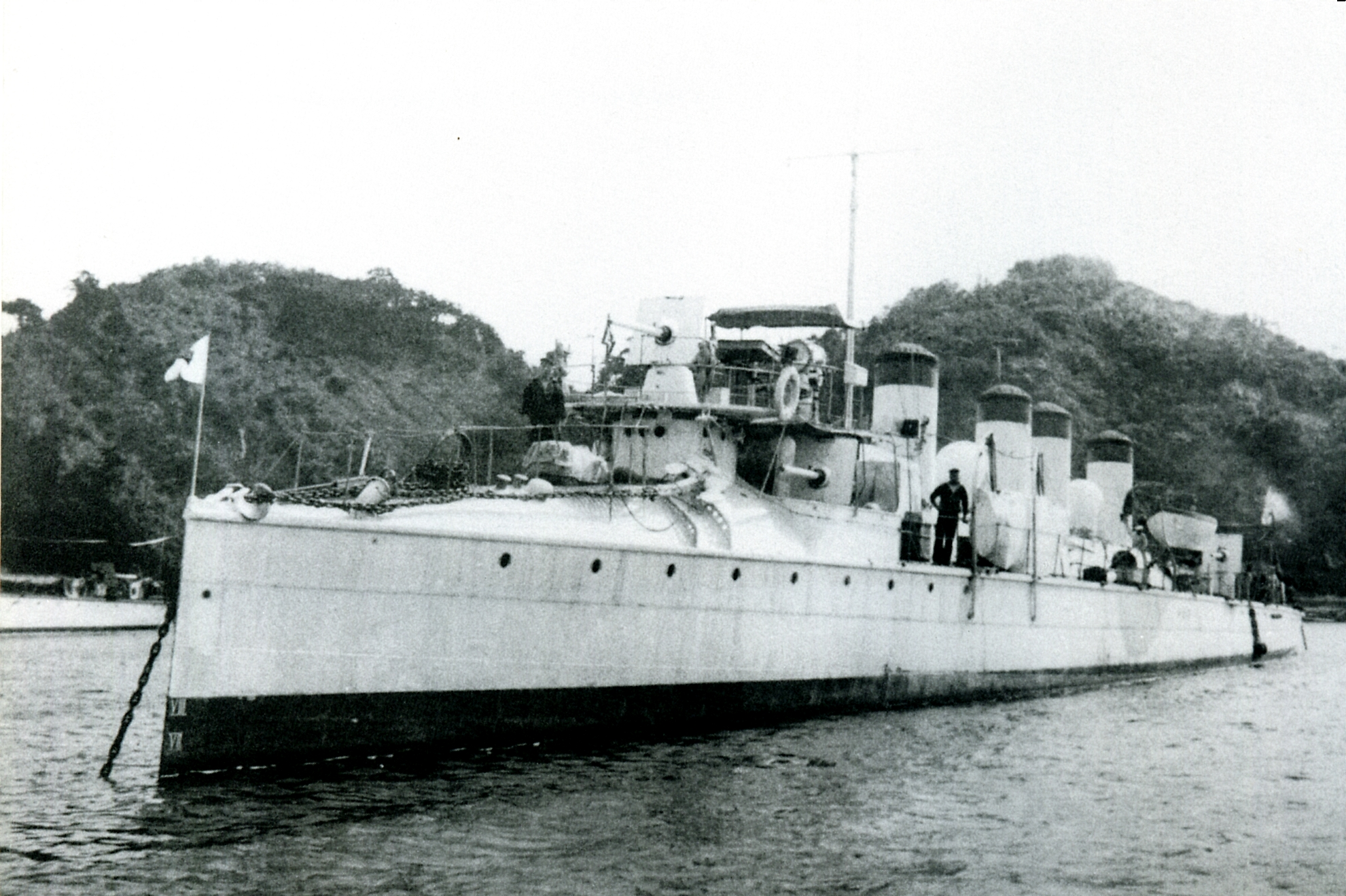
Ikazuchi-class destroyer Sazanami at Yokosuka Naval Base at the mouth of Tokyo Bay

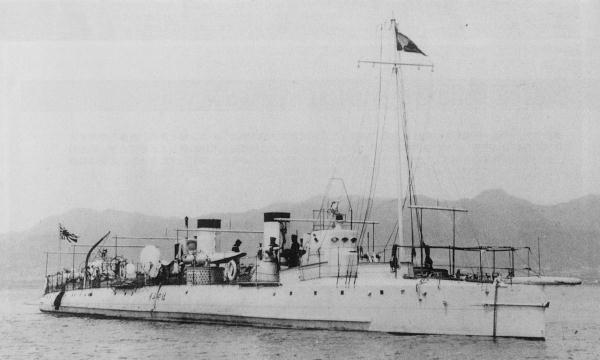
Hayabusa-class torpedo boat at Kobe on the Inland Sea

Admiral Tōgō Heihachirō in Mikasa

First Division Vice Admiral Misu Sōtarō in Nisshin

4 pre-Dreadnought battleships (all 4 × 12-inch (305 mm), 18 knots)

1 Formidable-class variant

Mikasa (Capt. Ijichi Hikojirō)

2 Shikishima-class

Shikishima (Capt. Teragaki Izō)
Asahi (Note: Sunk by submarine USS Sealion during World War II) (variant) (Capt. Nomoto Tsunaaki)

1 Fuji-class

Fuji (Capt. Matsumoto Kazu)

2 armored cruisers: both Giuseppe Garibaldi-class variants

Kasuga (Capt. Katō Sadakichi)

(forward 1 × 10-inch (254 mm), aft 2 × 8-inch (203 mm), 20 knots)

Nisshin (Note: Ensign Takano Isoroku, later adopted by the Yamamoto family, had two fingers blown from his left hand by a shell fragment while serving on this ship; had he lost three fingers, he would have been compulsorily discharged from the service. He would eventually rise to command of the Combined Fleet.) (Capt. Takenouchi Heitarō)

(4 × 8-inch (203 mm), 20 knots)

1 dispatch vessel (2 × quick-firing 4.7-inch (120 mm), 21 knots)

Tatsuta (Cmdr. Yamagata Bunzō)

Third Division
Vice Admiral Dewa Shigetō in Kasagi

4 protected cruisers

2 Kasagi-class (2 × 8-inch (203 mm), 22.5 knots)

Kasagi (Capt. Yamaya Tanin)
Chitose (Capt. Takagi Sukekazu)

2 Niitaka-class (6 × quick-firing 6-inch (152 mm), 20 knots)

Niitaka (Capt. Shōji Yoshimoto)
Otowa (Capt. Arima Ryōkitsu)

First Destroyer Division Captain Fujimoto Shūshirō

4 Harusame-class destroyers (1 × quick-firing 12-pounder, 29 knots)

Harusame (1902) (Capt. Fujimoto)
Fubuki (1905) (Lt. Tōjima Otsukichirō)
Ariake (1904) (Lt. Cmdr. Kutsumi Tsuneo)
Arare (1904) (Lt. Watanabe Shingo)

1 ex-Russian destroyer Reshitel'nyi (1 × 3-inch (75 mm), 25.75 knots)

Akatsuki (1904) (Note: The original launch date was 26 July 1901) (Lt. Harada Shōsaku)

Second Destroyer Division Captain Yajima Junkichi in Oboro

4 Ikazuchi-class destroyers (1 × quick-firing 12-pounder, 30 knots)

Oboro (1899) (Lt. Fujiwara Eisaburō)
Inazuma (1899) (Lt. Cmdr. Suga Tetsuichirō)
Ikazuchi (1898) (Lt. Cmdr. Saitō Hanroku)
Akebono (1899) (Lt. Yamanouchi Shirō)

Third Destroyer Division Captain Yoshijima Jyūtarō in Shinonome

4 destroyers

2 Shinonome-class (1 × quick-firing 12-pounder, 30 knots)

Shinonome (Lt. Cmdr. Yoshida Mōshi)
Usugumo (Lt. Cmdr. Masuda Chūkichirō)

1 Akatsuki-class (1 × quick-firing 12-pounder, 30 knots)

Kasumi (Lt. Cmdr. Shiraishi Naosuke)

1 Ikazuchi-class (1 × quick-firing 12-pounder, 30 knots)

Sazanami (Lt. Cmdr. Aiba Tsunezō)

14th Torpedo-Boat Division Lieut. Commander Seki Shigetaka

4 Hayabusa-class torpedo boats (3 × 18-inch (450 mm) torpedo tubes, 29 knots)

Chidori (1901) (Lt. Cmdr. Seki)
Hayabusa (1899) (Lt. Ebihara Keiichi)
Manazuru (1900) (Lt. Tamaoka Yoshirō)
Hashitaka (1903) (Lt. Miyamoto Matsutarō)

=== Second Squadron ===
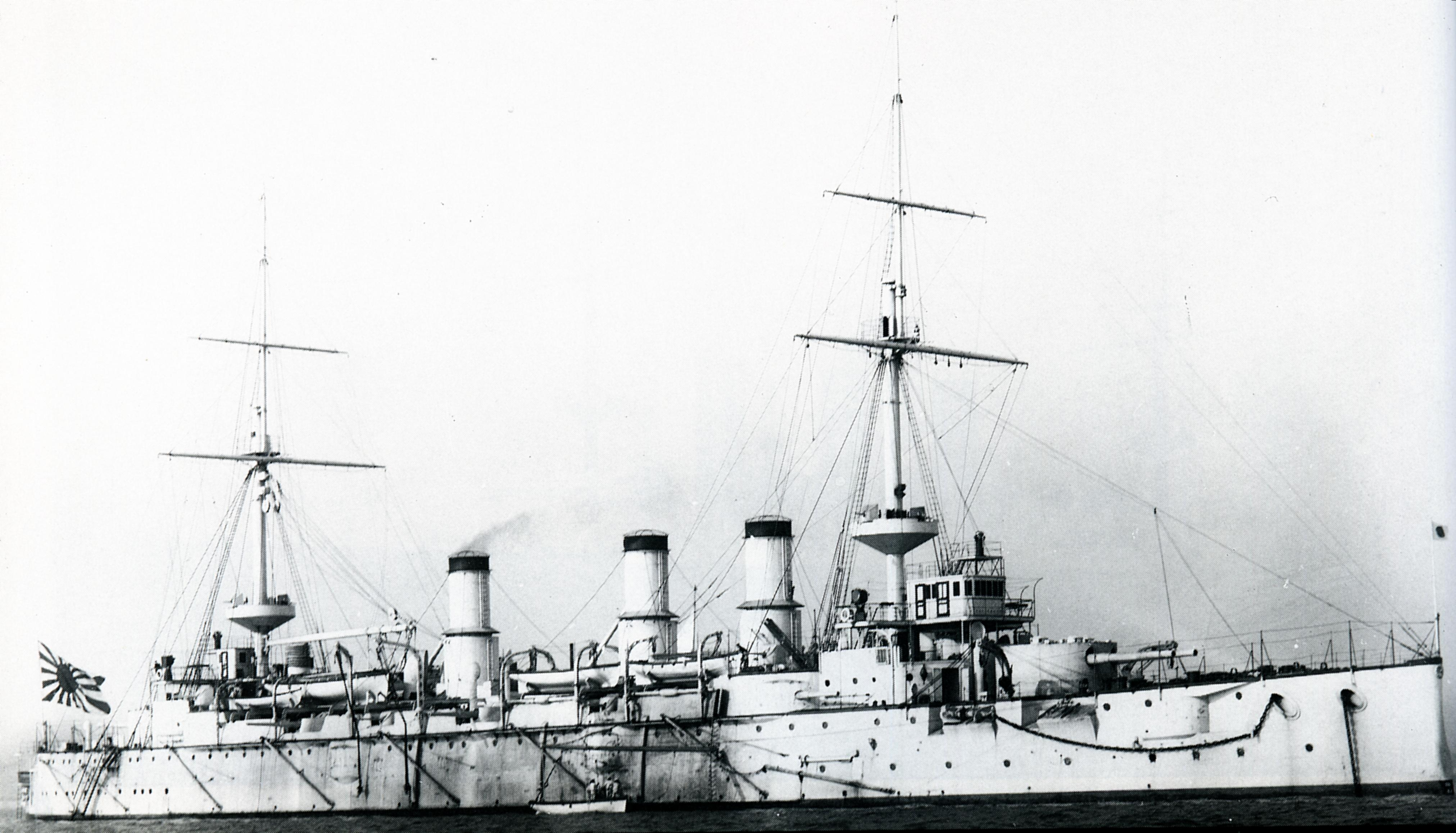
Armored cruiser Azuma at Portsmouth Naval Base, England, 1900

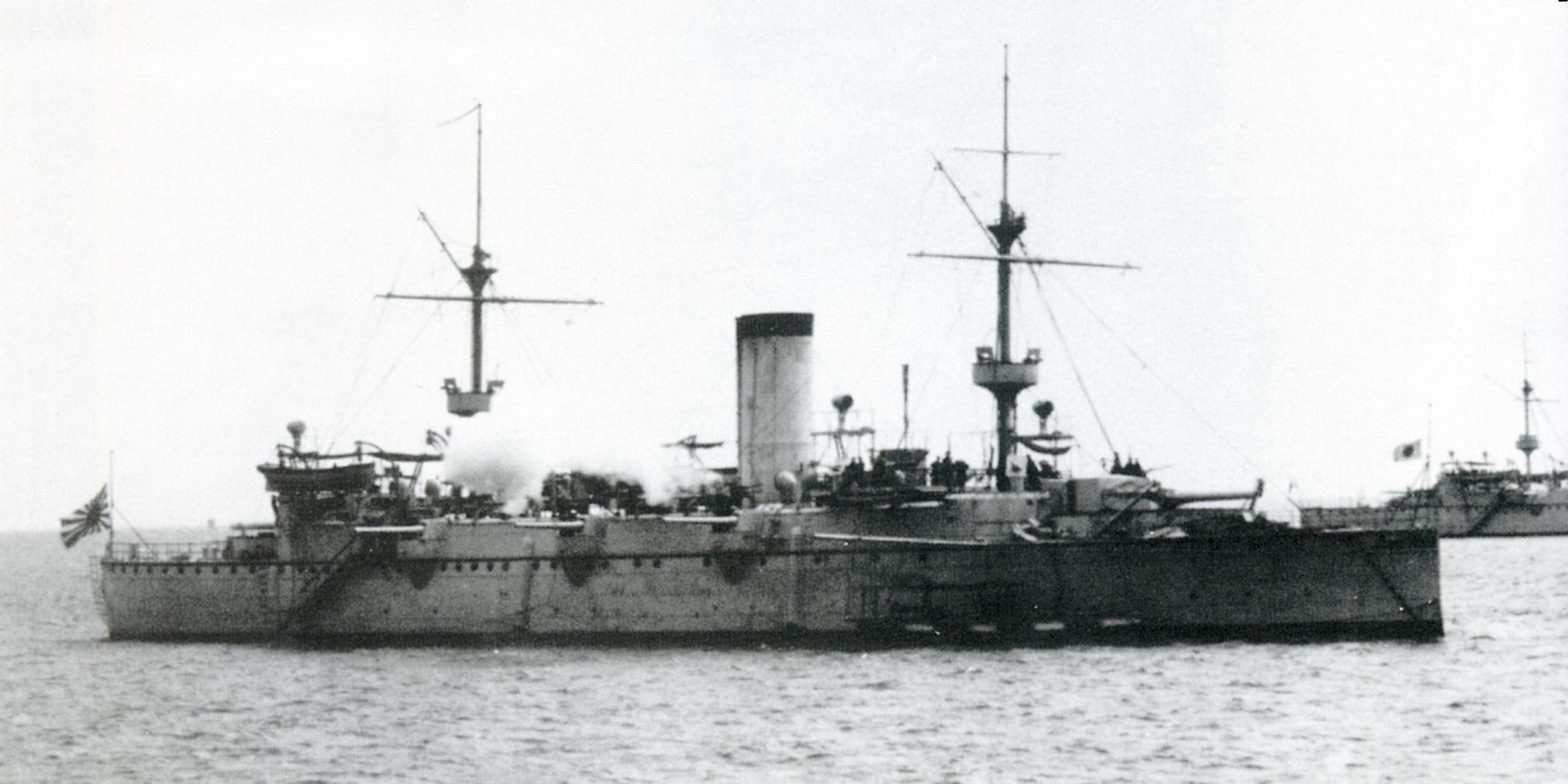
Protected cruiser Naniwa in 1887

Vice Admiral Kamimura Hikonojō in armored cruiser Izumo

Second Division
Rear Admiral Shimamura Hayao in armored cruiser Iwate

6 armored cruisers

2 Izumo-class (4 × 8-inch (203 mm), 20.75 knots)

Izumo (Note: Sunk by air attack during World War II) (Capt. Ijichi Suetaka)
Iwate (Note: Sunk by air attack during World War II) (Capt. Kawashima Reijirō)

2 Asama-class (4 × 8-inch (203 mm), 21 knots)

Asama (Capt. Yashiro Rokurō)
Tokiwa (Capt. Shigetarō Yoshimatsu

1 armored cruiser (4 × 8-inch (203 mm), 21 knots)

Azuma (Capt. Murakami Kakuichi)

1 armored cruiser (4 × 8-inch (203 mm), 20 knots)

Yakumo (Capt. Matsumoto Arinobu)

1 dispatch vessel (2 × quick-firing 4.7-inch (120 mm), 21 knots)

Chihaya (Cmdr. Eguchi Rinroku)

Fourth Division Vice Admiral Uryū Sotokichi in Naniwa

4 protected cruisers

2 Naniwa-class (2 × 10.2-inch (260 mm), 18 knots)

Naniwa (Capt. Wada Kensuke)
Takachiho (Capt. Mōri Ichihei)

1 Suma-class (2 × quick-firing 6-inch (152 mm), 20 knots)

Akashi (Capt. Ushiki Kōshirō)

1 Niitaka-class (6 × quick-firing 6-inch (152 mm), 20 knots)

Tsushima (Capt. Sentō Takenaka)

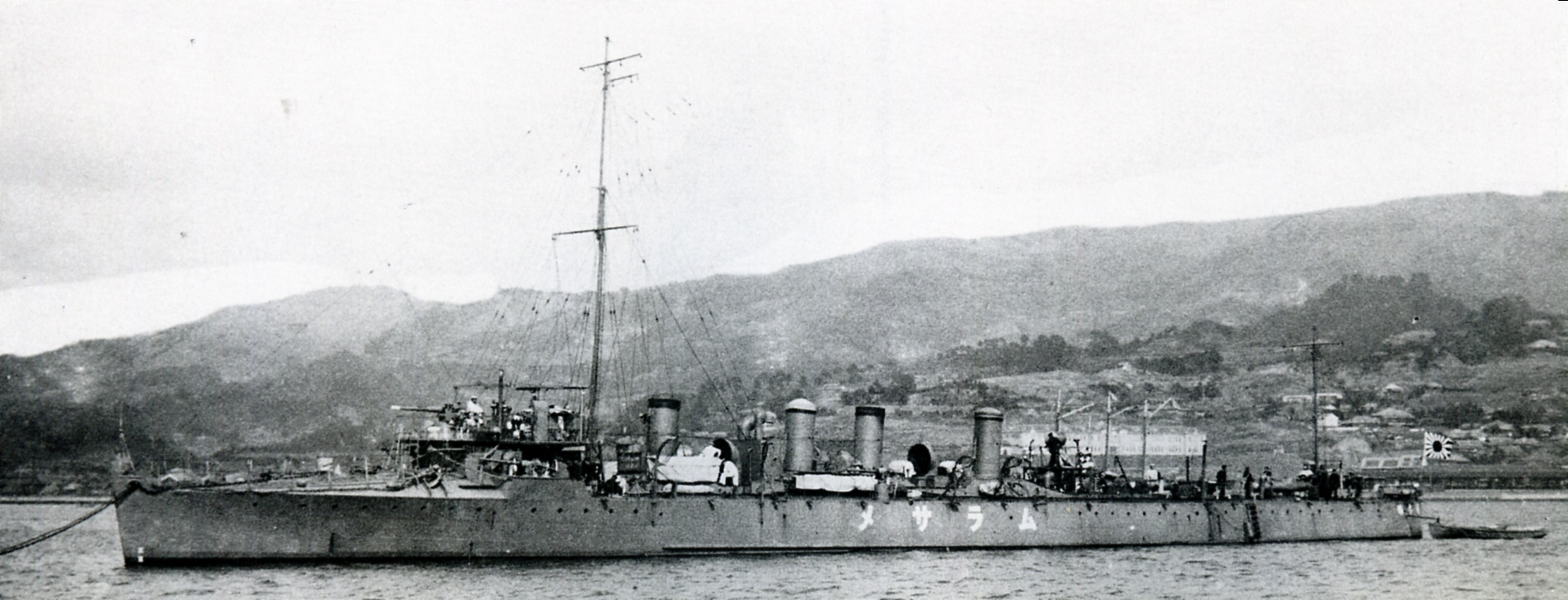
Harusame-class destroyer Murasame at Sasebo Naval Base in 1919

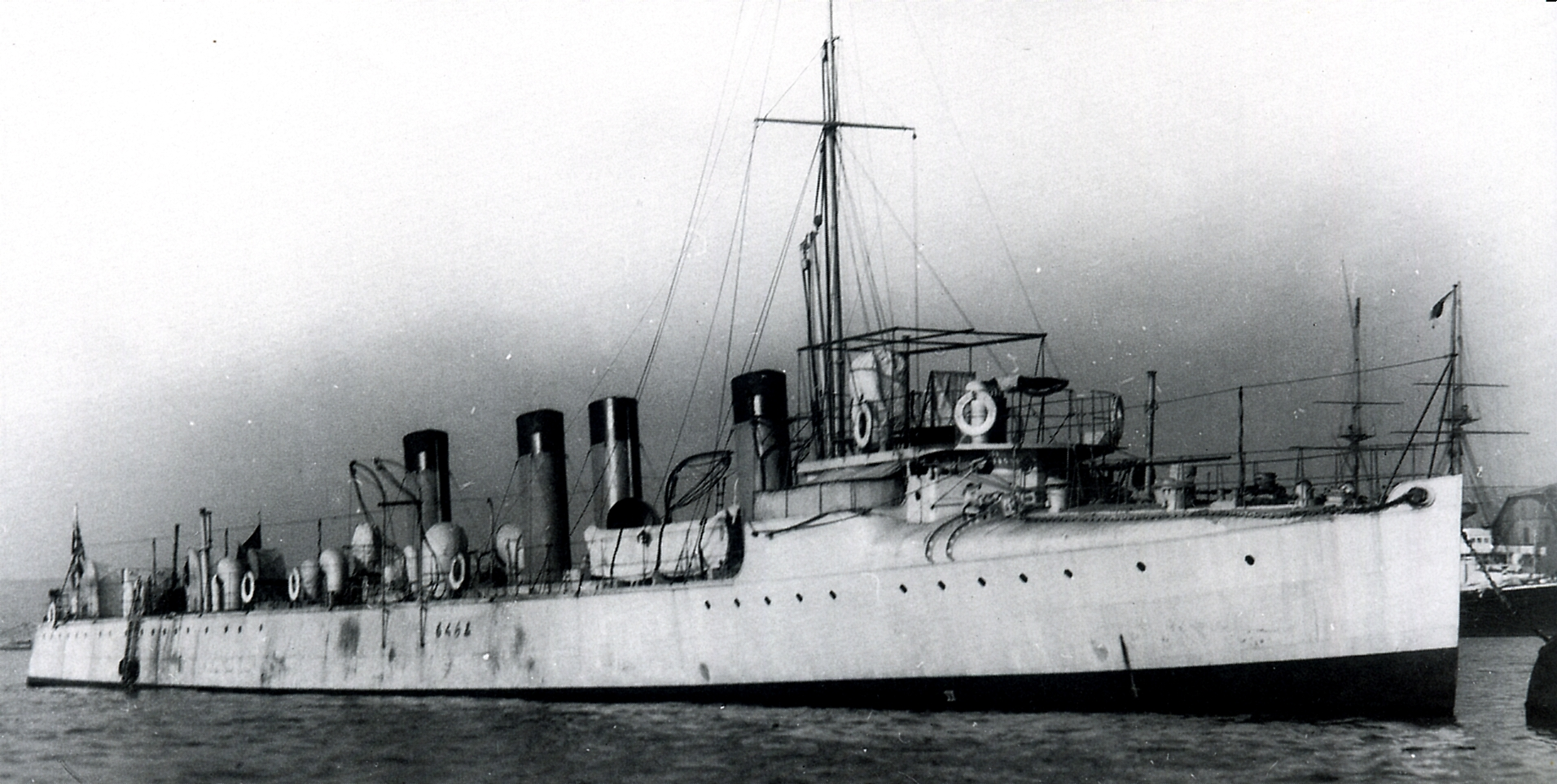
Destroyer Shirakumo during commissioning in England, 1902

Fourth Destroyer Division (Commander Suzuki Kantarō in Asagiri)

2 Harusame-class destroyers (1 × quick-firing 12-pounder, 29 knots)

Asagiri (1903) (Lt. Iida Nobutarō)
Murasame (1902) (Lt. Cmdr. Kobayashi Kenzō)

2 Shirakumo-class destroyers (1 × quick-firing 12-pounder, 31 knots)

Shirakumo (Lt. Cmdr. Kamata Masamichi)
Asashio (Lt. Cmdr. Nanri Dan'ichi)

Fifth Destroyer Division (Commander Hirose Juntarō in Shiranui)

4 Murakumo-class destroyers (1 × quick-firing 12-pounder, 30 knots)

Shiranui (Lt. Cmdr. Kuwashima Shōzō)
Murakumo (Lt. Cmdr. Shimanouchi Kanta)
Yūgiri (Lt. Cmdr. Tashiro Miyoharu)
Kagerō (1899) (Lt. Yoshikawa Yasuhira)

9th Torpedo-Boat Division (Commander Kawase Hayaharu)

4 Hayabusa-class torpedo boats (1 × 2.2-inch (57 mm), 29 knots)

Aotaka (1903) (Cmdr. Kawase)
Kari (1903) (Lt. Awaya Gazō)
Tsubame (1903) (Lt. Tajiri Yuiji)
Hato (1903) (Lt. Iguchi Daijirō)

19th Torpedo-Boat Division (Commander Matsuoka Shūzō)

3 Hayabusa-class torpedo boats (1 × 2.2-inch (57 mm), 29 knots)

Kamome (1904) (Cmdr. Matsuoka)
Ootori (1904) (Lt. Ōtani Kōshirō)
Kiji (1903) (Note: The original Kiji was abandoned after an accident at the south-end of Tsushima on 31 March 1904. Replacement boat was constructed with salvaged equipment under the budget item 'repair' at Kure Naval Arsenal; launched on 18 April 1905, completed on 9 May 1905.) (Lt. Kanzai Uemon)

=== Third Squadron ===
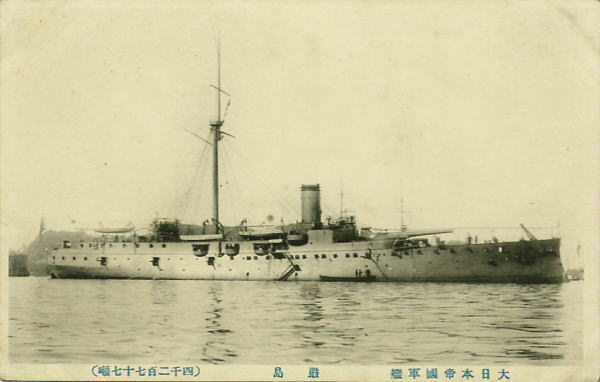
Matsushima-class protected cruiser Itsukushima

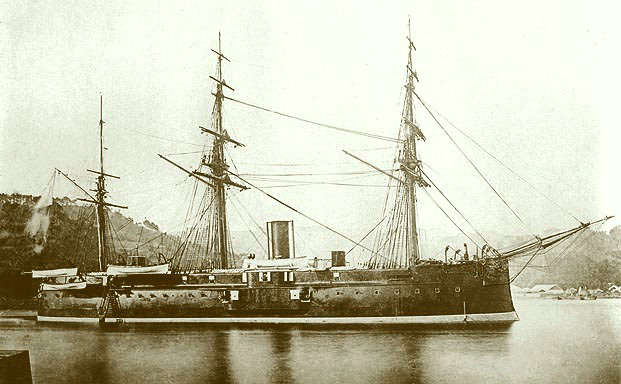
Ironclad cruiser Fusō

Vice Admiral Kataoka Shichirō in protected cruiser Itsukushima
Fifth Division
Rear Admiral Taketomi Kunikane in Hashidate

3 Matsushima-class protected cruisers (1 × 12.6-inch (320 mm) (Canet gun), 16.5 knots)

Itsukushima (Capt. Tsuchiya Tamotsu)
Hashidate (Capt. Fukui Masayoshi)
Matsushima (Capt. Okumiya Mamoru)

1 ex-Chinese turret ship (rebuilt) Zhenyuan (4 × 12-inch (305 mm), 15.4 knots)

Chin'en (Capt. Imai Kanemasa)

1 dispatch vessel (4 × quick-firing 4.7-inch (120 mm), 20.75 knots)

Yaeyama (Cmdr. Nishiyama Sanechika)

Sixth Division
Rear Admiral Tōgō Masamichi in Suma

1 Suma-class protected cruiser (2 × quick-firing 6-inch (152 mm), 20 knots)

Suma (Capt. Tochiuchi Sōjirō)

1 protected cruiser (10 × quick-firing 4.7-inch (120 mm), 19 knots)

Chiyoda (Capt. Higashifushimi Yorihito)

2 2nd class protected cruisers

Akitsushima (Capt. Hirose Katsuhiko)
Izumi (ex-Chilean cruiser Esmeralda) (Capt. Ishida Ichirō)

Seventh Division
Rear Admiral Yamada Hikohachi in Fusō

1 ironclad cruiser

Fusō (Capt. Nagai Gunkichi)

2 unprotected cruisers

Takao (Capt. Yashiro Yoshinori)
Tsukushi (Cmdr. Tsuchiyama Tetsuzō)

2 Maya-class gunboats

Chōkai (Cmdr. Ushida Jūzaburō)
Maya (Cmdr. Fujita Sadaichi)

1 gunboat

Uji (Lt. Cmdr. Kaneko Mitsuyoshi)

15th Torpedo-Boat Division Lieut. Commander Kondō Tsunematsu

4 Hayabusa-class torpedo boats (3 × 18-inch (450 mm) torpedo tubes, 29 knots)

Hibari (1903) (Lt. Cmdr. Kondō)
Sagi (1903) (Lt. Yokoo Nao)
Hashitaka (1903) (Lt. Mori Shunzō)
Uzura (1904) (Lt. Suzuki Ujimasa)

10th Torpedo-Boat Division Lieut. Commander Ōtaki Michisuke

No. 43 (1900) (Lt. Cmdr. Ōtaki)
No. 40 (1901) (Sub-Lt. Nakahara Yahei)
No. 41 (1901) (Lt. Mizuno Hironori)
No. 39 (1900) (Lt. Ōgane Minoru)

11th Torpedo-Boat Division Lieut. Commander Fujimoto Umejirō

No. 73 (1903) (Lt. Cmdr. Fujimoto)
No. 72 (1903) (Lt. Sasao Gennojō)
No. 74 (1903) (Lt. Ōtawara Tōru)
No. 75 (1903) (Lt. Kawai Taizō)

20th Torpedo-Boat Division Lieut. Commander Kubo Kimata

No. 65 (1902) (Lt. Cmdr. Kubo)
No. 62 (1902) (Lt. Tona Genzaburō)
No. 64 (1902) (Lt. Tominaga Torajirō)
No. 63 (1902) (Lt. Eguchi Kinma)

1st Torpedo-Boat Division Lieut. Commander Fukuda Masateru

No. 69 (1903) (Lt. Cmdr. Fukuda) Lost in battle
No. 70 (1903) (Lt. Nangō Jirō)
No. 67 (1903) (Lt. Nakamuta Takemasa)
No. 68 (1903) (Lt. Teraoka Hyōgo)

=== Special Duty Squadron ===
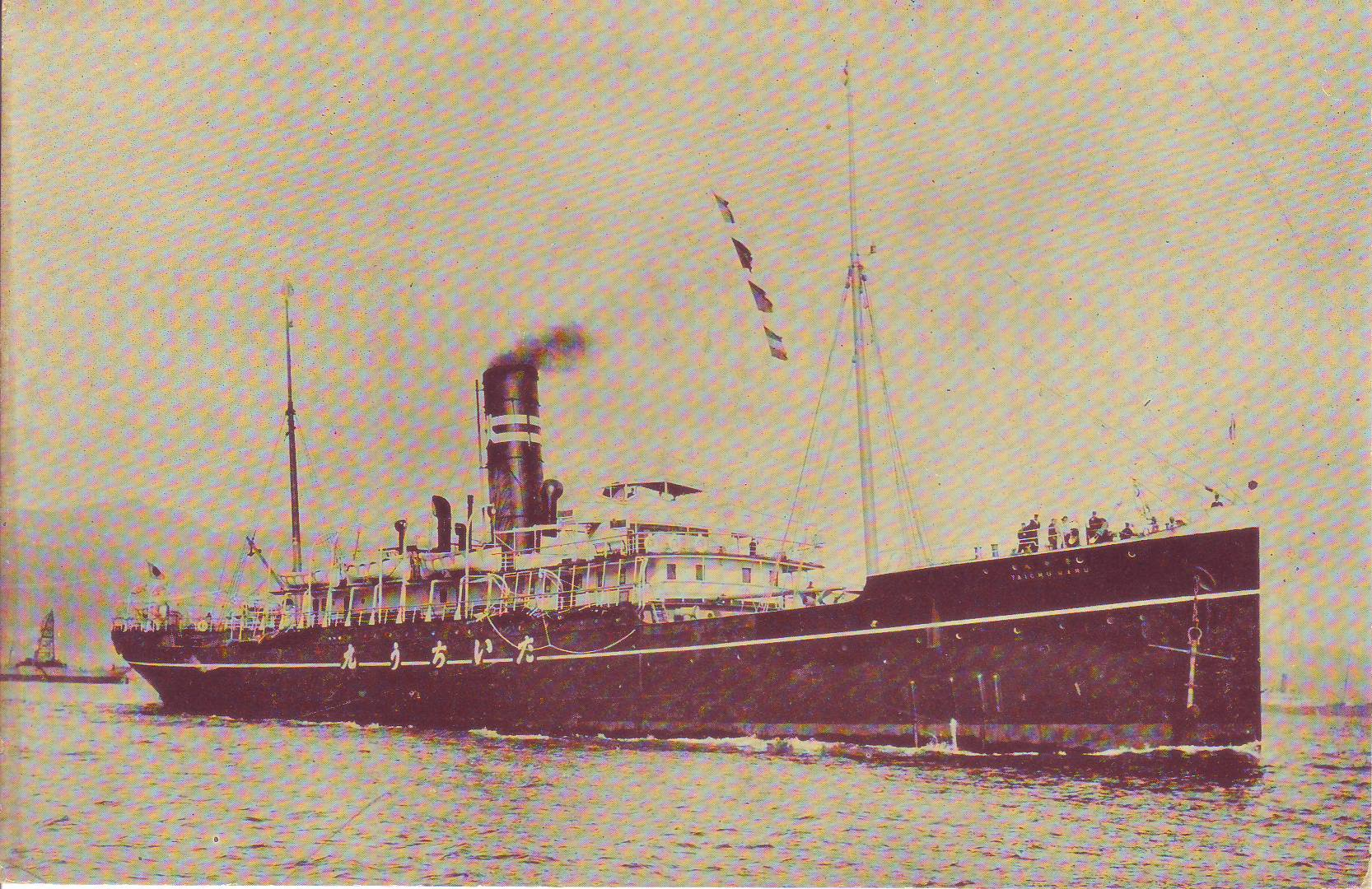
Special Duty Squadron lead ship Taichū Maru.

Rear Admiral Ogura Byōichirō in transport Taichū Maru
Eighth Division (Special Duty Division)

1 transport

Taichū Maru (Capt. Matsumura Naoomi)

17 armed merchantmen

Amerika Maru (Capt. Ishibashi Hajime)
Sado Maru (Capt. Kamaya Tadamichi)
Shinano Maru 1900 (2) (Capt. Narikawa Hakaru)
Yawata Maru (Capt. Kawai Shōgo)
Tainan Maru (Capt. Takahashi Sukeichirō)
Taijin Maru (Capt. Arakawa Noriyuki)
Heijō Maru (Capt. Chayama Toyoya)
Keijō Maru (Capt. Hanafusa Yūshirō)
Ehime Maru (Cmdr. Yonemura Sueki)
Kōryū Maru (Cmdr. Karashima Masao)
Kōsaka Maru (Cmdr. Kawamura Tatsuzō)
Mukogawa Maru (Cmdr. Tachikawa Tsuneji)
5th Uwajima Maru (Cmdr. Yonehara Sueo)
Kaijō Maru (Cmdr. Ishimaru Tōta)
Fusō Maru (Cmdr. Nakamura Kumazō)
Kantō Maru (Cmdr. Sata Naomichi)
Miike Maru (Cmdr. Kunieda Katsusaburō)

3 torpedo boat depot ships

Kumano Maru (Capt. Asai Shōjirō)
Nikkō Maru (Capt. Kimura Kōkichi)
Kasuga Maru (Capt. Obana Sangō)

1 dispatch boat

Manshū Maru (Cmdr. Nishiyama Yasukichi)

2 hospital ships

Kōbe Maru (Medical Inspector Ishikawa)
Seikyō Maru (Medical Inspector Oota)

=== Divisions outside of the Combined Fleet ===
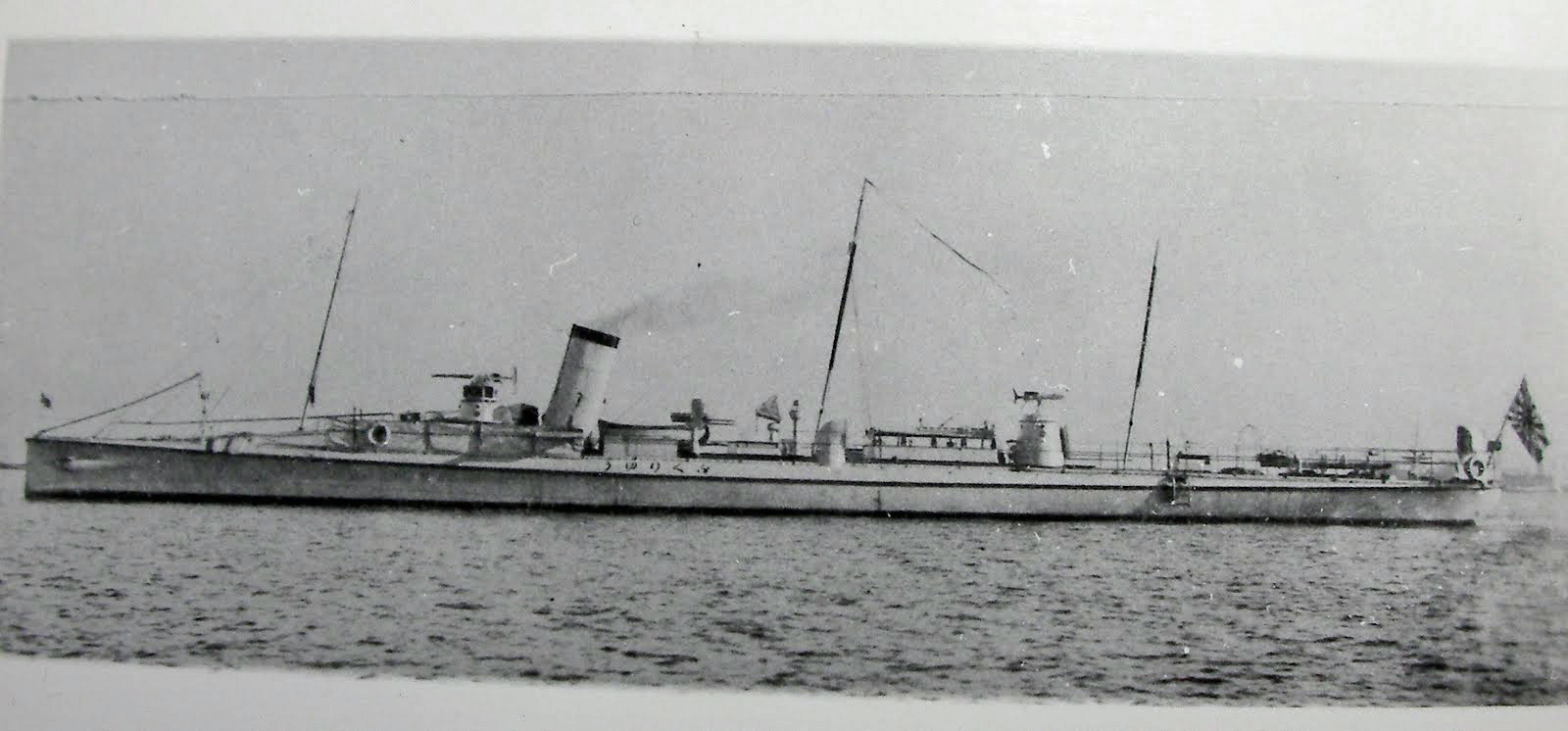
Torpedo boat Fukuryu in 1901

Kure Naval District
5th Torpedo-Boat Division (Lieut. Commander Ogawa Mizumichi)

- Fukuryū (1885) (Lt. Cmdr. Ogawa)
- No. 25 (1894) (Lt. Moritsugu Kumashirō)
- No. 26 (1894) (Lt. Tanaka Yoshitarō)
- No. 27 (1894) (Lt. Nakayama Tomojirō)

Takeshiki Guard District
16th Torpedo-Boat Division (Lieut. Commander Wakabayashi Kin)

- Shirataka (1899) (Lt. Cmdr. Wakabayashi)
- No. 66 (1902) (Lt. Kakuta Kanzō)

17th Torpedo-Boat Division (Lieut. Commander Aoyama Yoshie)

- No. 34 (1900) (Lt. Cmdr. Aoyama) Lost in battle
- No. 31 (1899) (Lt. Yamaguchi Sōtarō)
- No. 32 (1900) (Lt. Hitomi Saburō)
- No. 33 (1899) (Lt. Kawakita Kazuo)

18th Torpedo-Boat Division (Lieut. Commander Kawada Katsuji)

- No. 36 (1900) (Lt. Cmdr. Kawada)
- No. 60 (1901) (Lt. Kishina Masao)
- No. 61 (1901) (Lt. Miyamura Rekizō)
- No. 35 (1900) (Lt. Soejima Murahachi) Lost in battle

== Russian Fleet (Second and Third Pacific Squadrons) ==
The Russians suffered attrition among their fleet commanders as well as among their capital ships.

Russian admirals killed in 1904

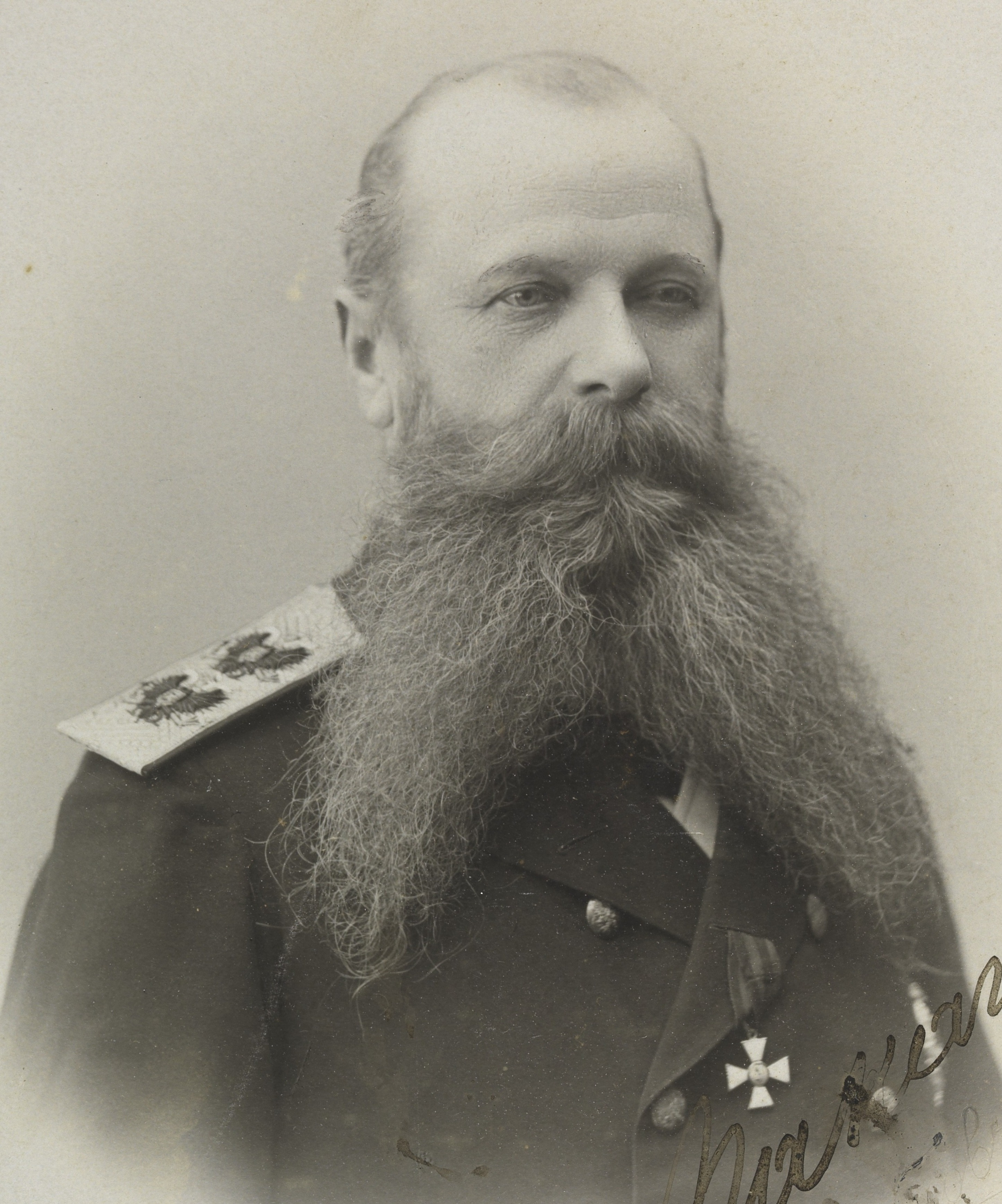
Vice-Adm. Stepan Makarov

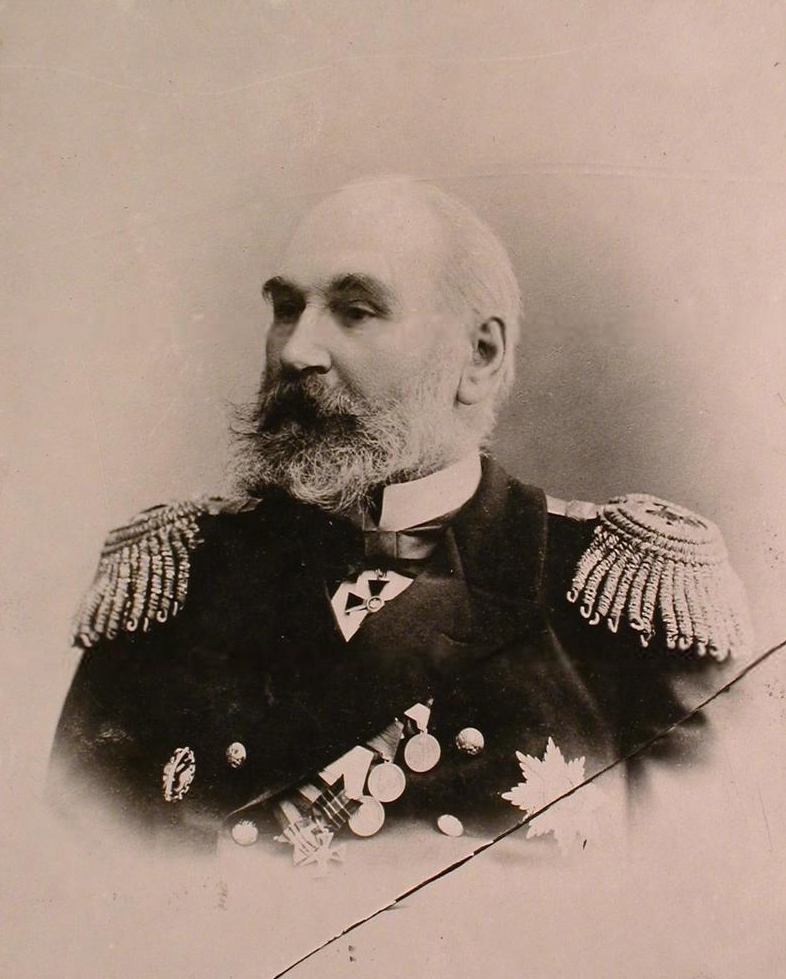
Rear-Adm. Wilgelm Vitgeft

- Vice-Admiral Stepan Makarov was killed when his flagship Petropavlovsk struck a mine and sank off Port Arthur on the morning of 13 April 1904. This was most unfortunate for the Russians as Makarov was considered their most aggressive admiral by far. (Note: "If one event in the Russo-Japanese War could be said to have decisively affected its course, it would be the sinking of the battleship Petropavlovsk".)
- His replacement, Rear-Admiral Wilgelm Vitgeft, was killed along with his immediate staff by Japanese shellfire at the Battle of the Yellow Sea on 10 August 1904.
- Having completed the arduous voyage from the Baltic Sea, Vice-Admiral Rozhestvensky was severely wounded during the first day's combat at Tsushima and captured. Treated as an honored guest by the Japanese, he recovered from his injuries and was repatriated after the war.
- Rear-Admiral Nebogatov surrendered himself and the remnant of the devastated Russian fleet the day after Rozhestvensky's wounding but found it to be unexpectedly challenging. Having been tricked earlier by a Chinese vessel that hoisted a white flag, Admiral Togo at first refused to believe the Russians were surrendering and continued shelling. Not until Nebogatov literally had Japanese rising sun flags hoisted on his ships' masts did Togo relent.

Following repatriation, Rozhestvensky was court-martialed, pled guilty and pardoned. Nebogatov and other officers involved in the surrender of the fleet were assigned the death penalty but had their sentences commuted to prison.

=== Battle Fleet ===
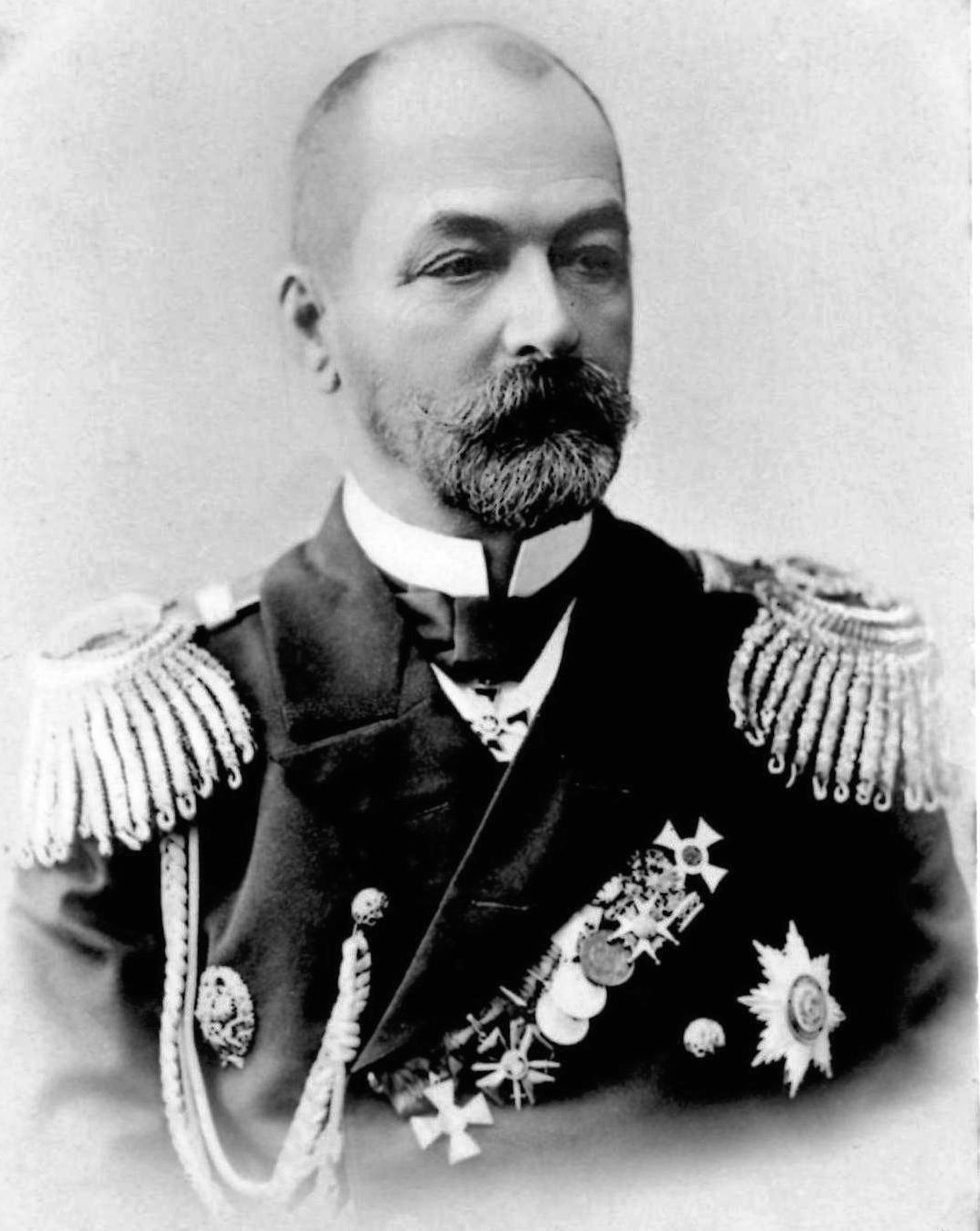
Admiral Zinovy Rozhestvensky

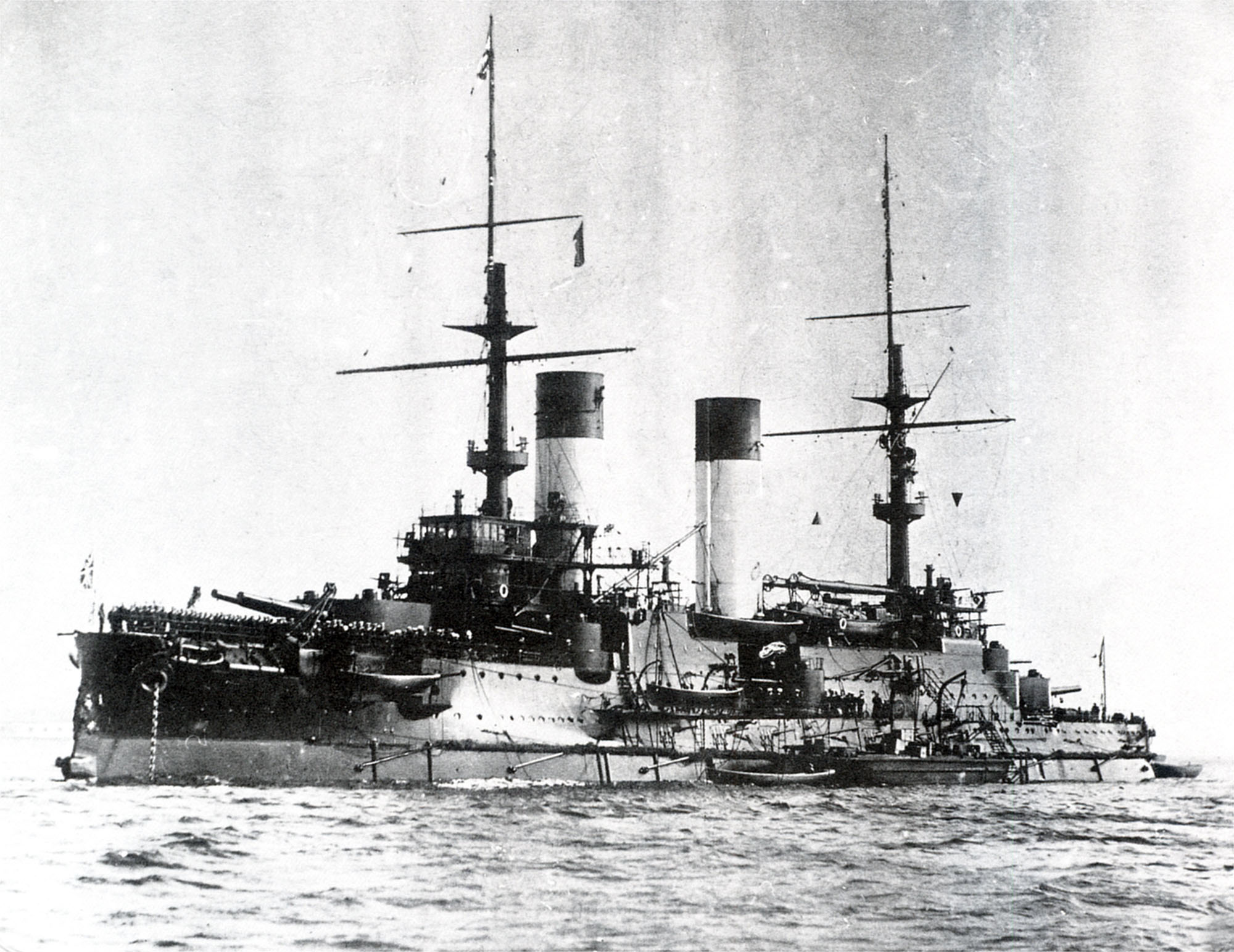
Flagship of the Imperial Russian Fleet, battleship Knyaz Suvorov

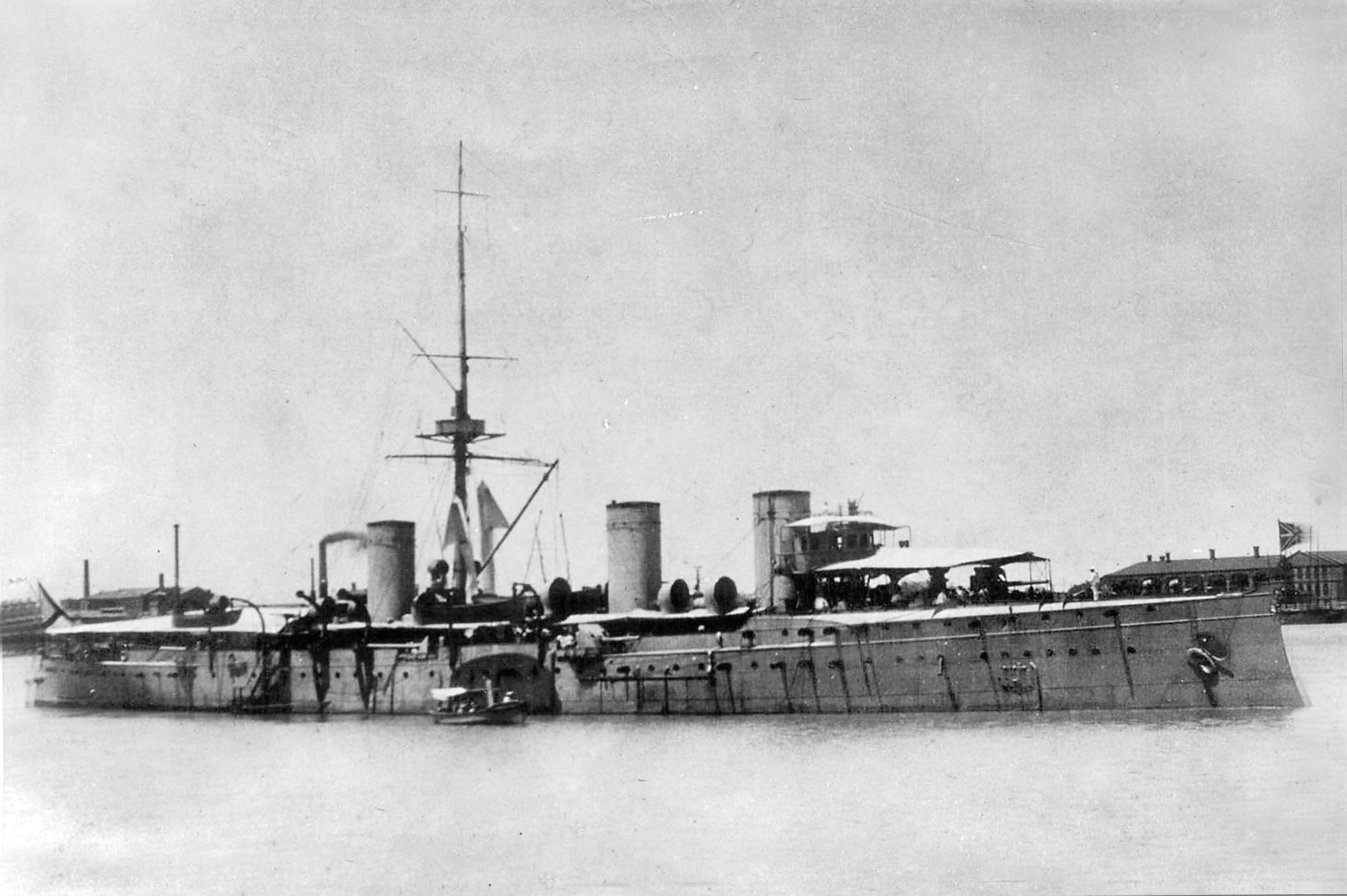
Protected cruiser Zhemchug

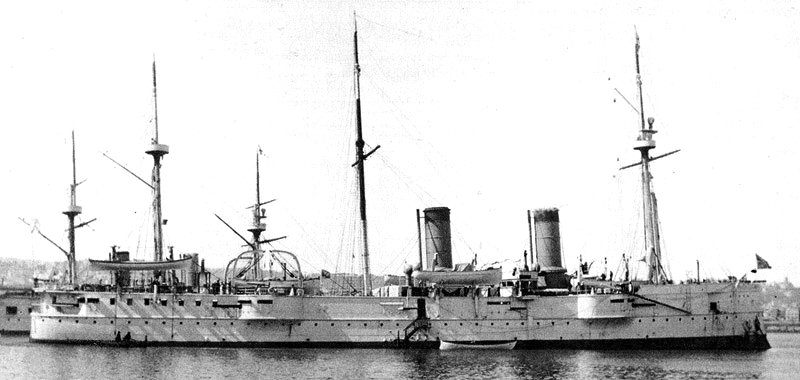
Armored cruiser Vladimir Monomakh

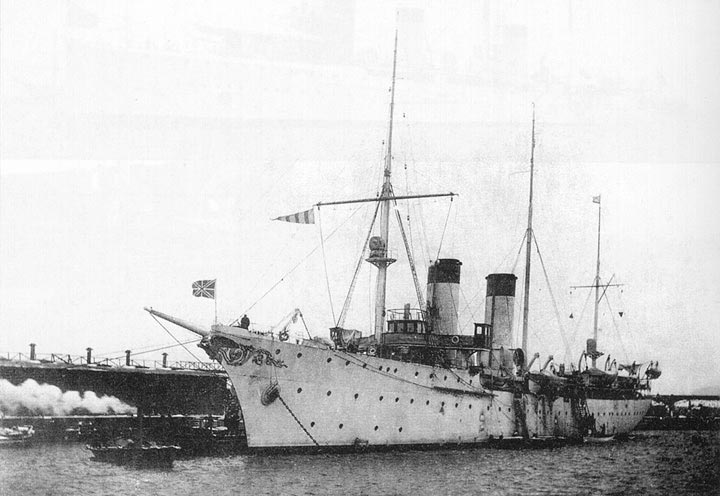
Armed yacht Almaz

First Division
Vice-Admiral Zinovy Rozhestvensky in Knyaz Suvorov

4 Borodino-class battleships (4 × 12-inch (305 mm), 18 knots)

Knyaz Suvorov (sunk 27 May) (Capt. 1st rank Vasily Ignatius)
Imperator Aleksandr III (sunk 27 May) (Capt. 1st rank Nikolai Bukhvostov)
Borodino (sunk 27 May) (Capt. 1st rank Pyotr Serebrennikov)
Oryol (captured 28 May) (Capt. 1st rank Nikolay Yung)

1 Izumrud-class protected cruiser (6 × 4.7-inch (120 mm) guns, 24 knots)

Zhemchug (Capt. 2nd rank Pavel Levitsky)

Second Division
Captain 1st rank Vladimir Baer (Note: The Second Division's original Cmdr., Rear-Admiral Baron Dmitry von Fölkersam, had died of natural causes during the voyage.) in Oslyabya

3 pre-Dreadnought battleships

Oslyabya (Peresvet-class) (sunk 27 May) (Capt. 1st rank Vladimir Baer)
Sissoi Veliky (battleship) (sunk 28 May) (Capt. 1st rank Manuil Ozerov)
Navarin (variant of Trafalgar-class) (sunk 28 May) (Capt. 1st rank Baron Bruno von Vietinghoff)

1 Imperieuse-class armored cruiser (variant)

Admiral Nakhimov (sunk 28 May) (Capt. 1st rank Aleksandr Rodionov)

1 Izumrud-class protected cruiser

Izumrud (wrecked 29 May) (Capt. 2nd rank Hans William von Fersen)

Third Division
Rear-Admiral Nikolai Nebogatov in Imperator Nikolai I

1 Imperator Aleksandr II-class battleship

Imperator Nikolai I (captured 28 May) (Capt. 1st rank Vladimir Smirnov)

3 Admiral Ushakov-class coastal defense ships

General Admiral Graf Apraksin (captured 28 May) (Capt. 1st rank Nikolai Lishin)
Admiral Seniavin (captured 28 May) (Capt. 1st rank Sergei Grogoryev)
Admiral Ushakov (sunk 28 May) (Capt. 1st rank Vladimir Miklukha)

First Cruiser Division
Rear-Admiral Oskar Enkvist) in Oleg

2 protected cruisers

Oleg (Bogatyr-class) (Capt. 1st rank Leonid Dobrotvorsky)
Aurora (Pallada-class) (Capt. 1st rank Evgeny Egoriev, Capt. 2nd rank Arkady Nebolsin)

2 armored cruisers

Dmitrii Donskoi (scuttled 29 May) (Capt. 1st rank Ivan Lebedev)
Vladimir Monomakh (scuttled 28 May) (Capt. 1st rank Vladimir Popov)

Second Scouting Division

1 protected cruiser

Svetlana (sunk 28 May) (Capt. 1st rank Sergei Shein)

1 armed merchant cruiser

Ural (sunk 27 May) (Capt. 2nd rank Mikhail Istomin)

=== Destroyer Flotilla ===
- First Destroyer Division
  - Byedovy (Capt. 2nd rank Nikolai Baranov)
  - Bystryy (1902) (Lt. Otto Theodor von Richter)
  - Buiny (Capt. 2nd rank Nikolai Kolomeytsev)
  - Bravyy (Lt. Pavel Durnovo)
- Second Destroyer Division
  - Blestyashchiy (Capt. 2nd Rank Aleksandr Shamov)
  - Gromky (Capt. 2nd rank Georgy Kern)
  - Grozny (Capt. 2nd rank Konstantin Andrzhievsky)
  - Bezuprechny (Capt. 2nd rank Iosif Matusevich II)
  - Bodryy (Capt. 2nd rank Pyotr Ivanov)

=== Transport Squadron ===
Auxiliaries

- 1 armed yacht classified as 2nd class cruiser
  - Almaz (Capt. 2nd rank Ivan Chagin)
- 2 transport/merchant ships
  - Anadyr (Capt. 2nd rank Vladimir Ponomarev)
  - Irtuish (Capt. 2nd rank Konstantin Egormyshev)
- 1 repair ship
  - Kamchatka ship (2) (Capt. 2nd rank Andrey Stephanov)
- 1 ammunition ship
  - Koreya (Capt. 1st rank Bakanov)
- 2 fleet tugs
  - Rus (Capt. 1st rank V. V. Pernits)
  - Svir (Enisgn Gustav Rosenfeld)
- 2 hospital ships
  - Oryol (Capt. 2nd rank Yakov Lakhmatov)
  - Kostroma (Colonel Nikolai Smelsky)

== Bibliography ==
- Forczyk, Robert (2009). Russian Battleship vs Japanese Battleship, Yellow Sea 1904–1905. Duel No. 15. Oxford: Osprey Publishing. ISBN 978-1-84603-330-8.
- Lardas, Mark (2018). Tsushima 1905: Death of a Russian Fleet. Campaign No. 330. Oxford: Osprey Publishing. ISBN 978-1-4728-2683-1.
