= Ogura (disambiguation) =

Ogura is a Japanese surname.

Ogura may also refer to:

== Places ==
- Lake Ogura, a lake located near Kyoto in the Kyoto prefecture
- Ogura Station, a railway station in Uji, Kyoto, Japan
- Mount Ogura, a mountain in Nagano Prefecture, Japan

== Other uses ==
- Ogura (小倉), a red bean paste
- Ogura (オーグラ), an antagonist in The Legendary Starfy video game series
