= Ogura =

Ogura (written: 小倉 lit. "small storehouse") is a Japanese surname. Notable people with the surname include:

== Surname ==
- Ai Ogura (小椋 藍; born 2001), Japanese Grand Prix racer
- Akane Ogura (小椋アカネ), Japanese manga artist
- Byōichirō Ogura (小倉鋲一郎; 1853–1928), Japanese admiral
- Eisuke Ogura (小倉英介), Japanese game designer
- Emmanuel Ogura (born 2002), Ghanaian goalkeeper
- Hirokazu Ogura (小倉博和; born 1960), Japanese musician
- Hisashi Ogura (小倉 久史; born 1968), Japanese shogi player
- Hisayoshi Ogura (小倉 久佳; born 1959), member of Taito Corporation's "house band" Zuntata
- Jumpei Ogura ((小倉純平; born 1992), Japanese rugby union player
- Kei Ogura (小椋 佳; born 1944), Japanese singer, songwriter and composer
- Kinnosuke Ogura (小倉金之助; 1885–1962), Japanese mathematician
- Masatsune Ogura (小倉 正恆; 1875–1961), Japanese politician and businessman
- Nana Ogura (小倉奈々, born 1990), former Japanese AV actress
- Ogura Yonesuke Itoh, Japanese-American artist
- Roh Ogura (小倉 朗; 1916–1990), Japanese composer and writer
- Shinji Ogura (小倉 新司; born 1944), Japanese long jumper
- Shinpei Ogura (小倉 進平; 1882–1944), Japanese linguist
- Shinsuke Ogura (小椋 真介; born 1980), Japanese baseball player
- Shōhei Ogura (小椋 祥平; born 1985), Japanese footballer
- Takafumi Ogura (小倉 隆史; born 1973), Japanese footballer
- Terumi Ogura (小倉 輝美; born 1963), Japanese cyclist
- Tsutomu Ogura (小倉 勉; born 1966), Japanese footballer
- Yasunori Ogura (小倉康則; born 1958), Japanese Shokotan karate master
- Yuki Ogura (小倉 遊亀; 1895–2000), nihonga painter in Showa period Japan
- Yui Ogura (小倉 唯; born 1995), Japanese voice actress and singer
- Yuko Ogura (小倉 優子; born 1983), Japanese model and singer
