= Bruno von Vietinghoff =

Russian naval captain (1849–1905)

Bruno von Vietinghoff Бруно фон Фитингоф
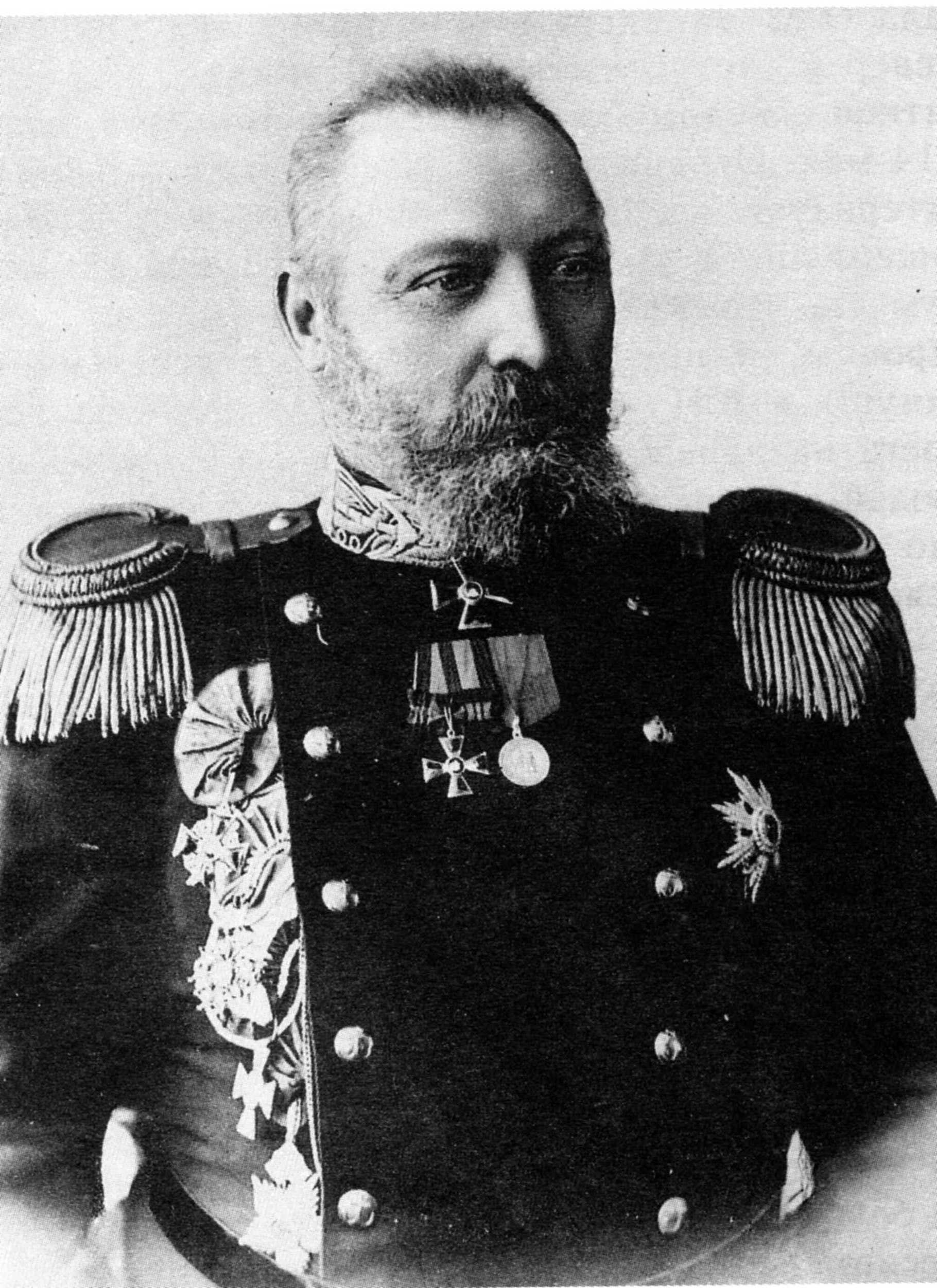
- Born: December 2, 1849; Livonia, Russia
- Died: May 27, 1905 (aged 55); Straits of Tsushima
- Military career
- Allegiance: Russia
- Branch: Imperial Russian Navy
- Service years: 1866 – 1905
- Rank: Captain 1st rank
- Unit: Second Pacific Squadron
- Commands: Navarin
- Conflicts: Russo-Japanese War; Battle of Tsushima †

Bruno Alexandrovich von Vietinghoff (December 2, 1849 – May 27, 1905) was a Russian Captain 1st Rank of Baltic German origin. He was known for commanding the Navarin during the Battle of Tsushima of the Russo-Japanese War before being killed in the battle after the ship sunk.

== Biography ==
Bruno was born on December 2, 1849, as a member of the House of Vietinghoff which was a Baltic German noble family. He enrolled in the Naval Cadet Corps on September 15, 1866. While training, he was aboard the Gromoboi from June 3 to August 20, 1867, the Bayan from May 2 to August 18, 1868, the Marevo from May 25 to August 17, 1869, the Peresvet from June 11 to September 2, 1870, and the Memory of Mercury from October 13, 1870, to March 1, 1871. He graduated as Garde de la Marine on April 11, 1870 and was appointed to the 2nd Naval Crew on May 14. Vietinghoff sailed on the Pervenets from August 18 to September 25, 1871, and the Petropavlovsk from June 3 to September 25, 1871. He was promoted to Michman on April 11, 1872, and was a student at the Shooting Club from November 6, 1872, to September 3, 1873, before being transferred to the Baltic Cruiser Customs Flotilla on October 3, 1873.

From November 18, 1873, to 1874, he commanded the customs schooner Zorkaya, the Chasovoy from 1875 to 1877, promoted to Lieutenant on January 1, 1876, and assigned to the 6th Naval Crew on May 3, 1876, and was assigned to the 9th company of the Smerch before being at the disposal of the commander of the Customs Cruiser Flotilla on March 26, 1878. Vietinghoff commanded the Strazh from April 8, 1878, to April 23, 1884, and from April 7 to September 9, 1885, on the Zhemchug and was transferred to the 7th Naval Crew. On September 39, 1885, Vietinghoff was appointed to Komendor classes, promoted to Captain 2nd rank on January 1, 1887, and made Assistant chief for combat and economic parts 6 days later. He was made the senior officer of the Manjur from February 28 to July 22, 1887, commander of the Samoyed on November 4, 1891, and given command of the Smerch again on January 1, 1893.

After being made a member of the Naval Court on June 25, 1893, he was transferred to the Chairman of the Selection Committee at the steamship plant. He traveled to Baku on January 30, 1895, to be appointed commander of the Geok-Tepe as well as being transferred to the 3rd Naval Crew on November 11, 1897, but was transferred to the Revel naval half-crew 6 days later. Vietinghoff was made acting-commander of the port of Reval on January 25, 1898, before being made official commander on March 21. On March 13, 1900, he commanded the Kreml but transferred to the Artillery Training Detachment on October 18. During the Russo-Japanese War, he commanded the Navarin and during the Battle of Tsushima, he was severely wounded on the stomach and legs from a Japanese shrapnel while at the top and decided to go down with the ship. Mikhail Osipovich Menshikov wrote a letter to the Russian government to memorialize the battle, writing:

Let Russia not forget the battleship Navarin, which, noticing the desperate situation of the Suvorov, which was burning like a fire, covered it with itself from the raining Japanese bombs. Broken, blown up by mines and bombs, with a killed crew, with a mortally wounded commander, the battleship still held on. Wounded in the head and chest, Baron Vietinghof refused to leave the ship and decided to sink with it. “Faithful to the decision to die, but not to surrender,” writes one participant in the battle, “the officers, just before the death of the ship, said goodbye to the lined up team and, preparing for death, fraternally kissed each other, and the crippled commander ordered himself to be taken upstairs.” The senior officer Durkin, who replaced him, also refused the life belt, saving the team until the last moment. The Japanese continued to shoot Russian people floundering in the water. A few hours later, the Japanese destroyer still saw the Russians swimming and dying of exhaustion and did not give them help. Only the English steamer managed to save three sailors, who told about the horrors of that night. Do not forget, mother Russia, the names of Fitingof and Durkin, Rklitsky, Grau, Izmailov, Chelkunov, Ogarev and many, many who were tortured and killed for your great name!

== Awards ==
- Order of Saint Stanislaus, III Class (April 13, 1875)
- Order of Saint Anna, III Class (April 20, 1880)
- Order of Saint Vladimir, IV Class (August 22, 1886)
- Order of Saint Vladimir II Class (January 1, 1890)
- Order of Saint Anna, II Class (June 6, 1896)

=== Foreign Awards ===
- Persia: Order of the Lion and the Sun, II Class (June 13, 1896)
