= Vladimir Popov (admiral) =

Russian admiral (1857–)

Vladimir Popov Владимир Попов
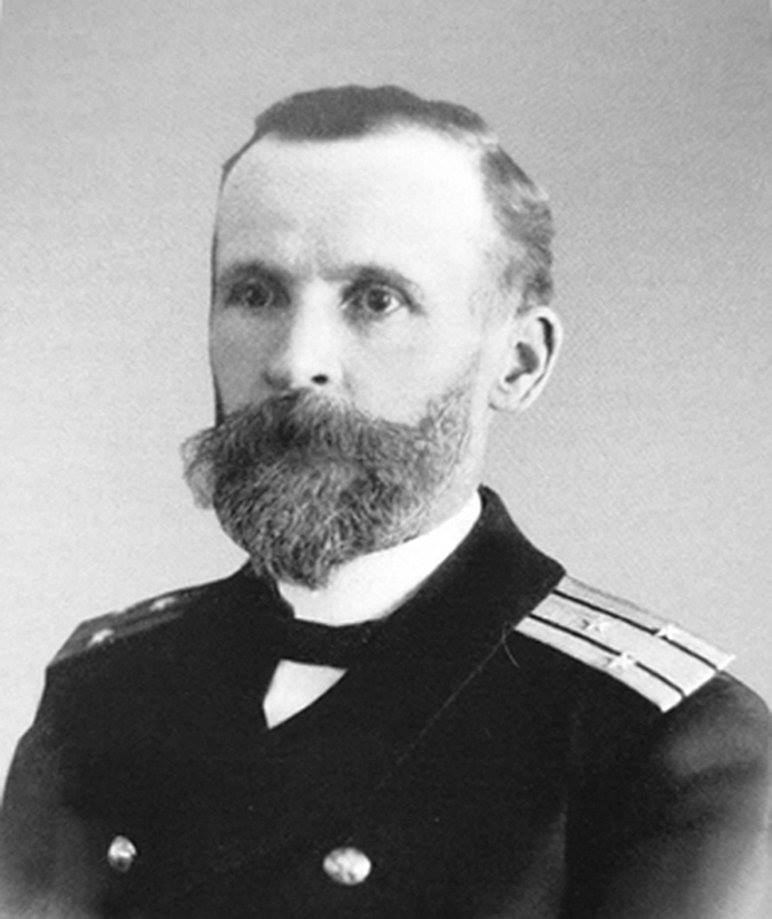
- Popov as a Captain 2nd Rank
- Born: April 8, 1857; Vologda, Russia
- Died: Date of death unknown
- Alma mater: Naval Cadet Corps
- Military career
- Allegiance: Russia
- Branch: Imperial Russian Navy
- Service years: 1873 – c. 1915
- Rank: Kontr-admiral
- Commands: Vladimir Monomakh
- Conflicts: Russo-Japanese War; Battle of Tsushima

Vladimir Alexandrovich Popov (Russian: Алексе́й Никола́евич Куропа́ткин; April 8, 1857 – date of death unknown) was a Russian Counter Admiral of the Russo-Japanese War and the Russian Civil War. He commanded the Vladimir Monomakh during the Battle of Tsushima as well as holding command of the Corps of the Maritime Department.

== Military career ==
Vladimir was born on April 8, 1857, at the Vologda Governorate as the son of Alexander Vasilyevich Popov, a collegiate councillor and Apolinaria Vasilievna (née Glubokovskaya) as one of six children. On September 13, 1873. Popov was admitted to the Naval Cadet Corps and became a non-commissioned officer on November 2, 1876, as well as be a part of the 1st Naval Crew on May 20, 1877. He was made Gardes de la Marine on August 30, 1877, and promoted to michman on August 30, 1878. Popov would receive his first command on March 27, 1879, as he commanded the 7th company of the monitor Bronenosets and was promoted to Lieutenant on January 1, 1883. On September 21, 1883, he was made inspector of the Kreyser as he sailed for the Far East and went on a business trip between August 15 to October 15, 1886, holding command of the Kreyser during so. On February 10, 1888, Popov was made commander of the 9th company of the Plastun at Kronstadt. Popov was then transferred to the 6th company of the Skobelev within the 3rd Naval Crew on May 2, 1889. From September 1, 1890, to November 5, 1893, he commanded the Rybka, assigned to the 9th Naval Crew on January 1, 1894, and became the senior officer aboard the Voevoda and Khrabryy on March 5, 1894, and October 2, 1895, respectively.

Popov was promoted to Captain 2nd Rank on December 6, 1895, and would then become the senior officer of the cruiser Vladimir Monomakh on January 13, 1897. From October 2 to November 8, he was made commander of destroyer No. 117 to withdraw him for the winter at the port of Libau. On December 6, 1899, he held command of the Leytenant Ilyin as part of the 10th Naval Crew. He then commanded the Voin from January 1, 1901, to December 6, 1903. Taking a brief detour from military-related jobs, he would become head of the Kronstadt School of Clerks and Landlords on September 4, 1902. He was promoted to Captain 1st Rank on March 28, 1904, and would regain command of the Vladimir Monomakh as well as the 9th Naval Crew on November 8, 1904, where he'd participate in the Battle of Tsushima during the Russo-Japanese War. Afterwards, Popov would continue commanding the 9th Naval Crew on December 26, 1905, before transferring to the 1st Naval Crew on November 29, 1906. After becoming Chairman of the Audit Commission of the Society of Kronstadt Pilots, he would assume the title of Pilot Commander on September 29, 1909. Finally, Popov was promoted to Counter Admiral on December 6, 1909 and became part of the Corps of the Maritime Department on February 4, 1913.

== Personal life ==
At some point, Popov would marry Maria Tikhonovna who was the widow of Captain 2nd Rank Khrabro-Vasilevsky. They'd proceed to have three children:

- Nikolay (born October 20, 1895)
- Dmitry (born March 27, 1903)
- Tatyana (born August 12, 1901)

== Awards ==
- Order of Saint Stanislaus, III Class (May 15, 1883)
- Order of Saint Anna, III Class (January 1, 1888)
- Order of Saint Stanislaus, II Class (June 12, 1894)
- Order of Saint Anna, II Class (June 12, 1897)
- Order of Saint Vladimir, IV Class with bow (December 23, 1897) "for long service"
- Order of Saint Vladimir, III Class with swords (January 8, 1907)
- War of 1904–1905, Commemorative Medal, Light Bronze
- Order of Saint Stanislaus, 1st Class (March 25, 1912)
- 200th Anniversary of the Victory at Gangut Commemorative Medal (February 28, 1915)

=== Foreign Awards ===
- France: Legion of Honor, Knight (May 27, 1902)
