= Vasily Ignatius =

Vasily Ignatius Василий Игнациус
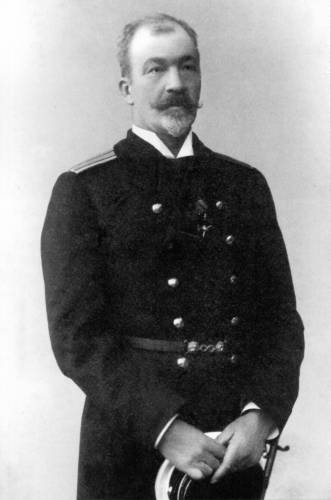
- Born: June 21, 1854; Saint Petersburg Governorate, Russia
- Died: May 27, 1905 (aged 50); Straits of Tsushima
- Spouse: Elizaveta Fedorovna Klemets
- Children: 2
- Military career
- Allegiance: Russia
- Branch: Imperial Russian Navy
- Service years: 1871–1905
- Rank: Captain 1st Rank
- Unit: Second Pacific Squadron
- Commands: Knyaz Suvorov
- Conflicts: Russo-Japanese War; Battle of Tsushima †
- Other work: Painter

Vasily Vasilievich Ignatius (Russian: Васи́лий Васи́льевич Игна́циус; 21 June 1854 – 27 May 1905) was a Russian 1st Captain and painter of the Russo-Japanese War. He commanded the Russian battleship Knyaz Suvorov throughout the war until he was killed when the ship was sunk at the Battle of Tsushima. He was also known for his paintings of different Russian ships throughout the history of the Imperial Russian Navy.

== Early military career ==
Ignatius was born on June 21, 1854, as the son of a 2nd Lieutenant of the 17th Artillery Brigade. He entered the Naval Cadet Corps on September 16, 1871, as a cadet. He entered into active service on April 13, 1872, before being made a Gardes de la Marine on April 13, 1875, and promoted to Michman on August 30, 1876. He then participated in several mine officer classes as a compulsory student on September 24, 1878, and made a mine officer of the Russian cruiser Rogue a day later. By January 1, 1881, he was promoted to Leytenant and on September 25, he was given command of the Russian frigate Svetlana and command of the Russian destroyer Minonoska on April 15, 1882, with him being the head of the weapons at the ship by August 1, 1884. He briefly commanded the Russian destroyer Kuritsa in 1885 before given command of the imperial yachts Alexandria and Derzhava from 1885 to 1886 and being made a mine officer on the Derzhava on March 8, 1886. He was then decommissioned from the Derzhava for a business trip for Vladivostok on September 17, 1886, on the Russian cruiser Vestnik.

== Painting career ==
From August 26, 1888, to August 5, 1889, Ignatius left for Paris to study painting with Professor A. P. Bogolyubov. One month later, he gained permission from Grand Duke Alexei Alexandrovich to study at the Imperial Academy of Arts to practice painting with exemption from company teachings and classes. Ignatius proceeded to create portraits of several Russian ships throughout history.

== Later career and the Russo-Japanese War ==
On April 19, 1890, he was made commander of the Russian destroyer Luga but he was arrested for 2 weeks for landing neglect of the destroyer on December 3, 1890. Ignatius was then made the senior officer of the Russian monitor Smerch from 1891 to 1892 and on January 1, 1893, he was promoted to Captain 2nd Rank. From 1893 to 1894, he was transferred to command the Russian destroyer Vzryv before being put on the Russian Pacific Squadron as senior officer of the Russian cruiser Razboynik. He was promoted to 1st Class Mine Officer on March 21, 1896, and transferred to the Baltic Fleet as commander of the Russian monitor Uragan. He was transferred again to the Far East as commander of the Russian cruiser Vsadnik and then as commander of the Russian cruiser Manjur on June 1, 1899. On November 21, 1899, Ignatius was sent back to the Baltic Fleet to command destroyers and their crews at Kronstadt. He was promoted to Captain 1st Rank on April 1, 1901, and later given command of the Knyaz Suvorov on October 22. During the Russo-Japanese War, he commanded the Knyaz Suvorov but was killed at the Battle of Tsushima from a middle shell.

== Awards ==
- Order of Saint Stanislaus, III Class (July 5, 1883)
- Order of Saint Stanislaus, II Class (1897)
- Order of St. Vladimir, IV Class with a bow (1898)
- Order of Saint Anna, II Class (1899)
- Order of St. Vladimir, III Class (1904)

=== Foreign awards ===
- Spain: Cross of Naval Merit (December 15, 1888)
