= Nikolai Lishin =

Russian naval captain (1856–1923)

Nikolai Lishin Николай Лишин
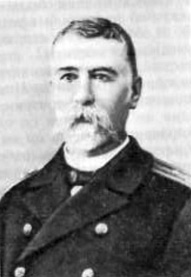
- Born: September 30, 1856; Kherson, Russia
- Died: April 16, 1923 (aged 66); Požarevac, Northern Serbia, Yugoslavia
- Alma mater: Naval Cadet Corps
- Military career
- Allegiance: Russian Empire; Russian Republic
- Branch: Imperial Russian Navy; White Army
- Service years: 1872 – 1912; 1914 – 1920
- Rank: Captain 1st rank
- Commands: General-Admiral Apraksin
- Conflicts: Russo-Turkish War; Russo-Japanese War; Battle of Tsushima (POW); World War I; Russian Civil War

Nikolai Grigorievich Lishin was a Russian Captain 1st Rank of the Russo-Japanese War and World War I. He commanded the General-Admiral Apraksin during the Battle of Tsushima and suffered an arrest of 4 years after surrendering the ship.

== Biography ==
Nikolai was born on September 30, 1856, into a noble family from the Kherson Governorate as his parents were Lieutenant-General Grigory Nikolaevich Lishin and his wife Antonina Nikolaevna (née Erdeli). On September 15, 1872, Lishin attended the Naval Cadet Corps and graduated as a Gardes de la Marine on May 1, 1876, and promoted to Michman on August 30, 1877. He then partook in the Russo-Turkish War while serving in the Black Sea Fleet and made a part of the 5th Naval Crew on January 2, 1880. On October 21, 1881, Lishin took courses at the Training Artillery Detachment to become a senior artillery officer and was promoted to Lieutenant on January 1, 1882. He also received his first command as he commanded the 3rd company of the monitor Rusalka as well as beginning to teach courses on artillery and command. By May 30, 1884, he was the battery commander of the frigate General-Admiral, head of the galvanic firing instruments of the ship on September 30, 1885, and commander of the second company on January 17, 1886.

From June 1, 1886, to April 8, 1888, he was an artillery officer aboard the Petr Veliky and later, the senior officer on October 13, 1888, but was then transferred to become the senior officer of the Vladimir Monomakh on May 8, 1889. From May 31, 1891, to April 12, 1892, he was the flagship artillery officer within the headquarters of the Pacific Squadron before being assigned to the Veschun on January 1, 1893, and began focusing on the shipbuilding and mines of the ship on May 21, 1893. Lishin was then transferred to the Imperator Aleksandr II from January 1, 1894, to 1896 while also being promoted to Captain 2nd Rank on April 17, 1894. On May 9, 1896, he was made acting commander of the Artelshchik port and was given command of the Korietz. After briefly attending the Nikolaev Naval Academy, he graduated on 1896 and made the senior officer of the Admiral Kornilov on July 29, 1896. Beginning in 1897, he returned to command the Veshun, the gunboat Sneg on September 22, 1897, and the gunboat Dozhd on December 6, 1897. From December 6, 1898, to 1899, he commanded the Groza and was transferred to the Voivoda from December 6, 1899, to 1901.

Lishin then commanded the Admiral Greig from December 6, 1901, to December 17, 1902, and was promoted to Captain 1st Rank in the same year. After given command of the on General-Admiral Apraksin on April 6, 1903, he took the ship to participate in the Battle of Tsushima but surrendered the ship during the battle. After being released, Lishin was stripped of all his ranks and awards and arrested at Saint Petersburg on August 22, 1905. He was initially supposed to serve 10 years in prison and potentially even death but he was pardoned by Nikolai II on May 1, 1909. After initially retiring in 1912, Lishin re-enlisted for service following the Russian entry into World War I as a volunteer. He served as a fireworksman of the 2nd division of the 4th Heavy Artillery Brigade. In 1915, during the inspection, Emperor Nikolai II noticed a gray-bearded soldier with awards for bravery and, having learned who it was, restored all of his awards and Lishin was promoted back to Captain 1st Rank. On August 17, 1915, was placed back in the 2nd Baltic Naval Crew. The Maritime magazine later wrote of this experience, describing it as:

Deprived of ranks, orders and nobility, sentenced to 10 years in a fortress, the former captain Lishin was left even by his wife. When the Great War began, he applied to the Highest Name for permission to go to the front as a volunteer - a lower rank. Permission has been granted. A gray-haired, aged man stepped out of the fortress. He was assigned to the active army - to the artillery. When he was at the front in the summer of 1915, the Tsar noticed an unusual-looking soldier, on whose chest hung the St. George Cross of the IV degree. Upon learning that this was a former captain of the 1st rank Lishin and asking about the exploits for which he was given George, the Sovereign forgave N. G. and returned to him everything that had been lost in court. Circular of the GMSH dated 17 Aug. 1915 for No. 507-238 <...> k. 1. p. Nikolai Lishin was again enrolled in the 2nd Baltic naval crew.

— Letter from N. N. Lishin. Maritime magazine. 1928. No. 11. S. 39

He was transferred to the Black Sea Fleet on September 22, 1915, and from November 1915 to September 1916, he served as the head of the operational sect of the rear of the Black Sea Fleet. On October 29, 1916, he commanded Transport No. 81 (Equator). After the Russian Civil War broke out, Lishin served in the White Army but after the defeat of the Army, he and his wife fled from Novorossiysk on March 20, 1920, aboard Burgermeister Schroeder and settled in Yugoslavia in Spring 1921, dying at Požarevac.

== Awards ==
- War with Turkey (1877–78) Commemorative Medal
- Order of Saint Stanislaus, II Class (1895)
- Order of Saint Anna, II Class (December 6, 1901)
- Order of Saint Vladimir, IV Class (1903) for 20 companies under his command
- Cross of St. George (awarded 4 times)
