= Dmitry Gustavovich von Fölkersahm =

Russian admiral (1846–1905)

Baron Dmitry Gustavovich von Fölkersahm
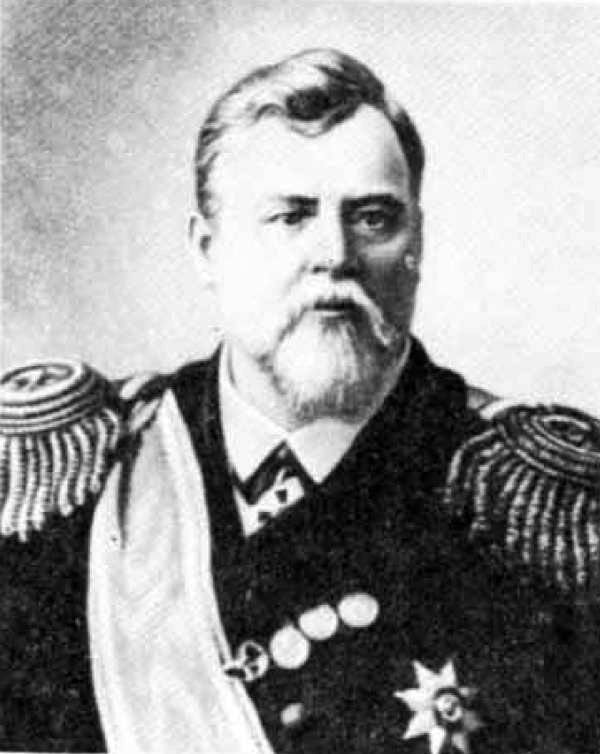
- Born: 29 April 1846; Papenhof Manor, Rutzau, Grobin County, Courland Governorate, Russian Empire (in Rucava, Nīca Municipality, Latvia)
- Died: 24 May 1905 (aged 59) off Tsushima
- Military career
- Allegiance: Russian Empire
- Branch: Imperial Russian Navy
- Service years: 1867–1905
- Rank: Rear Admiral
- Commands: 2nd Pacific Squadron,
- Conflicts: Russo-Japanese War
- Awards: Order of St. Stanislav; Order of St Anna; Order of St Vladimir; Order of the Rising Sun (Japan)

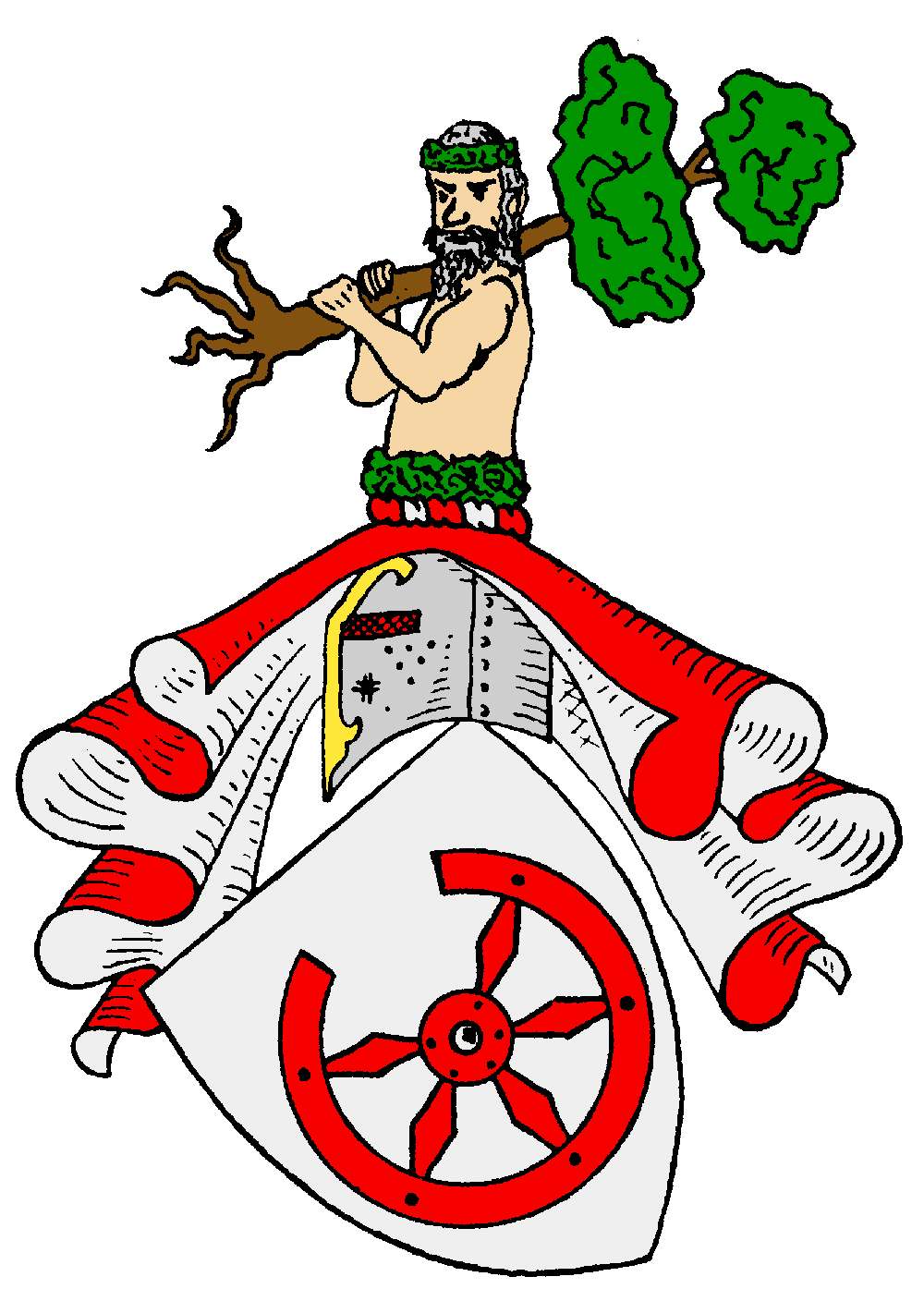
Coat of arms

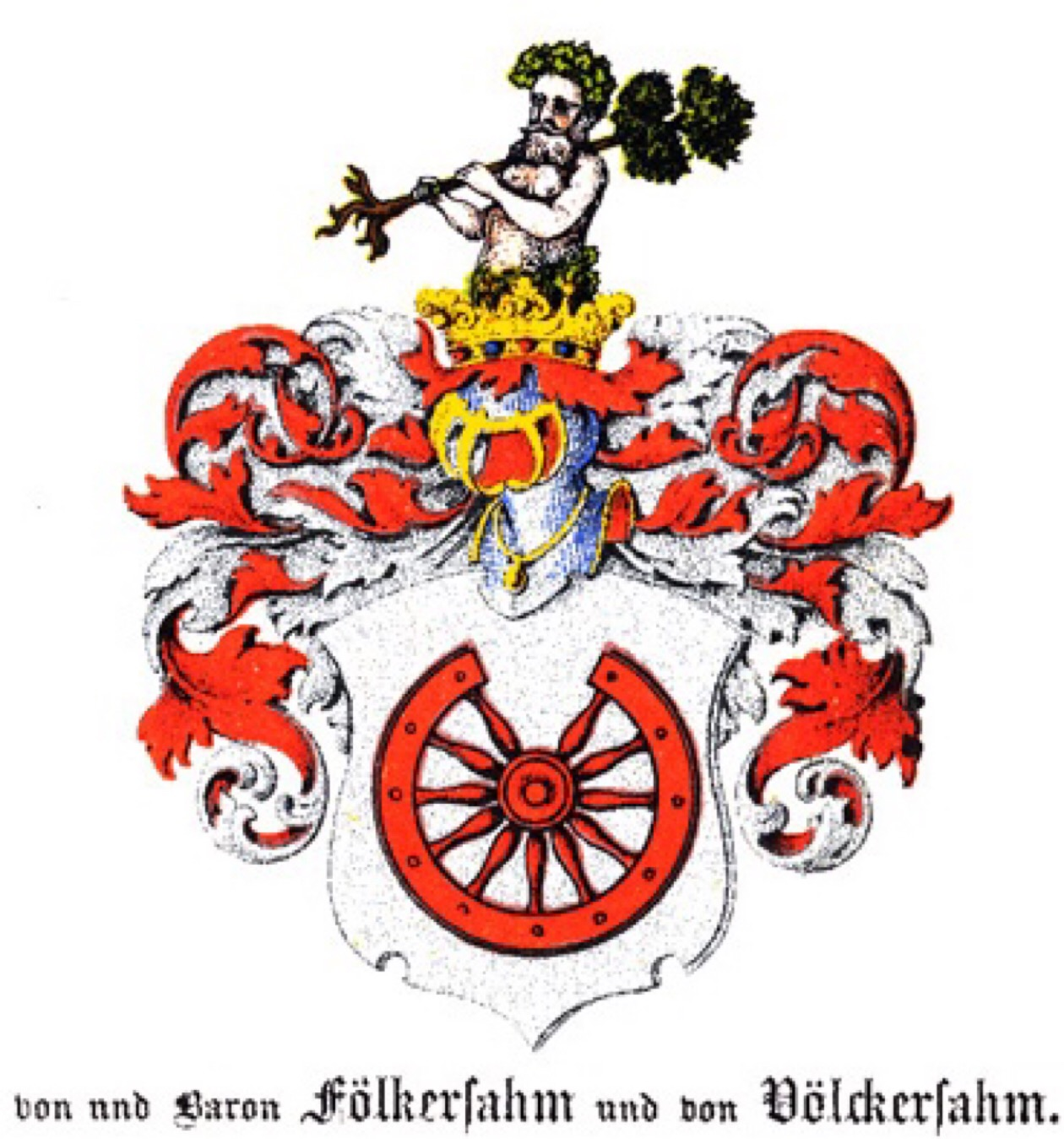
Coat of arms of the untitled and baronial Fölkersahm family, which belonged to the Uradels, in the Baltic Coat of arms book by Carl Arvid von Klingspor in 1882.

Baron Dmitry Gustavovich Fyolkerzam (Russian: Дмитрий Густавович Фёлькерзам, tr. Dmitriy Gustavovich Fyol’kerzam; 29 April 1846 – 24 May 1905), better known as Baron Dmitry Gustavovich von Fölkersahm, was a Russian admiral of Baltic German descent who served in the Imperial Russian Navy.

== Biography ==
The Fölkersahm noble family (de) is of Lower Saxon origin, originating in Springe of the Duchy of Saxony and belongs to the Uradel. It had a long history of service to the Russian Empire. The father of Dmitry Gustavovich was Gustav Johann Georg von Fölkersahm, a general in the Imperial Russian Army, while his grandfather, Jakob Joachim von Fölkersahm, was the commanding officer of the Tula Arsenal. After the Reformation, the family was Lutheran, but Fölkersahm's father married a Russian Orthodox woman, and his children, including Dmitry Gustavovich, were brought up in the Eastern Orthodox Church.

Fölkersahm entered the Sea Cadet Corps in 1860, graduating at the top of his class of cadets in 1867. Promoted to lieutenant in 1871, he served as a gunnery officer aboard the ironclad Pervenets in 1883. He was on the Vladimir Monomakh September 1884 to September 1887. On 26 February 1885 he was promoted to captain, 2nd rank. In 1891 he was appointed commanding officer of the clipper Dzhigit and was promoted to captain, 1st rank, on 1 January 1893. Fölkersahm was commander of the Imperator Nikolai I from 1 January 1895 to 12 October 1899 in the Russian Pacific Fleet. He was promoted to rear admiral on 6 December 1899. From February 1900, Fölkersahm headed a commission to improve the state of naval artillery, and two years later became commandant of the naval gunnery school for the Russian Baltic Fleet in St. Petersburg.

During the Russo-Japanese War, Fölkersahm was appointed commander of the 2nd battleship division of the 2nd Pacific Squadron, with the battleship Oslyabya as his flagship. The squadron departed the Baltic Sea on 15 October 1904 under the command of Admiral Zinovy Rozhestvensky on a voyage around the southern tip of Africa, across the Indian Ocean and north to the Tsushima Straits in an attempt to relieve the Japanese blockade of Port Arthur. Fölkersahm was already seriously ill with cancer. Rozhestvensky was aware of Fölkersahm's condition, and when the fleet reached Tangier, he assigned Fölkersahm to an independent command consisting of five older warships and several transports, which transited the Suez Canal and rejoined the main fleet at Nossi Be in Madagascar. However, Fölkersahm was incapacitated from early April 1905. On 24 May 1905, shortly before reaching the Sea of Japan, he died. Rozhestvensky, concerned with the effect of Fölkersahm's death on morale, ordered that the news be kept secret from the crew and the rest of the fleet. Fölkersahm's body was placed in the cold store of the ship, and his flag was kept flying on the Oslyabya. Command of the second armoured unit was quietly transferred to captain Vladimir Baer with the crew given the impression that he was taking orders from an indisposed Fölkersahm. During the Battle of Tsushima three days later, Oslyabya was the first ship to be sunk by the Imperial Japanese Navy, and Fölkersahm's body went down with his ship.

== Awards and decorations ==
- Silver Life Saving Medal (10 October 1869)
- Gold Life Saving Medal (8 November 1874)
- Order of Saint Stanislaus, 2nd class (15 May 1883), previously 3rd class (6 August 1873)
- Gold Life Saving Medal with a bow (22 September 1885) to save the drowning sailor overboard 2 April 1885 during the Nagasaki raid
- Order of the Rising Sun, 3rd class (Japan, 9 July 1891)
- Order of St. Vladimir, 3rd class (30 October 1895); previously 4th class (22 September 1887)
- Order of St. Anna, 1st class (6 December 1904); previously 2nd class (1 January 1890) and 3rd class (1 January 1881)
- Order of Prince Danilo I, 2nd class (Montenegro), (1897)
