= Vladimir Baer =

Russian naval captain (1853–1905)

- Владимир Иосифович Бэр
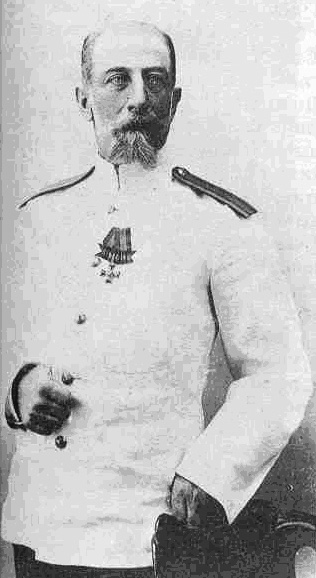
- Born: November 12, 1853; Yelnya, Smolensk, Russia
- Died: May 27, 1905 (aged 51); Straits of Tsushima
- Alma mater: Naval Cadet Corps
- Military career
- Allegiance: Russia
- Branch: Imperial Russian Navy
- Service years: 1870–1905
- Rank: Captain 1st rank
- Unit: Second Pacific Squadron
- Commands: Oslyabya
- Conflicts: Russo-Japanese War; Battle of Tsushima †

Vladimir Iosifovich Baer (Russian: Владимир Иосифович Бэр; November 12, 1853 – May 27, 1905) was a Russian Captain 1st rank of the Russo-Japanese War. He commanded the Oslyabya, the flagship of the Second Division, during the Battle of Tsushima before being killed in the battle.

== Biography ==
On September 16, 1870, Baer was accepted as a student into the Naval Cadet Corps and graduated on March 31, 1871 as a Garde de la Marine. By April 12, 1874 he was assigned to the 1st Naval Crew and promoted to midshipman on August 30, 1875.

Baer received his first command when he was assigned to the Latnik on January 30, 1876, before being transferred to the Siberian Flotilla on April 9, 1876. He arrived at Shanghai on August 1, 1876, to retrieve the gunboat Sable three days later, before being given command of the 3rd Company of Siberian Naval Crew from December 20, 1877 to January 11, 1878. He was then assigned to the Vostok on March 3, 1878, becoming the auditor on September 29, 1878. By July 4, 1879, he was transferred to the clipper Abrek as the auditor before being promoted to Lieutenant on January 1, 1880, but was decommissioned on October 21 due to poor health from being in Siberia.

On April 11, 1881 he was transferred to the Baltic Fleet and arrived at a new station by September 30, 1881. Baer was made the inspector of the corvette Boyarin on October 20, 1882, and was transferred to the 7th Naval Crew. On May 30, 1884 he was transferred to the 5th Naval Crew aboard the Dzhigit and from June 24, 1885, to July 6, 1887, as the auditor.

Baer received training about naval mines from January 13 to March 29, 1888, and on March 26, 1890 became the senior officer of the monitor Lava.

He became the senior officer of the armoured boat Enchantress of the 10th Naval Crew on October 1, 1891, and the senior officer of the clipper Kreyser on January 1, 1892, but was arrested on December 9, 1894, for violating Article 185 of the naval code. He was released on February 18, 1895 by order of the Minister of the Navy and given command of the port ship Moguchiy two days later.

From February 5, 1896 to December 11, 1897 he was given command of the mine cruiser Lieutenant Ilyin. He became a full-time student of the Nikolaev Naval Academy from August 13, 1896, to May 10, 1897, as part of its naval science class. From December 6, 1897, to March 22, 1899, he was given command of the gunboat Khrabryy and on March 22, 1899, he went to Philadelphia to oversee the construction of the Retvizan and the Varyag. He was promoted to Captain 1st rank on April 18, 1899. On January 1, 1900, Baer was transferred to the 13th Naval Crew and brought the Varyag back to Russia on January 29, 1901.

On July 2, 1901 he was made chairman of the artillery at the Geisler and Co. electrical plant installed on the Varyag but surrendered command on March 1, 1903. By July 14, 1903, he requested a two-month leave due to illness and from December 6, 1903, to January 26, 1904, he was given command of the 17th Naval Crew. From January 26 to May 17, 1904, he was given command of the 5th Naval Crew along with Grand Duke Alexei Alexandrovich and commanded the Oslyabya on May 17, 1904. Despite being offered the chance to remain in Kronstadt and be promoted to the rank of rear-admiral, he remained on the battleship, when it became Rear Admiral Baron Dmitry von Fölkersam's flagship in the Second Pacific Squadron. After the Oslyabya began sinking during the Battle of Tsushima, Baer refused to leave the battleship and opted to go down with the ship.

== Awards ==
- Order of Saint Stanislaus, III Class (January 1, 1884)
- Order of Saint Anna, III Class (January 1, 1889)
- Order of Saint Stanislaus, II Class (1894)
- Medal of the Reign of Alexander III(March 21, 1896)
- Order of Saint Anna, II Class (December 6, 1896)
- Medal of the Coronation of Nicholas II
- Order of Saint Vladimir, IV Class with a bow for 20 naval campaigns (1901)
- Order of St. Vladimir, III Class (December 6, 1904)

=== Foreign Awards ===
- China: Order of the Double Dragon, 2nd and 3rd Class (1902)
- Denmark: Order of the Dannebrog, Commander's Cross with Star (1901)
- Germany: Order of the Red Eagle, 2nd Class (1901)
- France: Legion of Honour, Officer (1901)
