= Ogura Byōichirō =

- 小倉 鋲一郎
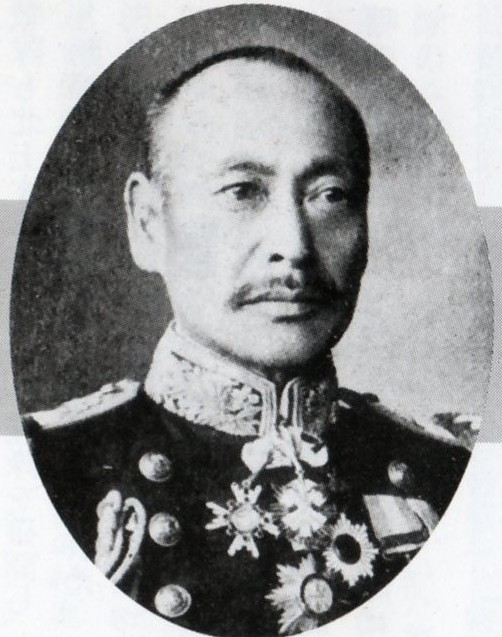
- Born: October 25, 1853; Edo, Japan
- Died: December 23, 1928 (aged 75)
- Military career
- Allegiance: Empire of Japan
- Branch: Imperial Japanese Navy
- Service years: 1881–1909
- Rank: Vice Admiral
- Conflicts: First Sino-Japanese War; Russo-Japanese War

Ogura Byōichirō (小倉 鋲一郎; 25 October 1853 – 23 December 1928) was an admiral in the early Imperial Japanese Navy.

== Life and military career ==
Ogura was born to a samurai family serving the Tokugawa shogunate in Edo. He entered the 5th class of the Imperial Japanese Naval Academy in July 1878 and was commissioned as a second lieutenant in January 1881. His classmates included Ijuin Gorō and Dewa Shigetō. He served as a squad leader on the ironclad Ryūjō and the cruiser Takachiho, and as executive officer on the corvettes Musashi, Yamato and Kaimon. He was promoted to lieutenant commander in 1891 and was on the staff of the Personnel Department of the Ministry of the Navy of Japan in March 1893. The following year, he was executive officer of the cruiser Takao.

During the First Sino-Japanese War of 1894-1895, Ogura was executive officer on the Matsushima. He received his first command, the gunboat Chōkai on 27 August 1895 and remained captain until 4 February 1897. After commanding the cruiser Tatsuta from 4 February 1897 to 1 June 1897, he was promoted to captain and was appointed captain of the cruiser Takao. From September 1898 he was captain of the cruiser Hashidate. In May 1899, Ogura was sent to France to oversee the completion of the cruiser Azuma, of which he remained captain until 24 May 1902. He then captained the battleship Asahi from 24 May 1902 to 21 November 1903. Afterwards, he was chief-of-staff of the Yokosuka Naval District. At the start of the Russo-Japanese War of 1904-1905, Ogura was promoted to rear admiral and was appointed 8th Division of the Japanese Third Fleet, a motley collection of obsolete warships which served as a final reserve force at the Battle of Tsushima. After the war, he returned to the Personnel Bureau of the Ministry of the Navy, and was promoted to vice admiral in 1908. He went into the reserves the following year.
