= Japanese cruiser Tatsuta (1894) =

Unprotected cruiser of the Imperial Japanese Navy

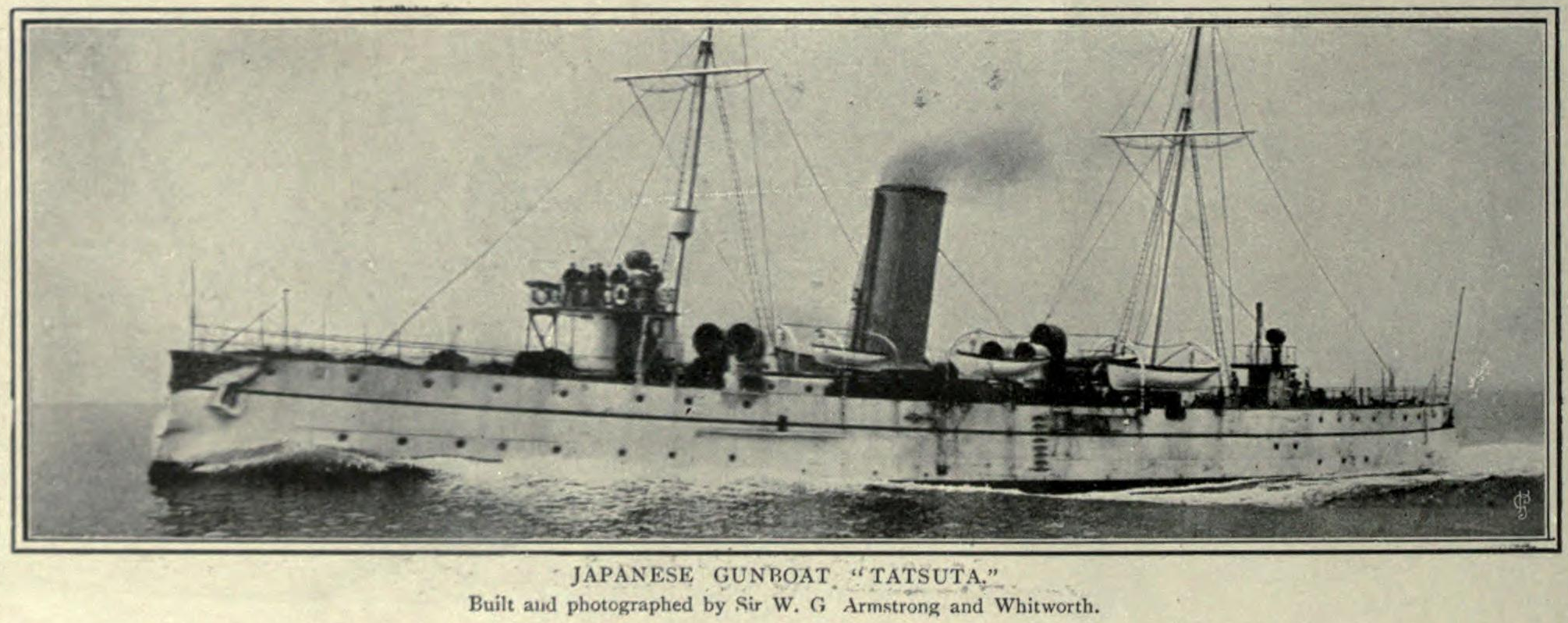
- Tatsuta, photo by Armstrong Whitworth

History

Empire of Japan
- Name: Tatsuta
- Ordered: 1891 Fiscal Year
- Builder: Armstrong, Mitchell, UK
- Laid down: 7 April 1893
- Launched: 6 April 1894
- Completed: 31 July 1894
- Decommissioned: 1 April 1916
- Reclassified: 9 December 1916
- Stricken: 26 March 1926
- Fate: Scrapped 6 April 1926

General characteristics
- Type: Unprotected cruiser
- Displacement: 650 long tons (660 t)
- Length: 77.1 m (253.0 ft)
- Beam: 8.38 m (27.5 ft)
- Draft: 2.9 m (9.5 ft)
- Propulsion: 2-shaft reciprocating VTE, 5,069 ihp (3,780 kW), 200 tons coal
- Speed: 21 knots (24 mph; 39 km/h)
- Complement: 100
- Armament: 2 × QF 4.7 inch Gun Mk I–IVs; 4 × QF 3 pounder Hotchkiss guns; 5 × 18 in (460 mm) torpedo tubes

Tatsuta (龍田) was an unprotected cruiser of the Imperial Japanese Navy. The name Tatsuta comes from the Tatsuta River, near Nara. Tatsuta was used by the Imperial Japanese Navy primarily as an aviso (dispatch boat) used for scouting, reconnaissance and delivery of priority messages.

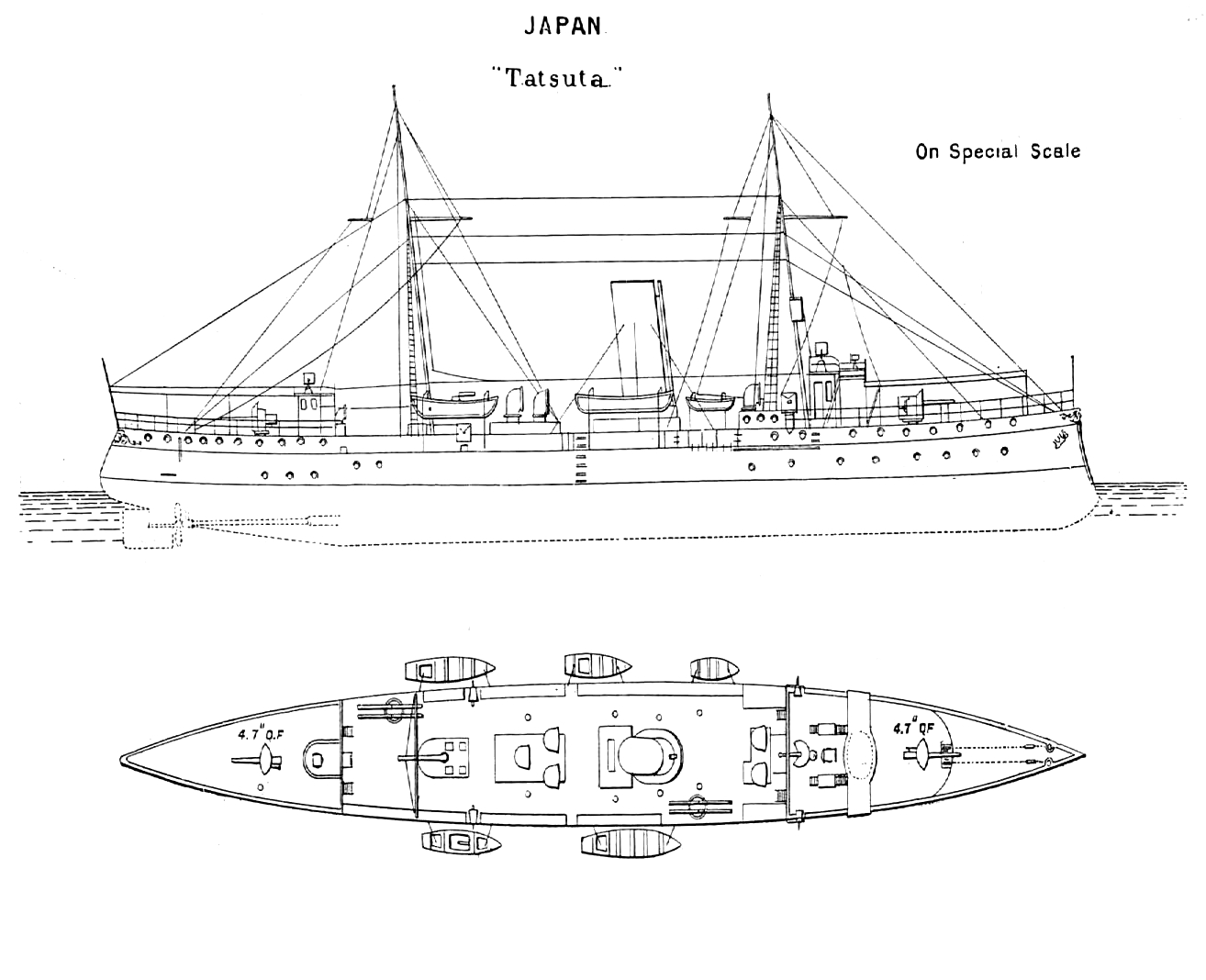
Line drawing of Tatsuta

== Background ==
Tatsuta was ordered from Armstrong Whitworth in Elswick, Newcastle upon Tyne, England as a large torpedo boat under the 1891 Fiscal Year budget as a replacement for the ill-fated Chishima.

== Design ==
Tatsuta had a steel hull and retained a full barque rigging with two masts for auxiliary sail propulsion in addition to her steam engine. She was armed with two QF 4.7 inch Gun Mk I–IVs guns, four QF 3 pounder Hotchkiss guns, five 2.5-pounder guns and five torpedo tubes, mounted on the deck.

== Service record ==
Rushed through production due to the impending First Sino-Japanese War, Tatsuta was en route to Japan when hostilities commenced, and she was impounded in the port of Aden on 28 August 1894 by British authorities, as the United Kingdom took an official position of neutrality in that conflict. She was not allowed to reach Japan until 19 March 1895, after the war was over. On 21 March 1896, Tatsuta was re-classified as a dispatch vessel. In 1900, she was assigned to assist in escorting transports supporting Japanese naval landing forces which occupied the port city of Tianjin in northern China during the Boxer Rebellion, as part of the Japanese contribution to the Eight-Nation Alliance. In 1902, she underwent overhaul at Kure Naval Arsenal, where she became the first vessel in the Japanese navy to have her locomotive-type cylindrical boilers were replaced with high pressure Niclausse boilers.

During the Russo-Japanese War of 1904–1905, Tatsuta participated in the naval Battle of Port Arthur and subsequent blockade of that port. Despite her small size and obsolescence, she was also present at the Battle of the Yellow Sea and the final decisive Battle of Tsushima. During the war, she assisted in the rescue of crewmen from the battleships Yashima and Hatsuse when those ships had been sunk by Russian naval mines, and Admiral Nashiba Tokioki transferred his flag to Tatsuta after this disaster. However, Tatsuta ran aground in the Elliot Islands outside the entrance to Port Arthur that day, and had to be refloated and then repaired at Yokosuka Naval Arsenal from 16 July to 31 August 1904.

On 28 August 1912, Tatsuta was re-classified as a 1st class gunboat. She was officially struck from the navy list as a combat vessel on 1 April 1916 and her armaments removed. However, she was retained by the navy for use as a utility vessel and was designated as a submarine tender on 9 December 1916 and renamed Nagaura Maru (長浦丸). The name was shortened to Nagaura on 1 July 1920. She was retired after her second career again on 12 March 1926, and was sold for scrap on 6 April 1926.
