= Japanese cruiser Takao (1888) =

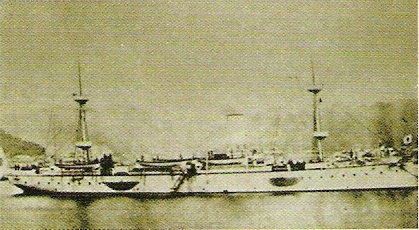
- Takao at Yokosuka, October 1889

History

Empire of Japan
- Name: Takao
- Builder: Yokosuka Shipyards
- Laid down: 30 October 1886
- Launched: 15 October 1888
- Completed: 16 November 1889
- Stricken: 1 April 1911
- Fate: Scrapped, 27 March 1912

General characteristics
- Type: Unprotected cruiser
- Displacement: 1,750 long tons (1,778 t)
- Length: 69.9 m (229.3 ft)
- Beam: 10.4 m (34.1 ft)
- Draught: 3.9 m (12.8 ft)
- Installed power: 2,330 ihp (1,740 kW)
- Propulsion: 2 shafts, 2 Horizontal compound steam engines, 5 boilers
- Speed: 15 knots (28 km/h; 17 mph)
- Complement: 220
- Armament: 4 × 15 cm (5.9 in) L/35 Krupp guns; 1 × QF 4.7 inch Gun Mk I–IV gun; 1 × QF 6-pounder Hotchkiss gun; 2 × quadruple 1-inch Nordenfelt guns; 2 × 356 mm (14.0 in) torpedo tubes

Takao (高雄) was an unprotected cruiser of the Imperial Japanese Navy. The name Takao comes from the Mount Takao, near Kyoto. Takao was used by the Imperial Japanese Navy primarily as an aviso or dispatch boat, for scouting, reconnaissance and the conveying of important messages.

== Background ==
Takao was designed under the supervision of French military advisor Émile Bertin, and built in Japan by the Yokosuka Naval Arsenal, with many of its components imported from overseas. It was one of the first ships in Bertin's project to introduce modern naval construction techniques to the Japanese, and a first step in the implementation of his Jeune Ecole naval strategy of using of small, heavily armed and lightly armored ships in naval warfare. Due to its small size Takao is sometimes classified as a corvette or gunboat.

== Design ==
Takao was a steel-ribbed and steel-hulled vessel. It retained a full barque rigging with two masts for auxiliary sail propulsion in addition to her coal-fired double-expansion reciprocating steam engine with single smoke stack and twin screws. The design incorporated a number of firsts for Japan, including a double hull amidships for additional protection, and the first Japanese built torpedo launchers. It was also the second warship to be built in Japan (after the gunboat Akagi) with an iron-rib and steel hull construction. Takao was armed with four 15 cm (5.9 in) L/35 Krupp guns mounted in sponsons as its main battery and had one stern-mounted QF 4.7 inch Gun Mk I–IVs gun and one QF 6-pounder Hotchkiss gun as its secondary battery. In addition, the ship had two quadruple 1-inch Nordenfelt guns and carried two torpedoes, mounted on the deck.

== Service record ==
Takao was laid down on 30 October 1886, launched on 15 October 1888 and completed on 16 November 1889. Takao's first captain was Commander Yamamoto Gonnohyōe.

Takao was active in the First Sino-Japanese War of 1894–1895, protecting troop transports to Korea, and covering the landing of Japanese forces at Port Arthur. It was subsequently involved in patrols of the Yellow Sea and was present at the Battle of Weihaiwei.

In 1900, Takao's rigging was removed, and weaponry modernized. Takao was assigned to assist in escorting transports supporting Japanese naval landing forces which occupied the port city of Tianjin in northern China during the Boxer Rebellion, as part of the Japanese contribution to the Eight-Nation Alliance, and subsequently patrolled the coasts off Amoy and Shanghai.

Considered obsolete by the time of the Russo-Japanese War of 1904–1905, Takao was assigned to rear guard patrols of Chemulpo harbor and Tsushima Strait, but was present with the rest of the Japanese fleet at the final decisive Battle of Tsushima.

The advent of wireless communication made the use of dispatch vessels obsolete, and Takao was removed from the navy list on 1 April 1911 and was demilitarized and sold on 27 March 1912. The ship was used as a survey vessel until being broken up in 1918.
