= Naval Cadet Corps (Russia) =

Military school in Saint Petersburg

Coordinates: 59.995°N 29.756°E

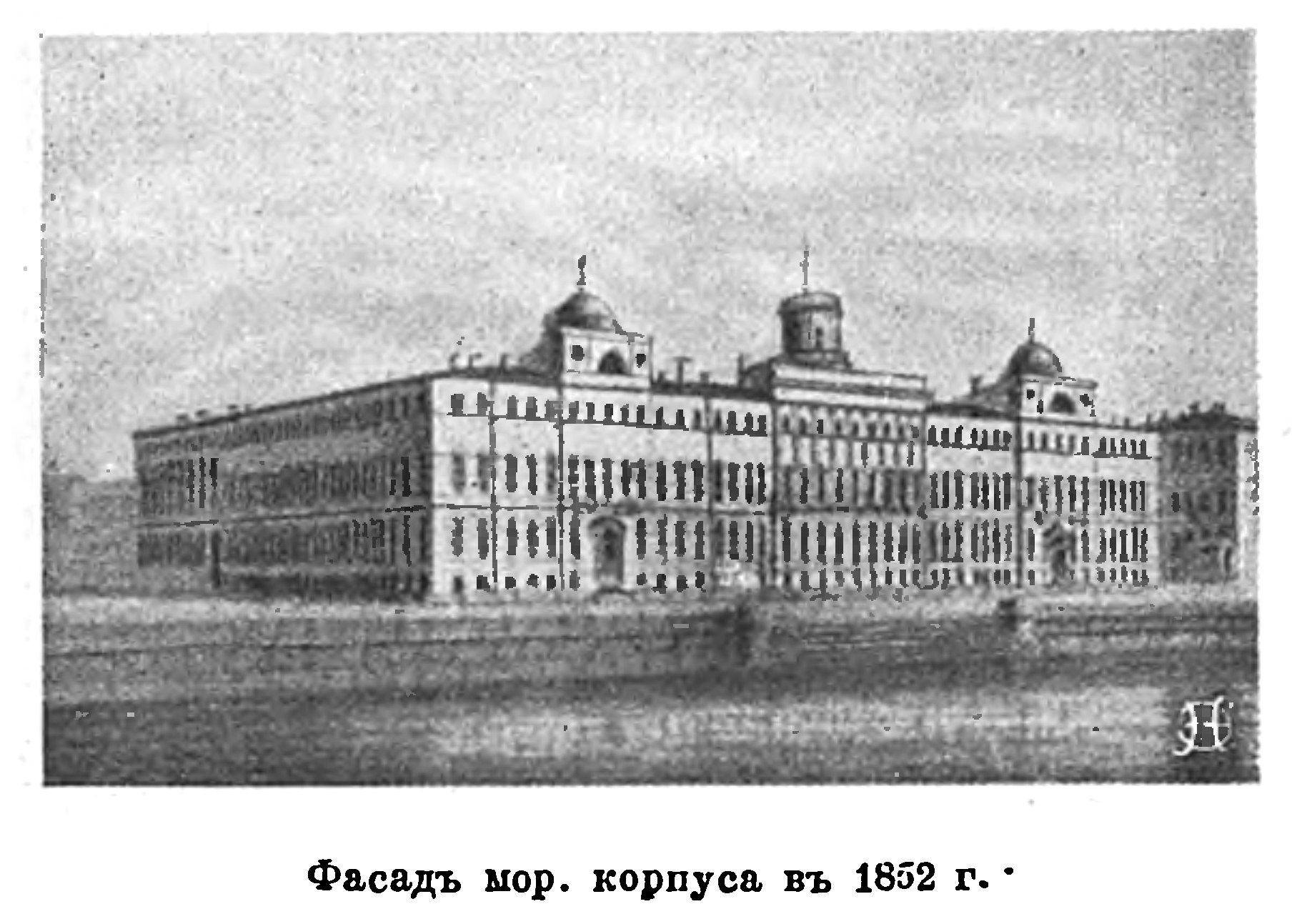
The building of the Naval Cadet Corps in 1852

The Naval Cadet Corps (Russian: Морской кадетский корпус, romanized: Morskoy kadetskiy korpus), occasionally translated as the Marine Cadet Corps or the Sea Cadet Corps, was an educational establishment for educating naval officers for commissioning in the Imperial Russian Navy in Saint Petersburg. The Saint Petersburg Naval Institute traces its lineage from the Naval Cadet Corps.

== History ==
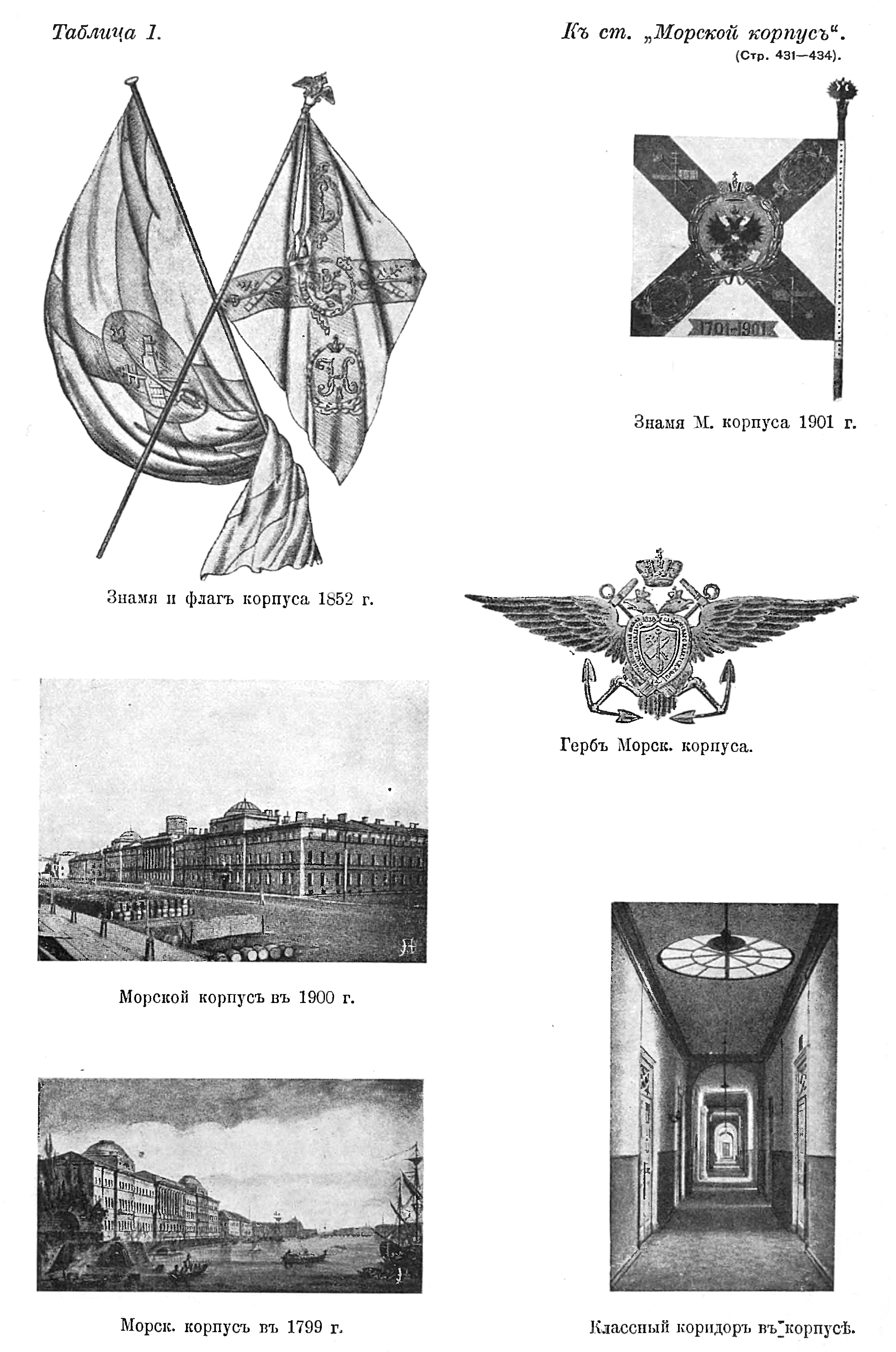
Naval Cadet Corps (Russia)

The first maritime educational school was established by Peter the Great in Moscow as the School of Navigation and Mathematical Sciences by his decree of 14 January 1701. A branch of the school was created in 1713 as the Naval Guards Academy or the Saint Petersburg Naval Academy. The first instructor there was an Englishman who entered Russian service in 1698, and Peter the Great personally took an interest in the running of the academy. The Moscow Navigation School and the Naval Guard Academy were combined as the Naval Gentry Cadet Corps on 15 December 1752 and it became the key educational establishment commissioning officers for the Imperial Russian Navy. In 1762 it was renamed the Naval Cadet Corps.

Following the destruction of the building in a fire in 1771 the school transferred to Kronstadt until 1796, when the Emperor Paul I (who held the rank of general admiral of the navy) ordered a new building in the capital. A new building on the Neva River embankment on Vasilievsky Island was built to house the school. In 1827 a class for officers was created (later becoming the Naval Academy). The Corps was renamed to the Naval School in the 1860s military reforms before its name was restored as Naval Cadet Corps in 1891. Graduates were commissioned with the rank of michman in the Imperial Navy.

== Post Revolution ==
The school closed in March 1918. On 15 September 1918, a special order established courses for the navy command staff, which opened on 10 October in the former Naval School building. The courses educated officers for the new Red Navy. In 1926 the school was named the M.V. Frunze Higher Naval School. The school was merged with the Higher Naval School of Submarine Navigation in 1998, and renamed the Saint Petersburg Naval Institute. In 2001, it received the name Peter the Great Naval Corps - Saint Petersburg Naval Institute, marking the 300th anniversary of naval education in Russia.
