= List of shipwrecks in August 1869 =

The list of shipwrecks in August 1869 includes ships sunk, foundered, grounded, or otherwise lost during August 1869.

== 1 August ==
List of shipwrecks: 1 August 1869
Ship	State	Description
Nepaul	United Kingdom	The barque was driven ashore at Eastern Head, Newfoundland Colony. Her crew were rescued. She was on a voyage from Quebec City, Canada to Lowestoft, Suffolk.

== 2 August ==
List of shipwrecks: 2 August 1869
Ship	State	Description
Atalanta, and François I	United Kingdom; France	The steamship Atalanta collided with the steamship François I at Havre de Grâce, Seine-Inférieure and ran aground. She was on a voyage from London to New York, United States. She was refloated. François I was severely damaged.
Diligence	United Kingdom	The ship ran aground on the Cockle Sand, in the North Sea off the coast of Norfolk. She was on a voyage from Sunderland, County Durham to Rouen, Seine-Inférieure, France.
Drammen	Norway	The ship was wrecked near Hardø. She was on a voyage from Arkhangelsk, Russia to London, United Kingdom.
Margaret	United Kingdom	The schooner foundered in the Atlantic Ocean (39°30′N 10°50′W). Her crew were rescued by the schooner Lisonjeiro (Portugal). Margaret was on a voyage from Lisbon, Portugal to Cardiff, Glamorgan.
Pauline David	Flag unknown	The ship caught fire at the mouth of the Mississippi River and was scuttled. She was on a voyage from Liverpool, Lancashire, United Kingdom to New Orleans, Louisiana, United States.
São João	Portugal	The ship ran aground on the Cabadello. She was on a voyage from Porto to Pernambuco, Brazil. She was refloated and resumed her voyage.
Trafalgar	United Kingdom	The Mersey Flat foundered in the River Mersey with the loss of five of the seven people on board.

== 3 August ==
List of shipwrecks: 3 August 1869
Ship	State	Description
Flying Venus	United Kingdom	The ship capsized at Liverpool, Lancashire.
Ora	Hamburg	The brigantine was wrecked in the Rio Grande. She was on a voyage from Bahia, Brazil to the Rio Grande.
Persia	United Kingdom	The steamship sank at Liverpool.
Valiant	United Kingdom	The ship foundered 18 nautical miles (33 km) west of "Chasseron", France. Her crew were rescued. She was on a voyage from Cardiff, Glamorgan to Bordeaux, Gironde France.

== 4 August ==
List of shipwrecks: 4 August 1869
Ship	State	Description
Hindoo	United Kingdom	The ship foundered off the west coast of Scotland with the loss of eighteen of her 26 crew. Eight survivors took to a raft, feared they would be lost too, according to a message in a bottle washed up near Aberdeen on 5 October.
Nuova Giusseppina	Italy	The ship was driven ashore. She was on a voyage from Sulina, Ottoman Empire to Queenstown, County Cork, United Kingdom. She was refloated and taken in to Gibraltar.
Wirralite	United Kingdom	The ship struck a sunken rock and put in to Ardrossan, Ayrshire in a leaky condition. She was on a voyage from Liverpool, Lancashire to Cleveland, Ohio, United States.

== 5 August ==
List of shipwrecks: 5 August 1869
Ship	State	Description
Bertha Louise	Chile	The barque foundered in the Pacific Ocean. Her crew took to a longboat and a pinnace. An offer to be taken on board Magnet (United Kingdom) the next day was refused, the men preferring to make for land.
Dorade	France	The ship departed from "Legrie", Côtes-du-Nord for Plymouth, Devon, United Kingdom. No further trace, presumed foundered with the loss of all hands.
Vesta	Norway	The brig was wrecked of Saaremaa, Russia. Her crew were rescued. She was on a voyage from Grimsby, Lincolnshire, United Kingdom to Kronstadt, Russia.

== 6 August ==
List of shipwrecks: 6 August 1869
Ship	State	Description
Doradi	Flag unknown	The ship departed from "Legne" for Plymouth, Devon, United Kingdom. No further trace, presumed foundered with the loss of all hands.
George Durkee	United States	The ship capsized at Doboy, Texas. She was condemned.
Pfeil	Kingdom of Hawaii	The brig was lost at Cape York on the coast of the Department of Alaska (65°25′N 167°28′W). Her crew was rescued.
Zephyr	United Kingdom	The ship was driven ashore on Saaremaa, Russia. Her crew were rescued. She was on a voyage from an English port to Saint Petersburg, Russia.

== 7 August ==
List of shipwrecks: 7 August 1869
Ship	State	Description
Emma	United Kingdom	The brigantine was wrecked on the Isle of Whithorn, Wigtownshire. Her crew were rescued. She was on a voyage from Belfast, County Antrim to Maryport, Cumberland or vice versa.
Germania	Hamburg	The Hammonia-class ocean liner was wrecked in Trepassey Bay 8 nautical miles (15 km) west of Cape Race, Newfoundland Colony. All 259 people on board were rescued. She was on a voyage from New York, United States to Hamburg.
Hidalgo	United Kingdom	The brig was driven ashore at Lime Point, California, United States.
Sir William Wallace	United Kingdom	The schooner ran aground off Southport, Lancashire. She was on a voyage from Dundalk, County Louth to Preston, Lancashire. She was refloated with assistance from the Lytham and Southport Lifeboats and taken in to Southport.

== 8 August ==
List of shipwrecks: 8 August 1869
Ship	State	Description
Cleopatra	United Kingdom	The steamship was wrecked in Trepassey Bay. All on board were rescued. She was on a voyage from Montreal, Ontario, Canada to London.
Mary Bottwood	United Kingdom	The schooner was run down and sunk in the English Channel off Hastings, Sussex by the steamship Deutschland (Hamburg) with the loss of three of her four crew. The survivor was rescued by Deutschland.

== 9 August ==
List of shipwrecks: 9 August 1869
Ship	State	Description
Alma	United Kingdom	The brig foundered in the North Sea. Her crew were rescued by the brig Queenstown (United Kingdom). Alma was on a voyage from Hartlepool, County Durham to Kronstadt, Russia.
Fede	Italy	The brig collided with a brigantine and foundered in the Atlantic Ocean 10 nautical miles (19 km) south of Flores Island, Azores. Two of her eleven crew were rescued by the brigantine; the rest reached Flores Island in their boat. She was on a voyage from the west coast of Africa to Marseille, Bouches-du-Rhône, France.
Unnamed	Flag unknown	The schooner foundered off Margate, Kent, United Kingdom with the loss of all hands.

== 10 August ==
List of shipwrecks: 10 August 1869
Ship	State	Description
Blizzard	Imperial Russian Navy	The schooner was wrecked on Ketoy, in the Kuril Islands.
Dawson	United Kingdom	The brig sprang a leak and foundered. Her crew were rescued by the schooner Advance (Norway). Dawson was on a voyage from Sunderland, County Durham to Kronstadt, Russia.
Lord Stanley	United Kingdom	The Mersey Flat sank at Liverpool, Lancashire with the loss of one of the three people on board.
Sophia and Isabella	United Kingdom	The ship ran aground on the Brake Sand. She was on a voyage from Hartlepool, County Durham to Kingstown, County Dublin. She was refloated and resumed her voyage.
Ville Dontrain	France	The ship ran aground on the Brake Sand. She was on a voyage from Methil, Fife, United Kingdom to Pontorson, Manche. She was refloated and resumed her voyage.
Vanilla	United Kingdom	The ship departed from Annotto Bay, Jamaica for London. No further trace, presumed foundered with the loss of all hands.
Unnamed	United Kingdom	The schooner sank off Margate, Kent.

== 11 August ==
List of shipwrecks: 11 August 1869
Ship	State	Description
Adele	Flag unknown	The steamship was wrecked in the Tromper Wiek. She was on a voyage from Stettin to Hamburg.
Bessie	United Kingdom	The ship sprang a leak and foundered in the North Sea off Egmond aan Zee, North Holland, Netherlands. Her crew were rescuedShe was on a voyage from Sunderland, County Durham to the Nieuw Diep.
Edward	United Kingdom	The tug suffered a boiler explosion and sank in the River Thames at Custom House, Middlesex with the loss of both crew and a Dutch sailor on board the steamship Hollandia (Netherlands), which was struck by flying débris.
Ganges	United Kingdom	The ship was holed by her anchor and sank at the bows at Liverpool, Lancashire.
Gem	United Kingdom	The ship ran aground and was wrecked at Lagos, Portugal. She was on a voyage from Liverpool to Lagos.
Hamilla Mitchell	United Kingdom	The ship was wrecked on the Leuconna Hammocks, at the mouth of the Yangtze-kiang. She was on a voyage from London to Shanghai, China.
M. A. Star	(Canada)	The steamship was driven ashore and wrecked at Cape Ledge, Nova Scotia. She was on a voyage from Saint John, New Brunswick to Halifax, Nova Scotia.
Recompense	United Kingdom	The brigantine sprang a leak and foundered off Tenby, Pembrokeshire. Her eight crew survived. She was on a voyage from Cardiff, Glamorgan to Southampton, Hampshire. She was refloated on 22 August and taken in to Tenby.
Werthin	United Kingdom	The brig collided with the steamship John Bowes (United Kingdom) and sank in the North Sea. Her crew were rescued by John Bowes. Werthin was on a voyage from Hartlepool, County Durham to London.

== 12 August ==
List of shipwrecks: 12 August 1869
Ship	State	Description
Brilliant	United Kingdom	The ship was driven ashore at Zandvoort, North Holland, Netherlands. Her crew were rescued. She was on a voyage from the Nieuw Diep to Sunderland, County Durham.
Brothers	United Kingdom	The sloop collided with the steamship St. Clair (United Kingdom) and sank. Both crew were rescued by St. Clair.

== 13 August ==
List of shipwrecks: 13 August 1869
Ship	State	Description
Aurelie	France	The ship sank near Paimbœuf, Loire-Inférieure.
Bellerophon	Flag unknown	The barque was driven ashore at "Rammekensdyk", Zeeland, Netherlands.
Claudius	Hamburg	The ship departed from Pará, Brazil for Hamburg. No further trace, presumed foundered with the loss of all hands.
Emanuel Bouther	United Kingdom	The ship was driven ashore on the Dutch coast. She was on a voyage from Newcastle upon Tyne, Northumberland to Rotterdam, South Holland, Netherlands. She was refloated and taken in to Hellevoetsluis, Zeeland.
Hannah Lizzie	United Kingdom	The ship ran aground on the North Breakers, off Galveston, Texas, United States and was wrecked. She was on a voyage from Liverpool, Lancashire to Galveston.
Jules Marie	Belgium	The ship foundered. She was on a voyage from Antwerp to Riga, Russia.
Rita	United Kingdom	The steamship was destroyed by fire off Navarino, Greece.
Unnamed	Spain	The ship foundered 50 nautical miles (93 km) east of Réunion with the loss of four of her 33 crew. Survivors were rescued by a British ship.

== 14 August ==
List of shipwrecks: 14 August 1869
Ship	State	Description
Arrow	United Kingdom	The ship ran aground on the Ouze Edge Sand, in the Thames Estuary. .
Atlas	United Kingdom	The steamship ran aground in the Firth of Tay off Invergowrie, Perthshire. She was on a voyage from Newburgh, Fife to Dundee, Forfarshire. She was refloated the next day and completed her voyage.
Bazaar, and Sandusky	United States	Bazaar collided with Sandusky in the Irish Sea off the Tuskar Rock. She was on a voyage from Liverpool, Lancashire, United Kingdom to Philadelphia, Pennsylvania. She put in to Milford Haven, Pembrokeshire, United Kingdom in a severely damaged condition. Sandusky was on a voyage from Liverpool to Philadelphia. She was towed back to Liverpool in a sinking condition.
Cumberland	United States	The steamboat was destroyed by a boiler explosion on the Ohio River with the loss of twenty lives.
Herstelling	United Kingdom	The ship was sighted off the coast of Florida, United States whilst on a voyage from "Chiltepec" to an English port. No further trace, presumed foundered with the loss of all hands.
Janna Meyer	Netherlands	The ship was run down and sunk in the North Sea. Her crew were rescued by European (United Kingdom). Jana Meyer was on a voyage from Newcastle upon Tyne, Northumberland, United Kingdom to Harlingen, Friesland.
Tvendre Brodre	Flag unknown	The ship foundered in the Dogger Bank.

== 15 August ==
List of shipwrecks: 15 August 1869
Ship	State	Description
Oleg	Imperial Russian Navy	The frigate was rammed and sunk in the Gulf of Finland off Hogland by the ironclad Kreml (Imperial Russian Navy) with the loss of sixteen of her 445 crew. Survivors were rescued by Kreml, Pervenets, Petropavlovsk and Vityaz (all Imperial Russian Navy).
Sandusky	United States)	The ship collided with Bazaar (United Kingdom) off the Tuskar Rock. She was on a voyage from New York, United States to Liverpool, Lancashire, United Kingdom. She was towed in to Liverpool in a sinking condition.

== 16 August ==
List of shipwrecks: 16 August 1869
Ship	State	Description
Alert	United Kingdom	The ship sprang a leak and was beached at "Kilgea Kin". She was on a voyage from Liverpool, Lancashire to Harburg.
Jupiter	United Kingdom	The ship was driven ashore in the Somme.
Margaret	United Kingdom	The barque was wrecked on the Bird Rocks. Her crew were rescued by the schooner Annie Laurie ( Canada). Margaret was on a voyage from Quebec City, Canada to Liverpool, Lancashire. The wreck was plundered and burnt by the local inhabitants.
Triumph	United Kingdom	The ship ran aground on the Bringyattee Rocks, off Alderney, Channel Islands. She broke in two on 21 August.
Tuscan	United Kingdom	The brig was wrecked on "Plantine Island".
Witham	United Kingdom	The sloop foundered in the North Sea 25 nautical miles (46 km) off Aberdeen. Her crew were rescued by a Dutch fishing lugger. She was on a voyage from Thurso, Caithness to Perth.

== 17 August ==
List of shipwrecks: 17 August 1869
Ship	State	Description
Emile	France	The ship foundered off the Salvages with the loss of two of her crew.
Flying Scud	(United Kingdom of Great Britain and Ireland) Cape Colony	The steamship departed from Yokohama for Hiogo, Japan. No further trace, presumed foundered with the loss of all hands.

== 18 August ==
List of shipwrecks: 18 August 1869
Ship	State	Description
Helen	United Kingdom	The schooner was driven ashore at Peterhead, Aberdeenshire. She was on a voyage from London to Wick, Caithness.
Siren	United Kingdom	The ship was wrecked near Maldonado, Uruguay. Her crew survived.

== 19 August ==
List of shipwrecks: 19 August 1869
Ship	State	Description
Margaret	United Kingdom	The ship was wrecked on the Bird Rocks, in the Gulf of Saint Lawrence. She was on a voyage from Quebec City, Canada to Liverpool, Lancashire.
Mary Martha	United Kingdom	The brig capsized and sank in the Mediterranean Sea 300 nautical miles (560 km) west of Malta with the loss of six of her nine crew. Survivors were rescued by the barque Theresa (Flag unknown). Mary Martha was on a voyage from Brăila, Ottoman Empire to Falmouth, Cornwall or Queenstown, County Cork.

== 20 August ==
List of shipwrecks: 20 August 1869
Ship	State	Description
Aurora Australis	United Kingdom	The ship was wrecked at Yokohama, Japan.
Bezaleel	United Kingdom	The schooner was severely damaged in a typhoon at Yokohama.
Flying Scud	United States	The steamship was driven ashore in the Kiogo Channel. She was on a voyage from Yokohama to Hiogo, Japan.
Hesperia	United Kingdom	The ship collided with the steamship Northumberland (United Kingdom) and sank in the River Thames at Gravesend, Kent. Her crew were rescued by Northumberland. Hesperia was on a voyage from London to Singapore, Straits Settlements. She was refloated on 3 September.
Powhattan	United States	The ship was wrecked at Yokohama.
Robin Hood	United States	The extreme clipper was destroyed by fire at Baker's Island.

== 21 August ==
List of shipwrecks: 21 August 1869
Ship	State	Description
Two Brothers	United Kingdom	The schooner ran aground on the Nore.

== 23 August ==
List of shipwrecks: 23 August 1869
Ship	State	Description
Beatrice	United Kingdom	The ship sank at Galway. She was on a voyage from Swansea, Glamorgan to Galway. She was refloated on 18 January 1870 and taken in to Galway.
Chili	United Kingdom	The ship was abandoned in the Atlantic Ocean. Her crew were rescued by Suisko (Flag unknown). Chili was on a voyage from the Clyde to Shanghai, China.
Clara	United Kingdom	The ship collided with the steamship Kaikoura (United Kingdom) and sank in the River Thames. Clara was on a voyage from Arkhangelsk, Russia to London. She was refloated on 31 August and taken in to London.
Modesty	United Kingdom	The full-rigged ship collided with the steamship Sirrio (Italy) and sank in the Irish Sea 18 nautical miles (33 km) south east of the Codling Sandbank. Her crew were rescued by Sirrio. Modesty was on a voyage from Glasgow, Renfrewshire to Bombay, India.

== 24 August ==
List of shipwrecks: 24 August 1869
Ship	State	Description
Romp	United Kingdom	The brig was driven ashore at Kettleness, Yorkshire. She was refloated and taken in tow for Hartlepool, County Durham.

== 25 August ==
List of shipwrecks: 25 August 1869
Ship	State	Description
Ceres	United Kingdom	The ship foundered with the loss of all hands, according to a message in a bottle that washed up at Fleetwood, Lancashire in late September.
Methusaleh	United Kingdom	The ship foundered in the North Sea with the loss of all hands, according to a message in a bottle washed up at Wyk auf Föhr, Prussia in mid-October.
Windsor	United Kingdom	The steamship ran aground off Howth, County Dublin. Female passengers were taken off. She was on a voyage from Dublin to Liverpool, Lancashire. She was refloated.

== 26 August ==
List of shipwrecks: 26 August 1869
Ship	State	Description
Anna Maria	United Kingdom	The ship foundered in the Atlantic Ocean. Four of the eleven people on board were reported missing; the rest were rescued by the steamship Quapore (Brazil). Anna Maria was on a voyage from the Clyde to Valparaíso, Chile.
Catharine	Prussia	The ship foundered in the North Sea. Her crew were rescued.
Fury	New South Wales	The ship was wrecked in the Bass Strait. She was on a voyage from Sydney to Melbourne, Victoria.
Prince Regent	United Kingdom	The ship was wrecked on the coast of Queensland.
Tynemouth	United Kingdom	The barque was wrecked on a reef off Raine Island, Queensland. Her crew took to a boat, and were rescued on 30 November by the schooner Georgina ( (United Kingdom of Great Britain and Ireland) Queensland. Tynemouth was on a voyage from North Shields, Northumberland to Australia.

== 27 August ==
List of shipwrecks: 27 August 1869
Ship	State	Description
Catharina	Prussia	The ship foundered in the North Sea. Her crew survived.
Dunreagan Castle	United Kingdom	The steamship ran aground off Islay, Inner Hebrides.
Tasmania	(United Kingdom of Great Britain and Ireland) Tasmania	The ship struck a reef in the Caramata Passage. She was on a voyage from Newcastle, New South Wales to Batavia, Netherlands East Indies. She put in to Singapore, Straits Settlements for repairs.

== 28 August ==
List of shipwrecks: 28 August 1869
Ship	State	Description
Commodore Perry	United Kingdom	The ship arrived at Calcutta, British Raj on fire and was scuttled. She was on a voyage from the River Tyne to Calcutta.
Susan N. Smart, or Susan N. Smith	United States	The whaler, a schooner, capsized in the Atlantic Ocean with the loss of 22 of the 27 people on board. Survivors were rescued by Flatworth (United Kingdom). The whaler was on a voyage from "Derwinique" to Boston, Massachusetts.

== 29 August ==
List of shipwrecks: 29 August 1869
Ship	State	Description
Alexander	United Kingdom	The schooner ran aground and sank at Rhoscolyn, Anglesey. Her crew survived. She was on a voyage from Cardiff, Glamorgan to Sligo.
Annie Longton	United Kingdom	The ship was wrecked on the Goodwin Sands, Kent with the loss of all sixteen crew. She was on a voyage from Newcastle upon Tyne, Northumberland to Africa.
Aurora	Flag unknown	The galiot foundered in the North Sea.
Dispatch	United Kingdom	The brig was sighted off the Calf of Man, Isle of Man whilst on a voyage from Garston, Lancashire to Belfast, County Antrim. Presumed foundered in the Irish Sea with the loss of all hands; a boat containing two pigs came ashore at Balbriggan, County Dublin on 1 September.
Eaglet	United Kingdom	The smack was driven ashore and damaged at Porthdinllaen, Caernarfonshire.
Fawn	United Kingdom	The fishing lugger was run down and sunk off Dover, Kent by the brig San Juan (United Kingdom). Her eight crew survived, some reached land in their boat, others were rescued by San Juan.
Henry	United Kingdom	The ship foundered off Barnstaple Devon. Her crew were rescued. She was on a voyage from Pembrey, Pembrokeshire to Barnstaple.
Jane and Mary	United Kingdom	The sloop was driven ashore and wrecked at Rhyl, Denbighshire.
John Forde	United Kingdom	The yacht foundered off the Kent coast. Her crew survived.
Venture	United Kingdom	The schooner was driven ashore and wrecked at Courtmacsherry, County Cork. She was on a voyage from Liverpool, Lancashire to Courtown, County Wexford.
Wave	United Kingdom	The brigantine was driven ashore at Courtmacsherry. Her crew were rescued.

== 30 August ==
List of shipwrecks: 30 August 1869
Ship	State	Description
Moratin	Spain	The steamship ran aground at the mouth of the Guadalquivir.
Pampero	United Kingdom	The ship departed from Newcastle, New South Wales for Shanghai, China. No further trace, presumed foundered with the loss of all hands.
Rose	United Kingdom	The ship ran aground in the River Orwell. She was on a voyage from Middlesbrough, Yorkshire to Ghent, East Flanders, Belgium. She was refloated and taken in to Ipswich, Suffolk.
Vivid	United Kingdom	The ship collided with the steamship Clifton (United Kingdom) and sank in the North Sea 40 nautical miles (74 km) off the coast of Jutland. Her crew were rescued.

== 31 August ==
List of shipwrecks: 31 August 1869
Ship	State	Description
Garibaldi	United Kingdom	The schooner ran aground on the East Knock Sand, in the Thames Estuary. She was refloated the next day and resumed her voyage.
Harlech Castle	United Kingdom	The ship struck a uncharted rock and was wrecked at Piedras Blancas, California, United States with the loss of two of her crew. She was on a voyage from San Francisco, California to Iquique, Chile.
Oxus	United Kingdom	The barque struck the Seven Stones Reef, Cornwall and foundered. Her fourteen crew were rescued. She was on a voyage from Akyab, burma to London.
Plantagenet	United Kingdom	The steamship was sighted off Malta. She was on a voyage from Brăila, Ottoman Empire to a British port. No further trace, presumed foundered with the loss of all hands.
Talbot	United Kingdom	The barque struck a sunken rock and was wrecked at Copiapó Point, Chile. Her crew were rescued by the steamship Concepción (Chile). Talbot was on a voyage from Iquique to Valparaíso, or from Valparaíso to Caldera, Chile.

== Unknown date ==
List of shipwrecks: Unknown date in August 1869
Ship	State	Description
Albion	(United Kingdom of Great Britain and Ireland) Isle of Man	The fishing boat capsized at Fleetwood, Lancashire and was severely damaged. Her crew survived.
Ann Eliza	United Kingdom	The ship was driven ashore at Cape Charles, Virginia, United States. She was on a voyage from Liverpool, Lancashire to Baltimore, Maryland, United States. Three people were killed by an explosion during salvage efforts.
Benin	United Kingdom	The steamship ran aground on the Balein Bank, off the coast of Africa.
Bessie Young	United Kingdom	The barque was driven ashore on St. Catherines Island, Georgia, United States. She was on a voyage from Liverpool to Savannah, Georgia. She was refloated on 3 August.
Constance	United Kingdom	The ship was driven ashore and wrecked in Trepassey Bay. She was on a voyage from Cárdenas, Cuba to Greenock, Renfrewshire.
Eleanor	France	The barque was wrecked near the mouth of the Rio Grande do Norte.
Empress	United Kingdom	The ship was wrecked east of Great Matuna, India. Her crew were rescued. She was on a voyage from Saigon, French Indochina to London.
Fung Shung	United States	The schooner was lost at Amoy, China.
Ganges	United Kingdom	The ship was driven ashore at "Nepore". She was refloated on 18 August and resumed her voyage.
Ido	Flag unknown	The schooner was wrecked near the mouth of the Rio Grande do Sul.
Inez, or Juelz	United States	The ship was wrecked at New York. She was on a voyage from New York to Swansea, Glamorgan, United Kingdom.
La Plata	United Kingdom	The steamship was driven ashore in the Dardanelles near Sestos, Ottoman Empire. She was on a voyage from London to Constantinople, Ottoman Empire.
Lightning	United Kingdom	The ship was destroyed by fire at Geelong, Victoria after 28 August. She was on a voyage from Melbourne, Victoria to Geelong and London.
Louise Marie	Norway	The ship collided with the brig Victoria (United Kingdom) and was abandoned. Her crew were rescued. Louise Marie was on a voyage from Korsør, Denmark to Skien. She was taken in to Gothenburg, Sweden in a derelict condition.
Napier	United States	The ship was driven ashore in a typhoon at Yokohama, Japan.
Neptune	United Kingdom	The ship was driven ashore on Rodrigues. She was on a voyage from Singapore, Straits Settlements to Mauritius.
Richmond	United Kingdom	The ship was wrecked in the Rio Grande do Norte. She was on a voyage from Buenos Aires, Argentin to Cork.
Sophie Marie	United Kingdom	The ship was lost near "Pedro Blanco". She was on a voyage from Hong Kong to Yokohama, Japan.
