= List of shipwrecks in June 1885 =

The list of shipwrecks in June 1885 includes ships sunk, foundered, grounded, or otherwise lost during June 1885.

== 1 June ==
List of shipwrecks: 1 June 1885
Ship	State	Description
B. D. Hasking	United States	The fishing schooner was wrecked about 2 nautical miles (3.7 km) south of the Nauset Lighthouse, Massachusetts. Her crew were rescued.
Newsboy	United States	The fishing schooner struck a hidden ledge and sank off the Isle of Shoals, Maine/New Hampshire. Her crew escaped in their dories.

== 2 June ==
List of shipwrecks: 2 June 1885
Ship	State	Description
SMS Augusta	Imperial German Navy	The Augusta-class corvette sank in the Gulf of Aden with the loss of all 222 crew.
Carl	Flag unknown	The ship foundered in the North Sea (60°43′N 6°03′W). Her nine crew were rescued by Henrietta Schlussen (Flag unknown).
Ellisland	United Kingdom	The full-rigged ship caught fire at sea. She was on a voyage from Calcutta, India to Dundee, Forfarshire. The fire was extinguished.

== 3 June ==
List of shipwrecks: 3 June 1885
Ship	State	Description
Carlton Tower	United Kingdom	The steamship was driven ashore at "Dankali" or "Dunkati". She was refloated on 5 June and taken in to Perim, Aden Settlement.
Emily	United Kingdom	The schooner ran aground off Hartland Point and was beached at Northam, Devon. She was refloated the next day with the assistance of a tug and put in to Appledore, Devon.
Futut Barri	Ottoman Empire	The ship foundered in a cyclone off Cape Guardafui, Majeerteen Sultanate. Her crew were rescued by the steamship Diomed (Flag unknown).
Naples, and Ruperra	United Kingdom	The steamships collided at Aden, Aden Settlement in a cyclone and were both severely damaged.
Renard	French Navy	The sloop-of-war foundered in a cyclone off Aden with the loss of all hands.
Seraglio	United Kingdom	The steamship foundered at sea 400 nautical miles (740 km) off Bombay, India in a cyclone. Her crew survived. She was on a voyage from Cardiff to Bombay.
Speke Hall	United Kingdom	The steamship sank during a cyclone in the Gulf of Aden with the loss of 34 of her 35 crew. The survivor was rescued by the steamship Peiho (France). Speke Hall was on a voyage from Cardiff to Bombay.
Unnamed	Flag unknown	The Arab vessel foundered off Perim. Four crew were rescued by the steamship Balcarres Brook (United Kingdom).

== 4 June ==
List of shipwrecks: 4 June 1885
Ship	State	Description
Abermaid	United Kingdom	The steamship was driven ashore at Pori, Grand Duchy of Finland. She was refloated on 9 June.
Condor	United Kingdom	The barge was run into by the steamship Carron (United Kingdom) and sank at Greenwich, Kent.
Heimdal	Norway	The steamship was damaged by the explosion of the boiler of her donkey engine at Antwerp, Belgium. A crew member was killed and several were severely wounded.
Vectis	United Kingdom	The schooner ran aground at Teignmouth, Devon. She was on a voyage from Newcastle upon Tyne, Northumberland to Teignmouth.

== 5 June ==
List of shipwrecks: 5 June 1885
Ship	State	Description
John and Robert	United Kingdom	The smack was driven ashore and wrecked 6 nautical miles (11 km) south of Campbeltown, Argyllshire.
Reindeer	United Kingdom	The steamship was wrecked on Ouessant, Finistère, France. She was on a voyage from Narva, Russia to Hamburg, Germany.

== 7 June ==
List of shipwrecks: 7 June 1885
Ship	State	Description
Clarissa B. Carver, and Glamorganshire	United States; United Kingdom	The full-rigged ship Clarissa B. Carver collided with the steamship Glamorganshire and sank at Hiogo, Japan. Glamorganshire was beached.

== 8 June ==
List of shipwrecks: 8 June 1885
Ship	State	Description
Earl of Lonsdale	United Kingdom	The ship was wrecked in Smith Sound, Isles of Scilly. She was on a voyage from Alexandria, Egypt, to Portishead, Somerset. The master had thought his ship was to the west of, and 10 nautical miles (19 km) south of, the Bishop Rock, Isles of Scilly.
Kate	United Kingdom	The schooner was wrecked in Galway Bay. Her crew were rescued. She was on a voyage from Runcorn, Cheshire to Galway.

== 10 June ==
List of shipwrecks: 10 June 1885
Ship	State	Description
Cahois	New South Wales	The steamship was wrecked on Evan's Rock, at the mouth of the Richmond River. All on board were rescued. She was on a voyage from Sydney to Brisbane, Queensland.
Charles Northcote	Sweden	The barque was abandoned in the Atlantic Ocean. Her eleven crew were rescued by the steamship Neckar (Germany). Charles Northcote was on a voyage from Pascagoula, Mississippi, United States to Queenstown, County Cork, United Kingdom.
Kreml	Imperial Russian Navy	The Pervenets-class ironclad sank in Kunda Bay. She was refloated on 15 June and taken in to Kronstadt, where she was repaired and returned to service.

== 11 June ==
List of shipwrecks: 11 June 1885
Ship	State	Description
Montana	United States	The barque was wrecked in the Nushagak River in the District of Alaska due to an error by her pilot. All 97 people on board survived.

== 12 June ==
List of shipwrecks: 12 June 1885
Ship	State	Description
Brigötte	Norway	The barque was abandoned at sea. Her crew were rescued by the steamship Polynesian (United Kingdom).
Josefina	Sweden	The brig was wrecked at Barranquilla, Venezuela. Her crew were rescued. She was on a voyage from Barranquilla to Liverpool, Lancashire, United Kingdom.

== 19 June ==
List of shipwrecks: 19 June 1885
Ship	State	Description
Agile	United Kingdom	The schooner ran aground on the Cross Sands, in the North Sea off the coast of Norfolk, and sank. Her crew were rescued. She was on a voyage from London to Hull, Yorkshire.
Italia	Italy	The steamship struck a rock and sank near "Lomas, Peru" with the loss of 65 of the 134 people on board. She was on a voyage from Callao, Peru to the River Plate.

== 20 June ==
List of shipwrecks: 20 June 1885
Ship	State	Description
Dona Clara	Brazil	The barque was wrecked at Pará.
Finola	United Kingdom	The yacht was driven ashore in Carnarvon Bay. She was refloated and put in to Holyhead, Anglesey.
Ragnar	Sweden	The barque was wrecked in the Sangir Strait. Her crew were rescued.
Unnamed	Flag unknown	The brigantine was driven ashore at Hartland Point, Devon, United Kingdom.

== 21 June ==
List of shipwrecks: 21 June 1885
Ship	State	Description
Alberta	United Kingdom	The schooner was run into by the steamship Newcastle City (United Kingdom) and sank at Charlton, Kent.
Radnorshire	United Kingdom	The steamship ran aground on the Sorelle Rocks, 60 nautical miles (110 km) off Malta and was wrecked. Her crew took to the boats; they were rescued by the steamship Carn Brea (United Kingdom). Radnorshire was on a voyage from Hamburg, Germany to Shanghai, China and Yokohama, Japan.
Willingale	United Kingdom	The steamship was driven ashore and wrecked at Cape Guardafui, Majerteen Sultanate with the loss of twelve of her sixteen crew. She was on a voyage from Madras, India to Boston, Massachusetts, United States.

== 23 June ==
List of shipwrecks: 23 June 1885
Ship	State	Description
County of Cardigan	United Kingdom	The full-rigged ship ran aground at Cardiff, Glamorgan avoiding a collision with the barque Nueva Buenaventura (Spain) and was severely damagedc.
Pilgrim	United Kingdom	The brigantine was run into by the steamship Norfolk (United Kingdom) and sank in the River Thames at Woolwich, Kent. Her crew survived.

== 24 June ==
List of shipwrecks: 24 June 1885
Ship	State	Description
Bertie	United Kingdom	The Mersey Flat collided with Minnie Burrell ( Canada) and sank in the River Mersey. Her crew were rescued. She was refloated and taken in to Tranmere, Cheshire.
City of Tokio	United States	The steamship was wrecked near the Sagama Lighthouse, 22 nautical miles (41 km) from Yokohama, Japan. She was on a voyage from San Francisco, California to Yokohama. She broke up in a typhoon a week later.
Guide	United Kingdom	The tug suffered a boiler explosion in the River Tyne.

== 25 June ==
List of shipwrecks: 25 June 1885
Ship	State	Description
Alert, and Conqueror	United Kingdom	The barquentine Conqueror collided with Alert and both vessels sank in the Firth of Clyde 8 nautical miles (15 km) north north west of Sanda Island with the loss of a crew member. Conqueror was on a voyage from Ardrossan, Ayrshire to Dublin. Alert was on a voyage from Belfast, County Antrim to Ayr. Survivors from both vessels were rescued by the steamship Seal (United Kingdom).

== 27 June ==
List of shipwrecks: 27 June 1885
Ship	State	Description
Colina	United Kingdom	The steamship was driven ashore at the south point of Rathlin Island, County Antrim. She was on a voyage from Glasgow, Renfrewshire to Montreal, Quebec, Canada. She was refloated on 8 July.

== 30 June ==
List of shipwrecks: 30 June 1885
Ship	State	Description
Alphonso	Norway	The barque collided with a barge and sank in the River Tweed. She was on a voyage from Kotka, Grand Duchy of Finland to Berwick upon Tweed, Northumberland, United Kingdom.

== Unknown date ==
List of shipwrecks: Unknown date in June 1885
Ship	State	Description
Aghios Georgios	Greece	The brig ran aground on the Donganastan Shoal, in the Sea of Marmara. She was on a voyage from Marseille, Bouches-du-Rhône, France to Constantinople, Ottoman Empire.
Bee	(United Kingdom of Great Britain and Ireland) Guernsey	The schooner was driven ashore in Kimmeridge Bay.
Border Maid	United Kingdom	The ship was driven ashore and wrecked at Rhoscolyn, Anglesey.
Cambrian Princess	United Kingdom	The ship was driven ashore in the Spencer Gulf. She was on a voyage from Barrow-in-Furness, Lancashire to Port Augusta, South Australia.
Ceres	Germany	The galiot sank in the Great Belt with the loss of all hands.
Deux Frères	United Kingdom	The ship was lost off Appledore, Devon, United Kingdom. Her crew were rescued by a skiff.
Emily Raymond	Canada	The ship was abandoned in the Atlantic Ocean. Her crew were rescued by Frithjof (Norway).
Empirico	Austria-Hungary	The barque was wrecked at "Sinon", Africa. Her crew were rescued.
Eu	Norway	The ship was wrecked at Kinlochbervie, Sutherland, United Kingdom.
Frithjof	Norway	The ship was driven ashore at Cape Ballard, Newfoundland Colony and was a total loss.
Guyandotte	Flag unknown	The ship sank at New York, United States.
Haabi	Kingdom of Samoa	The schooner was wrecked off Treasury Island, Solomon Islands.
H. J. Libby	United States	The ship ran aground on the Romer Shoal and was severely damaged. She was on a voyage from Manila, Spanish East Indies to New York. She was refloated.
Hotspur	United Kingdom	The brig was driven ashore at "Seituak". She was refloated and taken in to Boston, Massachusetts, United States in a leaky condition.
Lake Manitoba	United Kingdom	The steamship was wrecked on the coast of the Newfoundland Colony. All 60 people on board were rescued.
Mars	United Kingdom	The barque was driven ashore and wrecked in West Bay with the loss of four of her crew. She was on a voyage from Melbourne, Victoria to Port Pirie, South Australia.
Norway	Flag unknown	The steamship was driven ashore. She was later refloated and taken in to Raahe, Grand Duchy of Finland.
Oberon	United Kingdom	The ship was driven ashore and wrecked. Her crew were rescued. She was on a voyage from Cardiff to Saigon, French Indo-China.
Rossini	Germany	The barque was driven ashore on Prinsen Island, Netherlands East Indies. She was on a voyage from Cardiff, Glamorgan, United Kingdom to Hong Kong.
Rudolf	Norway	The barque was driven ashore at "Klentchamn", Gotland, Sweden.
Sarah Pringle	United Kingdom	The schooner collided with Hermanite (United Kingdom) and sank in the River Lee. Sarah Pringle was on a voyage from Bangor to Cork. The wreck was removed, being an obstruction to navigation.
Shotton	United Kingdom	The steamship ran aground at Refsnæs, Denmark. She was on a voyage from Hartlepool, County Durham to Flensburg, Germany.
Slieve More	United Kingdom	The full-rigged ship was destroyed by fire in the Indian Ocean.
Stella	Netherlands	The brigantine was driven ashore and wrecked at Natal, Brazil. She was on a voyage from Macau to Portalegre, Brazil.
Sultana, and Ville d'Anvers	United Kingdom; France	The schooner Sultana collided with the steamship Ville d'Anvers and sank off Havre de Grâce, Seine-Inférieure, France. Ville d'Anvers was severely damaged.
Undine	Germany	The schooner was driven ashore at "Sorkholm".
Valhalla	Norway	The barque was driven ashore on Saltholmen, Denmark. She was on a voyage from Kotka, Grand Duchy of Finland to Grangemouth, Stirlingshire, United Kingdom. She was refloated and resumed her voyage.
Western Belle	United States	The ship was abandoned in the Pacific Ocean. Her crew were rescued by Brodrick Castle (United Kingdom). Western Belle was on a voyage from Sydney, New South Wales to Wilmington, Delaware.
William Hall	United Kingdom	The ship was beached at the Mumbles, Glamorgan.
Unnamed	United Kingdom	The steamship ran aground on Saltholm, Denmark.
Unnamed	Germany	The lighter sprang a leak and was beached between Bremen and Vegesack.
