= Russian ship Ne Tron Menia =

List of ships with the same or similar names

At least six ships of the Imperial Russian Navy have been named Ne Tron Menia (Russian: Не тронь меня—"Touch me not").

- Russian ship of the line Ne Tron Menia (1725)—Sankt Mikhail-class ship of the line that was broken up after 1739.
- Russian ship of the line Ne Tron Menia (1763)—Slava Rossii-class ship of the line that was sold for scrap in 1875.
- Russian ship of the line Ne Tron Menia (1780)—Aziia-class ship of the line that was broken up after 1803.
- Russian ship of the line Ne Tron Menia (1809)—Selafail-class ship of the line that was broken up in 1828.
- Russian ship of the line Ne Tron Menia (1832)—Imperatritsa Aleksandra-class ship of the line that was stricken in 1863.
- Russian ironclad Ne Tron Menia (1864)—Pervenets-class ironclad that was scrapped in 1905.
