= Vladimir Miklukha =

Russian captain (1853–1905)

- Владимир Миклуха (Russian); Володимир Миклуха (Ukrainian)
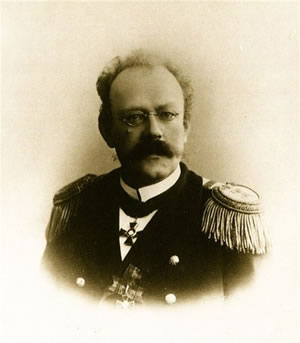
- Born: May 31, 1853; Chernigov Governorate, Russian Empire
- Died: May 28, 1905 (aged 51); Straits of Tsushima
- Alma mater: Naval Cadet Corps
- Relatives: Nicholas Miklouho-Maclay (brother)
- Military career
- Allegiance: Russia
- Branch: Imperial Russian Navy
- Service years: 1868–1905
- Rank: Captain 1st rank
- Commands: Admiral Ushakov
- Conflicts: Russo-Turkish War; Russo-Japanese War; Battle of Tsushima †

Vladimir Nikolaevich Miklukha (Russian: Владимир Николаевич Миклуха; also Volodymyr Mykolaiovych Myklukha, Ukrainian: Володимир Миколайович Миклуха; May 31, 1853 – May 28, 1905) was a Russo-Ukrainian Captain 1st Rank and war hero of the Russo-Japanese War. He was known for commanding the Admiral Ushakov during the Battle of Tsushima and chose to go down with the ship.

== Origin and Surname ==
In all documents, Vladimir Nikolaevich had the surname "Miklukha". In the service records, award documents, lifetime reference books (for example, "All Petersburg"), his surname is "Miklukha". Even on a memorial plaque in the Church of Christ the Savior (Temple-Memorial to those killed in the Battle of Tsushima), he was known as "Miklukha". The surname "Miklukho-Maklay" began to be attributed to him after his death, by analogy with his older brother, Nicholas Miklouho-Maclay, whose second part of the surname appeared after traveling to Australia. His ancestors were of the Ukrainian nobility hailing from the Chernigov Governorate. Regarding its origin, Miklouho-Maclay, the elder brother of Vladimir Nikolaevich, made notes on the margins of the manuscript of an essay about his life and travels, which was presented to him for review by E. S. Thomassen:

My ancestors came originally from the Ukraine, and were Zaporogg-cossacks of the Dnieper. After the annexation of the Ukraine, Stepan, one of the family, served as sotnik (a superior Cossack officer) under General Count Pyotr Rumyantsev, and having distinguished himself at the storming of the Turkish fortress of Otshakoff, was by ukase of Catherine II created a noble.

== Early Career and Narodnaya Volya ==
Miklukha enrolled as a student in the Naval Cadet Corps on September 18, 1868, graduated as a Gardes de la Marine on April 16, 1872, and initially assigned to the 4th Naval Crew on November 9. After being promoted to michman on August 30, 1873, he joined the Naval Organization of the Narodnaya Volya in Kronstadt. In 1874, along with his classmates Nikolai Sukhanov, Fedor Yurkovsky and Pyotr Serebrennikov, distributed literature of the Narodnaya Volya to "go with the people" but after the decline of the party, he left any involvement from the party.

== Military career ==
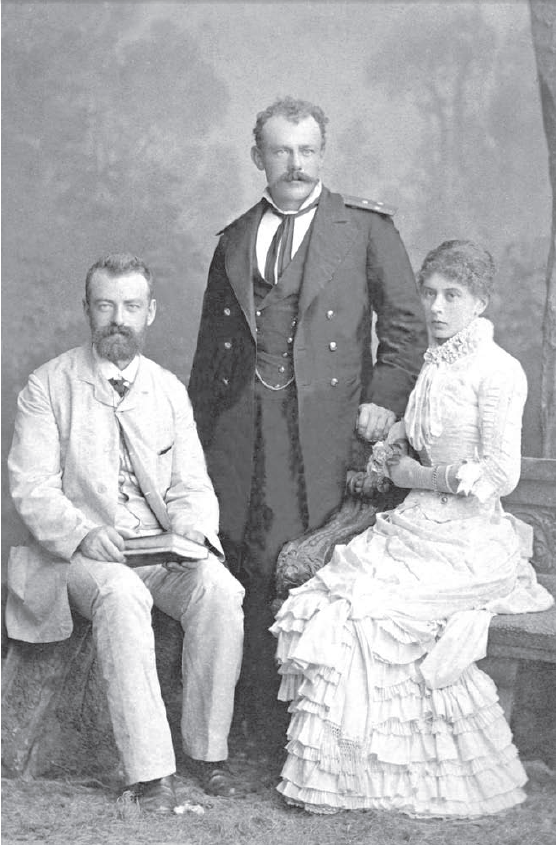
Nikolai (sitting), Vladimir and his first wife Yulia. (1883)

He was assigned to the Hydrographic Department on October 30, 1875, but was later transferred to the 3rd Naval Crew on October 22, 1876, and the 2nd Naval Crew of the Black Sea Fleet on November 20. He then served in the Russo-Turkish War on the auxiliary cruiser Argonaut and while on the ship, he partook in a confrontation with three Turkish ships near the Sulinsky throat of the Danube on July 8, 1877. He was then transferred to the cruiser Vladimir and participated in the supply of the Gudauta–Novorossiysk Line. He was promoted to Lieutenant on January 1, 1878, and despite being discharged with the rank of Lieutenant Commander on February 18, 1880, he returned to service as a Lieutenant again on March 8, 1881.

After being assigned to the 7th Naval Crew on May 12, 1881, he was then assigned to protect commercial ships within the Volunteer Fleet on May 30. Miklukha was briefly placed back in the 7th Naval Crew on March 10, 1888, but was then assigned to the Black Sea Fleet on April 9 and to the 2nd Naval Crew on the fleet 3 days later. He was then given command of the Ekaterina II on May 26, 1889, and the Kiliya on March 26, 1890, and the Dvenadsat Apostolov on October 4, 1890. Miklukha was then promoted to Captain 2nd Rank and enlisted in the 34th Naval Crew on December 30, 1891. Becoming Chairman of the Carriage Court on May 12, 1892. Three days later, he would command the Novgorod until October 21, 1895, as he commanded the Kubanets from October 30, 1895, to September 7, 1897, but while commanding the ship, he lost several fingers on his right hand due to a hunting accident.

He was then promoted to Captain 1st Rank on April 5, 1898, and transferred to the Baltic Fleet on September 4, 1898, and assigned to the 18th Naval Crew seven days later. On December 30, 1899, he was chairman of the selection committee at the crew and artillery shops of the St. Petersburg port and on September 23, 1900, he was made acting commander of the 18th Naval Crew. He was then given command of the Ne Tron Menia from January 1 to December 28, 1901, and while commanding the ironclad, was made acting commander of the 1st Naval Crew on October 9, 1901. From December 6, 1901, to October 11, 1902, he commanded the Pervenets as well as made official commander of the 1st Naval Crew on September 2, 1902. After taking command of the Admiral Ushakov on October 18, 1902, he passed the exams for commanding 1st rank ships due to the Regulations on the naval qualification for officers of the fleet in November 1904.

== Russo-Japanese War ==
During the Battle of Tsushima, the Admiral Ushakov couldn't maintain a sufficiently high speed and on the night of May 27–28, lagged behind the squadron. On May 28, it being intercepted by the Japanese armored cruisers Iwate and Yakumo but refused to surrender and entered into an unequal battle. Due to the heavy wear of the guns, the latter lost their range and accuracy. Having not reached a single hit on the Japanese ships in about 40 minutes of battle, but having received a number of additional damage, by order of Miklukha, the ship was flooded. The commander himself died in the water from blood loss and hypothermia. His exact cause of death remains unknown as one report stated that he was the last crew member to abandon ship as he floated on a life buoy, but already dead as the report claimed his corpse wasn't picked up for lack of space on the dinghy. According to Japanese newspapers however, Miklukha himself refused help and pointed to a sailor who was dying nearby. In total, 7 officers (including Miklukha), 3 conductors and 84 non-commissioned officers and sailors of the ship were killed in the battle.

On the second day of the battle, May 15, 1905, Japanese ships surrounded the Ushakov. By that time, Nebogatov with his entire detachment (five battleships and one cruiser) had already surrendered. The Japanese raised a signal in front of Ushakov: “We propose to surrender. Admiral Nikolai Nebogatov and his team surrendered." Miklukho, having analyzed the beginning of the signal, exclaimed: “Well, then there’s nothing to disassemble! Down with the answer! Open fire!"

== Legacy ==
In November 1910, the former battleship navigator Lieutenant Captain E. A. Maksimov filed a petition to posthumously award Miklukha the Order of St. George, IV Class for his service at Tsushima on May 15 but it was declined. In 1914, one of the newest destroyers of the fleet were named after the heroes of naval battles and one of them was named after Miklukha. He also makes an appearance in the Russian novel Tsushima by Alexey Novikov-Priboy.

== Awards ==
- War with Turkey (1877–78) Commemorative Medal (Bronze)
- Order of Saint Stanislaus, III Class (August 29, 1879)
- Order of Saint Anna, III Class (January 1, 1883)
- Order of Saint Anna, II Class (June 16, 1896)
- Order of Saint Vladimir, IV Class with bow (September 27, 1899) for his service of 25 years

=== Foreign Awards ===
- Germany: Order of the Red Eagle, II Class (August 12, 1902)
