= Russian ship General Admiral =

At least two ships of the Imperial Russian Navy have been named General Admiral after the naval rank of General Admiral, usually that of the commander of the Russian Navy.

- Russian frigate General Admiral - a steam frigate built in the United States launched in 1858
- Russian cruiser General-Admiral - an armored cruiser launched in 1873
