= Russian ironclad Ne Tron Menia =

Russian ironclad

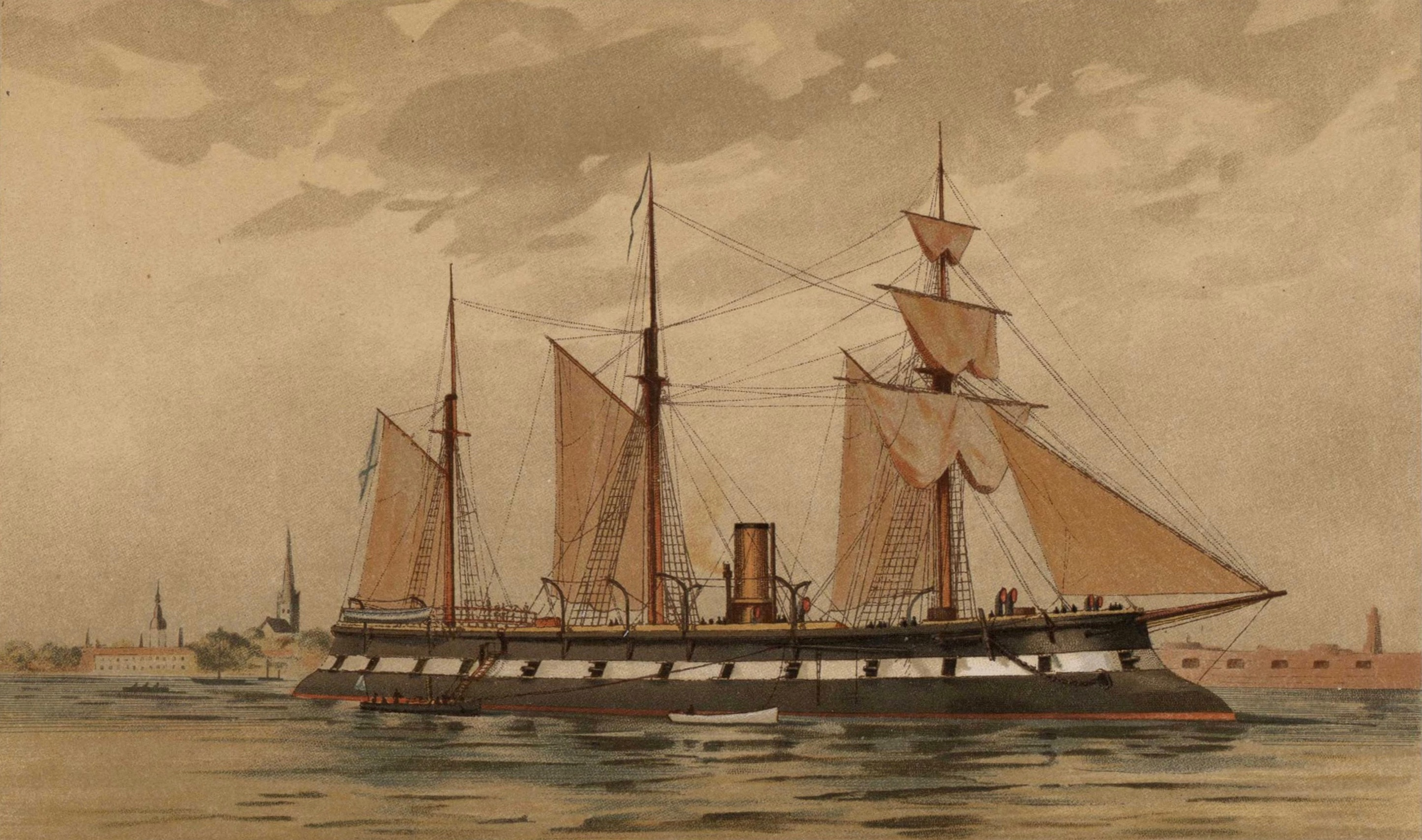

History

Russian Empire
- Name: Ne Tron Menia (Russian: Не тронь меня)
- Operator: Imperial Russian Navy
- Ordered: 31 March 1862
- Builder: Charles Mitchell Shipyard, St. Petersburg
- Cost: 923,500 rubles
- Laid down: 1 December 1863 (Note: All dates used in this article are New Style)
- Launched: 23 June 1864
- Commissioned: 18 July 1865
- Reclassified: Coast defense ironclad, 13 February 1892
- Stricken: 11 October 1905
- Fate: Sold for use as a barge, 8 September 1908

Soviet Union
- Acquired: After Russian Civil War
- Fate: Sold 24 June 1925 to Leningrad Metal Works; Sunk during World War II and raised 1950; Scrapped, 1950s

General characteristics (as completed)
- Class & type: Pervenets-class broadside ironclad
- Displacement: 3,340 long tons (3,390 t)
- Length: 220 ft (67.1 m)
- Beam: 53 ft (16.2 m)
- Draft: 14 ft 6 in (4.4 m)
- Installed power: 1,200 ihp (890 kW)
- Propulsion: 1 shaft; 1 Horizontal direct-action steam engine; 4 rectangular fire-tube boilers
- Speed: 8 knots (15 km/h; 9.2 mph)
- Complement: 459 officers and crewmen
- Armament: 17 × 8-inch (203 mm) rifled guns
- Armor: Belt: 4.5–5.5 in (114–140 mm); Deck: 1 in (25 mm); Conning tower: 4.5 in (114 mm)

The Russian ironclad Ne Tron Menia (Russian: Не тронь меня) was the second of the three Pervenets-class broadside ironclads built for the Imperial Russian Navy during the mid-1860s. She joined the Baltic Fleet upon completion and never left Russian waters. Beginning in 1870 the ship was assigned to the Gunnery Training Detachment and was frequently rearmed. Ne Tron Menia was placed in reserve and hulked a decade later. In 1905 the ship was disarmed and she was sold in 1908. After the end of the Russian Civil War, she was acquired by the Soviets before being sold to a factory in 1925. The ship was sunk in the Siege of Leningrad during World War II and was scrapped after she was salvaged in 1950.

== Design and description ==
The Pervenents-class ironclads were designed as coastal defence ships to protect the approaches to Saint Petersburg and were referred to as "self-propelled armored floating batteries". As such, a heavy armament and protection were the most important factors in their design. Ne Tron Menia means Touch Me Not and refers to the Biblical verse, John 20:17.

Ne Tron Menia was 220 feet (67.1 m) long overall, with a beam of 53 feet (16.2 m) and a designed draft of 14 feet 6 inches (4.4 m). She displaced 3,340 long tons (3,390 t) and her iron hull had a pronounced tumblehome. She was fitted with large rams at bow and stern; the stern ram also serving to protect her rudder and propeller. The ship did not steer well and had "an unpredictable habit of suddenly lurching to one side or another", probably as a result of poor water flow to the rudder. Ne Tron Menia required six men to man her wheel and her total crew numbered 459 officers and enlisted men.

She received the refurbished engine from the steam ship of the line Konstantin as a cost-cutting measure, originally intended for her sister Pervenets. This was probably a direct-acting steam engine and was built by the British firm of Humphrys & Tennant. Steam was provided by four rectangular fire-tube boilers. During sea trials on 18 July 1865, the engine produced a total of 1,200 indicated horsepower (890 kW) and gave the ship a maximum speed of 7.75–8 knots (14.35–14.82 km/h; 8.92–9.21 mph). She carried a maximum of 500 long tons (510 t) of coal, but her endurance is unknown. Ne Tron Menia was schooner-rigged with three iron masts. Under a combination of sail and steam the ship could reach a speed of 10 knots (19 km/h; 12 mph)

Ne Tron Menia was completed with seventeen 8-inch (203 mm) rifled guns. Fifteen were mounted on the broadside on the main deck and two guns were placed in pivot mounts on the upper deck to serve as chase guns. One of the main deck guns was removed and a 7.72-inch (196 mm) 60-pounder smoothbore gun was added on the upper deck in 1868.

Unlike Pervenets, the ship's tumblehome of 27°, intended to deflect shells, began above the waterline so the narrow vertical strake of wrought iron armor at the waterline was increased to a thickness of 5.5 inches (140 mm) in compensation for its reduced protective abilities. The rest of the ship's side was protected with 4.5 inches of armor that reduced to 4 inches (102 mm) beginning 30 feet (9.1 m) from the ship's ends. It backed by 10 inches (254 mm) of teak and extended 4 feet (1.2 m) below the waterline. The ship's hull was divided by six watertight transverse and two longitudinal bulkheads for protection against underwater damage. The open-topped conning tower was also protected by 4.5 inches of armor.

== Construction and service ==
Ne Tron Menia, Touch Me Not (from the biblical Latin phrase Noli me tangere which appears in John 20:17), was ordered on 31 May 1862 when a contract was signed with the British shipbuilder Charles Mitchell. The total price of the ship was 923,500 rubles. The state-owned Galerniy Island Shipyard in Saint Petersburg was leased to Mitchell and the Naval Ministry agreed to upgrade the facilities to handle iron-hulled, ironclad warships. The construction of a new slipway large enough to handle the ship delayed the start of construction until 30 January 1863 and the delay allowed the design to be modified to handle larger and more powerful eight-inch rifles about to enter service. These guns required more room to operate than the older, ineffectual smoothbore guns, so the main deck was slightly widened by raising the point at which the hull's tumblehome began. Based on the experiences with her sister, bilge keels 12 inches (305 mm) deep and 20 feet (6.1 m) were fitted to reduce the ship's rolling. Ne Tron Menia was not formally laid down until 1 December 1863 and she was launched on 23 June 1864.

The ship entered service on 18 July 1865 with the Baltic Fleet. She collided with the armored frigate Petropavlovsk in July 1869, and was frequently assigned to the Gunnery Training Detachment after 1870. As part of this formation, Ne Tron Menia was frequently rearmed to train officers and men on some of the latest guns to enter service. In 1880 she mounted a dozen 8-inch on her gun deck. On her upper deck, sometimes mounted on platforms that extended over her bulwarks, were a 9-inch (229 mm) mortar, a 3.42-inch (87 mm) four-pounder, four-barreled gun, a 1.75-inch (44 mm) Engstrem gun, and a 1-inch (25 mm) Palmcrantz auto-cannon. The mortar was removed in 1881 as it strained the ship's structure.

To alleviate the cramped conditions of the steersmen, the ship's wheel was transferred from the gun deck to a platform that spanned her bulwarks in front of the mizzenmast in 1871. The conning tower was removed 1876–77 and new boilers were installed. These increased the engine's power to 1,700 indicated horsepower (1,300 kW) and Ne Tron Menia reached 8.5 knots on sea trials. In 1883, she rammed the Norwegian ship Heiden in 1882 and the ship was placed in reserve three years later. She was reclassified as a coast defense ironclad on 13 February 1892 and was hulked on 23 March 1895. Ne Tron Menia served with the Mine School at Kronstadt before she was disarmed on 15 September 1905 and stricken from the Navy List on 11 October. Turned over to the Port of Kronstadt for disposal, she was sold on 8 September 1908 to be used as a barge. Ne Tron Menia was acquired by the Soviets after the Russian Civil War and then sold to the Leningrad Metal Works on 24 June 1925. During World War II, she was sunk in the Neva River. She was raised in 1950 and subsequently scrapped.

== See also ==
- List of ironclads of Russia
