= Russian ironclad Petropavlovsk =

Armored frigate in the Russian Navy during the late 19c

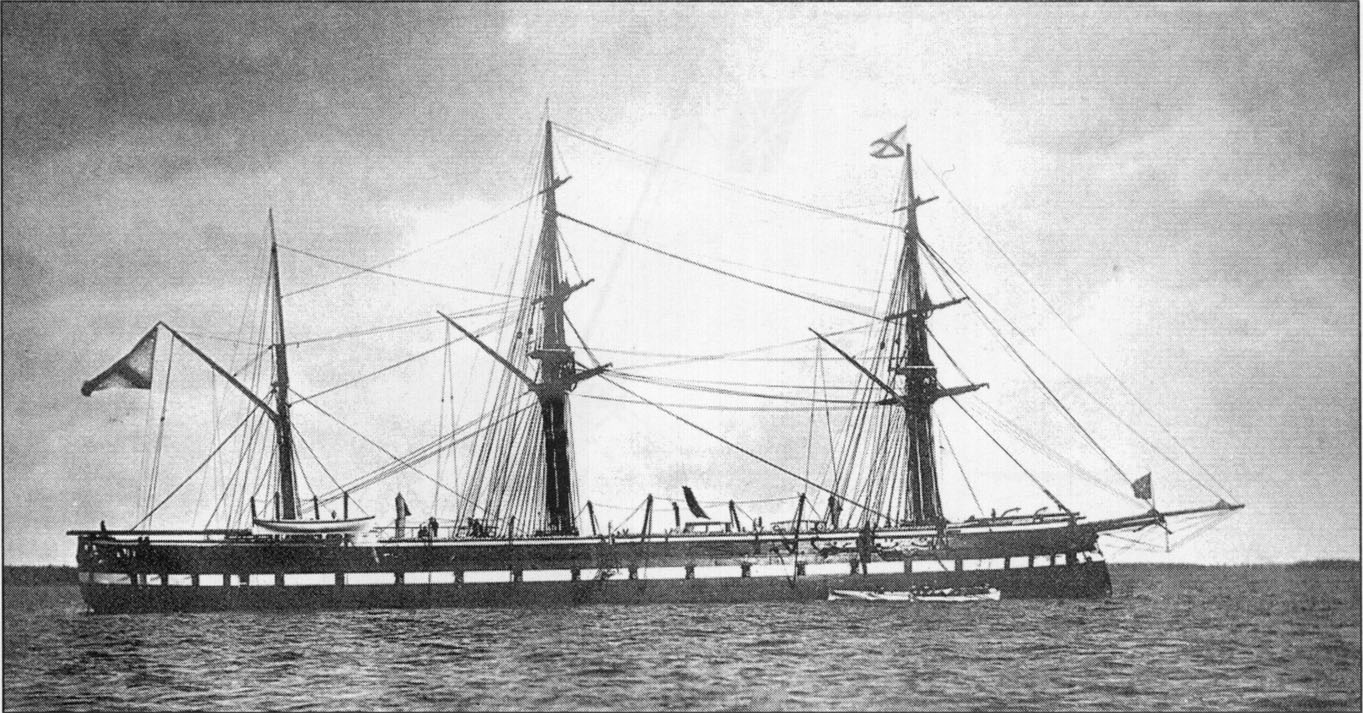
- Petropavlovsk at anchor

Class overview
- Operators: Russian Navy
- Preceded by: Sevastopol
- Succeeded by: Pervenets class
- Built: 1861–67
- In commission: 1867–85
- Completed: 1
- Scrapped: 1

History

Russian Empire
- Name: Petropavlovsk (Russian: Петропавловск)
- Namesake: Siege of Petropavlovsk
- Operator: Imperial Russian Navy
- Builder: New Admiralty Shipyard, Saint Petersburg
- Laid down: 12 January 1861 (Note: All dates used in this article are Old Style)
- Launched: 15 August 1865
- Commissioned: 1 August 1867
- Decommissioned: 15 June 1885
- Stricken: 4 January 1892
- Fate: Sold for scrap, 1892

General characteristics (as built)
- Type: Armored frigate
- Displacement: 6,040 long tons (6,137 t)
- Length: 300 ft (91.4 m)
- Beam: 50 ft 4 in (15.3 m)
- Draft: 24 ft (7.3 m)
- Installed power: 2,805 ihp (2,092 kW); Rectangular boilers
- Propulsion: 1 shaft, 1 Horizontal return-connecting-rod steam engine
- Sail plan: Ship rig
- Speed: 11.85 knots (21.95 km/h; 13.64 mph)
- Complement: 680 officers and crewmen
- Armament: 20 × 8 in (203 mm) rifled guns; 2 × 60-pounder smoothbore guns
- Armor: Belt: 3–4.5 in (76–114 mm); Battery: 4.5 in (114 mm)

The Russian ironclad Petropavlovsk (Russian: Петропавловск) was a 22-gun armored frigate in the Imperial Russian Navy during the late 19th century. She was originally ordered as a 58-gun wooden frigate, but she was reordered as an ironclad while under construction and subsequently converted into one. She served as the flagship of the Baltic Fleet during the 1860s and 1870s. The ship was decommissioned in 1885, but was not sold for scrap until 1892.

== Description ==
Petropavlovsk was 300 feet (91.4 m) long between perpendiculars, with a beam of 50 feet 4 inches (15.3 m) and a draft of 22 feet 2 inches (6.8 m) (forward) and 24 feet (7.3 m) (aft). She displaced 6,040 long tons (6,140 t) and was fitted with a blunt iron ram at her bow. Petropavlovsk was considered to be seaworthy; her total crew numbered 680 officers and enlisted men.

The ship was fitted with a horizontal return-connecting-rod steam engine built by the Baird Works of Saint Petersburg. It drove a single four-bladed propeller using steam that was provided by an unknown number of rectangular boilers. During the ship's sea trials, the engine produced a total of 2,805 indicated horsepower (2,092 kW) and gave the ship a maximum speed of 11.8 knots (21.9 km/h; 13.6 mph). The ship carried a maximum of 375 long tons (381 t) of coal, but her endurance is unknown. She was ship rigged with three masts.

As a heavy frigate, Petropavlovsk was intended to be armed with 54 of the most powerful guns available to the Russians, the 7.72-inch (196 mm) 60-pounder smoothbore gun, and four long 36-pounder smoothbores. Her armament was revised when she was converted to an ironclad and she was completed with an armament of twenty 8-inch (203 mm) rifled guns and two 60-pounder guns; all of the 8-inch guns were located on the lower deck and the 60-pounders were mounted on the upper deck as chase guns. Later another pair of 60-pounder guns were added on the upper deck. In 1877, the armament on her upper deck was changed and consisted of one 8-inch, one 6-inch (152 mm) and ten 3.4-inch (86 mm) rifled guns.

The entire ship's side was protected with wrought-iron armor that extended 5 feet 2 inches (1.6 m) below the waterline. It was 4.5 inches (114 mm) thick amidships, backed by 10 inches (254 mm) of teak, that reduced to 3 inches (76 mm), backed by six inches of teak, in steps beginning 50 feet (15.2 m) from the ship's ends.

== Construction and service ==
Petropavlovsk, named for the siege of Petropavlovsk during the Crimean War, was laid down on 12 January 1861 as a 58-gun heavy frigate at the New Admiralty Shipyard in Saint Petersburg. She was reordered as (converted into) a 22-gun armored frigate on 29 October 1861 while still under construction. The ship was launched on 15 August 1865 and commissioned on 1 August 1867. During the 1860s and 1870s, Petropavlovsk served as the flagship of the Baltic Fleet. On 15 August 1869, she was taking part in an exercise off Hogland with Kreml, Oleg, Pervenets and Vityaz when Kreml rammed Oleg, which sank with the loss of 16 of her 445 crew. Petropavlovsk rescued some of the survivors. On 13 September 1871, she collided with the Russian merchant ship Damrowsky off Reval, damaging the merchantman's rigging. Also in September, she collided with the British merchant ship Ecliptic. She was decommissioned on 15 June 1885, stricken from the Navy List on 4 January 1892 and subsequently sold for scrap.
