= Pyotr Serebrennikov =

Russian navy captain (1853–1905)

- Пётр Серебренников
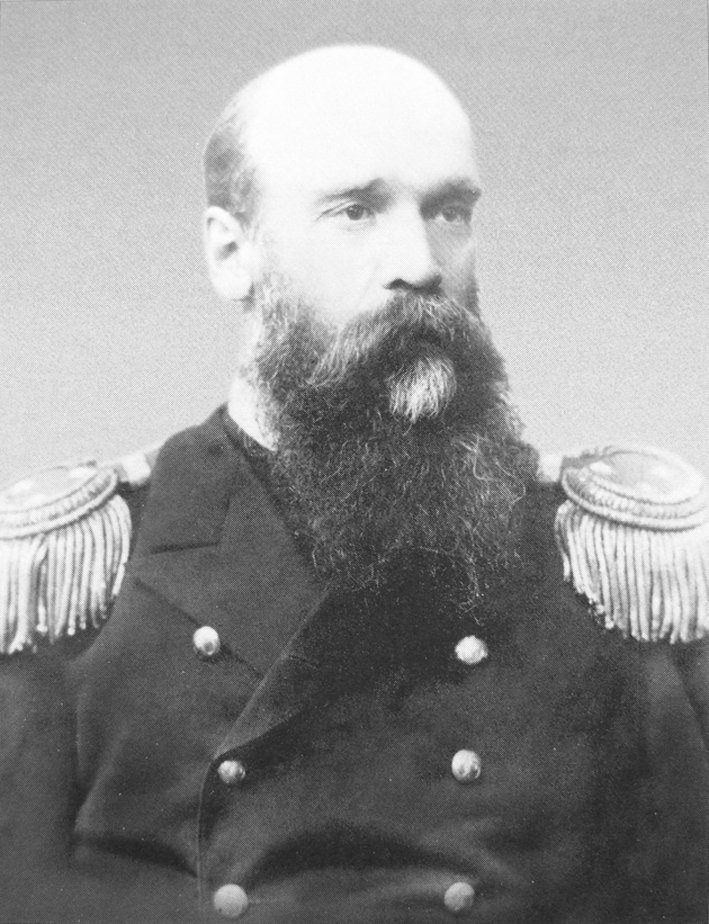
- Born: 22 June 1853; Nizhny Novgorod Governorate, Russia
- Died: 27 May 1905 (aged 51); Straits of Tsushima
- Alma mater: Naval Cadet Corps
- Spouse: Faineva Vera Ivanovna
- Children: 1 (Ekaterina)
- Military career
- Allegiance: Russia
- Branch: Imperial Russian Navy
- Service years: 1870 – 1905
- Rank: Captain 1st rank
- Unit: Second Pacific Squadron
- Commands: Borodino
- Conflicts: Russo-Japanese War; Battle of Tsushima †

Pyotr Iosifovich Serebrennikov (Russian: Пётр Ио́сифович Сере́бренников; 22 June 1853 – 27 May 1905) was a Russian Captain 1st rank and war hero of the Russo-Japanese War. He commanded the Russian battleship Borodino during the war but was killed during the Battle of Tsushima after the ship was sunk in the battle.

== Early Career and Narodnaya Volya ==
Serebrennikov was born at the Nizhny Novgorod Governorate as the son of a Collegiate Councillor. He enrolled in the Naval Cadet Corps on 16 September 1870, before entering active service on 31 March 1871. He was made a Garde de la Marine on 31 March 1874 and promoted to midshipman on 30 August 1875. Around this time, he was a member of the naval circle of the Military Organization of the Narodnaya Volya party at Kronstadt. In 1874, together with midshipman Vladimir Miklukha, Serebrennikov distributed literature of the Narodnaya Volya and intended to leave military service in order to "go with the people." However, after the defeat of the Narodnaya Volya Military Organization, he subsequently left all revolutionary activity.

== Military career ==
From 22 September 1875 to 29 May 1876 he was sent to the variable composition of the Naval Cadet Corps. Serebrennikov was then made the acting auditor of the Izumrud on 19 October 1876, before being transferred to the 1st Naval Crew on 17 February 1877 which resulted in his promotion to Lieutenant on 1 January 1884. He was then given command of the cruiser Europa and later made the inspector of the Petr Veliky on 15 October 1884 along with being transferred to the 3rd Naval Crew. He was later enrolled in naval mine classes on 18 January 1888 for two months, managing to graduate on 29 March 1888 with a satisfactory grade. Later on, he was given command of Destroyer No. 63 as part of the Skherny Detachment on 20 April 1888 before being transferred to the 1st Naval Crew while sailing with the Mandzhur on 4 May 1888. He was transferred again to the 4th Naval Corps on 11 November 1888 as an inspector of the Vladimir Monomakh and was promoted to Lieutenant Commander on 21 April 1890 but was decommissioned from the ship and back to the crew on 30 May 1890. By the next day however, Serebrennikov was given command of Destroyer No. 116 but 8 days later, was given command of the gunboat Rain and transferred to the 2nd Naval Crew.

From 11 September 1890 to 1 March 1891 he was a reserve member of the port of Kronstadt before being promoted to Captain 2nd rank on 21 April 1891. Due to his new rank, he was made the senior officer of the armored cruiser Rossia from 1891 to 1896 and given command of the Gaydamak on 13 June 1896. From 19 May 1897 to 6 December 1898 he commanded the Korietz before commanding the Veschun for 3 days. From 29 March 1899 to 18 April 1899, Serebrennikov commanded the Strelets and was promoted to Captain 1st rank on 18 April 1899 for distinct service. Later on, from 27 March 1900 to 9 September 1902, he commanded the Rossia again before being made the commander of the 18th Naval Crew in December 1902. On 27 May 1905 he died while commanding the Borodino in the Battle of Tsushima. Before the battle, Serebrennikov was described as being well liked by his crew due to his courteous attitude and consistent rationing of his crew. During the battle, he was seriously wounded on his neck and his right hand was torn off but even on the operating table he "didn't lose consciousness for a minute and gave orders all the time, taking an interest in the course of the battle and encouraging the team" before the ship sunk with Serebrennikov going down with it.

== Awards ==
- Order of Saint Stanislaus, III Class (4 August 1879)
- Order of Saint Anna, III Class (1 January 1887)
- Order of Saint Vladimir, IV Class with bow (22 September 1890)
- Order of Saint Stanislaus, II Class (1892)
- Order of Saint Vladimir, IV Class with bow (22 September 1895) for 20 campaigns
- Order of Saint Anna, II Class (6 December 1895)
- Order of Saint Vladimir, III Class (6 December 1901)
