= Russian ironclad Kreml =

Imperial Russian Navy's Pervenets-class broadside ironclad

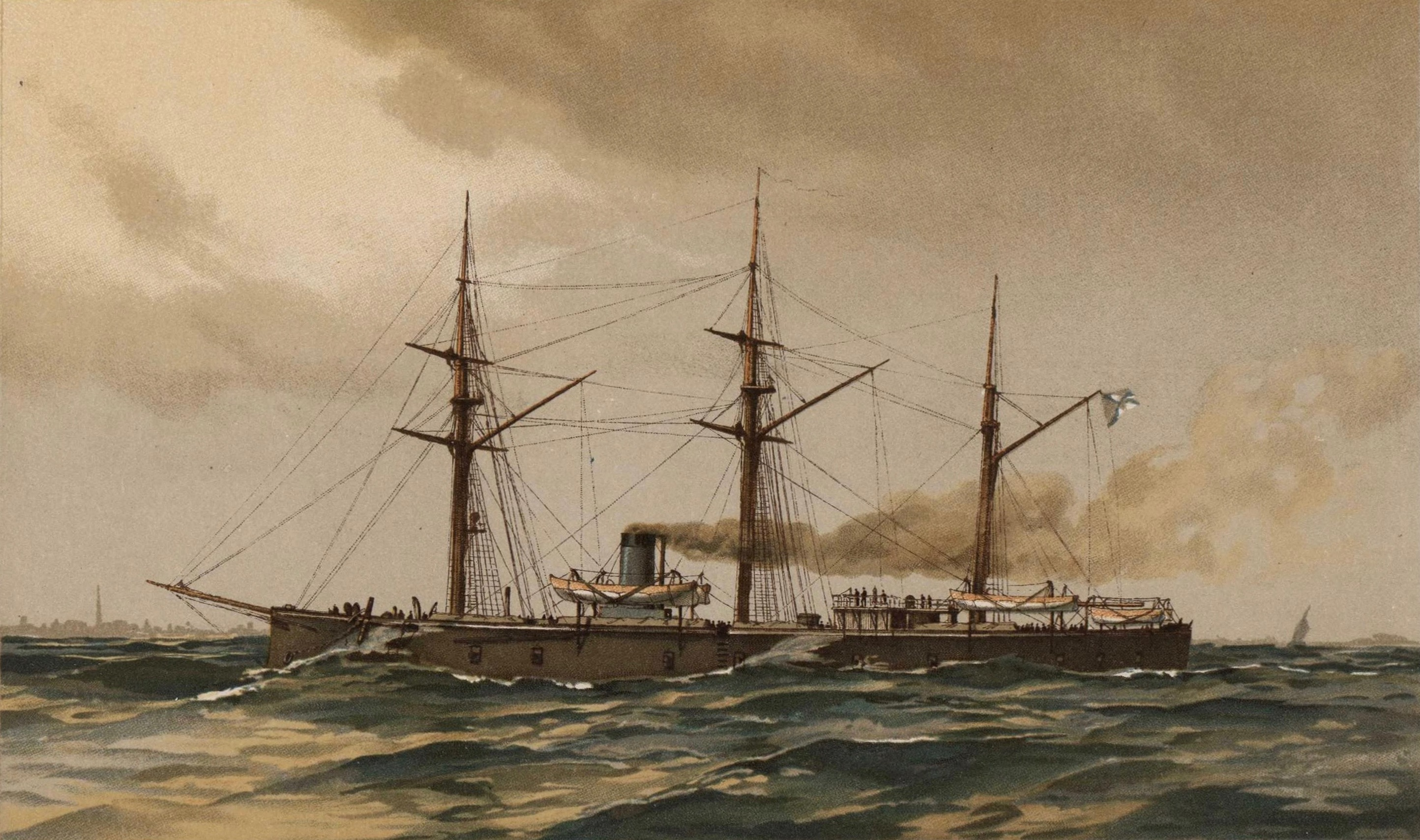

History

Russian Empire
- Name: Kreml (Russian: Кремль)
- Namesake: Kremlin
- Ordered: 20 April 1863
- Builder: Semiannikov & Poletika, St. Petersburg
- Cost: 898,000 rubles (hull and machinery only)
- Laid down: 23 December 1863 (Note: All dates used in this article are New Style.)
- Launched: 26 August 1865
- Commissioned: 1866
- Reclassified: Coast defense ironclad, 13 February 1892
- Stricken: 12 October 1905
- Fate: Sold for scrap, 8 September 1908

General characteristics (as completed)
- Class & type: Pervenets-class broadside ironclad
- Displacement: 3,664 long tons (3,723 t)
- Length: 221 ft (67.4 m) (o/a)
- Beam: 53 ft (16.2 m)
- Draft: 15 ft (4.6 m) (mean)
- Installed power: 913 ihp (681 kW); 4 rectangular fire-tube boilers
- Propulsion: 1 shaft; 1 horizontal trunk steam engine
- Speed: 8 knots (15 km/h; 9.2 mph)
- Range: 2,000 nautical miles (3,700 km; 2,300 mi)
- Complement: 430 officers and crewmen
- Armament: 17 × 7.72-inch (196 mm) 60-pounder smoothbore guns
- Armor: Belt: 4.5 in (114 mm); Deck: 1.14 in (29 mm); Bulkheads: 4.5 in (114 mm)

The Russian ironclad Kreml (Russian: Кремль) was the third and last Pervenets-class broadside ironclad built for the Imperial Russian Navy during the mid-1860s. She joined the Baltic Fleet upon completion and accidentally sank a Russian frigate in 1869. The ship was assigned to the Gunnery Training Detachment in 1870 and was frequently rearmed. Kreml sank in shallow water after a storm in 1885; she was refloated and returned to service. The ship was placed in reserve in 1904 and disarmed the following year before being sold for scrap in 1908.

== Design and description ==
The Pervenents-class ironclads were designed as coastal defence ships to protect the approaches to Saint Petersburg and were referred to as "self-propelled armored floating batteries". As such, heavy armament and protection were the most important factors in their design.

Kreml was 221 feet (67.4 m) long overall, with a beam of 53 feet (16.2 m) and a mean draft of 15 feet (4.6 m). Displacing 3,664 long tons (3,723 t) at full load, she was somewhat larger than her half-sisters and displaced over 300 long tons (300 t) more. She was fitted with a ram bow and lacked the stern ram of her half-sisters. Based on the experiences with her sister Pervenets, bilge keels 12 inches (305 mm) deep and 20 feet (6.1 m) long were fitted to reduce the ship's rolling. The ship did not steer well and historian Stephen McLaughlin notes that she had "an unpredictable habit of suddenly lurching to one side or another", probably as a result of poor water flow to the rudder. Kreml required six men to man her wheel and her total crew numbered 459 officers and enlisted men.

As a cost-cutting measure, the ship received the refurbished horizontal trunk steam engine from the wooden frigate Ilya Muromets, built by Carr and MacPherson of Saint Petersburg. It had two cylinders, each with a bore of 83.6 inches (2,120 mm) and a stroke of 36 inches (910 mm). Using steam produced by four rectangular fire-tube boilers to drive a single 13-foot-6-inch (4.11 m) propeller, the engine was designed to produce 870 indicated horsepower (650 kW) and gave the ship a maximum speed of 7.08–8.93 knots (13.11–16.54 km/h; 8.15–10.28 mph) during her sea trials on 18 October 1866. Kreml's boilers proved to be unable to last more than about a decade in service before they had to be replaced, notably in 1876, 1886, 1892 and 1901. To save money, the replacement boilers were taken from retiring ships and reconditioned before installation in Kreml.

The ship was intended to be rigged as a three-masted schooner, like her half-sisters, but her first captain suggested that her fore- and mainmasts be square rigged to take advantage of her more seaworthy hull form. Kreml's masts were hollow iron and were used to ventilate the lower decks, the first such masts in the Imperial Russian Navy. To protect her leadsmen, sailors who determined the depth of water under the keel, in combat, Kreml was fitted with two sounding tubes that led from the gun deck through the bottom of the hull.

Kreml was completed with 17 of the most powerful guns available to the Russians, the 7.72-inch (196 mm) 60-pounder smoothbore gun. Fifteen were mounted on the broadside and two guns were placed in pivot mounts on the upper deck to serve as chase guns. Unfortunately, it proved to be incapable of penetrating 4.5 inches (114 mm) of wrought iron armor at a distance of only 200 yards (183 m) during trials in 1859–60. Despite this, the ship continued to be armed with varying numbers of these guns, as well as 8-inch (203 mm) rifled guns throughout her career. Her upper deck armament changed even more frequently and used different configurations of 6-inch (152 mm) and 8-inch rifled guns in addition to varying numbers of smaller guns.

The ship's armor configuration differed from that of her half-sisters. Most of her side was covered by 4.5-inch (110 mm) of wrought-iron armor, but transverse armored bulkheads of the same thickness protected the gun deck from raking fire and the upper part of the hull outside the bulkheads was unprotected. The teak backing of the armor was increased to 15 inches (381 mm). Kreml's deck had a maximum thickness of 1.14 inches (29 mm). The conning tower was also protected by 4.5 inches of armor. The ship's hull was divided by four watertight transverse and two longitudinal bulkheads for protection against underwater damage.

== Construction and service ==
Kreml, named after the Kremlin, was ordered on 20 April 1863 when a contract was signed with the Russian shipbuilder Semiannikov & Poletika for a total cost of 898,000 rubles. Construction had not yet begun when the Russian Admiralty Board amended the contract on 20 July to shorten the construction time by one year for a payment of an extra 48,000 rubles in response to the adverse foreign reaction to the brutal Russian suppression of the revolts in Poland and Lithuania that year. Fearing attack by Britain and France, the Board switched priority to the smaller Uragan-class monitors shortly afterwards in the belief that they could be completed more quickly so that progress on Kreml slowed to a crawl once construction began on 2 October. The ship was not formally laid down until 23 December and she was launched on 26 August 1865.

The ship entered service in 1866 with the Baltic Fleet. During exercises with Oleg, Pervenets, Petropavlovsk and Vityaz off Hogland on 15 August 1869, she accidentally collided with and sank the wooden steam frigate Oleg, killing 16 of the 445 crew of Oleg. Survivors were rescued by the four ships. Kreml was only slightly damaged. She was assigned to the Gunnery Training Detachment in March 1870 and remained with it for the bulk of her career. In November 1881, the steam-powered steering gear taken from the ironclad Petr Veliky was installed which required the installation of a high-pressure donkey boiler in the cramped boiler room. This proved to be more trouble than it was worth and was removed two years later. Kreml was caught by a storm on 10 June 1885 while sailing for Reval and began taking on so much water that her captain decided to make for shallow water; she reached Kunda Bay, on the Estonian coast, under sail alone after her engine bearings overheated and forced the engine to be stopped. Once there, the progressive flooding continued through the ventilation shafts, sounding tubes, and defective valves in the internal bulkheads, and the ship sank in 26 feet (7.9 m) of water. Kreml was refloated on five days later and repaired in Kronstadt. She was reclassified as coast-defense ironclad on 13 February 1892 and placed in reserve on 24 December 1904. Kreml was disarmed and turned over to the Port of Kronstadt for disposal on 15 September 1905. She was stricken from the Navy List on 12 October and sold for scrap on 8 September 1908.
