= Russian frigate General Admiral =

Russian screw frigate

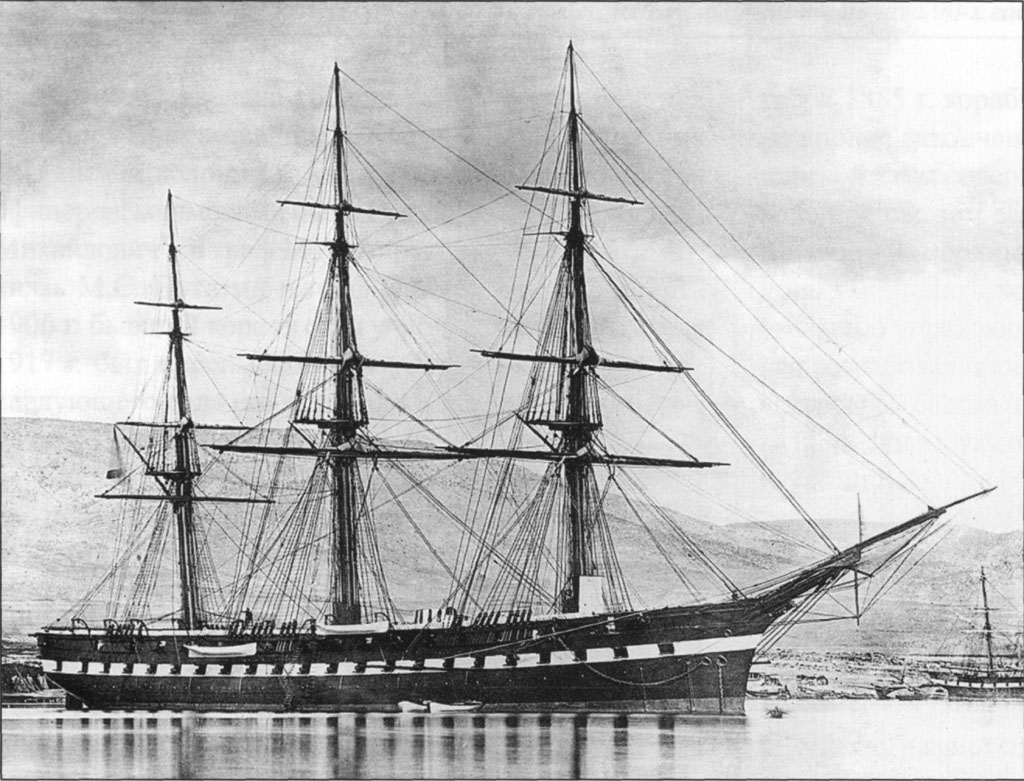
- General Admiral

Class overview
- Name: General Admiral (Russian: Генерал-адмирал)
- Operators: Imperial Russian Navy
- Built: 1857–1859
- In commission: 1859–1870
- Completed: 1
- Scrapped: 1

History

Russian Empire
- Name: General Admiral
- Namesake: Grand Duke Konstantin Nikolayevich of Russia
- Operator: Imperial Russian Navy
- Builder: William H. Webb Shipyard, New York City
- Laid down: 21 September 1857 (Note: All dates used in this article are New Style)
- Launched: 3 September 1858
- Commissioned: 15 March 1859
- Stricken: 26 June 1869
- Fate: Broken up 1870

General characteristics (as built)
- Type: Steam frigate
- Displacement: 5,669 long tons (5,760 t)
- Length: 305 ft (93.0 m) (p/p)
- Beam: 54 ft 8 in (16.7 m)
- Draft: 23 ft 6 in (7.2 m)
- Installed power: 2,000 ihp (1,500 kW); 6 fire-tube boilers
- Propulsion: 1 shaft, 2 steam engines
- Speed: 12.25 knots (22.69 km/h; 14.10 mph)
- Range: 5,000 nmi (9,300 km; 5,800 mi)
- Complement: 790–825 officers and crewmen
- Armament: Lower deck: 36 × 60-pounder shell guns; 4 × long 36-pounder guns; Upper deck: 2 × 10.75 in (273 mm) 3-pood pivot guns; 24 × 60-pounder shell guns; 2 × long 36-pounder guns

General Admiral (Russian: Генерал-адмирал) was a screw frigate ordered by the Imperial Russian Navy from the United States before the American Civil War. She spent the bulk of her career in the Mediterranean Sea where she evacuated insurgents and their families from Crete in 1868 during the Cretan Revolt. She was struck from the Navy List the following year and broken up in 1870.

== Description ==
General Admiral was a very large screw frigate designed by Captain 1st Rank Ivan Shestakov and named after General Admiral Grand Duke Konstantin Nikolayevich of Russia, commander of the Russian Navy. She was built of live oak, but was reinforced with diagonal and longitudinal iron braces. General Admiral displaced 5,669 long tons (5,760 t). She was 305 feet (93.0 m) long between perpendiculars, had a beam of 54 feet 8 inches (16.7 m) and a deep draft of 23 ft 6 in (7.2 m). She was sheathed in copper to reduce biofouling. A novel system of zinc pipes that penetrated sheathing and connected with the ventilation fan was installed in the hold to prevent the decay of her hull. Its efficacy is unknown although General Admiral's short life suggests that it was not effective.

Two steam engines, rated at a total of 2,000 indicated horsepower (1,500 kW), and six fire-tube boilers powered the single propeller when the ship was under steam. Using her engines, she had a maximum speed of 12.25 knots (22.69 km/h; 14.10 mph). General Admiral's propeller could be hoisted out of the water and her funnel retracted to improve her sailing qualities. She was considered to be an excellent sailer and could reach 14 knots (26 km/h; 16 mph) under sail alone. She carried 750 long tons (760 t) of coal which gave her a range of 5,000 nautical miles (9,300 km; 5,800 mi), but it was her 75 days of provisions that were the practical limit of her endurance.

General Admiral's armament was made and installed in Russia. Her battery deck carried thirty-six 60-pounder muzzle-loading guns and four long 36-pounder chase guns. The upper deck had twenty-four 60-pounder guns and two long 36-pounder chase guns. Two 3-pood shell guns were mounted fore and aft on revolving platforms. In 1862 her armament was revised and two 60-pounder and the two long 36-pounder guns on her upper deck were removed. Four years later, it was rearranged with two 60-pounders moved from her upper deck to the lower deck and two long 36-pounders moved from the lower deck to the upper deck.

== Career ==
General Admiral was laid down on 21 September 1857 at the William H. Webb Shipyard in New York City. She was launched on 3 September 1858 and was delivered to Kronstadt on 15 March 1859 by an American crew, commanded by an American captain, although Captain Shestakov accompanied her back to Russia. Her total cost, including delivery, was 1,419,629.51 silver rubles. En route she only took 11 days to reach Cherbourg from New York City under steam, a record time for a warship at that time. She sailed for the Mediterranean the following year under the command of Captain Shestakov, stopping at Kiel in July 1860. While in the Mediterranean she made port visits at Beirut, Piraeus and Nice. General Admiral departed Nice on 16 April 1863 for the Baltic Sea. She met the newly completed coast-defence ship Pervenets en route and escorted her from England to the Baltic.

Three years later, on 8 June 1866, General Admiral departed Kronstadt for the Mediterranean, making a port visit at Copenhagen on 22 June en route. In June 1867 she made another port visit at Piraeus before leaving Cádiz on 26 July bound for the Baltic. She returned to the Mediterranean the next year and evacuated Cretan insurgents and their families in 1868 during the Cretan Revolt against the Ottoman Empire. Having returned to Russia by 1869, she was struck from the Navy List on 26 June 1869 and broken up the following year.
