= Russian ironclad Sevastopol =

Imperial Russian Navy's 58-gun wooden frigate

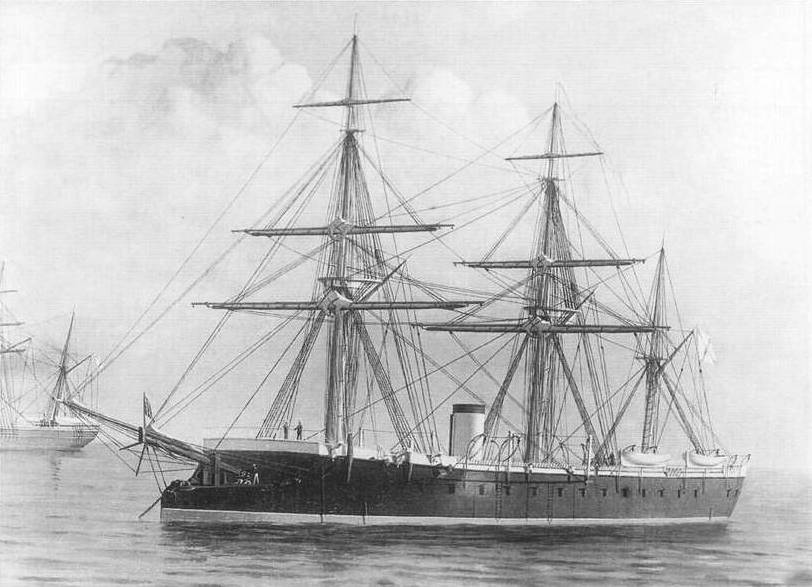
- A drawing of Sevastopol at anchor

Class overview
- Operators: Russian Navy
- Preceded by: None
- Succeeded by: Petropavlovsk
- Built: 1861–65
- In service: 1865–1886
- Completed: 1
- Scrapped: 1

History

Russian Empire
- Name: Sevastopol (Russian: Севастополь)
- Namesake: Siege of Sevastopol
- Operator: Imperial Russian Navy
- Builder: Kronstadt Shipyard, Kronstadt
- Laid down: 7 September 1860 (Note: All dates used in this article are Old Style.)
- Launched: 12 August 1864
- Commissioned: 8 July 1865
- Decommissioned: 15 June 1885
- Reclassified: As training ship, 23 March 1880
- Stricken: 11 October 1886
- Fate: Sold for scrap, May 1897

General characteristics (as built)
- Type: Armored frigate
- Displacement: 6,275 long tons (6,376 t)
- Length: 300 ft (91.4 m)
- Beam: 50 ft 4 in (15.3 m)
- Draft: 24 ft (7.3 m)
- Installed power: 3,090 ihp (2,300 kW); Rectangular boilers
- Propulsion: 1 shaft, 1 Horizontal return-connecting-rod steam engine
- Sail plan: Schooner
- Speed: 13 knots (24 km/h; 15 mph)
- Complement: 607 officers and crewmen
- Armament: 32 × 60-pounder smoothbore guns
- Armor: Belt: 3–4.5 in (76–114 mm); Battery: 4.5 in (114 mm)

The Russian ironclad Sevastopol (Russian: Севастополь) was ordered as a 58-gun wooden frigate by the Imperial Russian Navy in the early 1860s, but was converted while under construction into a 32-gun armored frigate. She served in the Baltic Fleet and was reclassified as a training ship in 1880. Sevastopol was decommissioned five years later, but was not sold for scrap until 1897.

== Description ==
Sevastopol was 300 feet (91.4 m) long between perpendiculars, with a beam of 50 feet 4 inches (15.3 m) and a draft of 22 feet 2 inches (6.8 m) (forward) and 24 feet (7.3 m) (aft). She displaced 6,135 long tons (6,233 t) and she was fitted with a blunt iron ram at her bow. Sevastopol was considered to be a good sea boat and her total crew numbered 607 officers and enlisted men.

The ship was fitted with a horizontal return-connecting-rod steam engine built by the Izhora Works of Saint Petersburg. It drove a single two-bladed propeller using steam that was provided by an unknown number of rectangular boilers. During the ship's sea trials, the engine produced a total of 3,088 indicated horsepower (2,303 kW) and gave the ship a maximum speed of 13.95 knots (25.84 km/h; 16.05 mph). The ship carried a maximum of 400 long tons (410 t) of coal, but her endurance is unknown. She was schooner-rigged with three masts.

As a heavy frigate, Sevastopol was intended to be armed with 54 of the most powerful guns available to the Russians, the 7.72-inch (196 mm) 60-pounder smoothbore gun, and four long 36-pounder smoothbores. Her armament was revised when she was converted to an ironclad and she was completed with an armament of thirty-two 60-pounder guns, four on the upper deck as chase guns and 28 on the lower deck. In 1868, one chase gun and two guns on the lower deck were replaced by 8-inch (203 mm) rifled guns and 11 more of the 60-pounders were replaced by seven 8-inch guns two years later. In 1877, her armament was changed again to 14 eight-inch guns on the lower deck and two more on the upper deck. Also mounted on the upper deck were one 6-inch (152 mm) and ten 3.4-inch (86 mm) rifled guns.

The entire ship's side was protected with wrought-iron armor that extended 5 feet 2 inches (1.6 m) below the waterline. It was 4.5 inches (114 mm) thick amidships, backed by 10 inches (254 mm) of teak, that thinned to 3 inches (76 mm), backed by six inches of teak, in steps beginning 50 feet (15.2 m) from the ship's ends.

== Construction and service ==
Sevastopol, named for the Siege of Sevastopol during the Crimean War, was laid down on 7 September 1860 as a 58-gun heavy frigate at Kronstadt. She was reordered as (converted into) a 32-gun armored frigate on 26 July 1862 while still under construction. The ship was launched on 12 August 1864 and commissioned on 8 July 1865. In 1870, repairs to her stern were made by raising her at the stern using air bags. She served with the Baltic Fleet for her entire career and was reclassified as a training ship on 23 March 1880. Sevastopol was decommissioned on 15 June 1885 and sold for breaking up in May 1897.
