= Russian ironclad Pervenets =

Imperial Russian Navy's Pervenets-class broadside ironclad

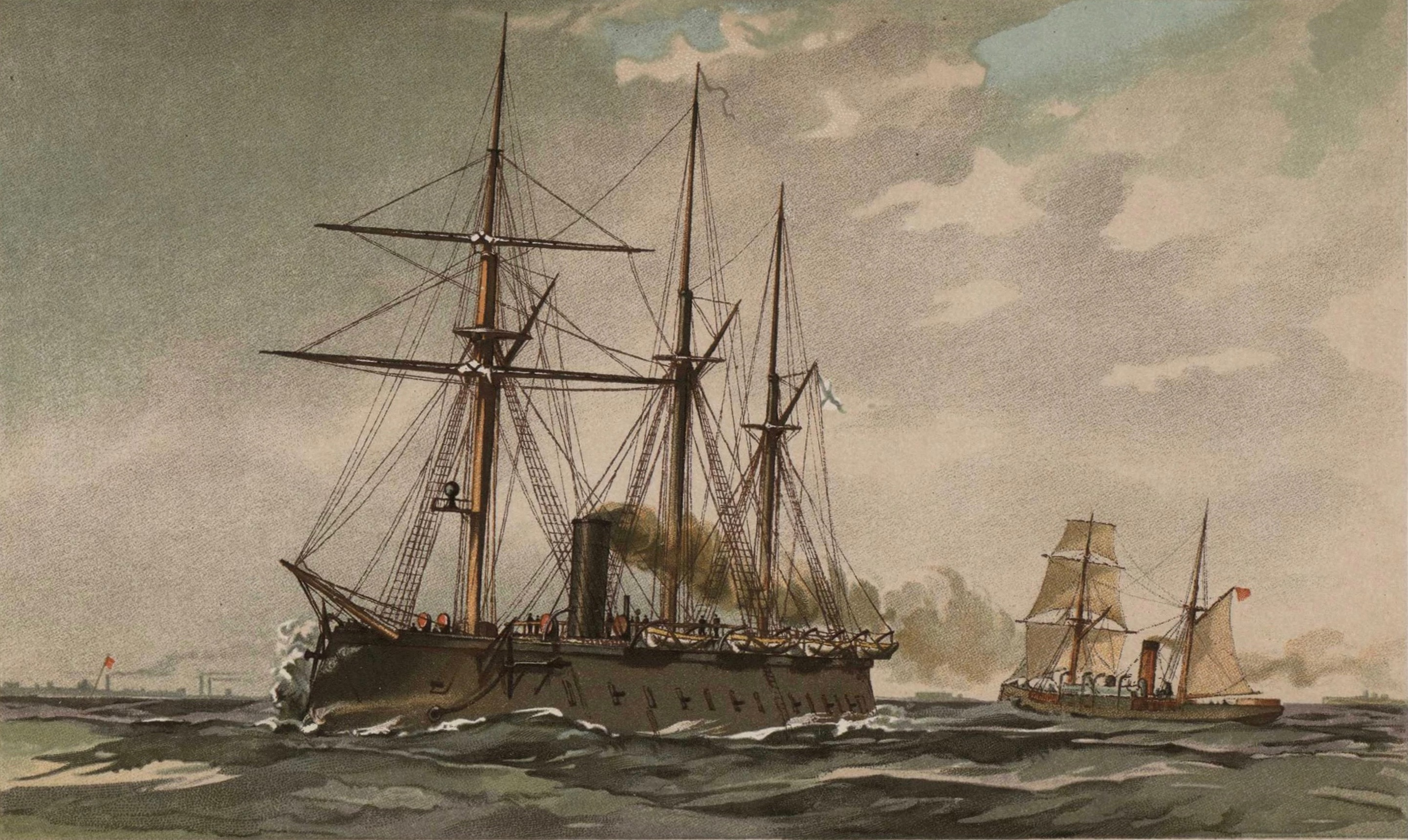
- Pervenets as depicted by an 1893 lithograph

History

Russian Empire
- Name: Pervenets (Russian: Первенец)
- Operator: Imperial Russian Navy
- Ordered: 18 November 1861
- Builder: Thames Iron Works, Blackwall, London
- Cost: 917,000 rubles
- Laid down: December 1861
- Launched: 18 May 1863 (Note: All dates used in this article are New Style)
- Commissioned: 28 July 1864
- Reclassified: Coast defense ship, 13 February 1892
- Stricken: 15 September 1905
- Fate: Sold for use as a barge, 8 August 1908

Soviet Union
- Name: Barzha No. 1 (Barge No. 1)
- Acquired: 30 June 1922
- Renamed: KP-3, 1 January 1932; K-41999, 12 July 1943; VSN-491000, 16 May 1949
- Stricken: Late 1950s
- Fate: Scrapped, 1960s

General characteristics (as completed)
- Class & type: Pervenets-class broadside ironclad
- Displacement: 3,277 long tons (3,330 t)
- Length: 220 ft (67.1 m)
- Beam: 53 ft (16.2 m)
- Draft: 14 ft 6 in (4.4 m)
- Installed power: 1,000 ihp (750 kW); 4 × rectangular fire-tube boilers
- Propulsion: 1 shaft,1 × 3-cylinder horizontal return-connecting-rod steam engine
- Sail plan: Schooner
- Speed: 8 knots (15 km/h; 9.2 mph)
- Complement: 459 officers and crewmen
- Armament: 26 × 7.72-inch (196 mm) 60-pounder smoothbore guns
- Armor: Belt: 4–4.5 in (102–114 mm)

The Russian ironclad Pervenets (Russian: Первенец) was a broadside ironclad built for the Imperial Russian Navy in Britain during the 1860s. The ship had to be built abroad as no Russian shipyard had mastered the techniques required to build iron-hulled armored vessels. She was assigned to the Baltic Fleet upon completion and never left Russian waters. Pervenets served with the Gunnery Training Detachment for her entire career until she was reduced to reserve in 1904. She was disarmed and stricken the following year and finally sold in 1908. After the end of the Russian Civil War, the ship was reacquired by the Soviets in 1922 and used to transport and store coal, a role she performed until discarded in the late 1950s. However, she was apparently not scrapped until the early 1960s.

== Design and description ==
The ship was designed as a coast defense vessel to protect the approaches to Saint Petersburg and was referred to as a "self-propelled armored floating battery". As such, a heavy armament and protection were the most important factors in the ship's design. No Russian shipyard could build iron-hulled, ironclad warships, therefore Pervenets was ordered from Great Britain. Her name means firstborn and refers to the Tsesarevich, heir to the Russian Empire.

Pervenets was 220 feet (67.1 m) long overall, with a beam of 53 feet (16.2 m) and a designed draft of 14 feet 6 inches (4.4 m). She displaced 3,277 long tons (3,330 t) and her iron hull had a pronounced tumblehome. Pervenets was fitted with large rams at bow and stern; the stern ram also serving to protect her rudder and propeller. The ship did not steer well and had "an unpredictable habit of suddenly lurching to one side or another", probably as a result of poor water flow to the rudder. She required six men to man her wheel and her total crew numbered 459 officers and men.

Originally intended to use a refurbished engine from the steam ship of the line Konstantin, Pervenets received a three-cylinder horizontal return-connecting-rod steam engine built by the British firm of Maudslay, Sons and Field. Rated at 1,000 indicated horsepower (750 kW), it drove a single 10-foot-5-inch (3.2 m) propeller. Steam was provided by four rectangular fire-tube boilers. During sea trials on 28 July 1863, the engine produced a total of 1,067 indicated horsepower (796 kW) and gave the ship a maximum speed of 8 knots (15 km/h; 9.2 mph). During later trials in the Baltic Sea, Pervenets reached 8.5 knots (15.7 km/h; 9.8 mph). The ship carried a maximum of 500 long tons (510 t) of coal, but her endurance is unknown. She was schooner-rigged with three masts; the lower masts were iron and the topmasts and yards were made from pine.

Pervenets was completed with 26 of the most powerful guns available to the Russians, the 7.72-inch (196 mm) 60-pounder smoothbore gun. Twenty-four were mounted on the broadside and two guns were placed in pivot mounts on the upper deck to serve as chase guns. Unfortunately, it proved to be incapable of penetrating 4.5 inches (114 mm) of wrought iron armor at a distance of only 200 yards (183 m) during trials in 1859–60. The 60-pounders on the broadside were entirely replaced by a dozen 8-inch (203 mm) rifled guns in 1874, while the chase guns were replaced by two four-barreled 3.42-inch (87 mm) 4-pounder guns.

The entire ship's side was protected with wrought-iron armor 4.5 inches thick that reduced to 4 inches (102 mm) beginning 30 feet (9.1 m) from the ship's ends. It was backed by 10 inches (254 mm) of teak and extended 4 feet (1.2 m) below the waterline. The ship's hull was divided by six watertight transverse and two longitudinal bulkheads for protection against underwater damage. The hull had a tumblehome of 27° to help deflect shells. The open-topped conning tower was also protected by 4.5 inches of armor.

== Service ==
Pervenets was ordered from the Thames Iron Works in Blackwall, London on 18 November 1861 because it was an experienced builder of iron-hulled ships and had begun construction of the broadside ironclad HMS Minotaur a few months earlier. Russian naval architects and workmen were sent to London to learn the techniques used by the British shipyard. Construction of the ship actually began the following month and she was launched on 18 May 1863. While running sea trials on 6 August 1863 at Woolwich, Pervenets accidentally rammed the training ship HMS Warspite, although little damage was inflicted. Escorted by the steam frigate General Admiral, she left for Russia two days later with a British crew. The ship reached Kronstadt on 17 August and was fitted out there. Pervenets entered service on 28 July 1864 and was assigned to the Baltic Fleet. Including delivery and fitting out costs, she cost a total of 917,000 rubles.

The ship was assigned to the Gunnery Training Detachment for her entire career and was frequently rearmed to train officers and men on some of the latest guns to enter service. In 1881 she mounted ten 8-inch and two 6-inch (152 mm) rifled breech loaders on her gun deck and carried two more 6-inch rifles on the upper deck as chase guns. Also on her upper deck, sometimes mounted on platforms that extended over her bulwarks, were a 9-inch (229 mm) mortar, a 2.5-inch (64 mm) Baranov gun, a 1.75-inch (44 mm) Engstrem gun, two 1-inch (25 mm) Palmcrantz auto-cannon, and a Hotchkiss gun of uncertain caliber, either 37 millimeters (1.5 in) or 47 millimeters (1.9 in). The mortar was removed in 1881 as it strained the ship's structure. By 1890, these guns had been replaced by two 120-millimeter (4.7 in), two 47 mm, and four 37 mm guns.

Pervenets rolled heavily in service, therefore bilge keels were fitted during the winter of 1864–65, the first used on a Russian ship. On 15 August 1869, she was taking part in an exercise off Hogland with Kreml, Oleg, Petropavlovsk and Vityaz when Kreml rammed Oleg, which sank with the loss of 16 of her 445 crew. Pervenets rescued some of the survivors. To alleviate the cramped conditions of the steersmen, the ship's wheel was transferred from the gun deck to a platform that spanned her bulwarks in front of the mizzenmast in 1871. In 1872 she evaluated the Davydov fire-control system that could fire all guns electrically and indicated to the gunners where their guns should be aimed. The conning tower was removed in 1876–77 and new boilers were installed. These increased the engine's power to 1,300 indicated horsepower (970 kW) and Pervenets reached 8.5 knots on sea trials. She was reclassified as a coast defense ironclad on 13 February 1892 and was placed in reserve on 23 December 1904. The ship was disarmed the following year and stricken from the Navy List on 15 September 1905. Turned over to the Port of Kronstadt for disposal, she was sold on 8 September 1908 and renamed Barge No. 1 (Barzha No. 1).

The Soviets acquired the ship on 30 June 1922 and she was used to transport coal to Kronstadt. Barzha No. 1 was transferred to the Baltic Fleet on 7 August 1925 for use as a coal hulk. She was renamed KP-3 on 1 January 1932, K-41999 on 12 July 1943 and VSN-491000 on 16 May 1949. The ship was discarded in the late 1950s, but was apparently not scrapped until the early 1960s.
