= Pervenets-class ironclad =

Russian armored frigate class

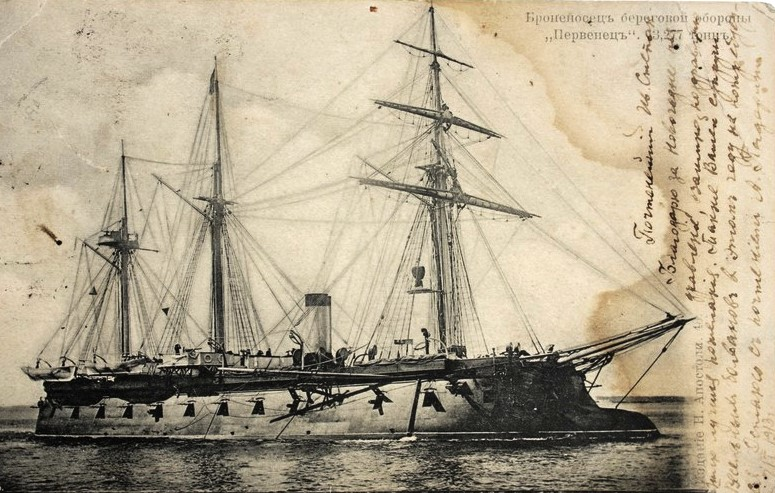
- A postcard of Pervenets at anchor

Class overview
- Name: Pervenetz
- Operators: Imperial Russian Navy
- Preceded by: Sevastopol
- Succeeded by: Kniaz Pozharsky
- Built: 1861–1866
- In service: 1864–1904
- Completed: 3
- Scrapped: 3

General characteristics (Pervenets as built)
- Type: Armored frigate
- Displacement: 3,277 long tons (3,330 t)
- Length: 220 ft (67 m)
- Beam: 53 ft (16 m)
- Draft: 14 ft 6 in (4.42 m)
- Installed power: 1,067 ihp (796 kW); 2 rectangular boilers
- Propulsion: 1 shaft, 1 Horizontal direct-action steam engine
- Speed: 9 knots (17 km/h; 10 mph)
- Complement: 430 officers and crewmen
- Armament: 24 × 60-pounder smoothbore guns (gundeck); 2 × 60-pounder smoothbore guns (upper deck)
- Armor: Belt: 4–4.5 in (102–114 mm); Battery: 4–4.5 in (102–114 mm); Conning tower: 4.5 in (114 mm)

The Pervenets-class ironclads were a group of three armored frigates built for the Imperial Russian Navy in the 1860s. The first ship was built in England because the Russian Empire lacked the ability to build its own ironclads, but the other two were built in Russia. All three ships differed from one another as the design evolved over time. None of the ships ever saw combat and only Kreml had an eventful career, sinking a wooden frigate in an collision in 1869 and sinking herself in 1885. She was refloated and returned to service. They were assigned to the Baltic Fleet upon completion and never left Russian waters. They served with the Gunnery Training Detachment for the bulk of their careers before being reduced to reserve in 1904. They were sold four years later and Pervenets and Ne Tron Menia were converted into coal barges. Pervenets survived World War II and was scrapped in the early 1960s, Ne Tron Menia was sunk during the war and scrapped around 1950, while Kreml's fate after her sale is unknown

== Background ==
The ironclad was developed as a result of the vulnerability of wooden warships to explosive or incendiary shells as demonstrated by the Russian destruction of a Turkish squadron at the Battle of Sinope. The first ironclad battleship, La Gloire, was launched by the French Navy in November 1859. It was followed by the British Warrior-class ironclad. Russia was among the first countries to follow.

== Design ==
The Naval Ministry initially ordered two ships. The first ship in the class, Pervenets (Firstborn), was built in England and the second identical ship, Ne Tron Menia (Don't touch me) in Saint Petersburg. A few months later the decision was made to build a third ship, Kreml (Kremlin), at the Neva shipyards in Saint Petersburg.

The ships were smaller and slower than the contemporary British HMS Warrior and French La Gloire, and were in fact designated "Armored Battery", rather "Armored Frigate", such as the later Admiral Lazarev class. They had the same 114-millimetre (4.5 in) armour as Warrior. Kreml had a few modifications such as a teak layer under the armor and design-planned later upgrade to the 203-millimetre (8 in) guns.

== Ships ==
Construction data
Ship	Builder	Ordered	Construction began	Laid down (Note: In the Russian Imperial Navy, the date the keel was laid down was primarily ceremonial and did not signify an important stage in her construction.)	Launched	Entered service	Fate	Cost (hull and machinery only)
Pervenets	Thames Iron Works, Blackwall, London	18 November 1861 (Note: All dates used in this article are New Style.)		December 1861	18 May 1863	28 July 1864	Scrapped, 1960s	917,000 rubles
Ne Tron Menia	Charles Mitchell Shipyard, St. Petersburg	31 March 1862	30 January 1863	1 December 1863	23 June 1864	18 July 1865	Scrapped, 1950	923,500 rubles
Kreml	Semiannikov & Poletika, St. Petersburg	20 April 1863	2 October 1863	23 December 1863	26 August 1865	1866	Unknown	898,000

== Service history ==
All three ships served in the Baltic Fleet. They never saw any combat action, and gradually transferred from combat ships to training and coastal defence ships. The last ship in the class, Kreml suffered several serious accidents, accidentally scuttling the frigate Orel in 1869. Kreml itself sank due to a storm on 29 May 1885, although she was recovered five days later and returned to service. The last ship of the class, she was scrapped in October 1905.

== See also ==
- List of ironclads of Russia
