= Russian ship of the line Konstantin =

Ship built for the Imperial Russian Navy

History

Russian Empire
- Name: Konstantin
- Builder: Okhta Shipyard, St. Petersburg
- Laid down: 16 December 1835 (Note: All dates used in this article are Old Style)
- Launched: 24 August 1837
- In service: 1839
- Stricken: 8 February 1864

General characteristics (as built)
- Type: 74-gun ship of the line
- Length: 188 ft (57.3 m) (p/p)
- Beam: 50 ft (15.2 m)
- Depth of hold: 19 ft 5 in (5.9 m)
- Armament: 16 × 8-pounder guns; 30 × short 24-pounder guns; 6 × 24-pounder carronades; 24 × short 36-pounder guns; 4 × 60-pounder licornes

General characteristics (rebuilt as a steamer)
- Displacement: 3,814 long tons (3,875 t)
- Length: 215 ft (65.5 m) (p/p)
- Beam: 51 ft 6 in (15.7 m)
- Draft: 23 ft (7.0 m)
- Installed power: 450 Nominal horsepower
- Propulsion: 1 Steam engine
- Speed: 10.5 knots (19.4 km/h; 12.1 mph)
- Armament: 20 × short 24-pounder guns; 14 × 30-pounder carronades; 2 × short 30-pounder guns; 6 × long 30-pounder guns; 1 × 36-pounder gunnade; 4 × 60-pounder licornes; 26 × 68-pounder shell guns; 1 × 9.65-inch (245 mm) shell gun

Konstantin (Russian: Константин) was a 74-gun Fershampenuaz-class ship of the line built for the Imperial Russian Navy in the mid-1830s. The ship was assigned to the Baltic Fleet for her entire career. She was one of the ships deployed to Denmark during the First Schleswig War of 1848–1850 to help preserve Denmark's territorial integrity against Prussia. The ship was converted to steam power in 1852–1854 and cruised the Baltic Sea in 1857–1860 before she was placed in ordinary. Konstantin was stricken from the navy list in 1864 and sold for scrap.

== Description ==
Konstantin was 188 feet (57.3 m) long between perpendiculars, with a beam of 50 feet (15.2 m) and a depth of hold of 19 feet 5 inches (5.9 m). As built she was armed with a variety of smoothbore guns: On the forecastle and quarterdeck, the ship was fitted with either 16 eight-pounder guns and six 24-pounder carronades or twenty 24-pounder carronades. On her upper deck, she carried 30 short 24-pounder guns and, on her lower deck, Konstantin was fitted with 24 short 36-pounder guns and four 60-pounder licornes. Her crew numbered 669 officers and enlisted men.

In 1852–1854, Konstantin was rebuilt and converted to steam with a British-built Humphrys & Tennant steam engine of 450 nominal horsepower that drove a single propeller shaft. She had a maximum speed of 10.5 knots (19.4 km/h; 12.1 mph). Enlarged to accommodate the steam engine and its boilers, she displaced 3,697 long tons (3,756 t) and the ship measured 2,631 tons burthen. She now measured 215 feet (65.5 m) between perpendiculars and her beam was increased to 51 feet 6 inches (15.7 m). Forward her draft measured 21 feet 6 inches (6.6 m) and 23 feet (7.0 m) aft. Konstantin was also rearmed when her reconstruction was complete. The ship now carried one 9.65-inch (245 mm) shell gun, one 36-pounder gunnade, fourteen 30-pounder carronades, and two short 30-pounder guns on her quarterdeck and forecastle. On her upper deck, the ship carried four long 30-pounders, 20 short 24-pounder guns, and four 60-pounder licornes. The armament of her lower deck consisted of twenty-six 68-pounder shell guns and two long 30-pounder guns

== Career ==
Konstantin was laid down on 16 December 1835 at the Okhta Shipyard in St. Petersburg. The ship was launched on 24 August 1837 and cruised the Baltic in 1839–1847. She sailed to Denmark, along with most of the Baltic Fleet, to show the flag during the First Schleswig War between Denmark, Sweden and Prussia. Tsar Nicholas I was determined to support the integrity of Denmark so he deployed a large force in Danish waters for the duration of the war, although it did not actively participate in the war.

Konstantin was rebuilt as a screw ship of the line between 1852 and 1854. She transported troops from Sveaborg to Kronstadt in 1856. The ship cruised the Baltic for the next three years before she was laid up. The ship was stricken from the naval list on 8 February 1864 and subsequently scrapped.
