= Russian corvette Vityaz (1862) =

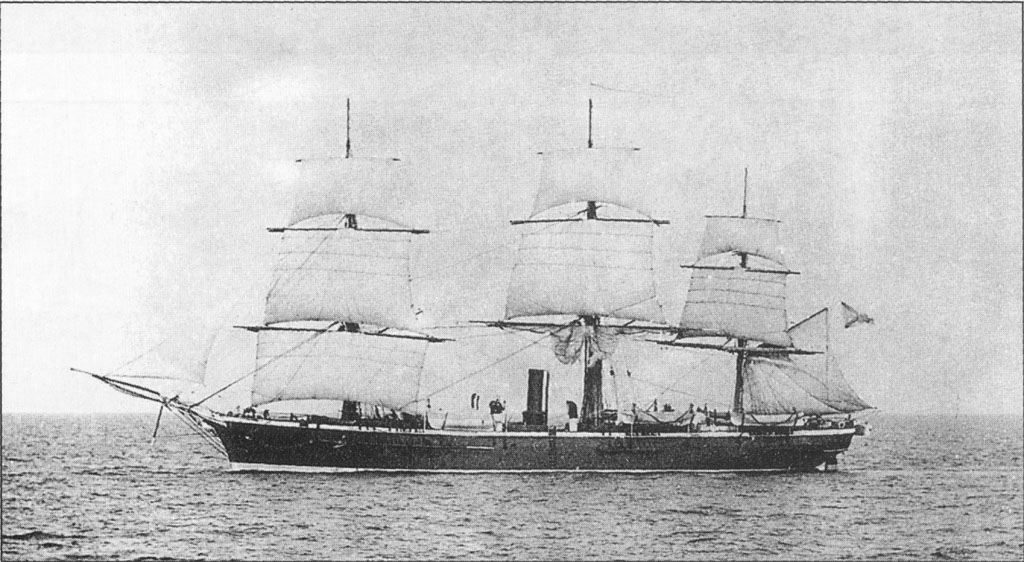
- Russian corvette Vityaz

History

Russia
- Name: Vityaz (1862–1882)
- Namesake: Slavic folk character, Mikhail Skobelev
- Laid down: August 23, 1861
- Launched: July 24, 1862
- Decommissioned: 1895
- Renamed: Skobelev (1882–1892)
- Fate: Scrapped in 1895

General characteristics
- Class & type: Bogatyr-class steam corvette
- Displacement: 2,156 tons
- Length: 66.3 m (217 ft 6 in)
- Beam: 12 m (39 ft 4 in)
- Draft: 5.3 m (17 ft 5 in)
- Propulsion: Steam engines, sails
- Speed: 11–12 knots (20–22 km/h; 13–14 mph)
- Armament: 17 × 60-pounder smoothbore cannons (1862–1870); 12 × rifled guns (1870-1895)

Vityaz (Russian: Витязь, translit. Vityaz) was a steam corvette of the Baltic Fleet of the Imperial Russian Navy. Later renamed Skobelev, Vityaz spent much of its career as an oceanographic research vessel, completing two circumnavigations of the world in this capacity.

== Construction and design ==
The ship was laid down on August 23, 1861, and it was launched on July 24, 1862. Vityaz was built at Pori in the Grand Duchy of Finland, at the time a part of the Russian Empire.

Vityaz was one of four sail-screw corvettes of the Bogatyr class, equipped with 17 guns and displacing 2,156 tons. Equipped with a 160 nominal horsepower/1,618 ihp (1,207 kW) steam engine built by the Belgian company John Cockerill, Vityaz was capable of a speed of 12 knots (22 km/h; 14 mph).

At launch the corvette was armed with one No. 1 and 16 No. 2 model 1855 cannons (ru). These 60-pounder smoothbore cannons were developed by the Russian artillery general N.A. Baumgart (ru) and adopted by the Imperial Russian Navy in 1855. By 1870, the original guns had been replaced with newer rifled guns, including five 1867-model 6-inch guns, four 1867-model 9-pounder cannons, and three rapid fire guns.

== Service ==
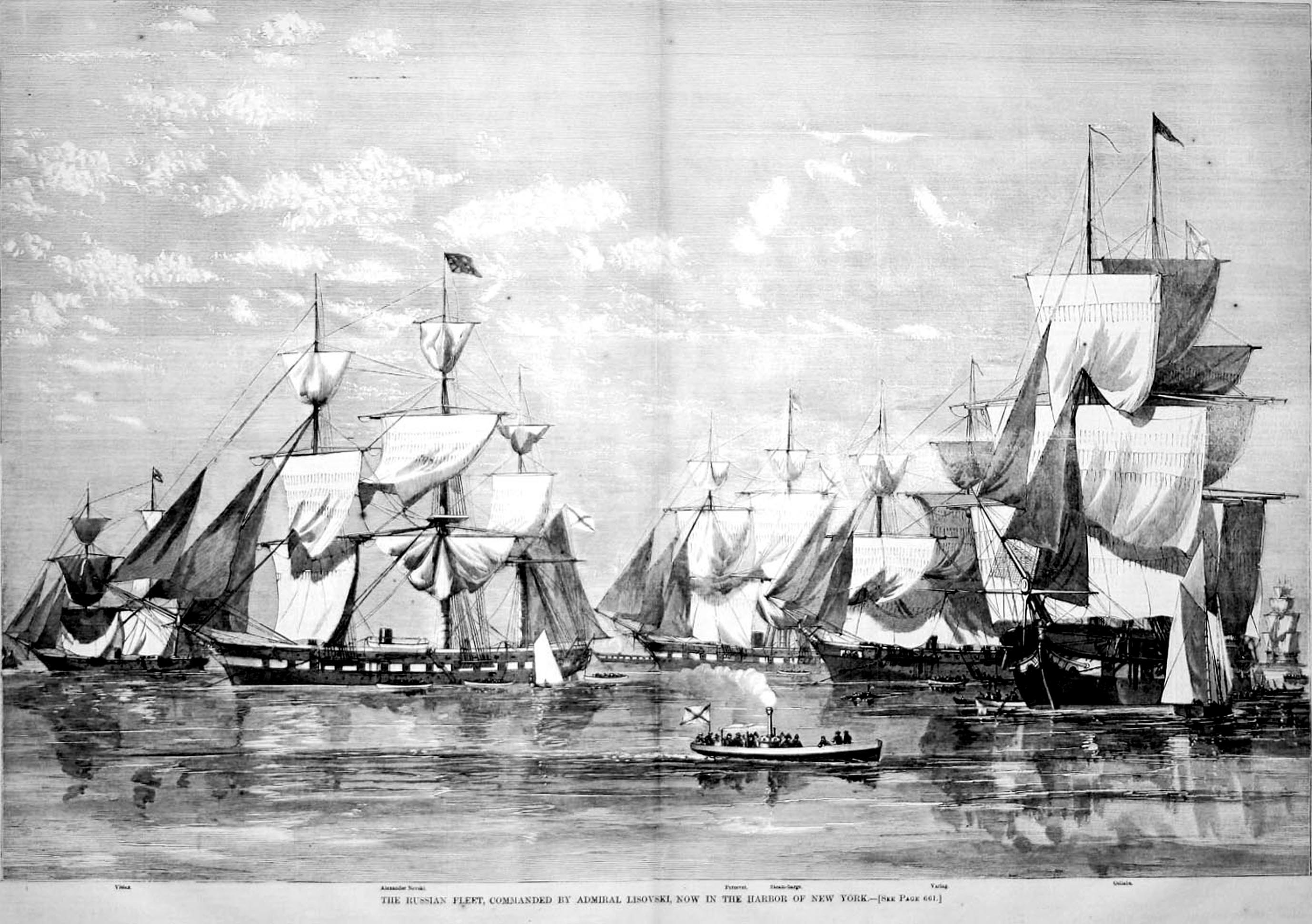
The Russian Fleet, Commanded by Admiral Lisovski, Now in New York Harbor

In 1863 and 1864, Vityaz participated in an expedition to North America as part of the squadron of Rear Admiral S.S. Lesovsky (ru).

In 1869, Vityaz supported oceanographic research by Stepan Makarov in the Sea of Marmara and the Mediterranean Sea.

Vityaz circumnavigated the world from 1870 to 1874 under the command of Captain P.N. Nazimov (ru). Sailing from St. Petersburg on a survey mission, Vityaz crossed the Atlantic Ocean and passed through the Strait of Magellan, accompanied by the ethnologist Nicholas Miklouho-Maclay. A planned stop at Rapa Nui was cancelled due to political instability, but the Vityaz did stop at Mangareva from July 7–12, 1871, during which time Miklouho-Maclay spoke to Rapa Nui natives about their island. On September 20, 1871, Vityaz deposited Miklouho-Maclay at Astrolabe Bay on New Guinea, where he remained conducting research work for fifteen months. On 30 August 1863, Vityaz rescued all on board the German barque Charlotte Christine, which had been wrecked whilst on a voyage from Vladivostok, Russia to Chefoo, China. Vityaz explored the strait between Long Island and New Guinea, which as a result was named the Vitiaz Strait. After stops in Japan, China, India, and the Arabian Peninsula, Vityaz passed through the Suez Canal, the Strait of Gibraltar, and the English Channel and returned to Kronstadt.

Vityaz was overhauled at Kronstadt in 1874 and again in 1881. In 1877, Lieutenant Commander P. A. Bolotnikov (ru) was appointed commander of the corvette.

On June 27, 1882, the corvette was renamed Skobelev in honor of Mikhail Skobelev, a Russian general who had died that year.

From 1883 to 1885, Skobelev, now under the command of Captain V.V. Blagodarev (ru), made a second circumnavigation. During this voyage, Skobelev transferred Miklouho-Maclay from Batavia to New Guinea.

Scholars have argued that both of these voyages, which were supported by the Imperial Russian Geographical Society and the Russian naval ministry, were aimed at establishing Russian colonies in the Pacific, although nothing came of any such plans. The 1870s expedition contributed to fears from British settlers in New Zealand that Russia might attack the colony, while the appearance of Russian ships in the area in 1883 contributed to the United Kingdom, Germany, and the Netherlands partitioning New Guinea.

In February 1892, Skobelev was converted into a training ship. In 1895, it was removed from the Russian navy and scrapped.

== Legacy ==
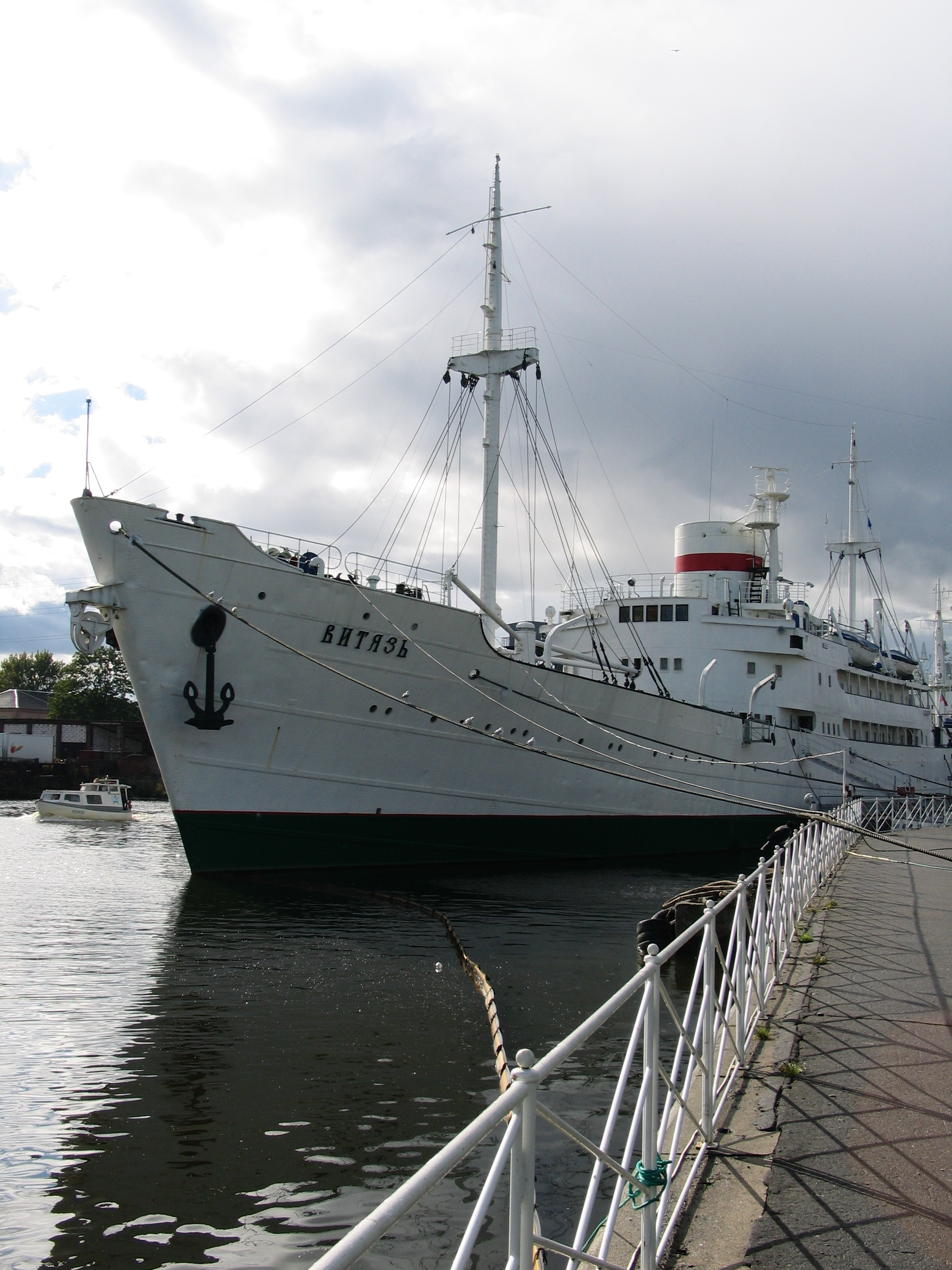
Soviet research vessel Vityaz docked at the Museum of the World Ocean in Kaliningrad

A second steam corvette of the Russian navy named Vityaz (ru) launched in 1883, when the older vessel remained in operation as Skobelev. This corvette also served as a research ship. The name was later assigned to a Bogatyr-class cruiser that was destroyed by fire while under construction in 1901. The Soviet research ship RV Vityaz, active from 1946 to 1979 and since preserved as a museum ship, was named in honor of both the 1862 and 1884 vessels. A second Soviet research ship named Vityaz operated from 1981 to 1992.

During construction of the Oceanographic Museum of Monaco, Prince Albert I personally selected 20 noteworthy oceanographic research vessels to be inscribed on the new building's frieze. Vityaz, transliterated as "Vitiaz", was included on the basis of its two circumnavigatory expeditions.

In 1971, a new theater named Vityaz opened on Miklouho-Maclay Street of Moscow, named to commemorate the ethnographer's ship. This theater closed in 2018 and was demolished so a shopping center could be built on the site.

In 1987, Papua New Guinea issued a stamp depicting Vityaz, part of a series of stamps featuring sailing vessels of significance to the country's history.
