= Russian battleship Poltava (1894) =

Petropavlovsk-class battleship

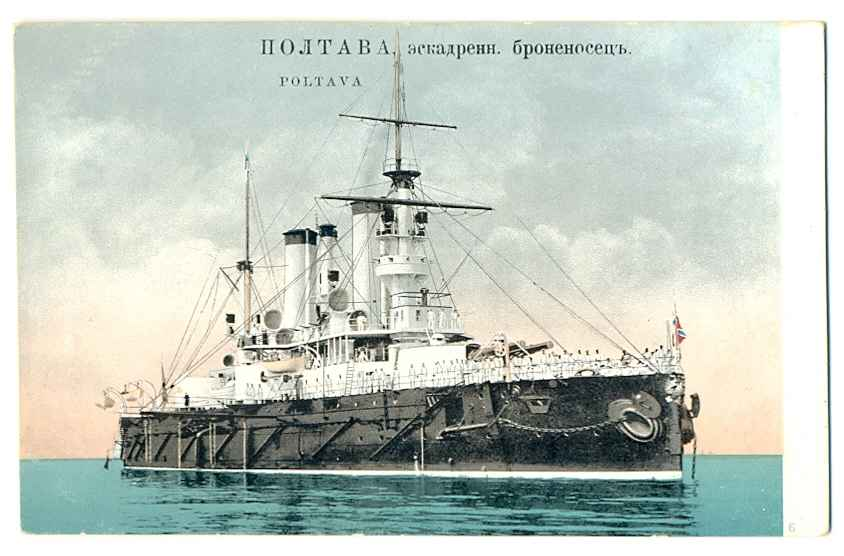
- Swedish postcard of Poltava

History

Russian Empire
- Name: Poltava
- Namesake: Battle of Poltava
- Builder: New Admiralty Shipyard
- Laid down: 19 May 1892 (Note: All dates used in this article are New Style)
- Launched: 6 November 1894
- In service: 1899
- Captured: January 1905 by the Japanese after the siege of Port Arthur

Empire of Japan
- Name: Tango
- Namesake: Tango Province
- Acquired: January 1905
- Commissioned: 22 August 1905
- Fate: Sold to Russia, 3 or 4 April 1916

Russian Empire
- Name: Chesma
- Namesake: Battle of Chesma
- Acquired: Bought, 4 April 1916
- Renamed: Chesma in 1916
- Fate: Taken over by the Bolsheviks, October 1917

Soviet Union
- Name: Chesma
- Acquired: October 1917
- Stricken: 3 July 1924
- Captured: By the British, March 1919; Recaptured by the Soviets, October 1919
- Fate: Scrapped, 1924

General characteristics
- Class & type: Petropavlovsk-class battleship
- Displacement: 11,500 long tons (11,685 t)
- Length: 376 ft (114.6 m)
- Beam: 70 ft (21.3 m)
- Draft: 28 ft 3 in (8.6 m)
- Installed power: 14 cylindrical boilers; 10,600 ihp (7,900 kW)
- Propulsion: 2 shafts; 2 triple-expansion steam engines
- Speed: 16 knots (30 km/h; 18 mph)
- Range: 3,750 nmi (6,940 km; 4,320 mi) at 10 knots (19 km/h; 12 mph)
- Complement: 631–652
- Armament: 2 × twin 12 in (305 mm) guns; 4 × twin, 4 × single 6 in (152 mm) guns; 10 × single 47 mm (1.9 in) guns; 28 × single 37 mm (1.5 in) guns; 4 × 15-inch (381 mm) torpedo tubes; 2 × 18-inch (457 mm) torpedo tubes; 50 × mines
- Armor: Krupp armor; Waterline belt: 12–14.5 in (305–368 mm); Main Gun turrets: 10 in (254 mm); Deck: 2–3 in (51–76 mm)

The Russian battleship Poltava (Russian: Полтава) was one of three Petropavlovsk-class battleships built for the Imperial Russian Navy in the 1890s. The ship was transferred to the Pacific Squadron shortly after completion and based at Port Arthur from 1901. During the Russo-Japanese War of 1904–1905, she participated in the Battle of Port Arthur and was heavily damaged during the Battle of the Yellow Sea. She was sunk by Japanese artillery during the subsequent siege of Port Arthur in December 1904, but was raised by the Imperial Japanese Navy (IJN) after the war and renamed Tango (Japanese: 丹後).

During World War I, she bombarded German fortifications during the siege of Qingdao. The Japanese government sold Tango back to the Russians at their request in 1916. She was renamed Chesma (Чесма) as her former name had been given to a new ship. En route to the White Sea, she joined an Allied force that persuaded the Greek government to disarm their ships. Her crew declared for the Bolsheviks in October 1917, but made no effort to resist when the British captured her during the North Russia intervention in early 1918. In poor condition, the ship was used as a prison hulk. Abandoned by the British when they withdrew in 1919 and recaptured by the Bolsheviks, she was scrapped in 1924.

== Design and description ==
The design of the Petropavlovsk class was derived from the battleship Imperator Nikolai I, but was greatly enlarged to accommodate an armament of four 12-inch (305 mm) and eight 8-inch (203 mm) guns. While under construction their armament was revised to consist of more powerful 12-inch guns and the 8-inch guns were replaced by a dozen 6-inch (152 mm) guns. The ships were 376 feet (114.6 m) long overall, with a beam of 70 feet (21.3 m) and a draft of 28 feet 3 inches (8.6 m). Designed to displace 10,960 long tons (11,140 t), Poltava was over 500 long tons (510 t) overweight and displaced 11,500 long tons (11,700 t) when completed. The ship was powered by two vertical triple-expansion steam engines, built by the British firm Humphrys, Tennant and Dykes, each driving one shaft, using steam generated by 14 cylindrical boilers. The engines were rated at 10,600 indicated horsepower (7,900 kW) and designed to reach a top speed of 16 knots (30 km/h; 18 mph), but Poltava reached a speed of 16.29 knots (30.17 km/h; 18.75 mph) from 11,213 indicated horsepower (8,362 kW) during her sea trials. She carried enough coal to give her a range of 3,750 nautical miles (6,940 km; 4,320 mi) at a speed of 10 knots (19 km/h; 12 mph). Her crew consisted of 26–27 officers and 605–625 enlisted men.

The Petropavlovsk-class ships' main battery consisted of four 12-inch guns mounted in two twin-gun turrets, one forward and one aft of the superstructure. Designed to fire one round per 90 seconds, the actual rate of fire was half that. Their secondary armament consisted of twelve Canet six-inch quick-firing (QF) guns. Eight of these were mounted in four twin-gun wing turrets and the remaining guns were positioned in unprotected embrasures on the sides of the hull amidships. Smaller guns were carried for defense against torpedo boats, including a dozen QF 47-millimeter (1.9 in) Hotchkiss guns and twenty-eight Maxim QF 37-millimeter (1.5 in) guns. They were also armed with six torpedo tubes, four 15-inch (381 mm) tubes above water and two 18-inch (457 mm) submerged tubes, all mounted on the broadside. They carried 50 mines to be used to protect her anchorage.

Poltava was the first Russian battleship to use Krupp cemented armor, imported from Germany. Her waterline armor belt was 12–14.5 inches (305–368 mm) thick. The Krupp armor of her main gun turrets had a maximum thickness of 10 inches (254 mm) and the nickel-steel armor of her protective decks ranged from 2 to 3 inches (51 to 76 mm) in thickness.

== Construction and service ==
Poltava was named for the victory at the 1709 Battle of Poltava when Peter the Great defeated King Charles XII of Sweden. Delayed by shortages of skilled workmen, design changes and late delivery of the main armament, the ship was under construction for six years. She was laid down on 19 May 1892, together with her two sister ships, at the New Admiralty Shipyard and launched on 6 November 1894. Her trials lasted from 1898 to 1899 and she was then briefly assigned to the Baltic Fleet. Together with her sister ship Sevastopol, Poltava had a radio installed in September 1900, the first ships in the Imperial Russian Navy to get such equipment. On 15 October the sisters set sail for Port Arthur and later had to unload much of their ammunition, coal and other stores to reduce their drafts enough to pass through the Suez Canal. Poltava arrived at Port Arthur on 12 April 1901, the day before her sister.

=== Battle of Port Arthur ===
After the Japanese victory in the First Sino-Japanese War of 1894–1895, both Russia and Japan had ambitions to control Manchuria and Korea, resulting in tensions between the two nations. Japan had begun negotiations to reduce the tensions in 1901, but the Russian government was slow and uncertain in its replies because it had not yet decided exactly how to resolve the problems. Japan interpreted this as deliberate prevarication designed to buy time to complete the Russian armament programs. The situation was worsened by Russia's failure to withdraw its troops from Manchuria in October 1903 as promised. The final straws were the news of Russian timber concessions in northern Korea and the Russian refusal to acknowledge Japanese interests in Manchuria while continuing to place conditions on Japanese activities in Korea. These actions caused the Japanese government to decide in December 1903 that war was inevitable. As tensions with Japan increased, the Pacific Squadron began mooring in the outer harbor at night in order to react more quickly to any Japanese attempt to land troops in Korea.

On the night of 8/9 February 1904, the IJN launched a surprise attack on the Russian fleet at Port Arthur. Poltava was not hit by the initial attack by torpedo boats and sortied the following morning when the Combined Fleet, commanded by Vice Admiral Tōgō Heihachirō, attacked. Tōgō had expected the surprise night attack by his ships to be much more successful than it was, anticipating that the Russians would be badly disorganized and weakened, but they had recovered from their surprise and were ready for his attack. The Japanese ships were spotted by the protected cruiser Boyarin, which was patrolling offshore and alerted the Russian defenses. Tōgō chose to attack the Russian coastal defenses with his main armament and engage the ships with his secondary guns. Splitting his fire proved to be a poor decision as the Japanese eight-inch (203 mm) and six-inch guns inflicted little damage on the Russian ships, which concentrated all their fire on the Japanese ships with some effect. Poltava was hit several times with little effect and only three men wounded. She fired 12 twelve-inch and 55 six-inch shells during the battle.

Poltava participated in the action of 13 April, when Tōgō successfully lured out a portion of the Pacific Squadron, including Vice Admiral Stepan Makarov's flagship, her sister Petropavlovsk. When Makarov spotted the five Japanese battleships, he turned back for Port Arthur and his flagship struck a minefield laid by the Japanese the previous night. The ship sank in less than two minutes after one of her magazines exploded, and Makarov was one of the 677 killed. Emboldened by his success, Tōgō resumed long-range bombardment missions, prompting the Russians to lay more minefields, which sank two of his battleships the following month.

Rear Admiral Wilgelm Vitgeft became the new commander of the First Pacific Squadron and led a half-hearted attempt to reach Vladivostok on 23 June; intercepted by the Combined Fleet, he returned to Port Arthur without engaging the Japanese ships. Poltava, together with cruisers and destroyers, sortied to bombard Japanese coast defense positions on 9 July and briefly engaged Japanese ships that intercepted her. During the summer, the ship landed many of her 47 mm and 37 mm guns to reinforce the defenses of the port.

=== Battle of the Yellow Sea ===
On 10 August the Imperial Japanese Army, which had been slowly pushing south to Port Arthur, began an assault on the city's outer defenses. With their base now directly under attack, the First Pacific Squadron sortied in the morning, around 07:00, in an attempt to escape to Vladivostok. The Japanese fleet intercepted the Russian ships at 12:55 in what became the Battle of the Yellow Sea.

Poltava was sixth in the column of Russian ships when the Japanese engaged them, and from her position started to bombard Asahi at around 14:45. The battleship Mikasa, the Japanese flagship, then fired several shots that hit Poltava, causing the Russian squadron to drop back to support her. The Russians scored several hits on Mikasa, including two by Poltava. She also scored one hit on the armored cruiser Nisshin. Owing to the damage Mikasa had sustained, the Japanese fleet broke off the attack at around 15:20 and turned to starboard, opening the range. By 17:35 the Japanese were again closing on the Russian rear. Mikasa and three other battleships opened fire on Poltava and three armored cruisers, but problems with their turrets forced the Japanese battleships to break off the engagement. They returned at 18:30, with Shikishima and Asahi firing on Poltava. As the Russian fleet began to slip away, two 12-inch shells from Asahi penetrated the conning tower of the Russian flagship Tsesarevich, killing Vitgeft and the helmsman, severely wounding the captain, and causing the ship to come to a dead stop after executing a sharp turn. Thinking that this was a maneuver planned by Vitgeft, the Russian line started to execute the same turn, causing all of the ships directly behind Tsesarevich, including Poltava, to maneuver wildly to avoid hitting the stationary flagship. Rear Admiral Prince Pavel Ukhtomsky, second in command of the squadron, signaled the other Russian ships to steam back to Port Arthur. The signal flags were only gradually recognized by Pobeda, Sevastopol, Pallada and Poltava and the other vessels took some time to re-form for the return voyage. Poltava was hit by 12 to 14 large-caliber shells during the battle that knocked out five of her 6-inch guns, as well as killing 12 crewmen and wounding 43. Poltava, along with Tsesarevich and Peresvet, sustained hits at the waterline that crippled their maneuverability, preventing the Russian squadron from fleeing to Vladivostok.

=== Siege of Port Arthur ===
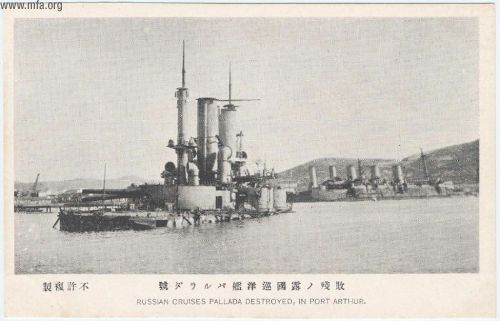
Japanese postcard showing Poltava (incorrectly identified as Pallada) partially submerged at Port Arthur

Returning to Port Arthur on 11 August, the Russian squadron found the city still under siege by the Japanese Third Army led by Baron Nogi Maresuke. Poltava was hit on 18 August by four 4.7-inch (120 mm) shells, fired by a battery, that wounded six men. The new squadron commander, Rear Admiral Robert N. Viren, believed in reinforcing the landward defenses of the port and continued to strip guns, and sailors to man them, from his ships. By September Poltava had lost a total of three 6-inch, four 47 mm and twenty-six 37 mm guns. That same month, she began bombarding Japanese positions; through November she fired one hundred ten 12-inch shells and an unknown number of 6-inch shells.

In October the advancing Third Army began to bombard the harbor with 28-centimeter (11 in) siege howitzers, firing at random. They hit Poltava twice on 7 October, though the shells only started fires. On 5 December the Japanese captured 203 Meter Hill, a crucial position that overlooked the harbor and allowed them to direct their artillery at the Russian ships. Poltava was hit that same day by five shells, three of which penetrated the deck. One hit a torpedo room, and another burst in the aft 47 mm magazine. That started a fire that could not be put out because the flooding system had been previously damaged and eventually ignited propellant charges in the adjacent 12-inch magazine. About a half-hour after the hit, the magazine exploded and blew a hole in the ship's bottom that caused her to sink 45 minutes later in the shallow water.

=== Japanese career ===
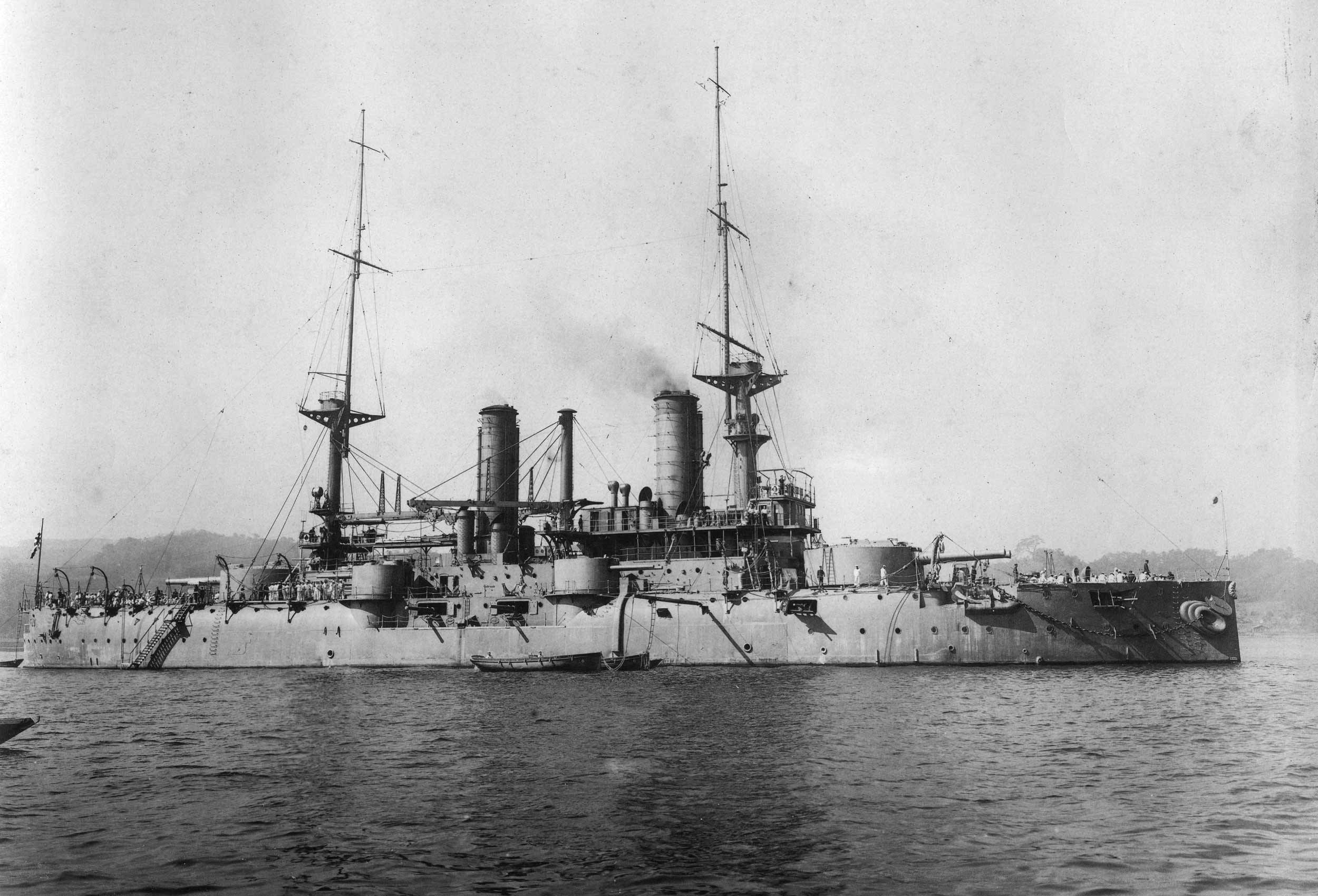
Tango at anchor around 1909

Following the capitulation of Port Arthur in January 1905, Japanese engineers refloated Poltava on 22 July, and commissioned her as Tango a month later, taking her name from the ancient Japanese province of Tango, now a part of Kyoto Prefecture. Classified as a 1st class battleship, she departed for Maizuru Naval Arsenal two days later and arrived on 29 August. Except for participating in the review of captured ships on 23 October 1905, she remained there under repair until November 1907. Tango then sailed to Yokosuka Naval Arsenal to complete fitting out.

The IJN made several changes to the ship as she was repaired. Her fighting top was removed and her boilers were replaced by 16 Miyabara water-tube boilers. She retained her main guns, but their breeches were replaced by Japanese-built ones. Her secondary armament of eight 152 mm guns in twin turrets were retained, while her four casemated 152 mm guns were replaced by six Japanese-built 15 cm/45 41st Year Type guns; her light armament was revised to ten QF 12-pounder 12 cwt (Note: "Cwt" is the abbreviation for hundredweight, 12 cwt referring to the weight of the gun.) and four 37 mm guns. Four 18-inch above-water torpedo tubes replaced her original torpedo armament. Her crew now numbered 668 officers and crewmen.

Tango joined the fleet in 1911 and was re-classified as a 1st class coast defense ship in 1912. In 1913 she participated in the annual fleet maneuvers as part of the "enemy" force. She was assigned to the 2nd Squadron, commanded by Vice Admiral Kato Sadakichi, shortly after World War I began. The squadron was tasked to blockade the German-owned port of Qingdao, China, and to cooperate with the Imperial Japanese Army in capturing the city. Tango and the other ships of the squadron bombarded German fortifications throughout the siege until the Germans surrendered on 7 November.

=== Return to Russia ===
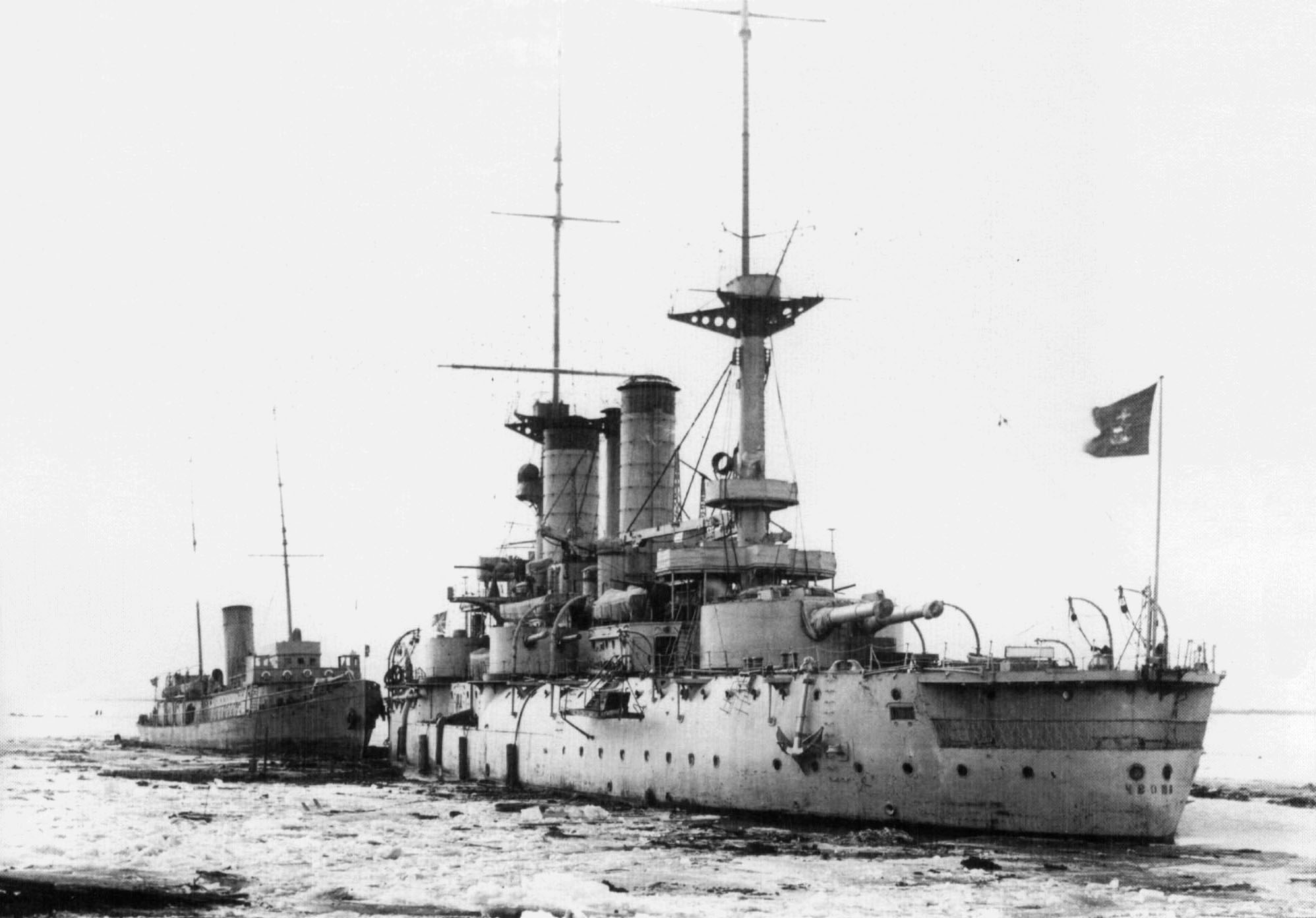
Chesma at anchor in the White Sea, 1921

In 1916 the Russian government decided to reinforce its naval strength outside the Baltic and Black Seas. As Japan and Russia were allies during the war, the Japanese government sold Tango and some other ex-Russian warships back to Russia in March. The battleship arrived at Vladivostok on 2 April and was turned over to the Russians on either 3 or 4 April. Her former name had been given to the new dreadnought battleship Poltava, so Tango was renamed Chesma, after the 1770 Battle of Chesma. She departed Vladivostok on 2 July and arrived at Port Said, Egypt, on 19 September.

Chesma joined the Allied fleet off Salamis demanding the disarmament of the Greek fleet later that month and departed after the Greeks agreed to meet the Allied demands. Her machinery was overhauled at Birkenhead by Cammell Laird, beginning on 5 December, and her main deck six-inch and 12-pounder guns were replaced. In exchange she received four anti-aircraft guns mounted on her superstructure. She arrived at Aleksandrovsk, a port in the Murmansk Oblast, on 16 January 1917 and the political situation became very confused with the February Revolution shortly after her arrival. She was assigned to the White Sea Fleet on 3 February. Her crew declared for the Bolsheviks in October, but made no effort to interfere with the Allied landing at Murmansk in March 1918. Although the ship was deemed "aground and unseaworthy" by the British shortly afterwards, they seized the ship and used her as a floating prison in April 1919 to house 40 Bolshevik prisoners of war. After the British withdrew, the abandoned ship was captured by the Red Army in March 1920 and incorporated into the Bolshevik White Sea Military Flotilla on 24 April. No longer of any military value, she was turned over to the port of Arkhangelsk on 16 June 1921 and stricken from the list of naval vessels on 3 July 1924, after which she was scrapped.
