= Russian battleship Pobeda =

Peresvet-class battleship

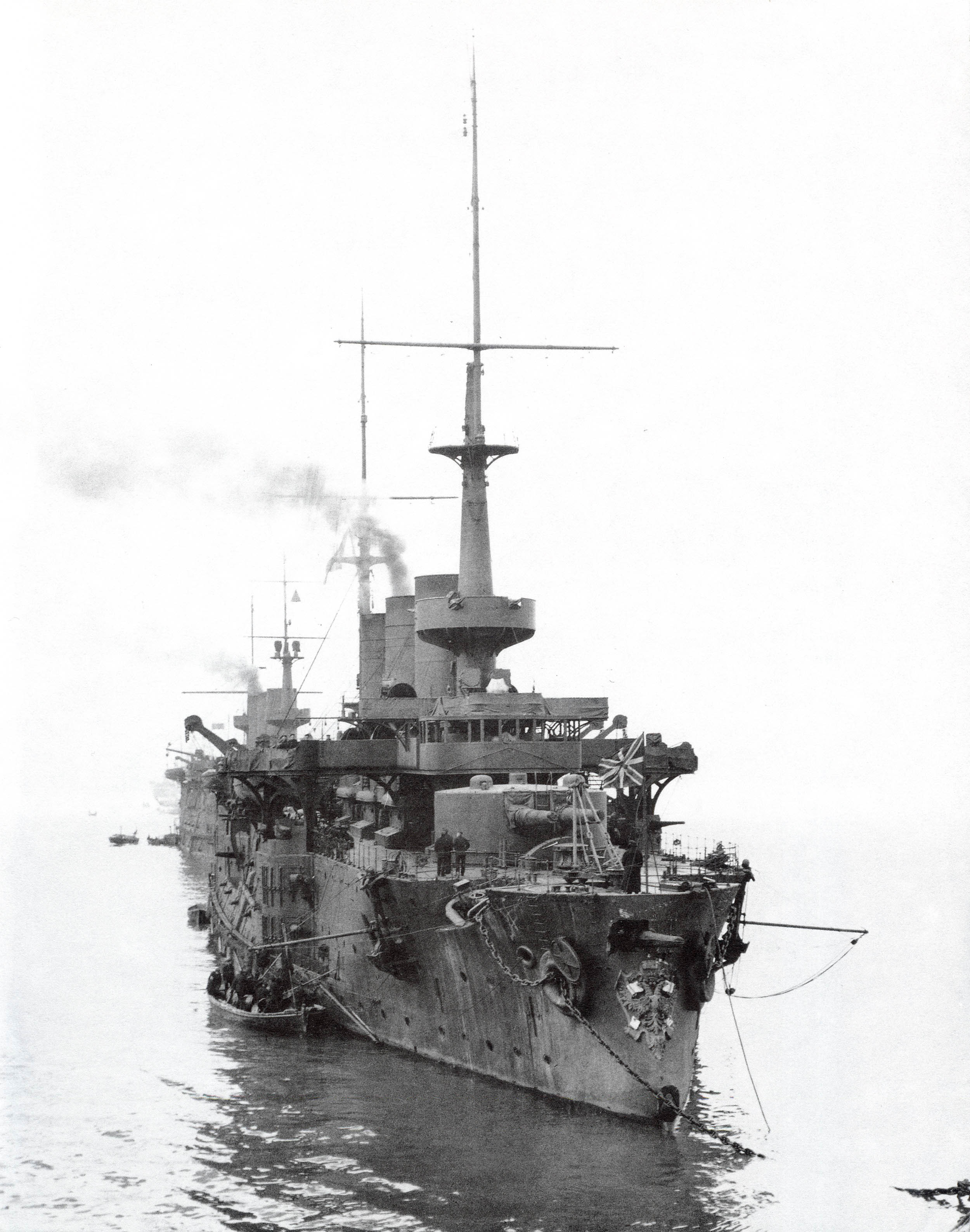
- Pobeda at anchor, probably about March 1904

History

Russian Empire
- Name: Pobeda
- Namesake: Victory
- Ordered: 26 April 1898 (Note: All dates used in this article are New Style.)
- Builder: Baltic Works, Saint Petersburg, Russia
- Cost: 10,050,000 rubles
- Laid down: 21 February 1899
- Launched: 10 May 1900
- In service: October 1902
- Fate: Sunk, 7 December 1904

Japan
- Name: Suwo
- Namesake: Suō Province
- Acquired: Refloated, 17 October 1905
- Commissioned: October 1908
- Stricken: 1922
- Fate: Believed scrapped, 1922–23

General characteristics
- Class & type: Peresvet-class pre-dreadnought battleship
- Displacement: 13,320 long tons (13,534 t)
- Length: 434 ft 5 in (132.4 m)
- Draft: 26 ft 3 in (8 m)
- Installed power: 30 Belleville boilers; 14,500 ihp (10,813 kW)
- Propulsion: 3 shafts; 3 triple-expansion steam engines
- Speed: 18 knots (33 km/h; 21 mph)
- Range: 6,200 nmi (11,500 km; 7,100 mi) at 10 knots (19 km/h; 12 mph)
- Complement: 27 officers, 744 men
- Armament: As built: 2 × twin 10 in (254 mm) guns 11 × single 6 in (152 mm) guns 20 × single 75 mm (3 in) guns 20 × single 47 mm (1.9 in) guns 8 × single 37 mm (1.5 in) guns 5 × 15 in (381 mm) torpedo tubes 45 mines As Sowu: 2 × twin 10 in guns 10 × single 6 in guns 16 × single 12 pdr (3 in (76 mm)) guns 2 × 18 in (450 mm) torpedo tubes
- Armor: Belt: 4–9 inches (102–229 mm); Deck: 2–3 inches (51–76 mm); Turrets: 9 inches (229 mm)

Pobeda (Russian: Победа, lit. 'Victory') was the last of the three Peresvet-class pre-dreadnought battleships built for the Imperial Russian Navy at the end of the nineteenth century. The ship was assigned to the Pacific Squadron upon completion and based at Port Arthur from 1903. During the Russo-Japanese War of 1904–1905, she participated in the battles of Port Arthur and the Yellow Sea. Having escaped serious damage in these engagements, Pobeda was sunk by gunfire during the siege of Port Arthur, and then salvaged by the Japanese and placed into service under the name Suwo (周防).

Rearmed and re-boilered by the Japanese, Suwo was reclassified by the Imperial Japanese Navy (IJN) as a coastal defense ship in 1908 and served as a training ship for several years. She was the flagship of the Japanese squadron that participated in the siege of Qingdao at the beginning of World War I and continued in that role until she became a gunnery training ship in 1917. The ship was disarmed in 1922 to comply with the terms of the Washington Naval Treaty and believed to have been scrapped around that time.

== Design and description ==
The design of the Peresvet class was inspired by the British second-class battleships (typically faster, but with thinner armor and smaller guns than first-class battleships) of the Centurion class. The British ships were intended to defeat commerce-raiding armored cruisers like the Russian ships Rossia and Rurik, and the Peresvet class was designed to support the armored cruisers. This role placed a premium on high speed and long range at the expense of heavy armament and armor.

Pobeda was 434 feet 5 inches (132.4 m) long overall, had a beam of 71 feet 6 inches (21.79 m) and a draft of 26 feet 3 inches (8 m). Designed to displace 12,674 long tons (12,877 t), she was almost 600 long tons (610 t) overweight and displaced 13,320 long tons (13,530 t). Her crew consisted of 27 officers and 744 enlisted men. The ship was powered by three vertical triple-expansion steam engines using steam generated by 30 Belleville boilers. The engines were rated at 14,500 indicated horsepower (10,800 kW), using forced draught, and designed to reach a top speed of 18 knots (33 km/h; 21 mph). Pobeda, however, reached a top speed of 18.5 knots (34.3 km/h; 21.3 mph) from 15,578 indicated horsepower (11,617 kW) during her sea trials in October 1901. She carried a maximum of 2,060 long tons (2,090 t) of coal, which allowed her to steam for 6,200 nautical miles (11,500 km; 7,100 mi) at a speed of 10 knots (19 km/h; 12 mph).

The ship's main battery consisted of four 10-inch (254 mm) guns mounted in two twin-gun turrets, one forward and one aft of the superstructure. The secondary armament consisted of eleven Canet 6-inch (152 mm) quick-firing (QF) guns, mounted in casemates on the sides of the hull and in the bow, underneath the forecastle. Smaller guns were carried for defense against torpedo boats. These included twenty 75-millimeter (3 in) QF guns, twenty 47-millimeter (1.9 in) Hotchkiss guns and eight 37-millimeter (1.5 in) guns. She was also armed with five 15-inch (381 mm) torpedo tubes, three above water and two submerged. The ship carried 45 mines to be used to protect her anchorage. Pobeda's waterline armor belt consisted of Krupp cemented armor and was 4–9 inches (102–229 mm) thick. The armor of her gun turrets had a maximum thickness of 9 inches and her deck ranged from 2 to 3 inches (51 to 76 mm) in thickness.

== Construction and service ==
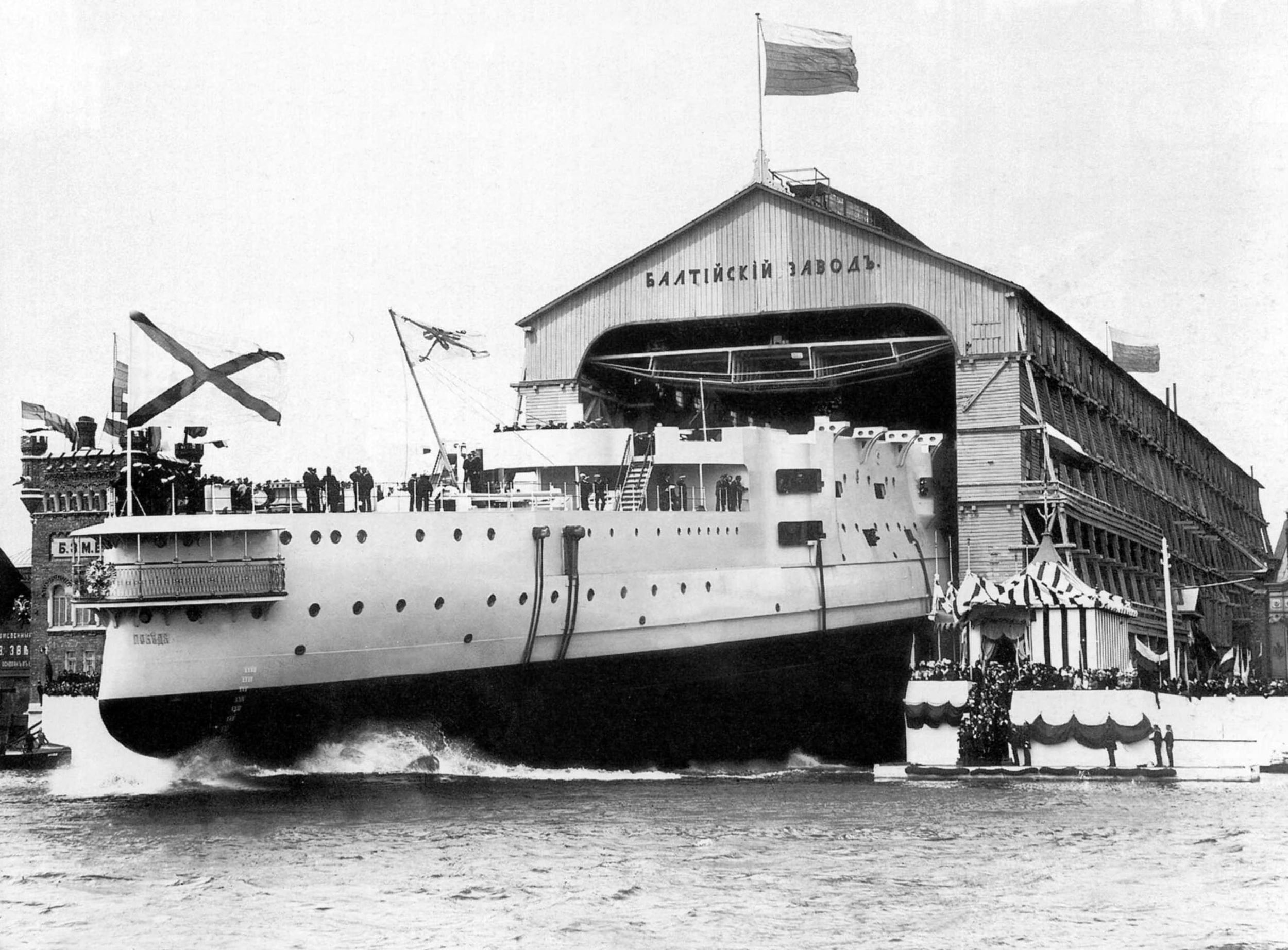
Launch of Pobeda at Baltic Shipyard, 10 May 1900

Pobeda (Victory) was ordered on 26 April 1898 from the Baltic Works and construction began on 30 May 1898 at the company's Saint Petersburg shipyard, well before the formal keel-laying ceremony on 21 February 1899. The ship was launched on 10 May 1900 and towed to Kronstadt on 31 August 1901 for fitting out. She made her machinery trials in October, well before she was completed the next year. She sailed to Reval (modern Tallinn) on 1 August to participate in the naval review held there a few days later to commemorate the visit of the German Kaiser, Wilhelm II, to Russia. Pobeda entered service upon completing her artillery trials in October 1902, although she was not officially accepted until 10 March 1903, at a cost of 10,050,000 rubles. She had already sailed from Libau on 13 November 1902 and arrived at Port Arthur on 13 June 1903 for assignment to the Pacific Squadron.

=== Battle of Port Arthur ===
After the Japanese victory in the First Sino-Japanese War of 1894–95, tensions had arisen between Russia and Japan over their ambitions to control both Manchuria and Korea. A further issue was the Russian failure to withdraw its troops from Manchuria in October 1903, as it had promised. Japan had begun negotiations to ease the situation in 1901, but the Russian government was slow and uncertain in its replies because it had not yet decided exactly how to resolve the problems. Japan interpreted these as deliberate prevarications designed to buy time to complete the Russian armament programs. The final straws were news of Russian timber concessions in northern Korea and the Russian refusal to acknowledge Japanese interests in Manchuria while continuing to place conditions on Japanese activities in Korea. These led the Japanese government to decide in December 1903 that war was now inevitable. The Pacific Squadron began mooring in the outer harbor at night as tensions with Japan increased, so as to react more quickly to any Japanese attempt to land troops in Korea.

On the night of 8/9 February 1904, the IJN launched a surprise attack on the Russian fleet at Port Arthur. Pobeda was not hit in the initial torpedo-boat attack, and sortied the following morning when the Combined Fleet, commanded by Vice Admiral Tōgō Heihachirō, attacked. Tōgō had expected the surprise night attack by his ships to be much more successful than it was, anticipating that the Russians would be badly disorganized and weakened, but they had recovered from their surprise and were ready for his attack. The Japanese ships were spotted by the protected cruiser Boyarin, which was patrolling offshore and alerted the Russian defenses. Tōgō chose to attack the Russian coastal defenses with his main armament and engage the ships with his secondary guns. Splitting his fire proved to be a poor decision as the Japanese eight-inch (203 mm) and six-inch guns inflicted little damage on the Russian ships, which concentrated all their fire on the Japanese ships with some effect. Pobeda was hit once or twice amidships near the waterline, losing two men killed and four wounded, but the shell(s) failed to penetrate the ship's armor and little damage was done.

On 22 March, Pobeda joined several other battleships firing indirectly at Japanese ships bombarding Port Arthur's harbor and hit the Japanese battleship Fuji once, killing seven men. She participated in the action of 13 April, when Tōgō successfully lured out a portion of the Pacific Squadron, including Vice Admiral Stepan Makarov's flagship, the battleship Petropavlovsk. When Makarov spotted the five Japanese battleships, he turned back for Port Arthur, and Petropavlovsk struck a mine laid by the Japanese the previous night. The ship sank in less than two minutes after one of her magazines exploded, and Makarov was one of the 677 killed. When Pobeda was returning to port after Petropavlovsk sank, she struck a mine herself, but was able to steam to the harbor under her own power despite an 11° list. Her repairs were completed on 9 June although some of her guns were removed during this time to reinforce the defenses of the port. Pobeda lost a total of three 6-inch, two 75-millimeter, one 47-millimeter and four 37-millimeter guns. She sailed with the rest of the Russian squadron on 23 June in an abortive attempt to reach Vladivostok. The new fleet commander, Rear Admiral Wilgelm Vitgeft, ordered the squadron to return to Port Arthur when it encountered the Japanese fleet shortly before sunset as he did not wish to engage the numerically superior Japanese in a night battle. Pobeda bombarded Japanese positions besieging the port on 28 July.

=== Battle of the Yellow Sea ===
The Japanese bombardment of 9 August, coupled with a direct order from Tsar Nicholas II, forced Vitgeft to make another attempt to reach Vladivostok. The squadron sortied in an attempt to escape to Vladivostok the next morning. At 12:25, it was spotted by Japanese cruisers and intercepted by the Combined Fleet in what became the Battle of the Yellow Sea. Pobeda was third in line during the battle, and was not seriously damaged during the early long-range stage of the action. Around 18:00, two 12-inch shells from the battleship Asahi penetrated the conning tower of the Russian flagship Tsesarevich, killing Vitgeft and the helmsman, severely wounding the captain, and causing the ship to come to a dead stop after executing a sharp turn. Thinking that this was a maneuver planned by Vitgeft, the Russian battleline started to execute the same turn, causing all of the ships directly behind Tsesarevich, including Pobeda, to maneuver wildly to avoid hitting the stationary flagship.

As the Japanese ships continued to pound the Tsesarevich, the battleship Retvizan boldly charged Tōgō's battleline in an attempt to divert the Japanese shellfire, followed shortly afterward by Peresvet, the flagship of the squadron's second-in-command, Rear Admiral Prince Pavel Ukhtomsky. The Japanese battleline immediately shifted fire to the oncoming ships, badly damaging both and forcing them to turn away. Ukhtomsky signaled the other Russian ships to follow him back to Port Arthur, but the signal was hard to discern because the flags had to be hung from the bridge railings because Peresvet's topmasts had been shot away; the signal was only gradually recognized. Although Pobeda was struck by eleven large-caliber hits that killed 4 men and wounded 29, including one below the waterline, they failed to penetrate her armor and she reached Port Arthur without any difficulties; the hits did knock out one 10-inch gun and three 75-millimeter guns.

=== Siege of Port Arthur ===
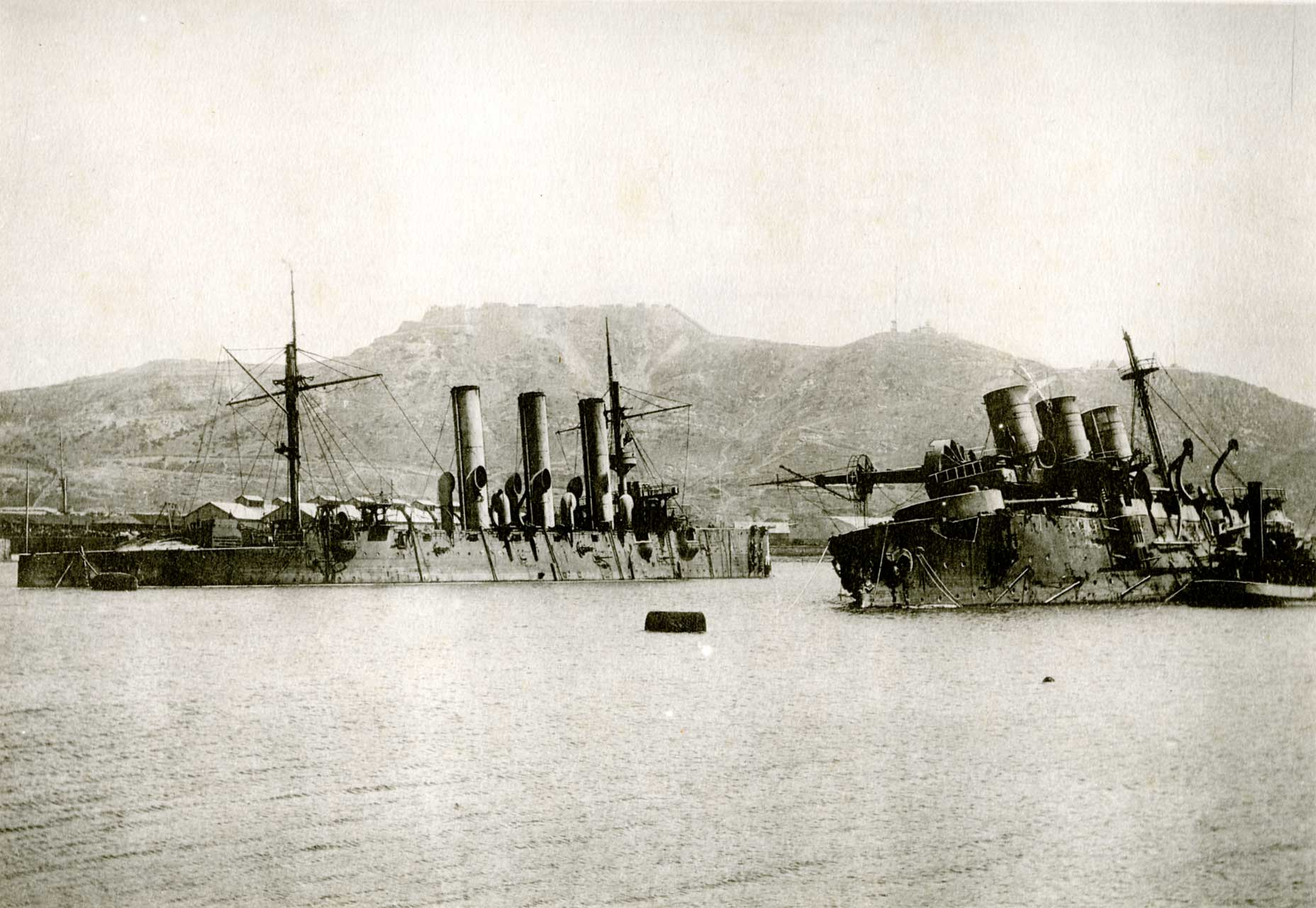
Pobeda (right) and the protected cruiser Pallada sunk in Port Arthur

Returning to Port Arthur on 11 August, the Russian squadron found the city still under siege by the Japanese Third Army led by Baron Nogi Maresuke. The new commander, Rear Admiral Robert N. Viren, decided to use the men and guns of the Pacific Squadron to reinforce the defenses of Port Arthur and even more guns were stripped from the squadron's ships. This proved to make little difference and Pobeda was struck by several 5.9-inch (150 mm) and 4.7-inch shells on 28 September that did no significant damage. The Japanese bombardment with medium guns continued for the next month and a half and the ship was repeatedly struck, without much effect. Japanese troops were able to seize 203 Hill which overlooked the harbor on 5 December. This allowed the Imperial Japanese Army's 28-centimeter (11 in) siege guns to fire directly at the Russian ships; they hit Pobeda approximately 30 times and sank her in shallow water on 7 December 1904. Russian attempts to destroy the ship before they surrendered were frustrated because her vital parts were already underwater.

== Japanese career ==
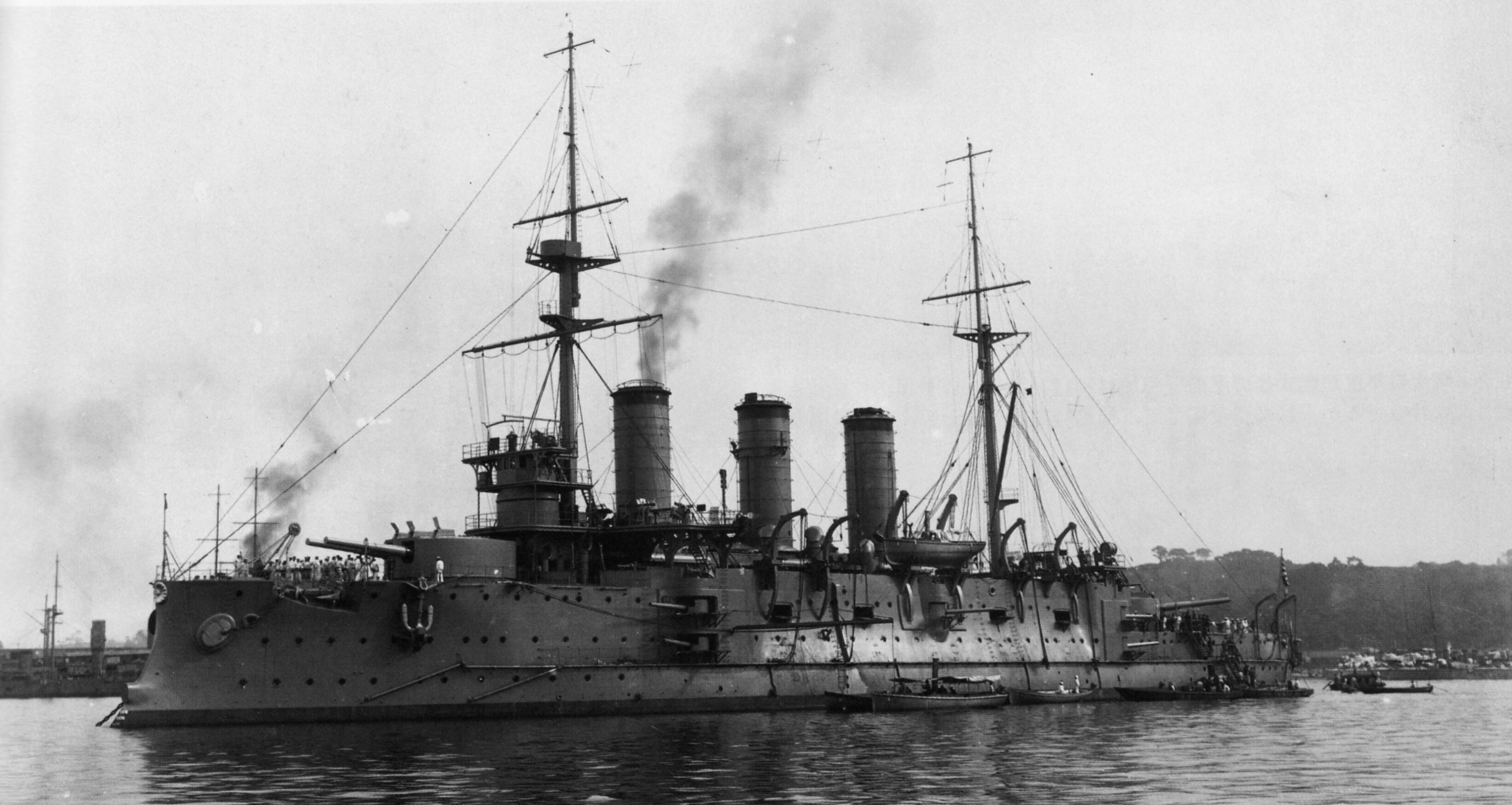
Suwo at anchor in Yokosuka, 10 October 1908

Pobeda was refloated by Japanese engineers on 17 October 1905 and was classified as a first-class battleship by the IJN. She was renamed as Suwo on 25 October, after the ancient province. She steamed under her own power to Sasebo Naval Arsenal, where she arrived on 16 December and began temporary repairs. Her reconstruction at Yokosuka Naval Arsenal began in May 1906 and lasted until 10 October 1908. To improve her stability, Suwo's forward fighting top was removed. Suwo was rearmed with four 10-inch 45 caliber guns, ten 6-inch guns and sixteen QF 12-pounder 12 cwt (3 in (76 mm)) (Note: "Cwt" is the abbreviation for hundredweight, 12 cwt referring to the weight of the gun.) guns. Two above-water 18-inch (450 mm) torpedo tubes replaced her original torpedo armament and her crew now numbered 791 officers and enlisted men.

Suwo was re-designated as a first-class coastal defense ship on 28 August 1912 and became a training ship for cadets and engineers. Initially assigned to the 1st Standing Squadron when World War I began, she shortly afterwards became the flagship of the 2nd Squadron, commanded by Vice Admiral Kato Sadakichi. The squadron was tasked to blockade the German-owned port of Qingdao, China, and to cooperate with the Imperial Japanese Army in capturing the city. Suwo and the other ships of the squadron, reinforced by the British pre-dreadnought HMS Triumph, bombarded German fortifications throughout the siege until the Germans surrendered on 7 November. Suwo served as flagship of the Second Squadron of the Second Fleet in 1915–1916 before becoming a gunnery training ship at Yokosuka for the rest of the war. In April 1922, in compliance with the Washington Naval Treaty, Suwo was disarmed at the Kure Naval Arsenal. While her armor was being removed, the ship capsized on 13 July. She was probably scrapped in 1922–1923, but at least one source suggests she was refloated and hulked, serving until being broken up at Kure in 1946. (Note: She is not listed, however, in Fukui Shinzo's authoritative Japanese Naval Vessels at the End of World War II.)
