= Russian battleship Peresvet =

Russian late 19th century pre-dreadnought battleship

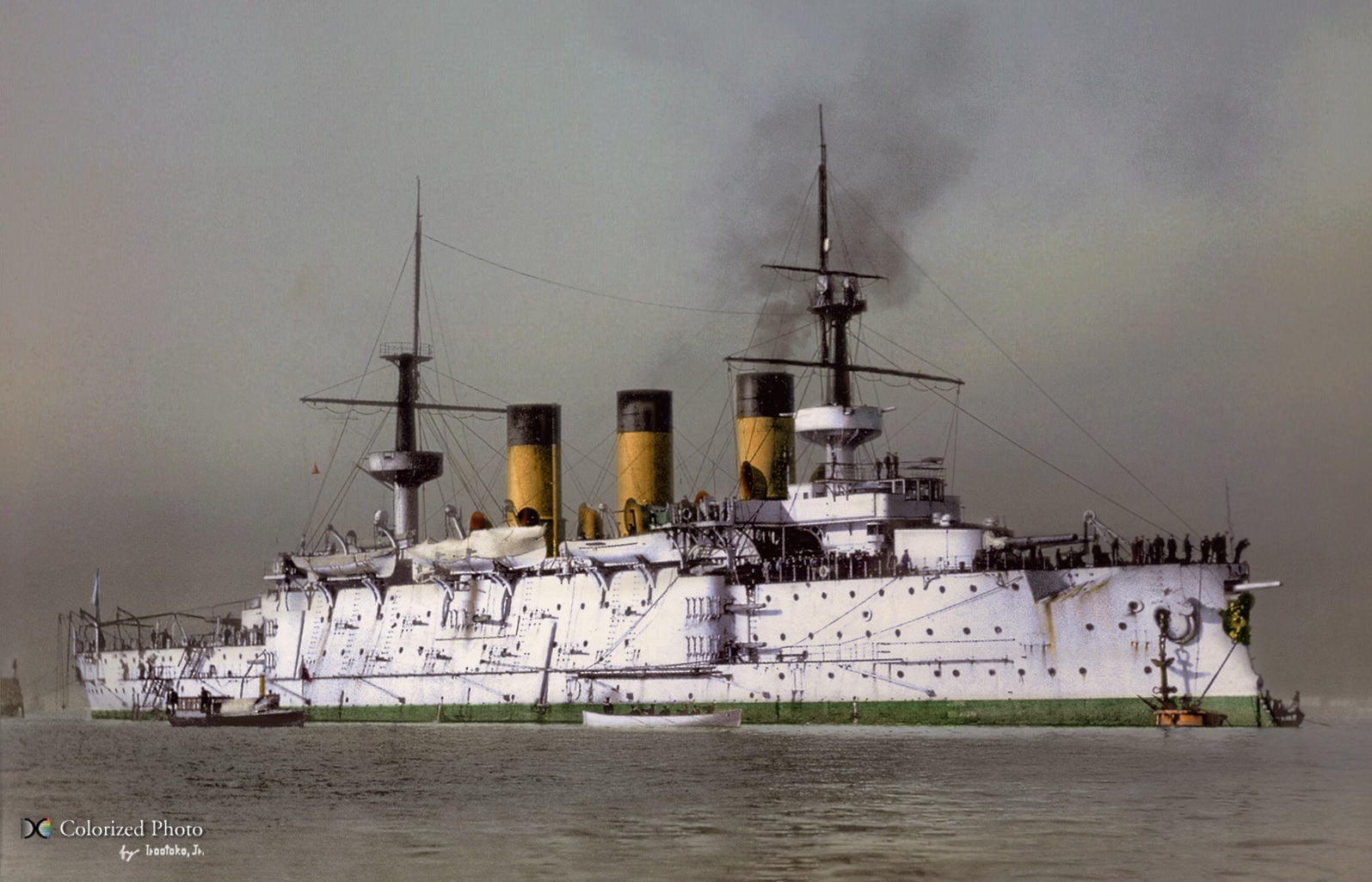
- Peresvet at anchor, 1901

History

Russian Empire
- Name: Peresvet
- Namesake: Alexander Peresvet
- Builder: Baltic Yard, Saint Petersburg
- Cost: 10,540,000 rubles
- Laid down: 21 November 1895 (Note: All dates used in this article are New Style.)
- Launched: 19 May 1898
- In service: August 1901
- Captured: January 1905 by the Japanese after the siege of Port Arthur
- Fate: Scuttled, 7 December 1904

Japan
- Name: Sagami
- Namesake: Sagami Province
- Acquired: Refloated, 29 June 1905
- In service: 20 July 1908
- Reclassified: As 1st-class coast defense ship
- Fate: Sold to Russia, March 1916

Russian Empire
- Acquired: Bought, March 1916
- Renamed: Peresvet
- Reclassified: As armored cruiser, 5 April 1916
- Fate: Sunk by mine off Port Said, Egypt, 4 January 1917

General characteristics
- Class & type: Peresvet-class pre-dreadnought battleship
- Displacement: 13,810 long tons (14,032 t)
- Length: 434 ft 5 in (132.4 m)
- Beam: 71 ft 6 in (21.8 m)
- Draft: 26 ft 3 in (8.0 m)
- Installed power: 30 Belleville boilers; 14,500 ihp (10,813 kW)
- Propulsion: 3 shafts, 3 triple-expansion steam engines
- Speed: 18 knots (33 km/h; 21 mph)
- Range: 6,200 nmi (11,500 km; 7,100 mi) at 10 knots (19 km/h; 12 mph)
- Complement: 27 officers, 744 men
- Armament: As built: 2 × twin 10 in (254 mm) guns 11 × single 6 in (152 mm) guns 20 × single 75 mm (3 in) guns 20 × single 47 mm (1.9 in) guns 8 × single 37 mm (1.5 in) guns 5 × 15 in (381 mm) torpedo tubes 45 × mines As Sagami: 2 × twin 10 in (254 mm) guns 10 × single 6 in (152 mm) guns 16 × single 12-pdr (3 in (76 mm)) guns 2 × 18 in (450 mm) torpedo tubes
- Armor: Harvey armor; Belt: 4–9 inches (102–229 mm); Deck: 2–3 inches (51–76 mm); Turrets: 9 inches (229 mm)

Peresvet (Russian: Пересвет) was the lead ship of the three Peresvet-class battleships built for the Imperial Russian Navy at the end of the nineteenth century. The ship was transferred to the Pacific Squadron upon completion and based at Port Arthur from 1903. During the Russo-Japanese War of 1904–1905, she participated in the Battle of Port Arthur and was seriously damaged during the Battle of the Yellow Sea and again in the siege of Port Arthur. The ship was scuttled before the Russians surrendered, then salvaged by the Japanese and placed into service with the name Sagami (相模).

Partially rearmed, Sagami was reclassified by the Imperial Japanese Navy (IJN) as a coastal defense ship in 1912. In 1916, the Japanese sold her to the Russians, their allies since the beginning of World War I. En route to the White Sea in early 1917, she sank off Port Said, Egypt, after striking mines laid by a German submarine.

== Design and description ==
The design of the Peresvet class was inspired by the British second-class battleships of the Centurion class. The British ships were intended to defeat commerce-raiding armored cruisers like the Russian ships Rossia and Rurik, and the Peresvet class was designed to support their armored cruisers. This role placed a premium on high speed and long range at the expense of heavy armament and armor.

Peresvet was 434 feet 5 inches (132.4 m) long overall, and had a beam of 71 feet 6 inches (21.8 m) and a draft of 26 feet 3 inches (8 m). Designed to displace 12,674 long tons (12,877 t), she was almost 1,200 long tons (1,219 t) overweight and displaced 13,810 long tons (14,030 t). Her crew consisted of 27 officers and 744 enlisted men. The ship was powered by three vertical triple-expansion steam engines using steam generated by 30 Belleville boilers. The engines were rated at 14,500 indicated horsepower (10,800 kW) and designed to reach a top speed of 18 knots (33 km/h; 21 mph). Peresvet, however, reached a top speed of 18.44 knots (34.15 km/h; 21.22 mph) from 14,532 indicated horsepower (10,837 kW) during her sea trials in November 1899. She carried a maximum of 2,060 long tons (2,090 t) of coal, which allowed her to steam for 6,200 nautical miles (11,500 km; 7,100 mi) at a speed of 10 knots (19 km/h; 12 mph).

The ship's main battery consisted of four 10-inch (254 mm) guns mounted in two twin-gun turrets, one forward and one aft of the superstructure. The secondary armament consisted of eleven Canet-series 6-inch (152 mm) quick-firing (QF) guns, mounted in casemates on the sides of the hull and in the bow, underneath the forecastle. Several smaller guns were carried for defense against torpedo boats. These included twenty 75-millimeter (3 in) QF guns, twenty 47-millimeter (1.9 in) Hotchkiss guns and eight 37-millimeter (1.5 in) guns. She was also armed with five 15-inch (381 mm) torpedo tubes, three above water and two submerged. The ship carried 45 mines to be used to protect her anchorage. Peresvet's waterline armor belt consisted of Harvey armor and was 4–9 inches (102–229 mm) thick. The Krupp cemented armor of her gun turrets had a maximum thickness of nine inches and her deck ranged from 2 to 3 inches (51 to 76 mm) in thickness.

== Construction and career ==
Peresvet was named after Alexander Peresvet, a Russian Orthodox monk who fought and died at the Battle of Kulikovo in 1380, against a Mongolian army. Her keel was laid down on 21 November 1895 by the Baltic Works in Saint Petersburg and she launched on 19 May 1898. She was not completed, however, until July 1901, at the cost of 10,540,000 rubles. Peresvet entered service in August, and was sent to Port Arthur in October 1901. En route, she ran aground on the tip of Langeland Island while passing through the Danish Great Belt on 1 November, but was apparently not seriously damaged. Upon arrival she was assigned to the Pacific Squadron and became the flagship of the squadron's second-in-command, Rear Admiral Prince Pavel Ukhtomsky.

=== Battle of Port Arthur ===
After the Japanese victory in the First Sino-Japanese War of 1894–95, tensions had arisen between Russia and Japan over their ambitions to control both Manchuria and Korea. A further issue was the Russian failure to withdraw its troops from Manchuria in October 1903 as promised. Japan had begun negotiations to ease the situation in 1901, but the Russian government was slow and uncertain in its replies because it had not yet decided exactly how to resolve the problems. Japan interpreted these as deliberate prevarications designed to buy time to complete the Russian armament programs. The final straws were news of Russian timber concessions in northern Korea and the Russian refusal to acknowledge Japanese interests in Manchuria while continuing to place conditions on Japanese activities in Korea. These led the Japanese government to decide in December 1903 that war was now inevitable. The Pacific Squadron began mooring in the outer harbor at night as tensions with Japan increased, in order to react more quickly to any Japanese attempt to land troops in Korea.

On the night of 8/9 February 1904, the IJN launched a surprise attack on the Russian fleet at Port Arthur. Peresvet was not hit by the initial torpedo-boat incursion and sortied the following morning when the Combined Fleet, commanded by Vice Admiral Tōgō Heihachirō, attacked. Tōgō had expected the surprise night attack by his ships to be much more successful than it was, anticipating that the Russians would be badly disorganized and weakened, but they had recovered from their surprise and were ready for his assault. The Japanese vessels had been spotted by the protected cruiser Boyarin, which was patrolling offshore, and alerted the Russian defenses. Tōgō chose to attack the Russian coastal defenses with his main armament and engage the ships with his secondary guns. Splitting his fire proved to be a poor decision as the Japanese eight-inch (203 mm) and six-inch guns inflicted inconsequential damage on the Russian ships, which concentrated all their fire on their opponents with some effect. Peresvet was hit three times with little effect during the battle.

On 22 March, Peresvet joined several other battleships firing indirectly at Japanese ships bombarding Port Arthur's harbor. While training outside Port Arthur on 26 March, she accidentally collided with the battleship Sevastopol and sustained minor damage. Peresvet participated in the action of 13 April, when Tōgō successfully lured out a portion of the Pacific Squadron, including Vice Admiral Stepan Makarov's flagship, the battleship Petropavlovsk. When Makarov spotted the five Japanese battleships, he turned back for Port Arthur and Petropavlovsk struck a minefield laid by the Japanese the previous night. The ship sank in less than two minutes following the explosion of one of her magazines, and Makarov was one of the 677 killed. Emboldened by his success, Tōgō resumed long-range bombardment missions. Two days later, Peresvet hit the armored cruiser Nisshin once as the latter ship was bombarding Port Arthur.

Peresvet sailed with the rest of the Pacific Squadron on 23 June in an abortive attempt to reach Vladivostok. The new squadron commander, Rear Admiral Wilgelm Vitgeft, ordered the squadron to return to Port Arthur when it encountered the Japanese fleet shortly before sunset, as he did not wish to engage his numerically superior opponents in a night battle. Peresvet bombarded Japanese positions besieging Port Arthur on 28 July. Some of the ship's guns were removed during the summer to reinforce the defenses of the port. Peresvet lost a total of three 6-inch, two 75-millimeter, two 47-millimeter and four 37-millimeter guns. She was hit on 9 August by two 4.7-inch (120 mm) shells fired by a battery with a narrow view of the harbor, but they caused only slight damage.

=== Battle of the Yellow Sea ===
The Japanese bombardment, coupled with a direct order from Tsar Nicholas II, forced Vitgeft to make an attempt to reach Vladivostok. The squadron sortied in an attempt to escape to Vladivostok in the morning of 10 August. At 12:25, it was spotted by Japanese cruisers and intercepted by the Combined Fleet in what became the Battle of the Yellow Sea. Peresvet was fourth in line during the battle, and was not seriously damaged during the early long-range stage of the action. Around 18:00 her topmasts were destroyed and two 12-inch shells from the battleship Asahi penetrated the conning tower of the Russian flagship Tsesarevich, killing Vitgeft and the helmsman, severely wounding the captain, and causing the ship to come to a dead stop after executing a sharp turn. Thinking that this was a maneuver planned by Vitgeft, the Russian battleline started to execute the same turn, causing all of the ships directly behind Tsesarevich, including Peresvet, to maneuver wildly to avoid hitting the stationary flagship.

As the Japanese ships continued to pound the Tsesarevich, the battleship Retvizan, followed shortly afterward by Peresvet, boldly charged Tōgō's battleline in an attempt to divert the Japanese shellfire. The Japanese battleline immediately shifted fire to the oncoming ships, badly damaging both and forcing them to turn away. Ukhtomsky signaled the other Russian ships to follow him back to Port Arthur, but the signal was hard to discern because the flags had to be hung from the bridge railings without the topmasts and were only gradually recognized. Peresvet received a total of 39 hits of all sizes that killed 13 men and wounded 69. Her forward 10-inch turret was knocked out and several hits near the waterline caused flooding; compartments of the double bottom had to be counterflooded to restore some of her stability. Repairs were not completed until late September.

=== Siege of Port Arthur ===
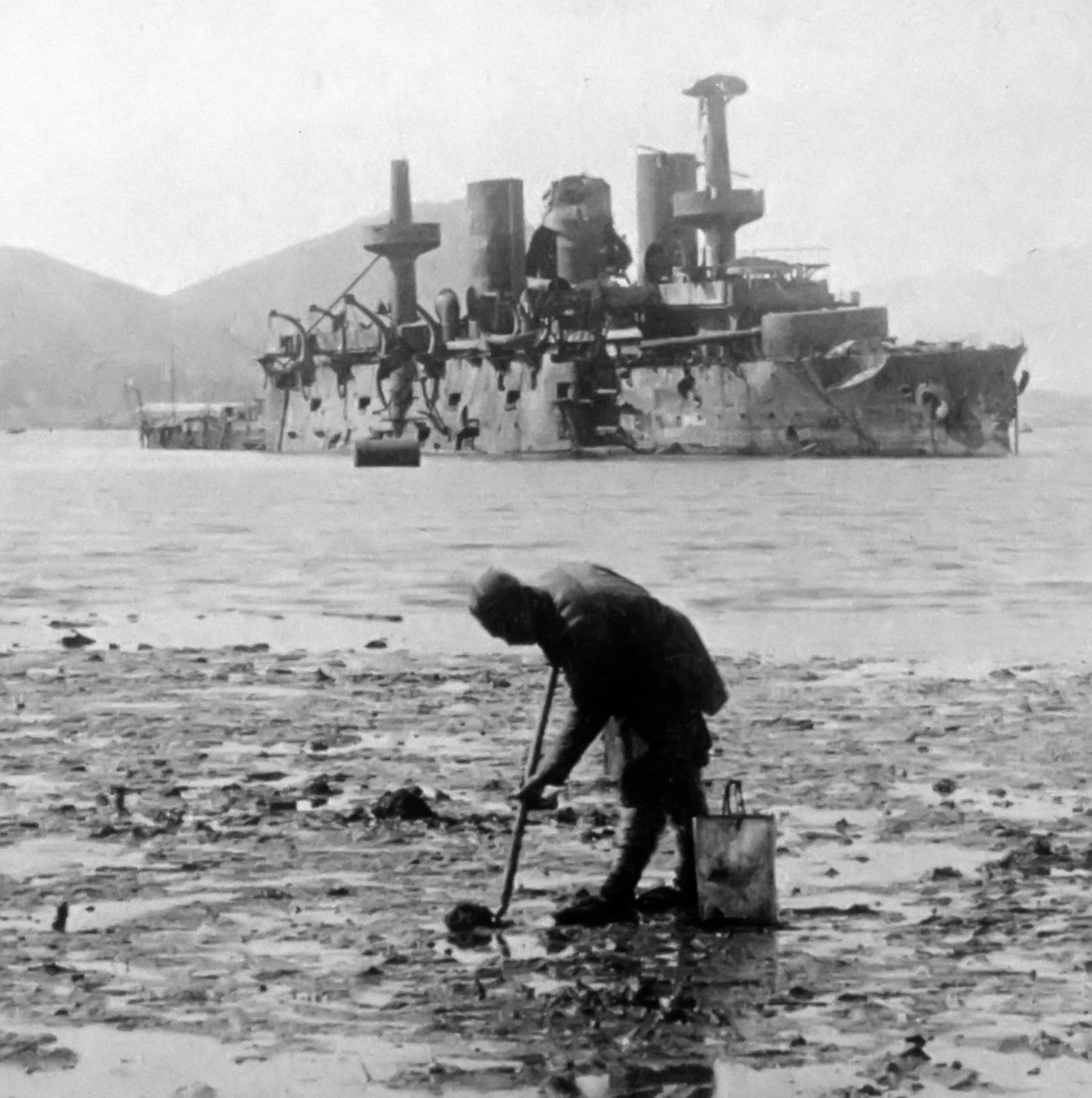
Peresvet after having been scuttled

Returning to Port Arthur on 11 August, the Russian squadron found the city still under siege by the Japanese Third Army led by Baron Nogi Maresuke. The new commander, Rear Admiral Robert N. Viren, decided to use the men and guns of the Pacific Squadron to reinforce the defenses of Port Arthur and even more guns were stripped from the squadron's ships. On 20–22 September Japanese troops attacked 203 Hill, which overlooked the harbor; Peresvet, Retvizan, the battleship Poltava and the gunboat Bobr bombarded the Japanese positions to support the successful defense of the hill. The Japanese began firing blindly into the harbor on 30 September and hit Peresvet with at least six 5.9-inch (150 mm) and 4.7-inch shells. She was struck once more the following day. On 2 October she was hit by nine 11-inch (280 mm) shells that failed to penetrate her deck armor, but did considerable damage to the unprotected portions of the ship. The Japanese troops were able to seize Hill 203 on 5 December. This allowed the Imperial Japanese Army's siege guns to fire directly at the Russian ships and they hit Peresvet many times. The Russians scuttled her in shallow water on 7 December 1904 without, however, seriously damaging her, possibly in the hope of fooling the Japanese into switching targets.

=== Japanese career ===
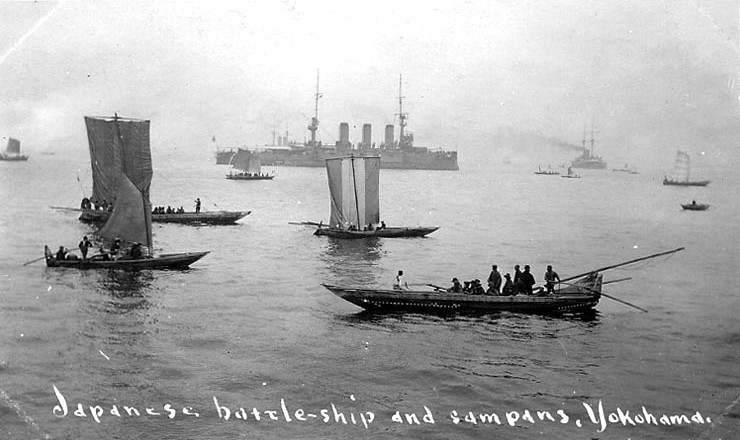
Sagami (center, rear) at anchor in Yokohama harbor during the Great White Fleet's visit, September 1908

Peresvet was refloated by Japanese engineers on 29 June 1905 and steamed under her own power to Sasebo Naval Arsenal, where she arrived on 25 August. She was renamed Sagami, after the eponymous ancient province. She was classified as a first-class battleship on 25 August and arrived at Yokosuka Naval Arsenal on 16 September. Her repairs began on 30 September and continued until 20 July 1908, although she participated in the review of captured ships on 23 October 1905.

To improve her stability, Sagami's forward fighting top was removed. Sagami was rearmed with four 10-inch 45 caliber guns, ten 6-inch (152 mm) guns and sixteen QF 12-pounder 12 cwt (Note: "Cwt" is the abbreviation for hundredweight, 12 cwt referring to the weight of the gun.) guns. Two above-water 18-inch torpedo tubes replaced her original torpedo armament and her crew now numbered 791 officers and enlisted men. She was one of the reception ships when the American Great White Fleet visited Japan in late 1908 and was often used as an "enemy" ship during the annual fleet maneuvers. Sagami was reclassified as a first-class coastal defense ship on 28 August 1912.

=== Return to Russia ===
In 1916 the Russian government decided to reinforce its naval strength outside the Baltic and Black Seas. As Japan and Russia were allies during World War I, the Japanese government sold Sagami and some other ex-Russian warships back to Russia in March. She arrived in Vladivostok on 3 April, where she re-assumed her former name of Peresvet, and was classified as an armored cruiser two days later. The ship ran aground on 23 May while conducting trials and was refloated by the IJN on 9 July. Peresvet arrived at Maizuru Naval Arsenal for repairs on 30 July and sailed for European Russia on 18 October. She was intended to serve with the White Sea Fleet and paused en route in Port Said for machinery repairs at the beginning of 1917. On 4 January 1917, about 10 nautical miles (19 km; 12 mi) north of the harbor, the ship struck two mines that had been laid by the German submarine SM U-73. Holed forward and abreast one of her boiler rooms, Peresvet sank after catching fire. Losses were reported as either 167 or 116 men.
