= Pavel Petrovich Ukhtomsky =

Russian vice admiral (1848–1910)

Prince Pavel Petrovich Ukhtomsky
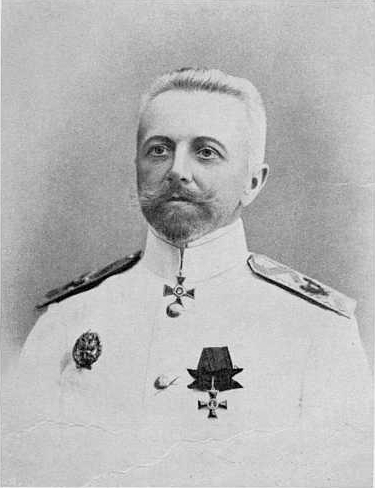
- Pavel Petrovich Ukhtomsky
- Born: 10 June 1848
- Died: 14 October 1910 (aged 62); St. Petersburg, Russian Empire
- Military career
- Allegiance: Russian Empire
- Branch: Imperial Russian Navy
- Service years: 1873–1906
- Rank: Vice Admiral
- Conflicts: Russo-Japanese War; Battle of the Yellow Sea

Prince Pavel Petrovich Ukhtomsky (Russian: Па́вел Петро́вич Ухто́мский 10 June 1848 – 14 October 1910) was a career naval officer in the Imperial Russian Navy, noted for his action at the Battle of the Yellow Sea in the Russo-Japanese War of 1904-1905. He was held in scant respect by his colleagues, who felt that his rank and position was owed more to familial connections than any competence or ability. Lt. Commander Newton A. McCully, the American naval attaché in Port Arthur through much of the siege noted that Ukhtomsky "was not esteemed as particularly able, but was considered a Russian patriot, and had the credit with the fleet of having forced Admiral Vitgeft to make the sortie of June 23"

== Biography ==
Ukhtomsky’s family traced their lineage to the Rurik dynasty and had been moderately prominent boyars in the Muscovite period.

Ukhtomsky graduated from the Sea Cadets in 1867 and underwent further education at the Maritime College in 1873, specializing in mine warfare. He was promoted to captain, 2nd rank in 1885 and to captain, 1st rank in 1894. From 1896, he was commander of the cruiser Vladimir Monomakh, followed by the battleship Petr Veliky in 1900. In 1901, Ukhtomsky was promoted to rear admiral and appointed chief-of-staff of Kronstadt.

At the start of the Russo-Japanese War, Ukhtomsky was at Port Arthur as deputy commander under Admiral Oskar Starck and was entrusted with a portion of the admiral's squadron. Following Starck’s dismissal on 24 February 1904, he served as acting commander for ten days before being formally relieved by Vice Admiral Stepan Makarov. He was awarded the Order of St. Stanislaus, 1st class with swords, for his participation in the defense of the Russian base against Japanese destroyer attacks.

After the death of Admiral Makarov on 13 April, Ukhtomsky again served as acting commander until Admiral Yevgeni Ivanovich Alekseyev took command. During the Battle of the Yellow Sea, after Admiral Wilgelm Vitgeft on the battleship Tsesarevich was killed by a Japanese shell, Ukhtomsky took command as the senior officer. The signal halyards of his flagship, the battleship Peresvet, had been shot away; after restoring communications, Ukhtomsky ordered the fleet to return to the safety of Port Arthur. While some perceived his actions as acts of cowardice, they preserved the fleet's remaining strength.

The Peresvet suffered significant damage at Yellow Sea. According to Lt. Commander Newton McCully who visited the ship after the engagement and observed the damage in a diplomatic capacity, the Peresvet received no fewer than sixteen "well defined" penetrating hits by shells of 8" and larger - the most of any Russian ship in the engagement. By the end of the battle Peresvet was unable to steam at more than six knots (because of significant damage to her funnels and thus to the boilers below), leaving Ukhtomsky with a crippled flagship and a fleet of severely damaged vessels. He commanded Port Arthur for the next three weeks until 4 September, when he was removed from command and replaced by the lower-ranking Captain Robert Wiren.

After the end of the war, Ukhtomsky retired from active service on 24 July 1906, citing illness. In recognition of his service, he was promoted to the rank of vice admiral. He died on 14 October 1910 in St. Petersburg.

== Honors ==
- Order of St. Stanislaus, 1st degree with swords, 1904
