= Robert Viren =

Baltic German career naval officer in the Imperial Russian Navy

Robert Nikolaevich Viren
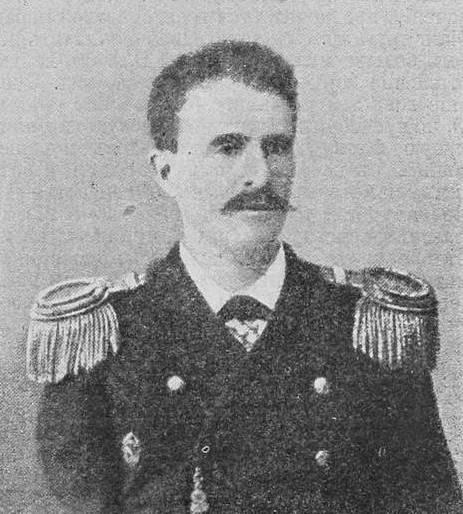
- Born: 6 January [O.S. 25 December 1856] 1857; Novgorod, Novgorod Governorate, Russian Empire
- Died: 14 March [O.S. 2] 1917 (aged 60); Kronstadt, Petrograd Governorate, Russian Empire
- Other name: Robert Reinhold von Wirén
- Military career
- Allegiance: Russia
- Branch: Imperial Russian Navy
- Service years: 1877–1917
- Rank: Admiral
- Conflicts: Russo-Japanese War; Siege of Port Arthur (surrendered); World War I

Robert Nikolayevich Viren (Russian: Роберт Николаевич Вирен; 6 January 1857 – 14 March 1917), also known as Robert Reinhold von Wirén, was a Baltic German career naval officer in the Imperial Russian Navy, noted for his role in the Russo-Japanese War of 1904–1905.

== Biography ==
Viren was of Finnish descent through his paternal grandfather Johan Petterinpoika Viinikka from Virrat. Viren was a graduate of the Sea Cadets in 1877 and served as a midshipman on a clipper ship with the Baltic Fleet. In 1883, he was promoted to lieutenant and was awarded the Order of St. Stanislaus, 3rd degree. He graduated from the Mine Warfare School in 1884 and was awarded the Order of St. Anna 3rd degree in 1888. After graduating from the Nikolaev Maritime Academy in 1889, he served as a mine warfare officer on the battleship Petr Veliky in 1891 and was promoted to lieutenant commander. He became captain, 2nd rank in 1894. He subsequently commanded a number of vessels with the Baltic Fleet, and was promoted to captain, 1st rank in 1901. In 1903 he was given command of the modern armored cruiser Bayan.

At the start of the Russo-Japanese War, Viren was commanding the Bayan as part of the Russian Pacific Squadron based at Port Arthur. During the Battle of Port Arthur he developed a reputation as a daring and capable commander. Following the death of Admiral Wilgelm Vitgeft at the Battle of the Yellow Sea, Prince Pavel Ukhtomsky briefly took command of the Port Arthur Squadron, but could not command the support or respect of his peers. As no one officer could reach the besieged port, Viren, although a relatively junior officer with low seniority was promoted to rear admiral and on 4 September 1904 took command of the squadron during the last four months of the siege. During this time, with the besieged fleet unable to sortie and under continuous bombardment from land, Viren ordered that his warships be stripped of their guns, which were used to bolster the port's landward defenses, and his sailors were ordered to fight as naval infantry. He was wounded in combat in November 1904. After the surrender of Port Arthur, he was taken as a prisoner of war by the Japanese. After the war, he was awarded the Gold Sword for Bravery and the Order of St George, 4th degree, as well as the Order of St. Stanislaus, 1st class with swords.

Viren was also appointed the head of artillery training for the Baltic Fleet in 1906–1907, and became commander of the Black Sea Fleet from 1907 to 1908. He was noted as a strict disciplinarian. He served on an Admiralty Board from 1908 to 1909. In 1909, he became the commandant of the port of Kronstadt and was promoted to vice admiral.

After the start of World War I, Viren was promoted to admiral on 15 February 1915. In 1916, he was awarded the Order of St George, 3rd degree, for personal bravery in preventing the explosion of a powder magazine in the Petrovsky Fort at Kronstadt. However, after the start of March 1917 February Revolution, Viren was one of several senior officers bayoneted during the Kronstadt mutiny in Anchor Square, Kronstadt, by pro-Bolshevik sailors.

Viren was buried in Lutheran (German) cemetery in Kronstadt. The exact location was lost, but in the 1990s a symbolic memorial stone was erected there in his memory.

== Honors ==
- Order of Saint Stanislaus, 3rd degree
- Order of St. Anne, 3rd degree
- Order of Saint Stanislaus, 2nd degree
- Order of St. Anne, 2nd degree
- Order of St Vladimir, 4th class with bow
- Order of St Vladimir, 3rd class
- Order of Saint Stanislaus, 1st degree
- Order of St. Anne
- Order of St Vladimir, 2nd class
- Order of the White Eagle
- Order of St. George, 4th class
- Gold Sword for Bravery

== Sources ==
- Connaughton, Richard. Rising Sun and Tumbling Bear: Russia's War with Japan . Cassell (2003). ISBN 0-304-36657-9
- Jukes, Jeffery. The Russo-Japanese War 1904–1905．Osprey 2002. ISBN 1-84176-446-9
- Kowner, Rotem (2006). Historical Dictionary of the Russo-Japanese War. Lanham, Maryland: The Scarecrow Press. ISBN 0-8108-4927-5.
- Stafford, Julian. Maritime Operations in the Russo-Japanese War 1904–1905. Naval Institute Press (1997). ISBN 1-55750-129-7
- Warner, Dennis & Peggy. The Tide at Sunrise; A History of the Russo-Japanese War, 1904–1905 . Charterhouse. (1974)
