= Battle of the Yellow Sea =

1904 Russo-Japanese War naval battle

- Part of the Russo-Japanese War
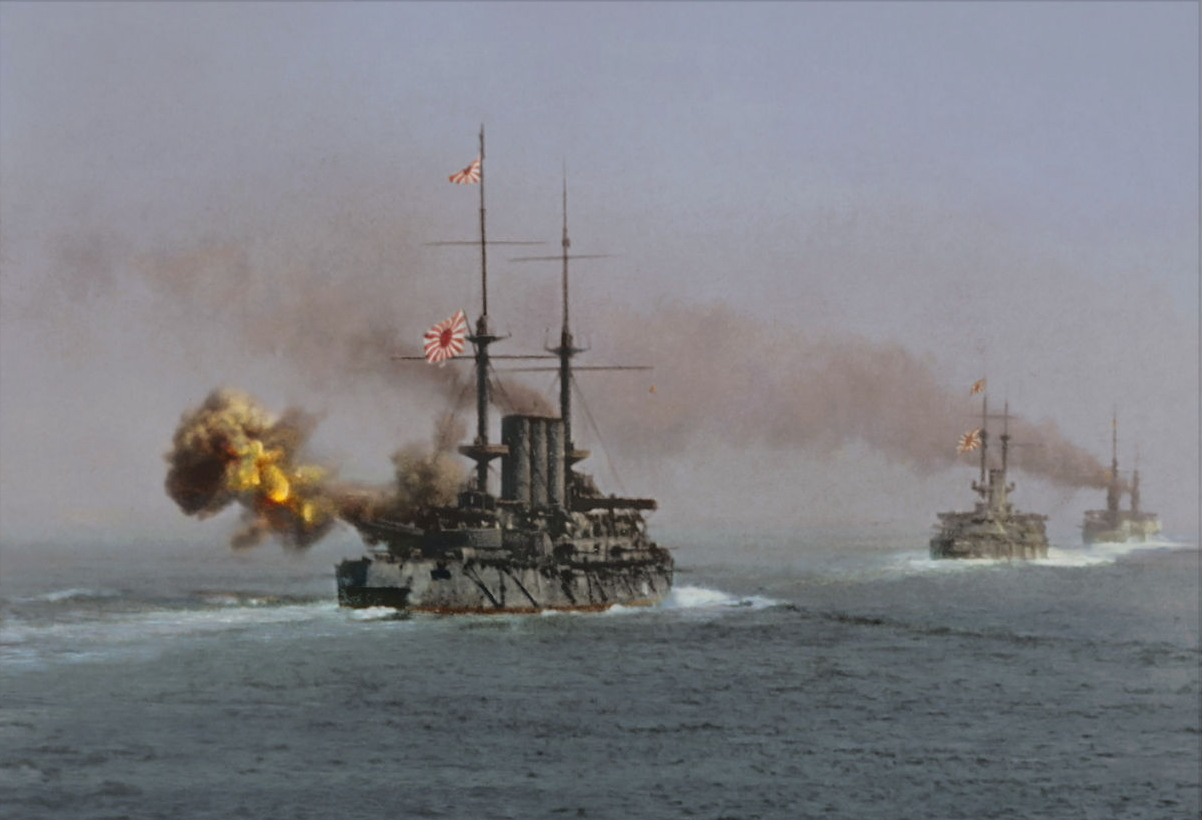
- Shikishima firing during the battle (colorized)
Date	10 August 1904
Location	Yellow Sea, off Shandong (Shantung) Peninsula, China 38°24′00″N 121°42′00″E)
Result	Result section

Belligerents
Empire of Japan	Russian Empire

Commanders and leaders
(Empire of Japan) Tōgō Heihachirō (Empire of Japan) Dewa Shigetō	(Russian Empire) Wilgelm Vitgeft † (Russian Empire) Pavel Ukhtomsky

Strength
5 battleships 6 armoured cruisers 8 protected cruisers 18 destroyers 30 torpedo boats	6 battleships 4 protected cruisers 14 destroyers

Casualties and losses
226 killed & wounded 2 battleships severely damaged 1 battleship slightly damaged 1 protected cruiser slightly damaged	340 killed & wounded 1 battleship severely damaged 5 battleships slightly damaged several ships interned in neutral ports

The Battle of the Yellow Sea (Japanese: 黄海海戦, romanized: Kōkai kaisen; Russian: Бой в Жёлтом море) was a naval battle of the Russo-Japanese War, fought on 10 August 1904. In the Russian Navy, it was referred to as the Battle of 10 August. The battle foiled an attempt by the Russian fleet at Lüshunkou (Port Arthur) to break out and form up with the Vladivostok squadron, forcing them to return to port. Four days later, the Battle off Ulsan similarly ended the Vladivostok group's sortie, forcing both fleets to remain at anchor.

== Background ==
The Imperial Russian Navy's First Pacific Squadron (Admiral Wilgelm Vitgeft) had been trapped in Lüshunkou (Port Arthur) since the Imperial Japanese Navy blockade began on 8 February 1904 with the Battle of Port Arthur. In July and early August, as the Imperial Japanese Army laid siege to Port Arthur, relations between Vitgeft and the Russian Viceroy Yevgeni Alekseyev soured. Alekseyev, a former admiral, favored an aggressive sortie so as to enable the First Pacific Squadron to link up with the Vladivostok Squadron to create a naval force powerful enough to challenge the Japanese fleet. Admiral Vitgeft believed in a fleet in being, which simply stayed at anchor, while at the same time contributing some of his weaponry to the Siege of Port Arthur as the safest course to follow.

Although passive, Vitgeft's preference was actually more in keeping with the Russian Navy's doctrine, which was building up strength (waiting for the arrival of the Baltic Fleet, also known as the 2nd Pacific Squadron), and then engaging the Japanese navy in decisive battle. After several exchanges of letters in which both insisted on their demand, Alexeyev turned to Tsar Nicholas II, who replied to him by telegraph: "I fully share your opinion that it is important for the squadron to break through quickly from Port Arthur to Vladivostok." After Alexeyev had warned Vitgeft of the possible legal consequences if he did not comply with the Tsar's order, Vitgeft finally yielded.

== Prelude ==
Most of the ships' guns that were still in working order were hastily replaced; but even after recovering everything that could be salvaged from the batteries ashore, as well as the guns of the ships that were to remain at Port Arthur, the squadron was still short one 304 mm, ten 106 mm and twelve 12-pounder guns when it encountered the Japanese fleet. The work of replacing the armament and preparing for sea was fraught with difficulties as the Japanese bombarded the harbor. The Russian fleet consisted of the ships of the line Tsesarevich, Vitgeft's flagship, Retvizan, Pobeda, Peresvet, Sevastopol and Poltava as well as the four protected cruisers Askold, Pallada, Diana and Nowik and 14 torpedo boats. The Japanese ships under Admiral Tōgō were part of the 1st Fleet (第一艦隊, Dai-ichi Kantai) and were composed of the 1st Division consisting of Mikasa, Asahi, Fuji and Shikishima, plus the armored cruisers Nisshin and Kasuga detached from the 5th Division, the 3rd Division (Vice Admiral Dewa Shigetō) consisting of Yakumo, Chitose, Kasagi and Takasago, the 5th Division (Rear Admiral Yamada) consisting of Matsushima, Itsukushima and Hashidate, the 6th Division (Rear Admiral Togo) consisting of Akashi, Suma, Chiyoda, Idzumi, and Akitsushima. In addition, Admiral Tōgō had 18 destroyers and 29 torpedo boats at his disposal.

== Battle ==
=== Opening moves ===
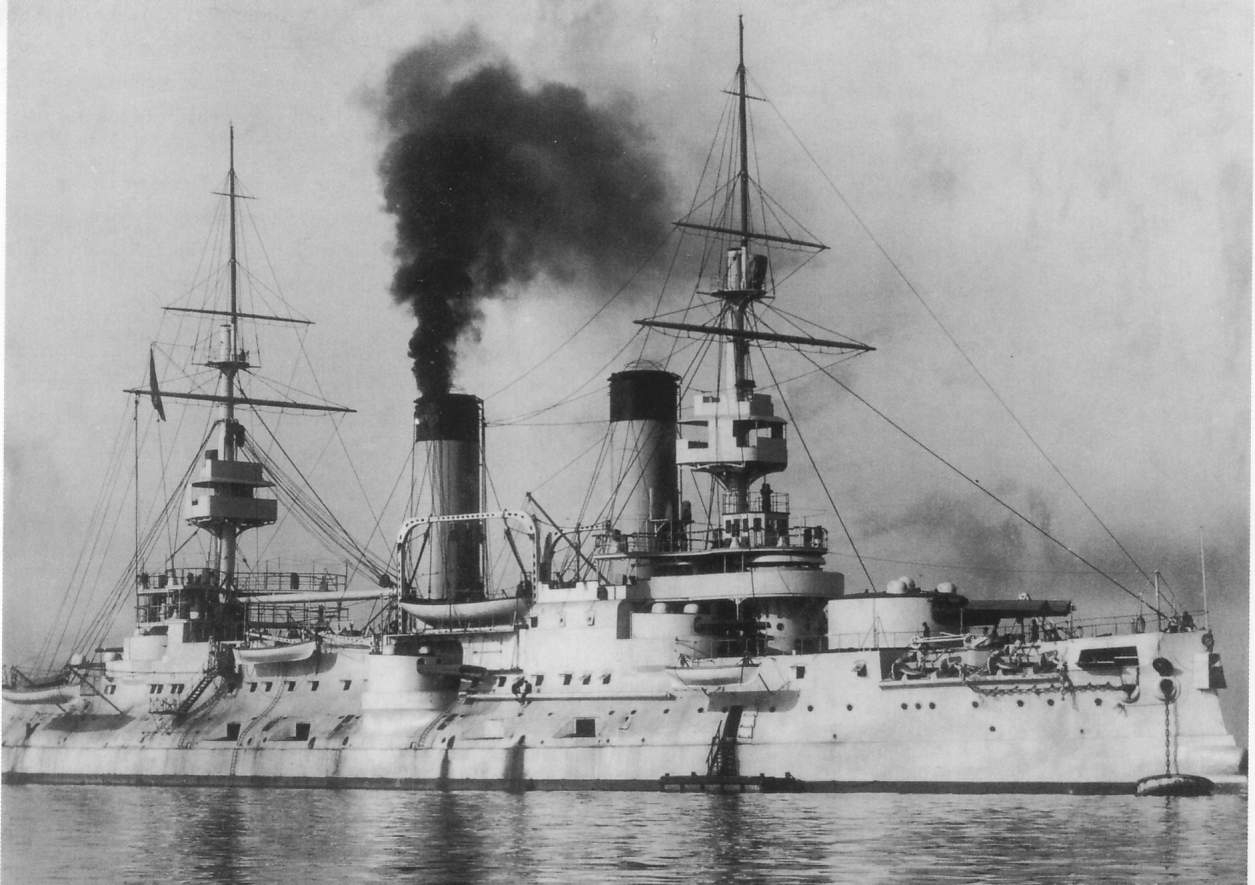
Admiral Vitgeft's flagship, Tsesarevich

On the morning of 28 July [O.S. 15 July] 1904, Vitgeft's squadron left the port of Port Arthur to break through the Japanese blockade and head for Vladivostok. At 9:00 a.m., the entire fleet slowly sailed out to sea, initially in line abeam to clear the shipping channel of mines, following a course along the coast of the Shandong Peninsula. By 10:30, the Russian fleet had reached open sea, whereupon half of the torpedo boats returned to Port Arthur while the fleet took a southeasterly course and proceeded at a speed of 8 kn (15 km/h; 9.2 mph). In the meantime, both fleets approached on a converging course and at about 11:30 the two main fleets came into view, only dimly visible through the thin haze. The leading ships were now about twelve nautical miles apart. The Mikasa led the Japanese fleet, followed by Asahi, Fuji, Shikishima, Kasuga and Nisshin in line ahead. As soon as they were directly in front of the enemy line, Admiral Tōgō had his ships simultaneously turn to port so that the Russian fleet was behind them.

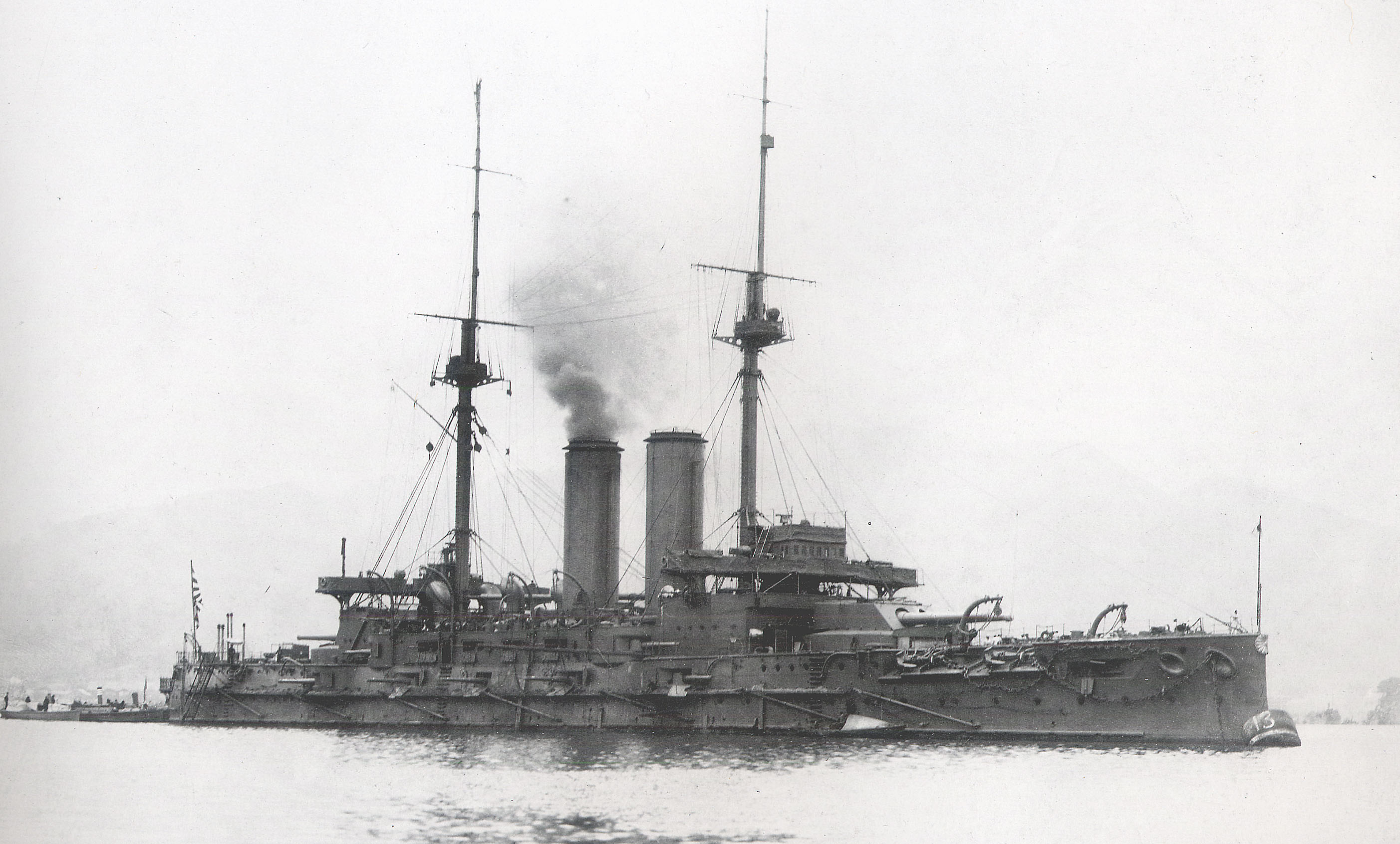
Japanese Admiral Tōgō's flagship, Mikasa

During this time, Admiral Dewa's four cruisers (Chitose, Takasago, Yakumo and Kasagi) came into view, fast approaching from the south at 18 knots (33 km/h; 21 mph), and Tōgō attempted to squeeze Admiral Vitgeft's fleet between the two advancing columns. Just after 13:00, Tōgō attempted to cross Vitgeft's T and commenced firing his main batteries from the extreme range of more than 8 nmi (15 km; 9.2 mi). Vitgeft, with the battleship Retvizan, returned fire, but the range was excessive for both sides and no hits were scored. Tōgō had miscalculated his speed when trying to cross the T and Vitgeft simply made a quick turn to port, maintained his speed, and increased his range from Tōgō's fleet. Within minutes, Vitgeft was again headed for the open sea and Tōgō's pincer move had failed, as Admiral Dewa's cruisers had to turn quickly to avoid Tōgō's battleline, and thus broke contact without having fired a shot. As Tōgō observed Vitgeft's battleline swiftly move past his own in opposite directions, he quickly ordered each warship to turn about individually, which put his cruisers into the lead, but now parallel with Vitgeft's battle line.

At about 13:25, and again at a range of over 8 miles (13 km), Tōgō's battleships opened fire on Vitgeft's flagship and Retvizan, hitting the latter 12 times. By about 13:30 the Russian flagship had returned fire, knocking out Tōgō's wireless communications with two 305-millimetre (12.0 in) shell direct hits at this extreme range. For nearly half an hour the two battleship fleets pounded each other, slowly closing their range, until by 14:05 they reached about 3.5 miles (5.6 km), at which time both fleets let loose with their secondary 155-millimetre (6.1 in) guns. As the fleets continued to pound each other with all available guns, Tōgō's flagship was beginning to feel its wounds, and he tried to turn his vessel a bit, due to the hits she was taking (she ended up being hit 20 times), and urgently tried to have his cruisers engage the Russian battleline. But with his radio shot out, he had to rely on flag signals and radio relays from accompanying warships.

=== Stern chases ===
The Japanese cruisers had re-established contact with the Russian battleline, but were quickly driven off by their 305 mm gunfire. Both battlefleets were maintaining about 14 kn (26 km/h; 16 mph), but again, Vitgeft had managed to get past Tōgō, and the Japanese were forced to commence a stern chase. By 14:45 the Japanese flagship had closed to within about 7 nmi (13 km; 8.1 mi) of the trailing battleship Poltava, which had been unable to maintain her fleet's speed of 14 kn (26 km/h; 16 mph) due to engine trouble. Mikasa and Asahi soon began to pound Poltava, scoring several hits. Admiral Ukhtomsky in the battleship Peresvet observed the plight of Poltava and ordered his division to fall back and help Poltava, and they began concentrating their gunfire onto Mikasa and Asahi. With Admiral Ukhtomsky's division firing, coupled with Poltava rejoining of the fight, Mikasa and Asahi began taking too many hits, and upon the urging of his chief of staff, Tōgō used his superior speed to break contact, race ahead of Vitgeft's fleet, and try to re-establish contact again under more favorable conditions. By 15:20 the range was opened and the firing ceased.

As the battleships had broken contact, Admiral Dewa with his cruisers attempted to get into action, when suddenly the Russian battleships opened up on him. At about 15:40 one 305-millimetre (12 in) shell hit Dewa's armored cruiser, Yakumo, from a range of over 8 nautical miles (15 km; 9.2 mi), which was well out of range of his 203 mm (8 in) guns. Admiral Dewa decided against having his four Japanese cruisers engage with any Russian battleships. By this time, only Tōgō's six warships (four battleships and two armored cruisers) were chasing Vitgeft's ten warships (six battleships and four cruisers). With darkness only three hours away, Admiral Vitgeft believed that he had outranged Admiral Tōgō, and would lose him totally when darkness came. Tōgō knew this too, and ordered a 15-knot (28 km/h; 17 mph) speed to catch up to the tail end of Vitgeft's fleet. By 17:35 hours, Tōgō's warships had closed to within 3.5 nautical miles (6.5 km; 4.0 mi) of the again-lagging battleship Poltava, and opened fire upon her.

Admiral Dewa also showed up with his cruisers, and Tōgō ordered all battleships and cruisers to shell Poltava, hoping to at least sink one Russian battleship. However, the commanding officer of Poltava, Captain Ivan P. Uspenskiy, and his crewmen scored several hits on Admiral Tōgō's flagship. At this time, the Shimose shells loaded inside the 305-millimetre (12 in) guns began detonating prematurely inside the hot gun barrels; knocking out of action one 305-millimetre (12 in) gun on Shikishima at 17:45, and two 305-millimetre (12 in) barrels on Asahi at 18:10 hours. By 18:30, Tōgō had only 11 of his original 16 305-millimetre (12 in) still in action.

=== Hand-off ===
Although the range had dropped to about 3 miles, the secondary batteries of 155 and 203 mm guns were still ineffective, and Poltava and Peresvet, although heavily damaged, were still with the Russian battleline. By 18:30, Tōgō was still having trouble controlling his battleship's gunfire; Shikishima and Asahi were blasting away at the crippled Poltava, Fuji was shooting at Pobeda and Peresvet, while the flagship Mikasa was duelling with the Russian flagship Tsesarevich. No IJN warships were shooting at the Russian battleships Retvizan and Sevastopol, which allowed them to freely blast away at Mikasa. With darkness only 30 minutes away, the Japanese flagship Mikasa almost no longer combat effective, and Russian gunfire seemingly becoming more accurate and effective with each cannon shot; the flagship signaled to Asahi to take over (known as a battle handoff) the shooting upon the lead Russian battleship. Within 10 minutes of being relieved by Asahi, Admiral Tōgō fired a 305 mm salvo into the Russian flagship Tsesarevich, instantly killing Admiral Vitgeft and his immediate staff, and jamming the flagship's steering wheel. The explosion had wedged the wheel into a port turn, sharp enough so that Tsesarevich heeled over 12 degrees. Retvizan, which was unaware of the situation on the flagship, followed in her wake. "By the time Pobeda arrived at the turning point, Tsesarevich had swung around 180 degrees and was heading back into her own line. With no signal to indicate what had happened, the other ships were unaware that Tsesarevich was not only out of control and without its admiral, but was actually without anyone at all in command."

=== Charge of Retvizan ===
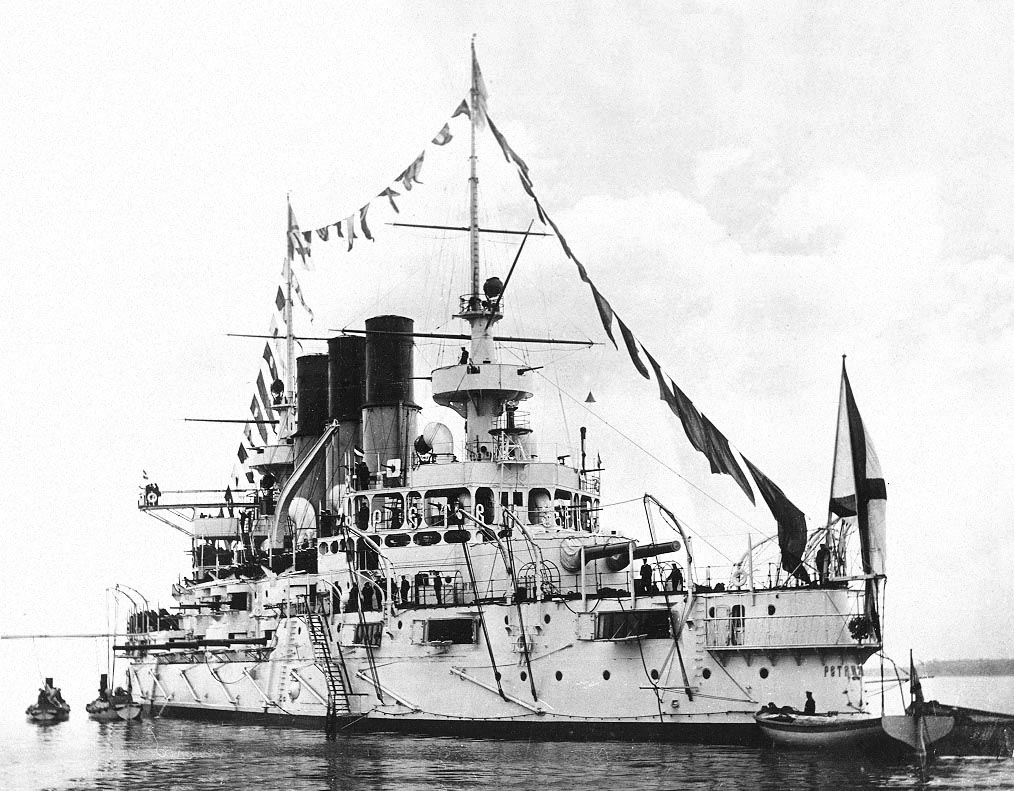
Russian battleship Retvizan, whose captain received severe wounds during the ship's solo charge against the Japanese fleet

Prince Pavel Ukhtomsky of the battleship Peresvet soon realized that the flagship was out of action, and attempted to gain control of the Russian squadron. But a Japanese shell, falling wide, cut the foremast of Peresvet, preventing the signal flags from being hoisted as usual; they had to be hoisted along the bridge instead. Being thus almost hidden from view, the signal apparently was only seen on Sevastopol; no other Russian capital ships followed Ukhtomsky's lead.

At the same time Captain Eduard Schensnovich commanding Retvizan, immediately turned his battleship towards Tōgō's battleline, charging directly into it with all weapons firing, despite being down by the bow from battle damage. Tōgō's battleline shifted their fire onto Retvizan as the range dropped to less than three miles. There were so many shell splashes surrounding the charging battleship, that Japanese gunners were unable to adjust their fire. However, as Tōgō's battleships were running low on 305 mm shells, and many of his main guns were out of action, he decided to play it safe, and with the Russian squadron scattered, he turned the fight over to his cruisers and destroyers.

As Tōgō's ships began their turn, they fired a final salvo, hitting the enemy battleship with several shells, one of which seriously wounded Captain Schensnovich in the stomach. Retvizan laid smoke and also began to turn away, but the battleship had effectively ended the duel between the opposing pre-dreadnoughts, and had saved the flagship from destruction. There was little choice but to give up the attempt to reach Vladivostok and to return to Port Arthur. Even this proved impossible to coordinate, and many ships wandered off on their own.

Two hours later, the bulk of the Russian fleet returned to the relative safety of Port Arthur. Five battleships, a cruiser and ten destroyers made it back. The damaged Tsesarevich and three escorting destroyers sailed to Kiaochou, where they were interned by German authorities. The cruiser Askold and another destroyer sailed to Shanghai and were likewise interned by Chinese authorities. The cruiser Diana escaped to Saigon, where it was interned by the French. Only the small cruiser Novik sailed east around the Japanese home islands to try to reach Vladivostok. On 20 August, Japanese cruisers forced the ship aground at Sakhalin, where it was destroyed by the crew after engaging the Japanese at the Battle of Korsakov.

== Analysis ==
The Battle of the Yellow Sea was naval history's first major confrontation between modern steel battleship fleets, so with the exception of Admiral Tōgō's 20-minute duel with Russian Admiral Stark's battleships at Port Arthur on 9 February 1904, both Vitgeft and Tōgō were new to fighting modern steel battleship fleet actions. Although Admiral Oskar Starck had been replaced by Admiral Stepan Makarov shortly after the Port Arthur battle, Makarov in turn was replaced by Vitgeft, following Makarov's death in April 1904, when his battleship Petropavlovsk blew up and sank in the Yellow Sea, after striking mines. Had Admiral Starck remained in command at the time of the Yellow Sea battle, Admirals Tōgō and Starck would have met on equal terms, both retaining about equal combat experience in battleship fleet actions. But the naval force that Tōgō was to meet at Tsushima the following year was not the same type of battle fleet that he engaged at the Yellow Sea either. Though Admiral Vitgeft was new, many of his men were not, most of them were veterans of Far East duty, with some of them veterans of the 1900 Boxer Rebellion in China; thus they were a highly experienced fighting force.

=== Rangefinders and gunnery ===
During the late 1890s, it was thought that around 3 to 4 miles (4.8 to 6.4 km) would be the norm for battleship engagements due to the limitations of the gun sights and rangefinders available at the time, even though the 305 mm (12.0 in) guns usually mounted to battleships of the period had a considerably longer range. In the Yellow Sea engagement, the Russian battleships had Lugeol rangefinders with a range of 4 kilometres (2.5 mi), while Japanese pre-dreadnoughts had the latest (1903) Barr and Stroud coincidence rangefinders, which had a range of 6 kilometres (3.7 mi). As a result, the naval world was quite surprised after the Yellow Sea combatants opened fire upon one another and scored hits while still over 8 miles (13 km) apart.

The Yellow Sea engagement lasted some 6 to 7 hours, with about 4 of those hours being direct combat. During those nearly four hours of fighting, roughly 7,382 rounds were expended by both sides, ranging in size from 155 to 305 mm shells. Of those 7,382 shells fired, approximately 5,956 had been from 155 mm guns; 3,592 from the Imperial Japanese Navy, and 2,364 from the Imperial Russian Navy. 307 203 mm shells had been fired by the Japanese Navy and none by the Russian fleet. Admiral Vitgeft's fleet had expended 224 254 mm shells compared to Tōgō's 33 shells. The long range gunnery duel that had commenced at a range of over 8 miles, and which began with 305 mm main gun fire, ended with 305 mm gun fire in near darkness, during which time 862 305 mm main gun rounds were fired; 259 from the Russian battleships, and 603 from the Japanese battleships.

== Battle damage and casualties ==
The nearly seven hours of naval combat coupled with the estimated 7,382 fired shells had produced a hit rate of 1.7%. Schensnovich charged his battleship into Admiral Tōgō's battleline, thus ending the battleship fleet duel and saving the Russian flagship from destruction. Schensnovich later died from his wounds received in January 1911, at the age of 57.

Damage and casualties included the following:

Battleship	Primary armament	Waterline armor (Note: Poltava and Sevastopol had Harvey armor; the others had Krupp armor.) (inches)	Year launched	Builder	Damage sustained	Casualties
Tsesarevich, (Flagship)	4 × 12-inch guns 12 × 6-inch guns	9 3/4	1901	Toulon, France	13 305 mm gun hits and two 203 mm hits	12 crewmen killed and 47 crewmen wounded. First Pacific Squadron Admiral Wilgelm Vitgeft killed.
Pobeda	4 × 10-inch guns 11 × 6-inch guns	9	1900	St. Petersburg, Russia	11 large caliber hits	4 crewmen killed and 29 crewmen wounded
Peresvet	4 × 10-inch guns 11 × 6-inch guns	9	1898	St. Petersburg, Russia	39 hits	
Poltava	4 × 12-inch guns 12 × 6-inch guns	14 1/2	1894	St. Petersburg, Russia	12 to 14 hits, 203 to 305 mm guns	12 crewmen killed and 43 crewmen wounded
Retvizan	4 × 12-inch guns 12 × 6-inch guns	9	1900	Philadelphia, United States	18 hits from 203 and 305 mm guns	6 crewmen killed and 42 crewmen wounded
Sevastopol	4 × 12-inch guns 12 × 6-inch guns	14 1/2	1895	St. Petersburg, Russia	Struck by several shells	1 crewman killed and 62 crewmen wounded
Mikasa (Flagship)	4 × 12-inch guns 14 × 6-inch guns	9	1900	Barrow, Great Britain	Hit 20 times and aft 305 mm turret knocked out of action	125 casualties
Asahi	4 × 12-inch guns 14 × 6-inch guns	9	1899	Clydebank, Great Britain	1 305 mm hit near the waterline and both aft 305 mm gun barrels burst	2 crewmen wounded
Shikishima	4 × 12-inch guns 14 × 6-inch guns	9	1898	Thames Iron Works, Great Britain	1 forward 305 mm gun barrel burst	
Yakumo Armoured Cruiser	4 × 8-inch guns 12 × 6-inch guns	7	1899	AG Vulcan Stettin, Stettin, Germany	1 305 mm hit	

=== Aftermath ===
The majority of the Russian squadron (five ships of the line, one cruiser and nine torpedo boats) returned to Port Arthur. The other units were scattered in the darkness and sought out neutral ports, where they were interned until the end of the war. The heavily damaged battleship Tsesarevich arrived at Tsingtau with the three Kit-class destroyers Besposhchadny, Besshumny and Besstrashny, where the ships were interned by the German authorities. Novik also stopped briefly at Tsingtau, but left again to attempt to reach Vladivostok according to the original plan. She was confronted by Japanese cruisers off Korsakow and finally sank herself off Sakhalin. The damaged Askold, flagship of Rear Admiral Reitzenstein, who commanded the cruisers, sailed to Shanghai, where the destroyer Grozovoy, which had initially accompanied Diana, also arrived later. Both were interned by China under Japanese pressure until peace was concluded with Japan. Diana sailed via Haiphong to Saigon until 23 August, where the ship was interned. The torpedo boat Reshitelny, which had sailed for Chifu, was confiscated by the Japanese after neither disarmament nor the intention to return to sea were apparent there.

== See also ==
- Outline of the Russo-Japanese War
- Timeline of the Russo-Japanese War
