= Wilgelm Vitgeft =

Russian Navy officer (1847–1904)

Wilgelm Karlovich Vitgeft
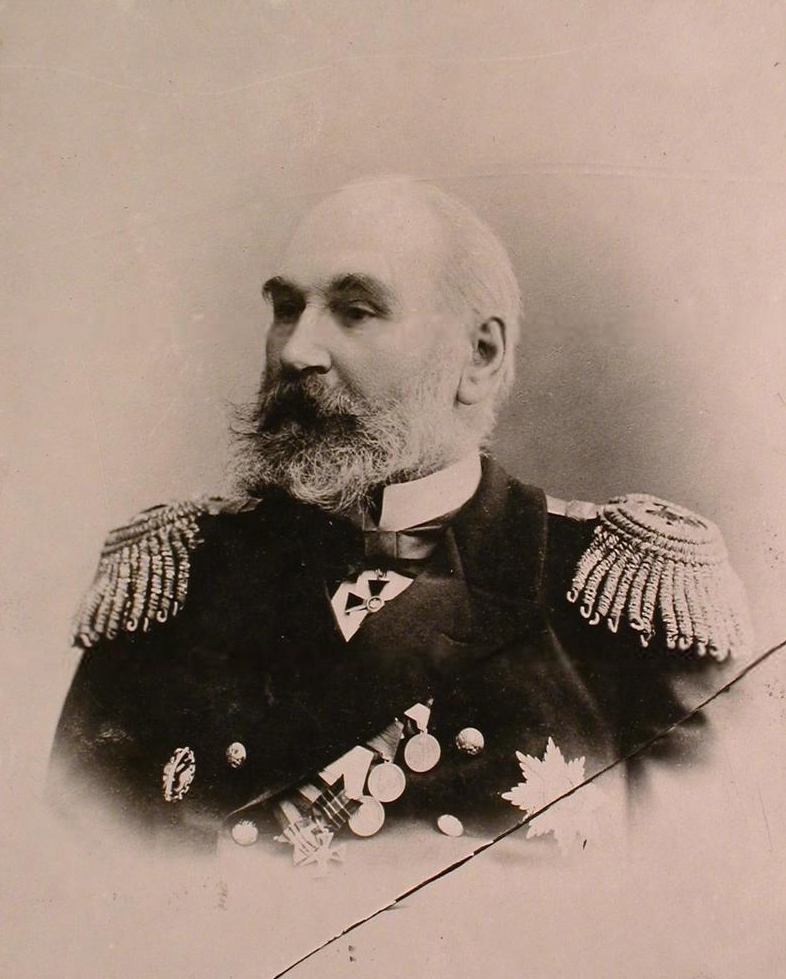
- Rear-admiral Wilhelm Withöft.
- Born: October 14, 1847; Odessa, Kherson Governorate, Russia
- Died: August 10, 1904 (aged 56); Yellow Sea, off of Shandong, China
- Other name: Wilhelm Witthöft
- Military career
- Allegiance: Russia
- Branch: Imperial Russian Navy
- Service years: 1868–1904
- Rank: Rear Admiral
- Commands: 1st Squadron Pacific Fleet
- Conflicts: Boxer Rebellion; Russo-Japanese War; Battle of Port Arthur; Siege of Port Arthur (WIA); Battle of the Yellow Sea †

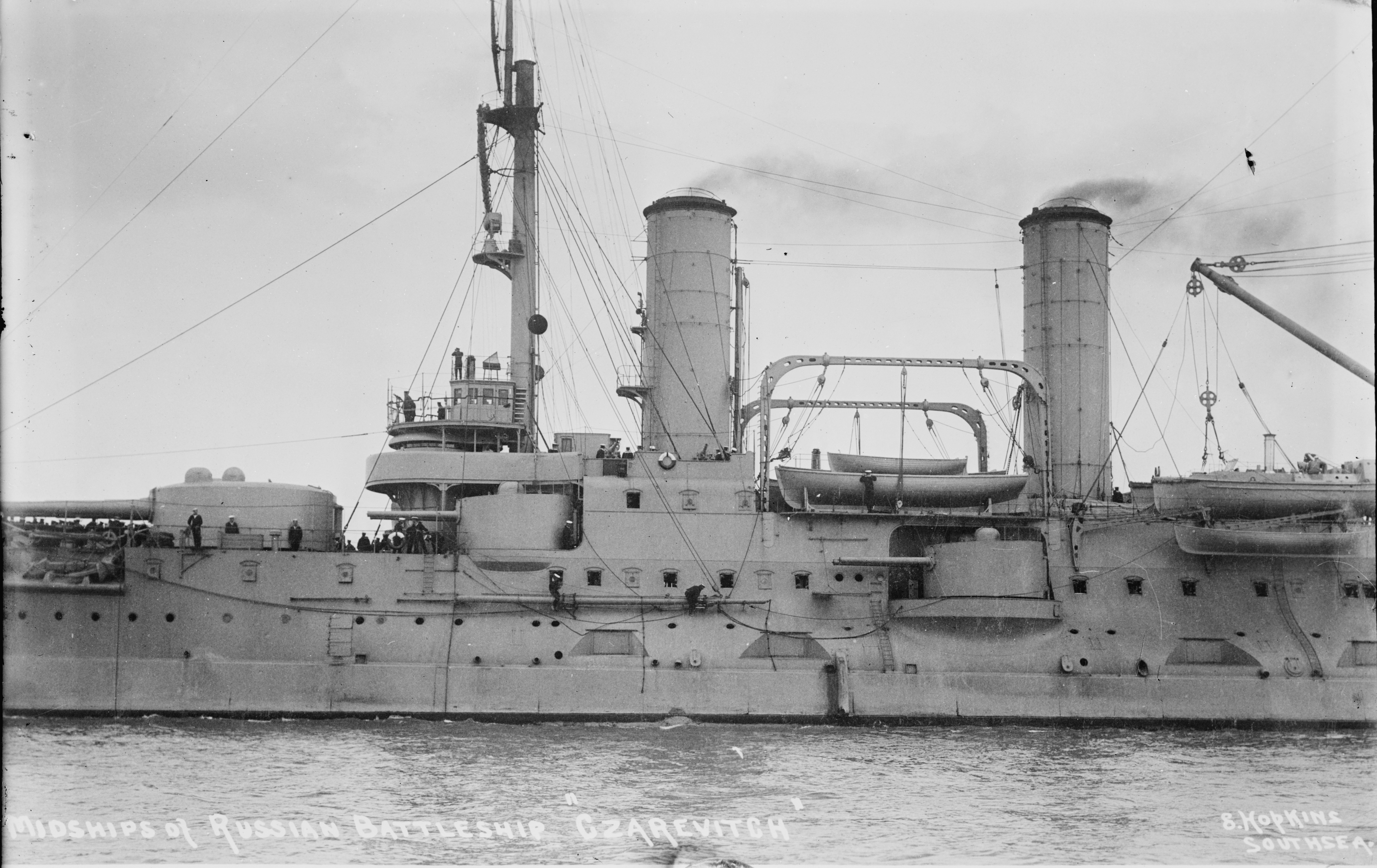
Russian battleship Tsesarevich, flagship of the Battle of the Yellow Sea.

Wilhelm Withöft (Russian: Вильгельм Карлович Витгефт, romanized: Vilgelm Karlovich Vitgeft; October 14, 1847 – August 10, 1904), commonly known as Wilgelm Vitgeft, was a Russo-German admiral in the Imperial Russian Navy, noted for his service in the Russo-Japanese War of 1904-1905.

== Biography ==
Withöft was born in Odessa, and was of German ancestry and Lutheran faith. He graduated from the Sea Cadet Corps in 1868 and subsequently circumnavigated the globe on the clipper Wsadnik. After his return to Russia, he was promoted to warrant officer in 1870 and to lieutenant in 1873. From 1875 to 1878 he received specialized training as a naval artillery and mine warfare expert. Thereafter he served in various functions on ships of the Russian Baltic Fleet. In 1885, as a captain of the second rank, he was assigned his first command, that of the gunboat Groza. He subsequently served as an inspector of works for the Marine Technical Committee, and as the Assistant Chief Inspector of Mines, was responsible for testing naval mines.

In 1892, Vitgeft took over command of the cruiser Voyevoda and was promoted to captain 1st rank in 1894. On 26 October 1899 Withöft was promoted to rear admiral and was transferred to the Russian Pacific Fleet. He was awarded the Order of St. Stanislaus (1st class with Swords) for participation in the Russian-Chinese War of 1900, and was also decorated by the Empire of Japan with the Order of the Rising Sun, 2nd class. He served as chief of staff to Viceroy, Yevgeny Alekseyev, from 1900 to 1903.

After the outbreak of the Russo-Japanese War of 1904–1905, Vitgeft became chief of the Naval Headquarters in the Far East. Following the death of Admiral Stepan Makarov, Vitgeft was appointed temporary commander of the "First Pacific Squadron", that portion of the Russian Pacific Fleet trapped at Port Arthur by the Japanese blockade. Vitgeft made one aborted attempt to break out of Port Arthur on 23 June. On 7 August, he suffered from a leg wound caused by a shell splinter during the Japanese bombardment of Port Arthur.

Viceroy Alekseyev, an admiral, favored an aggressive sortie so as to enable the First Pacific Squadron to link up with the Vladivostok Squadron and thereby create a naval force powerful enough to challenge the Japanese fleet. Vitgeft believed "in a fleet in being", which simply stayed at anchor, while at the same time contributing some of his weaponry to the land battle as the safest course to follow. Although passive, Vitgeft's preference was actually more in keeping with the Russian Navy's doctrine, which was building up strength (waiting for the arrival of the Russian Baltic Fleet, renamed as the "2nd Pacific Squadron"), and then engaging the Japanese navy in decisive battle.

Alekseyev appealed to St. Petersburg, and Tsar Nicholas II replied that he fully shared the Viceroy's opinion. Faced with an Imperial writ and threat of legal action, Admiral Vitgeft was ordered to sail for Vladivostok immediately. By 06:15 hours, on 10 August 1904, Admiral Vitgeft, flying his flag in the battleship Tsesarevich, began leading his fleet from the harbor.

The Russian fleet consisted of the battleships Tsesarevich, Retvizan, Pobeda, Peresvet, Sevastopol, and Poltava, the protected cruisers Askold, Diana, Novik and Pallada, and 14 destroyers. In the subsequent Battle of the Yellow Sea, the Imperial Japanese Navy's Combined Fleet under Admiral Togo Heihachiro intercepted the Russian fleet. At 18:40 on 10 August 1904, Admiral Vitgeft and his immediate staff were killed instantly when a 12-inch (305 mm) salvo from the Japanese battleship Asahi struck the upper bridge of the Russian flagship Tsesarevich. The shell also jammed the flagship's steering into a shaft port turn, which threw the Russian line of battle into confusion. Five battleships, a cruiser and nine destroyers escaped back to Port Arthur; however, the damaged Tsesarevich and three escorting destroyers sailed to Qingdao, where they were interned by Imperial German authorities under Governor Oskar von Truppel and his chief of staff Korvettenkapitän Felix Funke.

== Honors ==
- Order of St. Anne 2nd degree 1893
- Order of St Vladimir 4th degree, 1893 .
- Order of St Vladimir 3rd degree, 1898 .
- Order of St. Stanislaus 1st degree with swords, 1900
- Order of the Redeemer, 3rd degree, 1896 (Greece)
- Order of the Rising Sun, 2nd degree, 1900 (Japan)
- Order of the Crown, 2nd degree with star and swords, 1900 (Prussia)

== Sources ==
- "Витгефт, Вильгельм Карлович" . Brockhaus and Efron Encyclopedic Dictionary (in Russian). 1906.
- Forczyk, Robert. Russian Battleship vs Japanese Battleship, Yellow Sea 1904-05. 2009 Osprey. ISBN 978-1-84603-330-8.
- Kowner, Rotem (2006). Historical Dictionary of the Russo-Japanese War. Scarecrow. ISBN 0-8108-4927-5
