= Outline of the Russo-Japanese War =

Russo-Japanese War
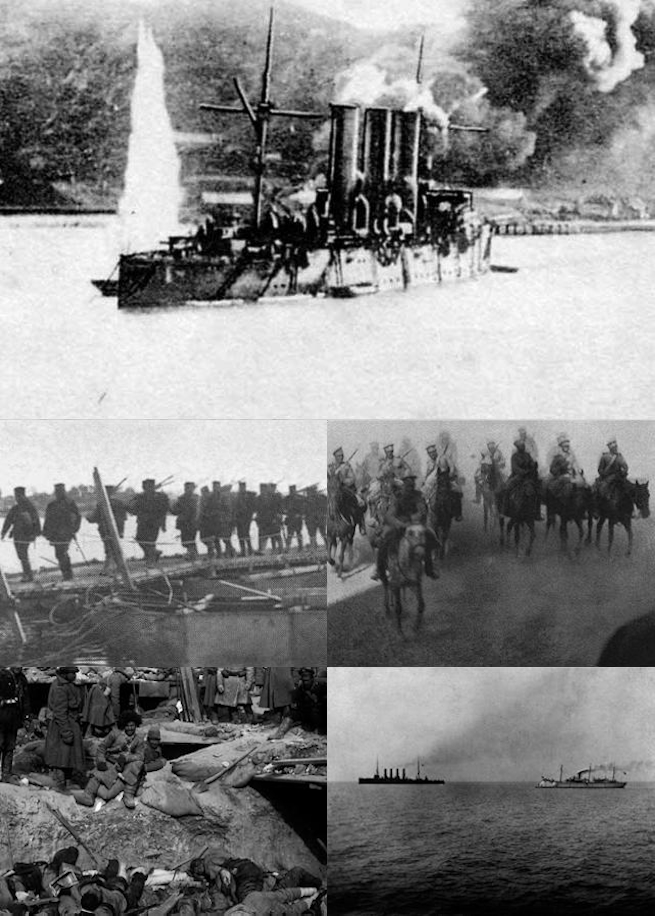
- Clockwise from top: Russian cruiser Pallada under fire at Port Arthur, Russian cavalry at Mukden, Russian cruiser Varyag and gunboat Korietz at Chemulpo Bay, Japanese dead at Port Arthur, Japanese infantry crossing the Yalu River
Date	8 February 1904 – 5 September 1905 (1 year, 6 months and 4 weeks)
Location	Manchuria, Yellow Sea, Korea, Sea of Japan
Result	Japanese victory
Territorial changes	Russia cedes Port Arthur and Dalniy in the Liaodong peninsula, Southern Sakhalin, and the control of the South Manchuria Railway to Japan; Kvantunskaya Oblast and Southern Sakhalin become Kwantung Leased Territory and Karafuto Prefecture respectively

The following outline is provided as an overview of and topical guide to English Wikipedia articles about the Russo-Japanese War.

The Russo-Japanese War (Note: Russian: Русско-японская война, romanized: Russko-yaponskaya voyna; Japanese: 日露戦争, romanized: Nichi-ro sensō) (8 February 1904 – 5 September 1905) was fought between the Russian Empire and the Empire of Japan over rival imperial ambitions in Manchuria and the Korean Empire. The major land battles of the war were fought on the Liaodong Peninsula and near Mukden in Southern Manchuria, with naval battles taking place in the Yellow Sea and the Sea of Japan.

== Overviews ==
- Russo-Japanese War – 1904–1905 war between Japan and Russia over imperial ambitions in East Asia
- Treaty of Portsmouth – 1905 peace treaty ending the Russo-Japanese War
- Bibliography of the Russo-Japanese War – Comprehensive list of books and scholarly works about the Russo-Japanese War.
- Timeline of the Russo-Japanese War – Chronological timeline of the Russo-Japanese War from 1904 to 1905

== Background ==
- Triple Intervention – 1895 diplomatic move that reshaped Japanese ambitions before the war
- Manchuria–Mongolia problem – Diplomatic and territorial disputes in Northeast Asia influenced by the Russo-Japanese War aftermath.
- The First Sino-Japanese War (1894–1895), between China (Qing dynasty) and Japan (Empire of Japan), primarily over control of Korea

== Aftermath and impact ==
- Hibiya incendiary incident – anti-government riot in Tokyo in response to the Treaty of Portsmouth
- Manchuria–Mongolia problem – geopolitical dispute in the region after the war
- Taishō Democracy – period of liberal reform in Japan partly influenced by postwar conditions

== Religious and ceremonial ==
- Daigensuihō – imperial rite conducted by the Japanese emperor in wartime
- Theotokos of Port Arthur – Russian Orthodox icon associated with the war
- Defenders of Port Arthur Medal (est. 1905) – Japanese military decoration awarded to participants in the defense of Port Arthur.
- Port Arthur Cross (est. 1905) – Russian military award given for bravery in the defense of Port Arthur.
- Russo-Japanese War Medal – Japanese campaign medal awarded to soldiers and sailors who participated in the war.

== Locations and geography ==
- Hill 203 – site of intense fighting during the Siege of Port Arthur
- Dongjiguan Mountain – key strategic location during the Siege of Port Arthur
- Shuishiying – Russian naval headquarters located near Port Arthur.

== Lists ==
- List of warships sunk during the Russo-Japanese War – compilation of naval losses in the conflict
- List of battles of the Russo-Japanese War – overview of all major land and naval engagements

== Cultural and media ==
- Battle of the Japan Sea (film) (1969) – Japanese war film depicting the Battle of Tsushima during the Russo-Japanese War.
- The Breath of the Gods (1920) – Silent film portraying cultural and military aspects of Japan around the time of the Russo-Japanese War.
- Saka no Ue no Kumo (TV series) (2009–2011) – Japanese television drama depicting events of the Russo-Japanese War.

== Other topics ==
- Shuishiying – Qing military garrison involved in the conflict
- Honghuzi – Chinese irregulars involved in the war, often harassing Russian forces
- Defenders of Port Arthur Medal – Russian medal awarded for the defense of Port Arthur
- Russo-Japanese War Medal – Japanese military decoration awarded for service
- Z flag – naval signal flag famously raised by Admiral Tōgō before the Battle of Tsushima
- Chinese torpedo boat Fulong – Chinese naval vessel captured and used by Japan
- Honghuzi – Chinese bandits and guerrillas who played a role in the border conflicts related to the war.
- Spanish cruiser Rapido – Auxiliary naval asset involved indirectly in related conflicts.

== Historiography and memory ==
- Bibliography of the Russo-Japanese War – list of scholarly works and sources on the conflict

== Events and battles ==
=== Land battles ===
- Raid on Yingkou (1904) – Japanese offensive operation against Russian supply lines during the war.
- Battle of Hsimucheng (10 July 1904) – Japanese victory over Russian forces in eastern Manchuria
- Battle of Liaoyang (24 August – 4 September 1904) – one of the largest land battles of the war, fought in August–September 1904
- Battle of Motien Pass (10 July 1904) – early clash securing Japanese control of a strategic mountain pass
- Battle of Mukden (20 February – 10 March 1905) – massive battle and turning point ending in Russian retreat
- Battle of Nanshan (25 May 1904) – bloody assault securing Japanese advance toward Port Arthur
- Siege of Port Arthur (30 July 1904 – 2 January 1905) – prolonged siege of Russia’s key naval stronghold
- Raid on Yingkou (May 1904) – Japanese naval action targeting Russian logistics
- Japanese invasion of Sakhalin (7–31 July 1905) – final campaign capturing Russian island territory
- Battle of Sandepu (25–29 January 1905) – inconclusive winter battle in January 1905
- Battle of Shaho (5–17 October 1904) – costly engagement with no clear victor in October 1904
- Battle of Tashihchiao (24–25 July 1904) – Japanese tactical victory in July 1904
- Battle of Te-li-Ssu (14–15 June 1904) – early Japanese success driving Russian forces from the field
- Battle of the Yalu River (1904) (30 April – 1 May 1904) – first major land battle, marking Japanese offensive into Manchuria

=== Naval battles ===
- List of warships sunk during the Russo-Japanese War – Record of naval vessels lost by both sides during the conflict.
- Raid on Yingkou (May 1904) – Japanese naval raid during the war
- Battle of Chemulpo Bay (9 February 1904) – Japanese naval victory early in the war off the Korean coast
- Dogger Bank incident (21–22 October 1904) – mistaken Russian attack on British fishing vessels en route to Asia
- Hitachi Maru Incident (15 June 1904) – Russian interception and sinking of Japanese troop transports
- Battle of Korsakov (20 August 1904) – naval skirmish near Sakhalin during the final phase of the war
- Battle of Port Arthur (8–9 February 1904) – initial naval clash marking the outbreak of the war
- Battle of Tsushima order of battle (27–28 May 1905) – listing of ships and formations in the decisive battle
- Battle of Tsushima (27–28 May 1905) – decisive naval engagement ending Russian naval presence in East Asia
- Battle off Ulsan (14 August 1904) – clash between Russian Vladivostok squadron and Japanese cruisers
- Battle of the Yellow Sea (10 August 1904) – major fleet engagement during breakout attempt from Port Arthur

== Military assets ==
=== Russian military assets ===
- 6-inch siege gun M1877 – A heavy artillery piece used during the siege of Port Arthur.
- 8-inch mortar M1877 – A large-caliber mortar employed in coastal defense and siege operations.
- 9-inch mortar M1877 – A heavy mortar used by Russian forces for siege warfare.
- 11-inch mortar M1877 – A massive mortar utilized in the defense of key positions.
- 42-line field gun M1877 – A field artillery piece used by the Russian army during the conflict.
- 42-line fortress and siege gun Pattern of 1877 – A large-caliber gun used in fortifications and sieges.
- 75 mm 50 caliber Pattern 1892 – A naval gun developed in France and used by Russia during the war.
- 76 mm divisional gun M1902 – A field gun developed by the Putilov Works in Saint Petersburg.
- 76 mm gun M1900 – A light quick-firing field gun used in various conflicts.
- 87 mm light field gun M1877 – A light artillery piece used by Russian forces.
- 120 mm howitzer Model 1901 – A heavy howitzer used in siege and bombardment roles.
- 120 mm 45 caliber Pattern 1892 – A naval gun used by the Russian Empire during the war.
- 6 inch 35 caliber naval gun 1877 – A naval gun used by Russian warships.
- 152 mm 45 caliber Pattern 1892 – A coastal defense gun used during the conflict.
- 203 mm 45 caliber Pattern 1892 – A large-caliber gun used in coastal fortifications.
- 254 mm 45 caliber Pattern 1891 – A massive gun used in coastal defense.
- 11-inch gun M1877 – A heavy artillery piece used during the war.
- Russian 12-inch 40-caliber naval gun – A large-caliber naval gun used by Russian warships.

==== Russian naval assets ====
- Borodino-class battleship (commissioned 1901–1903) – Class of battleships built for the Imperial Russian Navy; most were lost or severely damaged at the Battle of Tsushima.
- Imperator Aleksandr II-class battleship (commissioned 1887–1889) – Class of pre-dreadnought battleships active during the war.
- Peresvet-class battleship (commissioned 1901–1903) – Class of fast battleships intended for long-range operations; suffered losses in the war.
- Petropavlovsk-class battleship (commissioned 1897–1899) – Class of battleships serving in the Pacific Fleet.
- Bayan-class cruiser (commissioned 1902) – Class of armored cruisers; saw action in major naval battles including the Battle of Tsushima.

===== Russian Battleships =====
- Russian battleship Borodino (commissioned 1901) – Lead ship of the Borodino-class; sunk at the Battle of Tsushima.
- Russian battleship Imperator Aleksandr II (commissioned 1887) – Battleship that served in the Pacific Fleet; involved in combat and blockade duties.
- Russian battleship Imperator Aleksandr III (1901) (commissioned 1903) – Battleship; participated in fleet operations.
- Russian battleship Imperator Nikolai I (1889) (commissioned 1891) – Battleship; took part in early engagements of the war.
- Russian battleship Knyaz Suvorov (commissioned 1903) – Flagship of the Russian Baltic Fleet; sunk at the Battle of Tsushima.
- Russian battleship Navarin (commissioned 1895) – Battleship of the Baltic Fleet; fought in the Battle of Tsushima and was sunk.
- Russian battleship Oslyabya (commissioned 1898) – First Russian battleship built of Krupp armor; sunk at the Battle of Tsushima.
- Russian battleship Peresvet (commissioned 1901) – Lead ship of the Peresvet-class; participated in the Battle of Tsushima and was sunk.
- Russian battleship Petropavlovsk (1894) (commissioned 1897) – Flagship of the Pacific Squadron; sunk after hitting mines in 1904.
- Russian battleship Pobeda (commissioned 1904) – Battleship; joined the fleet late in the war.
- Russian battleship Poltava (1894) (commissioned 1899) – Battleship; severely damaged during the Battle of Tsushima.
- Russian battleship Retvizan (commissioned 1900) – Modern battleship; heavily damaged at the Battle of the Yellow Sea but survived.
- Russian battleship Sissoi Veliky (commissioned 1896) – Battleship of the Baltic Fleet; sunk at the Battle of Tsushima.
- Russian battleship Tsesarevich (commissioned 1901) – Flagship of the Baltic Fleet; severely damaged at the Battle of the Yellow Sea but escaped to Manila.

===== Russian Cruisers =====
- Russian cruiser Admiral Nakhimov (1885) (commissioned 1888) – Armored cruiser; participated in fleet operations, notably in the Pacific.
- Russian cruiser Askold (commissioned 1901) – Protected cruiser; involved in reconnaissance and fleet engagements.
- Russian cruiser Aurora (commissioned 1903) – Protected cruiser; took part in patrols and battles during the war.
- Russian cruiser Bayan (1900) (commissioned 1900) – Lead ship of the Bayan-class; active in combat and fleet operations.
- Russian cruiser Bogatyr (commissioned 1902) – Protected cruiser; engaged in naval battles and escort duties.
- Russian cruiser Boyarin (commissioned 1901) – Auxiliary cruiser; used for reconnaissance and transport.
- Russian cruiser Diana (commissioned 1897) – Protected cruiser; participated in fleet actions including the Battle of the Yellow Sea.
- Russian cruiser Dmitrii Donskoi (commissioned 1883) – Armored cruiser; took part in Pacific Squadron actions.
- Russian cruiser Gromoboi (commissioned 1899) – Armored cruiser; saw combat in fleet battles.
- Russian cruiser Izumrud (commissioned 1901) – Protected cruiser; performed scouting and escort duties.
- Russian cruiser Oleg (commissioned 1903) – Protected cruiser; engaged in battles and patrols.
- Russian cruiser Pallada (1899) (commissioned 1900) – Protected cruiser; participated in the Battle of the Yellow Sea; later scuttled.
- Spanish cruiser Rapido (commissioned 1889) – Auxiliary cruiser; leased to Russia during the war for patrols.
- Russian cruiser Rossia (commissioned 1896) – Armored cruiser; flagship of the Pacific Squadron before the war; active in naval engagements.
- Russian cruiser Rurik (1892) (commissioned 1896) – Armored cruiser; participated in the Battle of the Yellow Sea.
- Russian cruiser Terek (commissioned 1901) – Protected cruiser; served in reconnaissance and fleet duties.
- Russian cruiser Varyag (1899) (commissioned 1901) – Protected cruiser; famously fought at the Battle of Chemulpo Bay.
- Russian cruiser Vladimir Monomakh (commissioned 1903) – Armored cruiser; participated in fleet actions.
- Russian cruiser Zhemchug (commissioned 1903) – Protected cruiser; saw action in fleet battles.

===== Other Russian naval assets =====
- Russian coast defense ship Admiral Seniavin (commissioned 1894) – Coastal defense ship; participated in the defense of Port Arthur and engaged Japanese forces.
- Russian coast defense ship Admiral Ushakov (commissioned 1893) – Coastal defense ship; took part in defensive operations during the siege of Port Arthur.
- Russian coast defense ship General-Admiral Apraksin (commissioned 1896) – Coastal defense ship; engaged in harbor defense and bombardments.
- Smolensk (1901 ship) (commissioned 1903) – Protected cruiser; involved in patrol and escort operations.
- SS Dekabrist (launched 1902) – Russian merchant ship requisitioned as auxiliary cruiser for patrol and escort duties.
- Russian submarine Delfin (commissioned 1904) – Russia's first combat submarine; limited operations during the war.
- Russian submarine Forel (commissioned 1903) – Early Russian submarine; used primarily for experimental and defensive roles.
- Russian gunboat Korietz (commissioned 1896) – Gunboat involved in coastal defense and combat; notable for engagement with Japanese forces at the start of the war.
- Russian destroyer Reshitel'nyi (commissioned 1903) – Destroyer; captured by Japan and incorporated into the Imperial Japanese Navy.
- Russian gunboat Sivuch (1884) (commissioned 1885) – Gunboat active in coastal patrol and defense operations.
- Russian destroyer Steregushchiy (1903) (commissioned 1904) – Destroyer sunk early in the war during combat operations.
- Russian merchant cruiser Ural (converted 1904) – Merchant vessel converted to armed cruiser for patrol and escort.

=== Japanese military assets ===
- 7 cm mountain gun – A field gun used by the Imperial Japanese Army for mountain warfare during the Russo-Japanese War.
- 28 cm howitzer L/10 – A heavy siege howitzer employed by Japanese forces during the siege of Port Arthur.
- Armstrong Whitworth 12-inch 40-calibre naval gun – A large-caliber naval gun used on Japanese warships during the conflict.
- EOC 10 inch 40 caliber – A coastal defense gun used by Japan during the Russo-Japanese War.
- Guntō – A traditional Japanese sword used by officers and soldiers during the war.
- Madsen machine gun – A light machine gun used by Japanese forces during the conflict.
- Murata rifle – The standard-issue rifle for the Imperial Japanese Army at the start of the Russo-Japanese War.
- QF 3-pounder Hotchkiss – A quick-firing naval gun used by Japanese warships during the war.
- QF 6-pounder Hotchkiss – A naval gun employed on Japanese vessels during the Russo-Japanese War.
- QF 6-inch naval gun – A medium-caliber naval gun used by the Imperial Japanese Navy.
- QF 12-pounder 12 cwt naval gun – A light naval gun mounted on Japanese warships during the conflict.
- Smith & Wesson Model 3 – A revolver used by Japanese officers during the Russo-Japanese War.
- Type 26 revolver – The standard-issue sidearm for Japanese infantry officers during the war.
- Type 30 rifle – A bolt-action rifle used by the Imperial Japanese Army during the Russo-Japanese War.
- Type 31 75 mm mountain gun – A mountain artillery piece used by Japanese forces in mountainous terrains.

==== Japanese naval assets ====
- Matsushima-class cruiser – Class of three armored cruisers including Matsushima, involved in naval engagements.
- Izumo-class cruiser (commissioned 1900–1901) – Class of armored cruisers including Izumo and Iwate; heavily involved in fleet battles.

===== Japanese Battleships =====
- Japanese battleship Asahi – A pre-dreadnought battleship of the Imperial Japanese Navy, commissioned in 1900. It participated in various naval operations during the Russo-Japanese War.
- Dingyuan-class ironclad – A class of ironclad warships built for the Imperial Chinese Navy, which were involved in the conflict.
- Japanese battleship Fuji – A pre-dreadnought battleship of the Imperial Japanese Navy, commissioned in 1901. It played a significant role in the Battle of Tsushima.
- Japanese battleship Hatsuse – A pre-dreadnought battleship of the Imperial Japanese Navy, commissioned in 1902. It was sunk during the Battle of the Yellow Sea.
- Japanese battleship Mikasa – The flagship of the Imperial Japanese Navy during the Russo-Japanese War. It played a pivotal role in the Battle of Tsushima.
- Japanese battleship Shikishima – A pre-dreadnought battleship of the Imperial Japanese Navy, commissioned in 1901. It participated in several naval engagements during the war.
- Japanese battleship Yashima – A pre-dreadnought battleship of the Imperial Japanese Navy, commissioned in 1904. It was involved in the Battle of Tsushima.
- Chinese ironclad Zhenyuan – An ironclad warship of the Imperial Chinese Navy, which was captured by Japan during the conflict and commissioned into the Imperial Japanese Navy as the IJN Zhenyuan.

===== Japanese Cruisers =====
- Japanese cruiser Akashi (commissioned 1901) – Protected cruiser; served in patrolling and escort duties during the war.
- Japanese cruiser Akitsushima (commissioned 1892) – Protected cruiser; engaged in reconnaissance and support roles.
- Japanese cruiser Azuma (commissioned 1900) – Armored cruiser; took part in major naval battles including the Battle of Tsushima.
- Japanese cruiser Chihaya (commissioned 1901) – Fast protected cruiser; used for scouting and dispatch.
- Japanese cruiser Chitose (commissioned 1900) – Protected cruiser; participated in fleet actions and patrols.
- Japanese cruiser Chiyoda (commissioned 1900) – Protected cruiser; served in scouting and fleet screening.
- Chilean cruiser Esmeralda (1883) (commissioned 1884; acquired by Japan in 1894) – Protected cruiser; used mainly for training but also involved in war patrols.
- Japanese cruiser Hashidate (commissioned 1899) – Protected cruiser; performed reconnaissance and escort missions.
- Japanese cruiser Itsukushima (commissioned 1898) – Protected cruiser; participated in blockades and fleet support.
- Japanese cruiser Iwate (commissioned 1901) – Armored cruiser; took part in major battles, notably Tsushima.
- Japanese cruiser Izumo (commissioned 1900) – Armored cruiser; engaged in fleet battles including Tsushima.
- Chinese cruiser Jiyuan (commissioned 1897; captured and commissioned by Japan in 1898) – Protected cruiser; used in secondary roles during the war.
- Japanese cruiser Kasagi (commissioned 1900) – Protected cruiser; served in reconnaissance and fleet actions.
- Japanese cruiser Kasuga (commissioned 1904) – Armored cruiser; participated in combat operations and battles.
- Japanese cruiser Matsushima (commissioned 1892) – Armored cruiser; flagship of the fleet, participated in key battles.
- Japanese cruiser Miyako (commissioned 1900) – Protected cruiser; used for scouting and patrol.
- Japanese cruiser Naniwa (commissioned 1886) – Protected cruiser; actively participated in the war including the Battle of the Yellow Sea.
- Japanese cruiser Niitaka (commissioned 1902) – Protected cruiser; performed patrol and escort duties.
- Japanese cruiser Nisshin (commissioned 1904) – Armored cruiser; arrived during the war and participated in major naval battles.
- Japanese cruiser Otowa (commissioned 1904) – Protected cruiser; performed reconnaissance and escort missions.
- Japanese cruiser Suma (commissioned 1895) – Protected cruiser; engaged in coastal patrol and support.
- Japanese cruiser Takachiho (commissioned 1899) – Protected cruiser; participated in fleet operations.
- Japanese cruiser Takao (1888) (commissioned 1888) – Protected cruiser in naval engagements.
- Japanese cruiser Takasago (commissioned 1899) – Protected cruiser; served in major battles including Tsushima.
- Japanese cruiser Tatsuta (1894) (commissioned 1894) – Protected cruiser; scouting and fleet actions.
- Japanese cruiser Tokiwa (commissioned 1901) – Armored cruiser; engaged in fleet battles and blockades.
- Japanese cruiser Tsugaru (commissioned 1904) – Protected cruiser; took part in naval patrols and support.
- Japanese cruiser Tsukushi (commissioned 1892) – Reconnaissance.
- Japanese cruiser Tsushima (commissioned 1904) – Protected cruiser; involved in reconnaissance and fleet engagements.
- Japanese cruiser Yaeyama (commissioned 1897) – Protected cruiser; performed patrol and support roles.
- Japanese cruiser Yakumo (commissioned 1900) – Armored cruiser; fought in key battles including Tsushima.
- Japanese cruiser Yoshino (commissioned 1892) – Protected cruiser; sank after collision during the war.

==== Japanese destroyers ====
- Japanese destroyer Akatsuki (1901) (commissioned 1901) – Escort and patrol missions.
- Japanese destroyer Akatsuki (1905) (commissioned 1905) – Limited involvement; commissioned near war's end.
- Akatsuki-class destroyer (1901) (commissioned 1901) – Fleet screening and patrol.
- Japanese destroyer Asashio (1902) (commissioned 1902) – Escort and reconnaissance.
- Harusame-class destroyer (commissioned 1902–1904) – Escort and patrol duties.
- Ikazuchi-class destroyer (commissioned 1899–1900) – Patrol and screening.
- Japanese destroyer Kasumi (1902) (commissioned 1902) – Escort and reconnaissance.
- Japanese destroyer Kagerō (1899) (commissioned 1899) – Escort and patrol.
- Japanese destroyer Murakumo (1898) (commissioned 1898) – Fleet screening.
- Murakumo-class destroyer (commissioned 1898–1900) – Fleet screening and patrol.
- Japanese destroyer Sazanami (1899) (commissioned 1899) – Scouting and escort.
- Japanese destroyer Shinonome (1898) (commissioned 1898) – Fleet screening and patrol.
- Japanese destroyer Shirakumo (1901) (commissioned 1901) – Escort duties.
- Shirakumo-class destroyer (commissioned 1901–1902) – Escort and patrol.
- Japanese destroyer Shiranui (1899) (commissioned 1899) – Fleet screening.
- Japanese destroyer Usugumo (1900) (commissioned 1900) – Escort and patrol.
- Japanese destroyer Yūgiri (1899) (commissioned 1899) – Naval operations.

==== Other Japanese naval assets ====
- Japanese gunboat Akagi (commissioned 1898) – River patrol and escort duties.
- Japanese gunboat Atago (commissioned 1898) – Coastal operations and patrol.
- Japanese gunboat Banjō (commissioned 1890) – Patrol and escort.
- Japanese gunboat Chōkai (commissioned 1899) – Coastal defense and river patrols.
- Japanese gunboat Maya (commissioned 1898) – Coastal patrol and support.
- Japanese gunboat Ōshima (commissioned 1899) – Patrol and escort missions.
- Japanese gunboat Uji (1903) (commissioned 1903) – Patrol and escort.
- Japanese corvette Amagi (commissioned 1883) – Training and coastal defense.
- Japanese corvette Kaimon (commissioned 1892) – Training and coastal defense.
- Japanese corvette Katsuragi (commissioned 1886) – Coastal patrol.
- Japanese corvette Musashi (commissioned 1886) – Training and limited combat.
- Japanese corvette Tenryū (commissioned 1883) – Coastal patrol.
- Japanese corvette Yamato (commissioned 1885) – Training and coastal defense.
- Japanese ironclad Hiei (commissioned 1877) – Early fleet engagement role.
- Japanese ironclad Kongō (commissioned 1878) – Active in fleet battles.
- America Maru (acquired 1904) – Auxiliary cruiser for patrol and transport support.
- Saikyō Maru (requisitioned 1904) – Auxiliary cruiser for transport and patrol.
- Shinano Maru (1900) (commissioned 1900) – Armed merchant cruiser for scouting.
- Chinese ironclad Pingyuan (commissioned 1890) – Captured and used by Japan in support roles.
- Russian destroyer Reshitel'nyi (commissioned 1903) – Captured and commissioned into Japanese navy.
- Japanese seaplane carrier Wakamiya (commissioned 1914, but converted during the Russo-Japanese War era) – Early Japanese seaplane carrier; used for reconnaissance and limited air operations (note: formal commissioning date post-dates war but precursor vessels and aircraft operations began).

== Individuals ==
=== Japanese ===
- Emperor Meiji (Japanese: 明治天皇) – Japanese emperor during the war; symbol of modernization and national unity
- Tōgō Heihachirō (Japanese: 東郷 平八郎) – commander of the Japanese Combined Fleet, key figure in the war

==== Japanese political figures ====
- Hayashi Gonsuke (diplomat) (Japanese: 林権助) – Japanese diplomat who signed the Treaty of Portsmouth
- Itō Hirobumi (Japanese: 伊藤博文) – elder statesman and political advisor during the war
- Kaneko Kentarō (Japanese: 金子堅太郎) – Japanese diplomat who lobbied in the U.S. during peace negotiations
- Katsura Tarō (Japanese: 桂太郎) – Japanese prime minister throughout the war
- Komura Jutarō (Japanese: 小村壽太郎) – foreign minister and chief peace negotiator at Portsmouth
- Sone Arasuke (Japanese: 曽禰荒助) – high-ranking Meiji statesman involved in colonial administration
- Suematsu Kenchō (Japanese: 末松謙澄) – diplomat and publicist of Japan’s wartime position in Europe
- Takahira Kogorō (Japanese: 高平小五郎) – Japanese ambassador to the U.S. during the conflict
- Yamaza Enjirō (Japanese: 山座円次郎) – foreign ministry official assisting in treaty negotiations

==== Japanese military figures ====
- Gōtarō Mikami – military surgeon awarded honors for battlefield service
- Terauchi Masatake – army general and future Resident-General of Korea
- Yamagata Aritomo – military elder and strategist influencing wartime planning
- Yamamoto Gonnohyōe – admiral and navy minister influential in naval buildup
- Kiyokazu Abo (Japanese: 安保清種) – Admiral in the Imperial Japanese Navy.
- Akashi Motojiro (Japanese: 明石元二郎) – Intelligence officer known for espionage in Russia.
- Akiyama Saneyuki (Japanese: 秋山真之) – Naval strategist during the Russo-Japanese War.
- Akiyama Yoshifuru (Japanese: 秋山好古) – Cavalry general and elder brother of Saneyuki.
- Andō Teibi (Japanese: 安藤利兵衛) – Army general who served in Manchuria.
- Sadao Araki (Japanese: 荒木貞夫) – Army general and influential nationalist figure.
- Arima Ryōkitsu (Japanese: 有馬頼底) – Naval officer and later admiral.
- Prince Arisugawa Takehito (Japanese: 有栖川宮威仁親王) – Imperial prince and naval commander.
- Asada Nobuoki (Japanese: 浅田信興) – General and staff officer in the Imperial Army.
- Dewa Shigetō (Japanese: 出羽重遠) – Vice admiral in the Imperial Japanese Navy.
- Eto Kyōsuke (Japanese: 江藤恭介) – Rear admiral active during the war’s naval campaigns.
- Kōichi Fujii (Japanese: 藤井康一) – Naval officer involved in early engagements.
- Fukushima Yasumasa (Japanese: 福島安正) – Army general and former military attaché in Europe.
- Motoo Furushō (Japanese: 古荘素雄) – High-ranking naval officer and fleet staff.
- Prince Fushimi Hiroyasu (Japanese: 伏見宮博恭王) – Imperial prince and admiral of the fleet.
- Prince Fushimi Sadanaru (Japanese: 伏見宮貞愛親王) – General and envoy during peace negotiations.
- Gwon Jung-hyeon (politician) (Japanese: 郭重賢) – Korean official aligned with Japanese Empire.
- Yoshioka Hansaku (Japanese: 吉岡半作) – Imperial Army officer during the war.
- Haraguchi Kensai (Japanese: 原口賢策) – Rear admiral and early naval reform advocate.
- Kiyoshi Hasegawa (admiral) (Japanese: 長谷川清) – Naval commander and colonial governor.
- Hasegawa Yoshimichi (Japanese: 長谷川好道) – General and commander of Japanese forces in Korea.
- Shunroku Hata (Japanese: 畑俊六) – Young staff officer, later became field marshal.
- Senjūrō Hayashi (Japanese: 林銑十郎) – General and later Prime Minister of Japan.
- Hidaka Sōnojō (Japanese: 日高壮之丞) – Rear admiral in the navy’s early modernization efforts.
- Prince Higashifushimi Yorihito (Japanese: 東伏見宮依仁親王) – Imperial prince and career naval officer.
- Hirose Katsuhiko (Japanese: 広瀬勝比古) – Imperial Navy officer killed in action.
- Takashi Hishikari (Japanese: 菱刈隆) – Infantry commander active in Manchuria.
- Shigeru Honjō (Japanese: 本庄繁) – Field officer who rose to become a general.
- Gengo Hyakutake (Japanese: 百武源吾) – Naval captain known for bravery at sea.
- Ichinohe Hyoe (Japanese: 市来米兵衛) – Army general noted for combat leadership.
- Tadamichi Kamaya (Japanese: 鎌谷忠道) – Army officer in early Manchurian campaigns.
- Kamimura Hikonojō (Japanese: 神無月彦之丞) – Vice admiral who fought at the Battle of Tsushima.
- Yōzō Kaneko (Japanese: 金子陽三) – Navy officer involved in fleet operations.
- Prince Kan'in Kotohito (Japanese: 閑院宮載仁親王) – Aristocratic admiral and naval leader.
- Kataoka Shichirō (Japanese: 片岡七郎) – Admiral commanding cruisers.
- Katō Kanji (Japanese: 加藤寛治) – Army officer in infantry divisions.
- Katō Sadakichi (Japanese: 加藤貞吉) – Naval officer in blockading fleets.
- Katō Tomosaburō (Japanese: 加藤友三郎) – Admiral later served as Prime Minister.
- Bunzaburō Kawagishi (Japanese: 川岸文三郎) – Army staff officer during siege operations.
- Kawamura Kageaki (Japanese: 川村景明) – Field marshal in cavalry units.
- Kigoshi Yasutsuna (Japanese: 起越安綱) – Army engineer and fortifications expert.
- Seizō Kobayashi (Japanese: 小林省三) – Naval officer in torpedo divisions.
- Kodama Gentarō (Japanese: 児玉源太郎) – Army general and later Governor-General of Korea.
- Kuniaki Koiso (Japanese: 小磯國昭) – Lieutenant involved in military logistics.
- Prince Kuni Kuniyoshi (Japanese: 久邇宮邦彦王) – Imperial navy officer and statesman.
- Kuroki Tamemoto (Japanese: 黒木為楨) – General of First Army.
- Kusunose Yukihiko (Japanese: 楠瀬幸彦) – Army colonel in infantry brigades.
- Kutsumi Tsuneo (Japanese: 沓見恒雄) – Naval officer in fleet command.
- Jinzaburō Masaki (Japanese: 正力甚三郎) – Staff officer in War Ministry.
- Iwane Matsui (Japanese: 松井石根) – Army general, later in Taiwan command.
- Matsumoto Kazu (Japanese: 松本和) – Navy officer stationed in colonial waters.
- Matsumura Tatsuo (admiral) (Japanese: 松村辰雄) – Admiral overseeing training squadrons.
- Shizuo Matsuoka (Japanese: 松岡静雄) – Staff officer in army planning.
- Hajime Matsushita (Japanese: 松下肇) – Naval engineer and innovator.
- Jirō Minami (Japanese: 南次郎) – Army officer (later Governor-General of Korea).
- Misu Sōtarō (Japanese: 三須宗太郎) – Navy vice-admiral in intelligence.
- Mori Ōgai (Japanese: 森鴎外) – Army surgeon and renowned novelist.
- Murakami Kakuichi (Japanese: 村上格一) – Navy engineer involved in ship maintenance.
- Nobuyoshi Mutō (Japanese: 武藤信義) – Staff officer in military logistics.
- Osami Nagano (Japanese: 永野修身) – Navy officer who later became Chief of the Imperial Japanese Navy General Staff.
- Nagata Yasujirō (Japanese: 永田保治郎) – Army staff officer noted for logistical planning.
- Kesago Nakajima (Japanese: 中島介三) – Infantry commander in early battles.
- Nakamura Satoru (general) (Japanese: 中村覚) – Cavalry officer in Manchurian campaigns.
- Jirō Nangō (Japanese: 南郷次郎) – Naval lieutenant during sea engagements.
- Takeji Nara (Japanese: 奈良武治) – Cavalry officer at Port Arthur.
- Nashiba Tokioki (Japanese: 梨羽時雄) – Officer in armored train units.
- Prince Nashimoto Morimasa (Japanese: 梨本宮守正王) – Member of imperial family and military official.
- Nishi Kanjirō (Japanese: 西寛治郎) – Staff officer in war operations.
- Toshizō Nishio (Japanese: 西尾利三) – Engineering officer in the army corps.
- Nogi Maresuke (Japanese: 乃木希典) – General famous for commanding the Siege of Port Arthur.
- Kojūrō Nozaki (Japanese: 野崎小十郎) – Navy engineer officer.
- Nozu Michitsura (Japanese: 野津道貫) – Army commander in northern campaigns.
- Ogasawara Naganari (Japanese: 小笠原長成) – Navy officer with colonial ship duty.
- Ogawa Mataji (Japanese: 小川又次) – Army officer in Manchurian front.
- Ogura Byōichirō (Japanese: 小倉兵一郎) – Naval tactician during fleet operations.
- Koshirō Oikawa (Japanese: 及川公麿) – Guard ship commander in coastal defense.
- Oka Ichinosuke (Japanese: 岡一之助) – Cavalry officer in reconnaissance missions.
- Keisuke Okada (Japanese: 岡田啓介) – Navy lieutenant at Tsushima.
- Oku Yasukata (Japanese: 奥保鞏) – Army general in early war planning.
- Ōkubo Haruno (Japanese: 大久保春野) – Infantry commander in strategic offensives.
- Ōsako Naoharu (Japanese: 大迫直方) – Staff officer in railway logistics.
- Ōsako Naomichi (Japanese: 大迫直道) – Hospital corps officer behind the lines.
- Ōshima Hisanao (Japanese: 大島久直) – Navy admiral in late-war shipping control.
- Ōshima Ken'ichi (Japanese: 大島賢一) – Naval engineer during fleet refits.
- Ōshima Yoshimasa (Japanese: 大島義昌) – Cruiser commander in naval battles.
- Mineo Ōsumi (Japanese: 大角岑生) – Navy staff member in war cabinet.
- Otani Kikuzo (Japanese: 大谷喜久蔵) – Army general who oversaw reserves.
- Ōyama Iwao (Japanese: 大山巌) – Commander-in-Chief of Japanese land forces.
- Saburō Hyakutake (Japanese: 百武三郎) – Naval officer in torpedo divisions.
- Saitō Makoto (Japanese: 斎藤實) – Rear admiral and later Governor-General of Korea.
- Ryū Saitō (Japanese: 斉藤竜) – Army officer noted for frontier campaigns.
- Tsutomu Sakuma (Japanese: 佐久間勉) – Submarine officer who died on duty.
- Samejima Kazunori (Japanese: 鮫島一蔵) – Infantry commander on Manchurian front.
- Samejima Shigeo (Japanese: 鮫島重雄) – Staff officer in military intelligence.
- Kōzō Satō (Japanese: 佐藤甲造) – Navy captain in fleet convoy leadership.
- Satō Tetsutarō (Japanese: 佐藤鐵太郎) – Naval strategist and theorist.
- Sentō Takenaka (Japanese: 天野傳田) – Engineer officer in siege operations.
- Shiba Gorō (Japanese: 芝五郎) – Cavalry officer and military instructor.
- Shibayama Yahachi (Japanese: 柴山弥八) – Fleet officer in coastal patrols.
- Shigetarō Shimada (Japanese: 嶋田重太郎) – Naval engineer later Navy Minister.
- Shimamura Hayao (Japanese: 島村速雄) – Vice admiral involved in naval planning.
- Kōichi Shiozawa (Japanese: 塩澤廣一) – Naval officer in early destroyer flotillas.
- Yoshinori Shirakawa (Japanese: 白川義則) – Infantry officer who rose to general.
- Suetsugu Nobumasa (Japanese: 末次信正) – Rear admiral and naval commander.
- Masato Sugi (Japanese: 杉雅人) – Army officer in reconnaissance units.
- Hajime Sugiyama (Japanese: 杉山元) – Junior staff officer during war.
- Kantarō Suzuki (Japanese: 鈴木貫太郎) – Naval midshipman and future Prime Minister.
- Tachibana Koichirō (Japanese: 橘周太郎) – Infantry officer in siege warfare.
- Hayao Tada (Japanese: 多田元) – Staff officer in logistics.
- Takarabe Takeshi (Japanese: 高良武) – Navy engineer on harbor defenses.
- Prince Tsunehisa Takeda (Japanese: 竹田恒久王) – Imperial naval officer and royal family member.
- Heitarō Takenouchi (Japanese: 武内平太郎) – Infantry commander in hill battles.
- Isamu Takeshita (Japanese: 竹下勇) – Navy lieutenant and diplomat.
- Taketomi Kunikane (Japanese: 武富国兼) – Marine engineer in coastal vessels.
- Jirō Tamon (Japanese: 玉熊二郎) – Cavalry officer in reconnaissance missions.
- Tanaka Giichi (Japanese: 田中義一) – Infantry officer and later Prime Minister.
- Hisao Tani (Japanese: 谷久雄) – Staff officer in strategic planning.
- Yoshitsugu Tatekawa (Japanese: 立川義助) – Army officer later military attaché.
- Uchiyama Kojirō (Japanese: 内山小二郎) – Army general who served in the Russo-Japanese War
- Ueda Arisawa (Japanese: 上田有沢) – Army officer in field artillery divisions
- Uehara Yūsaku (Japanese: 植原惟健) – Navy lieutenant in coastal defense units
- Morihei Ueshiba (Japanese: 植芝盛平) – Army officer, later founder of aikido
- Umezawa Michiharu (Japanese: 梅沢道治) – Naval engineer during the war
- Uryū Sotokichi (Japanese: 有田春吉) – Vice admiral engaged in naval operations
- Jōtarō Watanabe (Japanese: 渡辺譲太郎) – Army officer in early campaigns
- Hikohachi Yamada (Japanese: 山田彦八) – Naval officer stationed at Port Arthur
- Isoroku Yamamoto (Japanese: 山本五十六) – Young naval officer, later famed WWII admiral
- Yamanashi Hanzō (Japanese: 山梨半造) – Army staff officer involved in logistics
- Prince Yamashina Kikumaro (Japanese: 山階菊麿王) – Imperial prince and naval officer
- Yamashita Gentarō (Japanese: 山下源太郎) – Navy officer overseeing fleet maintenance
- Yamaya Tanin (Japanese: 山屋斟也) – Vice admiral active in sea battles
- Heisuke Yanagawa (Japanese: 柳川平助) – Army officer in artillery divisions
- Yashiro Rokurō (Japanese: 八代六郎) – Naval engineer and fleet officer
- Sueki Yonemura (Japanese: 米村末紀) – Army officer in communication units
- Yoshida Masujirō (Japanese: 吉田増次郎) – Army infantry officer in Manchuria
- Shigetarō Yoshimatsu (Japanese: 吉松重太郎) – Naval lieutenant in destroyer squadron
- Yui Mitsue (Japanese: 由井光江) – Army officer in engineering corps
- Yun Chi-sung (Japanese: 尹致晟) – Korean cavalry officer attached to Japanese forces

==== Other Japanese figures ====
- Eiji Shigeta (Japanese: 重田榮治) – Japanese war correspondent during the Russo-Japanese War
- Katai Tayama (田山 花袋) – Japanese writer who reported on the war.

=== Russian ===
- Nicholas II (Russian: Николай II) – Emperor of Russia and supreme commander during the Russo-Japanese War
- Aleksey Kuropatkin (Russian: Алексей Куропаткин) – Russian general and Minister of War during the Russo-Japanese War.
- Alexander Troyanovsky (Russian: Александр Трояновский) – Russian military attaché to Japan during the war.

==== Russian political figures ====
- Aleksandr Bezobrazov (businessman) (Russian: Александр Безобразов) – businessman and unofficial political adviser advocating aggressive Far East policy
- Nadezhda Aleksandrovna Bobrinskaya (Russian: Надежда Александровна Бобринская) – Russian noblewoman and war philanthropist
- Alexander Izvolsky (Russian: Александр Извольский) – Russian Foreign Minister during pre-war diplomacy.
- Vladimir Lamsdorf (Russian: Владимир Ламсдорф) – Russian foreign minister during the early war
- Roman Rosen (Russian: Роман Розен) – Russian diplomat and peace negotiator at Portsmouth
- Sergei Witte (Russian: Сергей Витте) – Chief Russian negotiator at Portsmouth, key statesman

==== Russian military figures ====
- Ali Aaltonen
- Alexey Abaza (Russian: Алексе́й Абаза́) – Russian admiral involved in naval operations during the Russo-Japanese War.
- Ilyas bey Aghalarov (Russian: Илья́с бе́й Ага́ларов) – Russian Imperial Army officer who served in the Russo-Japanese War.
- Mikhail Alekseyev (Russian: Михаи́л Але́ксеев) – Russian general who commanded forces at the Battle of Liaoyang.
- Yevgeni Ivanovich Alekseyev (Russian: Евге́ний Ива́нович Але́ксеев) – Viceroy of the Far East and Commander-in-Chief of Russian forces during the war.
- Vasily Altfater (Russian: Васи́лий Альфта́тер) – Russian naval officer active in the conflict.
- Oskar Amberg (Russian: О́скар А́мберг) – Estonian officer in Russian service during the war.
- Nikolay Anisimov (Russian: Никола́й Ани́симов) – Russian officer who participated in the war.
- Christophor Araratov (Russian: Христофо́р Арара́тов) – Armenian general in the Russian army during the conflict.
- Leonid Artamonov (Russian: Леони́д Артамо́нов) – Russian general who led troops in Manchuria.
- Andrejs Auzāns (Russian: Андрей Ауза́нс) – Latvian officer serving in Russian forces.
- Theodor Avellan (Russian: Феодор Авеллан) – Commander of the Baltic Fleet during the war.
- Vladimir Baer (Russian: Влади́мир Ба́эр) – Russian naval officer in the war.
- Yakov Bagratuni (Russian: Я́ков Баграту́ни) – Armenian military officer in the conflict.
- Mikhail Bakhirev (Russian: Михаи́л Бахи́рев) – Admiral noted for naval engagements.
- Andrei Bakich (Russian: Андрей Бакич) – Russian officer involved in the war.
- Nikifor Begichev (Russian: Никифор Бегичев) – Russian naval officer.
- Leon Berbecki (Russian: Леон Бербе́цкий) – Polish officer in Russian service.
- Mikhail Berens (Russian: Михаи́л Бере́нс) – Russian admiral active in naval battles.
- Yevgeny Berens (Russian: Евге́ний Бере́нс) – Russian naval officer, brother of Mikhail.
- Pyotr Bezobrazov (Russian: Пётр Безобра́зов) – Naval officer during the conflict.
- Alexander Alexandrovich von Bilderling (Russian: Александр Александрович фон Бильдерлинг) – Russian general in the war.
- Aleksei Birilev (Russian: Алексе́й Бири́лев) – Russian officer.
- Vasily Boldyrev (Russian: Васи́лий Бо́лдырев) – Russian general.
- Hjalmar von Bonsdorff (Russian: Хьялмар фон Бонсдорф) – Finnish naval officer in Russian service.
- Nikolai Aleksandrovich Brzozovsky (Russian: Никола́й Александрович Бржозо́вский) – Russian officer.
- Nikolai Bukhvostov (Russian: Никола́й Бухво́стов) – Russian naval officer.
- Semyon Budyonny (Russian: Семён Будённый) – Cavalry officer in the war.
- Georgy Bulatsel (Russian: Гео́ргий Булаце́ль) – Russian officer.
- Nikolay Burdenko (Russian: Николай Бурденко) – Russian military surgeon who provided medical services during the war.
- Hugo Celmiņš (Russian: Гуго Целминьш) – Latvian officer in the Imperial Russian Army during the Russo-Japanese War.
- Alexey Cherepennikov (Russian: Алексей Черепенников) – Russian general who participated in the war.
- Pavel Vasilievich Chudinov (Russian: Павел Васильевич Чудинов) – Russian military officer involved in the conflict.
- Grigoriy Pavlovich Chukhnin (Russian: Григорий Павлович Чухнин) – Russian admiral, served during the war.
- Vasile Cijevschi (Russian: Василий Чижевский) – Officer in the Russian Imperial Army during the Russo-Japanese War.
- Toma Ciorbă (Russian: Тома Чёрбэ) – Military figure of the era with participation in Russian imperial forces.
- Leonid Dembowsky (Russian: Леонид Дембовский) – Russian general active in the war.
- Anton Denikin (Russian: Антон Деникин) – Served as a staff officer in the Russo-Japanese War.
- Mikhail Diterikhs (Russian: Михаил Дитерихс) – Russian general who took part in battles of the conflict.
- Dimitar Dobrev (officer) (Russian: Димитар Добрев) – Officer in Russian service during the war.
- Matei Donici (Russian: Матей Донич) – Military figure associated with Russian imperial forces.
- Józef Dowbor-Muśnicki (Russian: Юзеф Довбор-Мусницкий) – Polish officer serving in the Imperial Russian Army during the war.
- Mikhail Drozdovsky (Russian: Михаил Дроздовский) – Russian officer known for service in the Russo-Japanese War.
- Alexander Alexandrovich Dushkevich (Russian: Александр Александрович Душкевич) – Russian general who participated in the war.
- Evgeny Egoriev (Russian: Евгений Егоров) – Russian naval officer involved in the conflict.
- Boris Alexandrovich Engelhardt (Russian: Борис Александрович Энгельгардт) – Military officer in the Imperial Russian Army during the war.
- Oskar Enqvist (Russian: Оскар Энквист) – Admiral in the Russian Navy during the war.
- Nikolai Ottovich von Essen (Russian: Николай Оттович фон Эссен) – Russian admiral active in naval battles of the war.
- Hans William von Fersen (Russian: Ганс Вильгельм фон Ферзен) – Russian naval officer during the conflict.
- Vasily Flug (Russian: Василий Флуг) – Officer in the Imperial Russian forces.
- Alexander Fok (Russian: Александр Фок) – Russian general and commander during the Russo-Japanese War.
- Dmitry Gustavovich von Fölkersahm (Russian: Дмитрий Густавович фон Фёлькерзам) – Russian naval officer.
- Jānis Francis (Russian: Янис Францис) – Latvian officer in the Russian army during the war.
- Vasily Gavrilov (Russian: Василий Гаврилов) – Russian general active in the conflict.
- Aleksandr Gerngross (Russian: Александр Гернгросс) – Russian general who commanded forces during the war.
- Sergei Konstantinovich Gershelman (Russian: Сергей Константинович Гершельман) – Russian general involved in the Russo-Japanese War.
- Ippolit Giliarovsky (Russian: Ипполит Гиляровский) – Russian naval officer present at the Battle of Tsushima.
- Leonid Gobyato (Russian: Леонид Гобято) – Artillery general and innovator who served in the war.
- Vladimir Gorbatovsky (Russian: Владимир Горбатовский) – Russian general during the conflict.
- Georgy Semyonovich Gotua (Russian: Георгий Семёнович Готуа) – Military figure in the Russo-Japanese War.
- Ivan Grigorovich (Russian: Иван Григорович) – Last Imperial Russian Navy Minister and admiral during the war.
- Oskar Gripenberg (Russian: Оскар Грипенберг) – Russian general and commander at the Battle of Mukden.
- Vasily Gurko (Russian: Василий Гурко) – Cavalry general who played key roles in the war.
- Hovhannes Hakhverdyan (Russian: Ованнес Аквердян) – Armenian general in the Russian army during the conflict.
- Aleksander Hint (Russian: Александр Хинт) – Officer serving in the Russian Imperial Army.
- Carl von Hoffman (Russian: Карл фон Хоффман) – Military officer during the war.
- Nykyfor Hryhoriv (Russian: Никифор Григорьев) – Russian officer active in the war.
- Vasily Ignatius (Russian: Василий Игнатий) – Russian general during the Russo-Japanese War.
- Yevgeni Iskritsky (Russian: Евгений Искрицкий) – Artillery general in Russian forces.
- Nikolai Istomin (Russian: Николай Истомин) – Naval officer in the Imperial Russian Navy.
- Nikolai Ivanov (general) (Russian: Николай Иванов) – Russian general active in the Russo-Japanese War.
- Wacław Iwaszkiewicz-Rudoszański (Russian: Вацлав Ивашкевич-Рудозанский) – Polish officer serving in the Russian army during the war.
- Władysław Jędrzejewski (Russian: Владислав Енджеевский) – Polish officer serving in the Russian Imperial Army during the war.
- Karl Jessen (Russian: Карл Йессен) – Russian admiral active in naval operations during the Russo-Japanese War.
- Eduards Kalniņš (Russian: Эдуард Калныньш) – Latvian officer in the Russian army during the conflict.
- Kipryian Kandratovich (Russian: Киприан Кондратович) – Russian general who fought in the war.
- Vladimir Kantakuzen (Russian: Владимир Кантакузен) – Russian military officer during the conflict.
- Mykola Kapustiansky (Russian: Николай Капустянский) – Ukrainian officer in the Russian army during the war.
- Dmitry Karbyshev (Russian: Дмитрий Карбышев) – Russian general and engineer, served in the war.
- Nikolai Kashtalinsky (Russian: Николай Кашталинский) – Russian general in the conflict.
- Maksimas Katche (Russian: Максимас Каче) – Lithuanian officer in Russian service.
- Alexander von Kaulbars (Russian: Александр фон Каульбарс) – Russian general and cavalry commander.
- Ivane Kazbegi (Russian: Иван Казбеги) – Georgian officer in the Russian army.
- Fyodor Eduardovich Keller (Russian: Фёдор Эдуардович Келлер) – Russian general involved in the war.
- Mikhail Kedrov (admiral) (Russian: Михаил Кедров) – Russian naval officer.
- Grand Duke Kirill Vladimirovich of Russia (Russian: Великий князь Кирилл Владимирович) – Russian Imperial family member and naval officer.
- Vladimir Kislitsin (Russian: Владимир Кислицин) – Russian officer.
- Pyotr Pavlovich Kitkin (Russian: Пётр Павлович Киткин) – Russian naval officer.
- Konstantinas Kleščinskis (Russian: Константинас Клещинскис) – Lithuanian officer in the Russian army.
- Alexander Kolchak (Russian: Александр Колчак) – Russian naval commander and later leader in the Civil War.
- Nikolai Kolomeitsev (Russian: Николай Коломейцев) – Russian naval officer.
- Roman Kondratenko (Russian: Роман Кондратенко) – Russian general who led the defense of Port Arthur.
- Hasan Konopacki (Russian: Гасан Конопацкий) – Russian officer who served in the conflict.
- Lavr Kornilov (Russian: Лавр Корнилов) – Russian general who fought in the war and later in the Civil War.
- Vladimir Kossogovsky (Russian: Владимир Коссоговский) – Russian naval officer.
- Fyodor Kostyayev (Russian: Фёдор Костяев) – Russian military officer.
- Juozas Kraucevičius (Russian: Йозас Крауцявичюс) – Lithuanian officer in Russian service.
- Leonid Kulik (Russian: Леонид Кулик) – Russian geologist and military officer.
- Alexander Kutepov (Russian: Александр Кутепов) – Russian military officer.
- Giorgi Kvinitadze (Russian: Георгий Квинитадзе) – Georgian officer in Russian service.
- Max Kyuss (Russian: Макс Кюсс) – Russian military officer.
- Andres Larka (Russian: Андрес Ларка) – Estonian officer in Russian army.
- Dmitri Lebedev (general) (Russian: Дмитрий Лебедев) – Russian general.
- Ivan Lebedev (Russian: Иван Лебедев) – Russian naval officer.
- Platon Lechitsky (Russian: Платон Лещицкий) – Russian general during the war.
- Hans Leesment (Russian: Ганс Лейсмент) – Estonian officer in the Russian army.
- Leonid Lesh (Russian: Леонид Лещ) – Russian general.
- Nikolay Leontiev (Russian: Николай Леонтьев) – Russian general and explorer.
- Pavel Levitsky (Russian: Павел Левицкий) – Russian naval officer.
- Alexander Karl Nikolai von Lieven (Russian: Александр Карл Николаевич Ливен) – Russian naval officer.
- Paul Lill (Russian: Пауль Лилл) – Estonian officer in the Russian army.
- Nikolai Linevich (Russian: Николай Линевич) – Russian general and commander-in-chief in the war.
- Nikolai Lishin (Russian: Николай Лишин) – Russian admiral.
- Antoni Listowski (Russian: Антоний Листовский) – Polish officer in the Russian army.
- Pyotr Lomnovsky (Russian: Пётр Ломновский) – Russian general.
- Mikhail Nikolaevich Lyapunov (Russian: Михаил Николаевич Ляпунов) – Russian general.
- Stepan Makarov (Russian: Степан Макаров) – Renowned Russian admiral and oceanographer.
- Mieczysław Mackiewicz (Russian: Мечислав Макиевич) – Polish officer serving in the Russian Imperial Army.
- Savelii Makhno (Russian: Савелий Махно) – Officer in the Russian forces.
- Carl Gustaf Emil Mannerheim (Russian: Карл Густав Эмиль Маннергейм) – Finnish officer in the Russian Imperial Army.
- Sergey Markov (Russian: Сергей Марков) – Russian general.
- Georgy Matsievsky (Russian: Георгий Мацьевский) – Russian officer.
- Vladimir May-Mayevsky (Russian: Владимир Май-Маевский) – Russian general.
- Yevgeny Maximov (Russian: Евгений Максимов) – Russian officer.
- Giorgi Mazniashvili (Russian: Георгий Мазниашвили) – Georgian officer in the Russian army.
- Samad bey Mehmandarov (Russian: Самед-бек Мехмандаров) – Azerbaijani general in Russian service.
- Feofil Egorovich Meyendorf (Russian: Феофил Егорович Мейендорф) – Russian general and diplomat.
- Vladimir Miklukha (Russian: Владимир Миклуха) – Russian naval officer.
- Pavel Mishchenko (Russian: Павел Мищенко) – Russian general.
- Bolesław Mościcki (Russian: Болеслав Мосцицкий) – Polish officer serving in the Russian army.
- Iosif Mrozovsky (Russian: Иосиф Мрозовский) – Russian general.
- Louis Napoléon Achille Charles Murat (Russian: Луи Наполеон Акилль Шарль Мюра) – Russian general of French descent.
- Mikhail Artemyevich Muravyov (Russian: Михаил Артемьевич Муравьёв) – Russian general and statesman.
- Dmitry Nadyozhny (Russian: Дмитрий Надёжный) – Russian general during the Russo-Japanese War.
- Huseyn Khan Nakhchivanski (Russian: Гусейн-хан Нахичеванский) – Cavalry general in the Russian Imperial Army.
- Nicolay Natzvalov (Russian: Николай Нацвалов) – Russian officer who served during the conflict.
- Tovmas Nazarbekian (Russian: Товмас Назарбекян) – Armenian general who fought in the war.
- Nikolai Nebogatov (Russian: Николай Небогатов) – Russian admiral who commanded naval forces during the war.
- Arkady Nebolsin (Russian: Аркадий Небольсин) – Russian naval officer.
- Adrian Nepenin (Russian: Адриан Непенин) – Russian admiral active in the war.
- Arkady Nishchenkov (Russian: Аркадий Нищенков) – Russian naval officer.
- Vladimir Nikolayevich Nikitin (Russian: Владимир Никитин) – Russian officer.
- Nikon of Karoulia (Russian: Никон Карульский) – Russian Orthodox monk; not military, no direct involvement.
- Aleksey Novikov-Priboy (Russian: Алексей Новиков-Прибой) – Russian naval officer and writer, participated in the war.
- Vasily Fedorovich Novitsky (Russian: Василий Новицкий) – Russian general.
- Pyotr Oganovsky (Russian: Пётр Огановский) – Russian general during the conflict.
- Vladimir Olderogge (Russian: Владимир Олдерогге) – Russian general.
- Mykhailo Omelianovych-Pavlenko (Russian: Михаил Омелянович-Павленко) – Ukrainian officer in the Russian army.
- Georgy Orbeliani (Russian: Георгий Орбелиани) – Georgian officer.
- Manuil Ozerov (Russian: Мануил Озеров) – Russian naval officer.
- Mārtiņš Peniķis (Russian: Мартиньш Пеникис) – Latvian officer in Russian service.
- Adolph Pfingsten (Russian: Адольф Пфингстен) – Russian general.
- Ernst Põdder (Russian: Эрнст Пёддер) – Estonian officer in the Russian army.
- Georgy Polkovnikov (Russian: Георгий Полковников) – Russian general.
- Peter Polovtsov (Russian: Пётр Половцов) – Russian general.
- Vladimir Popov (admiral) (Russian: Владимир Попов) – Russian admiral.
- Kazimierz Porębski (Russian: Казимир Порембский) – Polish officer in Russian service.
- Pavel Pototsky (general) (Russian: Павел Потоцкий) – Russian general.
- Mikhail Promtov (Russian: Михаил Промтов) – Russian general.
- Amanullah Mirza Qajar (Russian: Аманулла Мирза Каджар) – Iranian prince and Russian officer.
- Feyzullah Mirza Qajar (Russian: Фейзулла Мирза Каджар) – Iranian prince and Russian officer.
- Evgeny Radkevich (Russian: Евгений Радкевич) – Russian general.
- Nikolay Rattel (Russian: Николай Ратель) – Russian general.
- Aleksandr Vladimirovich Razvozov (Russian: Александр Развозов) – Russian admiral.
- Nikolai Reitsenshtein (Russian: Николай Рейзенштейн) – Russian admiral.
- Paul von Rennenkampf (Russian: Павел Ренненкампф) – Russian general and commander during the war.
- Ivan Romanovsky (Russian: Иван Романовский) – Russian officer.
- Anatoly Rosenshield (Russian: Анатолий Розеншильд) – Russian general.
- Sergey Rozanov (1869) (Russian: Сергей Розанов) – Russian general.
- Zinovy Rozhestvensky (Russian: Зиновий Рожественский) – Russian admiral who commanded the Baltic Fleet.
- Vsevolod Rudnev (Russian: Всеволод Руднев) – Russian naval officer.
- Mikhail Sablin (Russian: Михаил Саблин) – Russian admiral.
- Nikolai Pavlovich Sablin (Russian: Николай Саблин) – Russian naval officer.
- Viktor Sakharov (Russian: Виктор Сахаров) – Russian general.
- Vladimir Sakharov (general) (Russian: Владимир Сахаров) – Russian general.
- Alexander Samsonov (Russian: Александр Самсонов) – Russian general.
- Alexey Schastny (Russian: Алексей Шастный) – Russian admiral.
- Eduard Schensnovich (Russian: Эдуард Шенснович) – Russian admiral.
- Yakov Schkinsky (Russian: Яков Шкинский) – Russian officer.
- Mikhail Fedorovich von Schultz (Russian: Михаил Фёдорович фон Шульц) – Russian naval officer.
- Konstantin Fedorovich von Schultz (Russian: Константин Фёдорович фон Шульц) – Russian naval officer.
- Georgy Sedov (Russian: Георгий Седов) – Russian naval officer and explorer.
- Andrey Selivanov (Russian: Андрей Селиванов) – Russian general.
- Sergei Sergeyev-Tsensky (Russian: Сергей Сергеев-Ценский) – Russian writer and officer.
- Ilya Shatrov (Russian: Илья Шатров) – Russian officer.
- Aliagha Shikhlinski (Russian: Алиага Шихлинский) – Azerbaijani artillery general in Russian service.
- Sergey I. Shivtzov (Russian: Сергей Шивцов) – Russian officer.
- Boris Shteifon (Russian: Борис Штейфон) – Russian general.
- Jan Sierada (Russian: Ян Серяда) – Belarusian officer.
- Dāvids Sīmansons (Russian: Давид Симанс) – Latvian officer.
- Pavlo Skoropadskyi (Russian: Павел Скоропадский) – Ukrainian officer.
- Nikolai Skrydlov (Russian: Николай Скрыльцов) – Russian admiral.
- Arkady Skugarevsky (Russian: Аркадий Скугаревский) – Russian general.
- Vladas Dionizas Slaboševičius (Russian: Владас Слабошевчис) – Lithuanian officer.
- Konstantin Smirnov (Russian: Константин Смирнов) – Russian general.
- Mikhail Smirnov (admiral) (Russian: Михаил Смирнов) – Russian admiral.
- Mikhail Sokovin (Russian: Михаил Соковин) – Russian general.
- Jaan Soots (Russian: Яан Соотс) – Estonian officer.
- Viktor Spiridonov (Russian: Виктор Спиридонов) – Russian admiral.
- Georg von Stackelberg (Russian: Георг фон Штакельберг) – Baltic German officer.
- Oskar Starck (Russian: Оскар Старк) – Russian admiral.
- Anatoly Stessel (Russian: Анатолий Стессель) – Russian general.
- Alexander Svechin (Russian: Александр Свечин) – Russian military theorist and general.
- Mikhail Svechnikov (Russian: Михаил Свечников) – Russian general.
- Sylvester Stankievich (Russian: Сильвестр Станкевич) – Russian general.
- Pavel Sytin (Russian: Павел Сытин) – Russian general.
- Abdul-bey Tabasaransky (Russian: Абдул-бей Табасаранский) – Officer in the Imperial Russian Army during the Russo-Japanese War.
- Alexander von Taube (Russian: Александр фон Таубе) – Russian general who served in the conflict.
- Pyotr Telezhnikov (Russian: Пётр Тележников) – Russian military officer during the war.
- Aleksander Tõnisson (Russian: Александр Тынниссон) – Estonian officer in Russian service.
- Nikolai Tretyakov (Russian: Николай Третьяков) – Russian general active in the war.
- Vyacheslav Troyanov (Russian: Вячеслав Троянов) – Russian military officer.
- Joseph Trumpeldor (Russian: Йозеф Трумпельдор) – Jewish officer in the Russian army.
- Konstantin Tserpitsky (Russian: Константин Церпицкий) – Russian general.
- Pavel Petrovich Ukhtomsky (Russian: Павел Петрович Ухтомский) – Russian naval commander during the war.
- Johan Unt (Russian: Йохан Унт) – Estonian officer in the Russian army.
- Ibrahim bey Usubov (Russian: Ибрагим-бей Усубов) – Azerbaijani officer in Russian service.
- Gleb Vannovsky (Russian: Глеб Ванновский) – Russian military officer.
- Dmitry Verderevsky (Russian: Дмитрий Вердеревский) – Russian admiral during the conflict.
- Vikenty Veresaev (Russian: Викентий Вересаев) – Russian military doctor and writer.
- Vasily Vereshchagin (Russian: Василий Верещагин) – Russian war artist and soldier.
- Aleksandr Verkhovsky (Russian: Александр Верховский) – Russian general.
- Grigory Verzhbitsky (Russian: Григорий Вержбицкий) – Russian officer.
- Bruno von Vietinghoff (Russian: Бруно фон Витинггоф) – Russian admiral.
- Wilgelm Vitgeft (Russian: Вильгельм Витгефт) – Russian admiral, commander at the Battle of Tsushima.
- Georgy Viranovsky (Russian: Георгий Вирановский) – Russian officer.
- Robert Viren (Russian: Роберт Вирен) – Russian admiral.
- Nikolai Volodchenko (Russian: Николай Володченко) – Russian general.
- Władysław Wejtko (Russian: Владислав Вейткo) – Polish officer in Russian service.
- Pyotr Wrangel (Russian: Пётр Врангель) – Russian general.
- Nikolai Yudenich (Russian: Николай Юденич) – Russian general and commander.
- Nikolai Zarubaev (Russian: Николай Зарубаев) – Russian general.
- Mikhail Zasulich (Russian: Михаил Засулич) – Russian general.
- Andrei Zayonchkovski (Russian: Андрей Зайончковский) – Russian general.
- Gustavs Zemgals (Russian: Густавс Земгалс) – Latvian officer in the Russian army.
- Yakov Zhilinsky (Russian: Яков Жилинский) – Russian general.
- Eugene Znosko-Borovsky (Russian: Евгений Зноско-Боровский) – Russian officer and chess player.
- Nikolay Nikolaevich Zubov (Russian: Николай Николаевич Зубов) – Russian naval officer.
- Silvestras Žukauskas (Russian: Сильвестрас Жукаускас) – Lithuanian officer.
- Viktor Zykov (Russian: Виктор Зыков) – Russian military officer.

==== Other Russian figures ====
- Vladimir Arsenyev (Russian: Владимир Арсеньев) – Russian explorer and military officer involved in Far Eastern affairs
- Haritina Korotkevich (Russian: Харитина Короткевич) – Russian nurse who served during the war.
- Alexander Troyanovsky (Russian: Александр Трояновский) – Russian military attaché to Japan during the war.

=== Other ===
- Jacob Schiff – American financier who helped fund Japan’s war efforts.

==== Military Observers and Attachés ====
- William Augustus Adam – British Army officer who served as a military attaché observing the Russo-Japanese War.
- Pak Chungyang – Korean military leader during the late Joseon dynasty, indirectly affected by the Russo-Japanese conflict over Korea.
- Thomas Henry Barry – U.S. Army general who observed the Russo-Japanese War to study tactics and technology.
- Ernesto Burzagli – Italian admiral who observed the Russo-Japanese War as a naval attaché.
- Enrico Caviglia – Italian general who served as a military observer with Japanese forces.
- Gunther von Etzel (Russian: Гюнтер фон Эцель) – German officer and military observer during the war, served with Russian forces.
- Granville Roland Fortescue – U.S. Army officer and war correspondent covering the conflict.
- Ian Hamilton (British Army officer) – British military observer in the war.
- Josef Hammar – Swedish military observer during the Russo-Japanese War.
- Max Hoffmann – German officer attached as a military observer during the war.
- Herbert Holman – British officer and military attaché during the war.
- Edward Hutton (British Army officer) – British military observer.
- Jack London – American journalist and writer who reported on the Russo-Japanese War.
- Newton A. McCully – U.S. Navy officer, observer of the naval war.
- Anita Newcomb McGee – American nurse who helped organize medical aid during the war.
- Charles Norris-Newman – British journalist and war correspondent in the Russo-Japanese War.
- John J. Pershing – U.S. Army officer and military observer.

==== Journalists and Writers ====
- Ellis Ashmead-Bartlett – British war correspondent who covered the Russo-Japanese War.
- Maurice Baring – British war correspondent and writer covering the conflict.
- Luigi Barzini Sr. – Italian journalist and war correspondent during the Russo-Japanese War.
- Stephen Bonsal – American journalist and war correspondent.
- William H. Brill – American correspondent covering the war.
- Francis Brinkley – Anglo-Irish journalist who reported from Japan during the war.
- Richard Harding Davis – American war correspondent covering the conflict.
- William Dinwiddie – American journalist and war correspondent during the Russo-Japanese War.
- William Henry Donald – Australian journalist who served as correspondent during the war.
- John Fox Jr. – American writer and war correspondent.
- George Kennan (explorer) – American explorer and journalist; reported on Russo-Japanese War impacts.
- Edward Frederick Knight – British war correspondent and author.
- Eugen Binder von Krieglstein – Austrian journalist and war correspondent.
- Jack London – American writer and war correspondent covering the Russo-Japanese War.
- William Maxwell (journalist) – British war correspondent.
- Francis McCullagh – Irish journalist who reported extensively on the war.
- Thomas Franklin Fairfax Millard – American journalist and political commentator covering East Asia.
- Frederick Ferdinand Moore – American writer and war correspondent.
- George Ernest Morrison – Australian journalist known as “Morrison of Peking,” covered the Russo-Japanese War.
- Vasily Nemirovich-Danchenko (Russian: Василий Немирович-Данченко) – Russian writer and war correspondent during the conflict.
- Benjamin Wegner Nørregaard – Norwegian engineer and journalist who covered the Russo-Japanese War.
- Kido Okamoto (木戸 岡本) – Japanese writer and correspondent.
- Frederick Palmer (journalist) – American war correspondent who covered the conflict.
- Melton Prior – British war artist and correspondent.
- Charles à Court Repington – British military correspondent.
- James Ricalton – American war correspondent and photographer.
- Willard Dickerman Straight – American diplomat and correspondent covering the war.
- Katai Tayama (田山 花袋) – Japanese writer who reported on the war.
- Charles Victor-Thomas – French war correspondent.
- Frederic Villiers – British war artist and correspondent.
- Grant Wallace – American war correspondent and author.

==== Medical ====
- Louis Livingston Seaman – American military surgeon who witnessed the war.
- Kateryna Desnytska – Ukrainian nurse who served in the Russian Imperial Army during the conflict.

== See also ==
- Category:Russo-Japanese War
- Index of articles related to the Russian Revolution and Civil War
- Outline of the Russian Revolutions of 1905 and 1917 and Civil War
