= Timeline of the Russo-Japanese War =

Russo-Japanese War
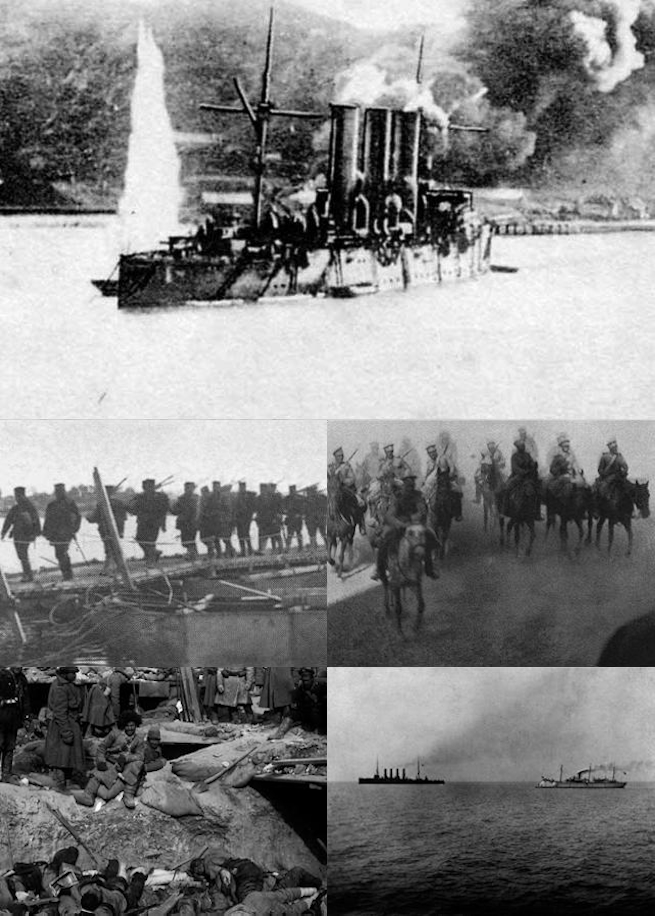
- Clockwise from top: Russian cruiser Pallada under fire at Port Arthur, Russian cavalry at Mukden, Russian cruiser Varyag and gunboat Korietz at Chemulpo Bay, Japanese dead at Port Arthur, Japanese infantry crossing the Yalu River
Date	8 February 1904 – 5 September 1905 (1 year, 6 months and 4 weeks)
Location	Manchuria, Yellow Sea, Korea, Sea of Japan
Result	Japanese victory
Territorial changes	Russia cedes Port Arthur and Dalniy in the Liaodong peninsula, Southern Sakhalin, and the control of the South Manchuria Railway to Japan; Kvantunskaya Oblast and Southern Sakhalin become Kwantung Leased Territory and Karafuto Prefecture respectively

Belligerents
Russia	Japan

Commanders and leaders
Nicholas II; Aleksey Kuropatkin; Roman Kondratenko †; Anatoly Stessel (surrendered); Oskar Gripenberg; Mikhail Zasulich; Yevgeni Alekseyev; Stepan Makarov †; Wilgelm Vitgeft †; Robert Viren; Zinovy Rozhestvensky	Emperor Meiji; Katsura Tarō; Ōyama Iwao; Kodama Gentarō; Nogi Maresuke; Kuroki Tamemoto; Oku Yasukata; Terauchi Masatake; Tōgō Heihachirō; Itō Sukeyuki; Kamimura Hikonojō

Strength
1,365,000 (total): 900,000 (peak)	1,200,000 (total): 650,000 (peak)

Casualties and losses
Total: 43,300–71,453 dead: 34,000–52,623 killed or died of wounds; 9,300–18,830 died of disease; 146,032 wounded; 74,369 captured; Material losses: 8 battleships sunk; 2 battleships captured	Total: 80,378–99,000 dead: 47,152–47,400 killed; 11,424–11,500 died of wounds; 21,802–27,200 died of disease; 153,673–173,400 wounded; Material losses: 2 battleships sunk

This is a chronological timeline of the Russo-Japanese War; covers the period from the outbreak of the war in February 1904 to the signing of the Treaty of Portsmouth in September 1905. The timeline includes major battles, naval engagements, and significant events that shaped the course of the conflict. (Note: Dates are given in the New Style (Gregorian) calendar. Russia used the Old Style (Julian) calendar until 1918, but all dates here follow the internationally standard Gregorian system unless otherwise specified.)

== Overview ==
The Russo-Japanese War (Note: Russian: Русско-японская война, romanized: Russko-yaponskaya voyna; Japanese: 日露戦争, romanized: Nichi-ro sensō); (8 February 1904 – 5 September 1905) was fought between the Russian Empire and the Empire of Japan over rival imperial ambitions in Manchuria and the Korean Empire. The major land battles of the war were fought on the Liaodong Peninsula and near Mukden in Southern Manchuria, with naval battles taking place in the Yellow Sea and the Sea of Japan.

== Timeline of non-military events ==
- 30 January 1902: Anglo-Japanese Alliance signed – sets diplomatic groundwork for Japanese confidence in confronting Russia.
- 6 February 1904: Japan severs diplomatic relations with Russia.
- 10 February 1904: Japan declares war on Russia.
- 11 February 1904: Russia declares war on Japan – formal response following Japanese declaration.
- April–May 1904: Japan assumes control of Korea’s military administration.
- 21–22 October 1904: Dogger Bank incident nearly provokes war between Britain and Russia.
- Late 1904: Growing unrest in Russia with strikes and revolutionary agitation.
- Early 1905: Japanese financial and logistical strain begins to influence push for peace
- January 1905: Bloody Sunday massacre triggers the 1905 Russian Revolution.
- February 1905: Peace overtures quietly begin among neutral powers.
- March–April 1905: U.S. President Theodore Roosevelt begins informal mediation between Russia and Japan.
- June 1905: Mutiny aboard the Russian battleship Potemkin.
- August 1905: Treaty of Portsmouth negotiations begin in the United States.
- September 1905: Hibiya incendiary incident – riots in Tokyo over dissatisfaction with the Treaty of Portsmouth.
- 5 September 1905: Treaty of Portsmouth formally ends the war.
- October 1905: October Manifesto issued in response to revolutionary pressure.
- 1905: Union of the Russian People formed – reactionary movement opposing revolutionary unrest.
- 1906: Theodore Roosevelt awarded the Nobel Peace Prize for mediating the treaty.

== Timeline of military engagements ==
- 8–9 February 1904: Battle of Port Arthur – Initial naval clash marking the outbreak of the war
- 9 February 1904: Battle of Chemulpo Bay – Japanese naval victory off the Korean coast
- 30 April – 1 May 1904: Battle of the Yalu River (1904) – First major land battle, marking Japanese offensive into Manchuria
- 14–15 June 1904: Battle of Te-li-Ssu – Early Japanese success driving Russian forces from the field
- 15 June 1904: Hitachi Maru Incident – Russian interception and sinking of Japanese troop transports
- May 1904: Raid on Yingkou – Japanese naval raid targeting Russian logistics
- 25 May 1904: Battle of Nanshan – Bloody assault securing Japanese advance toward Port Arthur
- 10 July 1904: Battle of Hsimucheng – Japanese victory over Russian forces in eastern Manchuria
- 10 July 1904: Battle of Motien Pass – Early clash securing Japanese control of a strategic mountain pass
- 24–25 July 1904: Battle of Tashihchiao – Japanese tactical victory in southern Manchuria
- 10 August 1904: Battle of the Yellow Sea – Major fleet engagement during breakout attempt from Port Arthur
- 24 August – 4 September 1904: Battle of Liaoyang – One of the largest land battles of the war
- 5–17 October 1904: Battle of Shaho – Costly engagement with no clear victor
- 21–22 October 1904: Dogger Bank incident – Mistaken Russian attack on British fishing vessels en route to Asia
- 25–29 January 1905: Battle of Sandepu – Inconclusive winter battle in Manchuria
- 20 February – 10 March 1905: Battle of Mukden – Massive battle and turning point ending in Russian retreat
- 30 July 1904 – 2 January 1905: Siege of Port Arthur – Prolonged siege of Russia’s key naval stronghold
- 14 August 1904: Battle off Ulsan – Clash between Russian Vladivostok squadron and Japanese cruisers
- 20 August 1904: Battle of Korsakov – Naval skirmish near Sakhalin
- 27–28 May 1905: Battle of Tsushima – Decisive naval engagement ending Russian naval presence in East Asia
- 27–28 May 1905: Battle of Tsushima order of battle – Listing of ships and formations in the decisive battle
- 7–31 July 1905: Japanese invasion of Sakhalin – Final campaign capturing Russian island territory

== See also ==
- Russo-Japanese War
- Outline of the Russo-Japanese War
- List of battles of the Russo-Japanese War
