= Defenders of Port Arthur Medal =

The Defenders of Port Arthur Medal was an unofficial commemorative medal of France, issued privately to reward Russian officers and soldiers who had fought in the defence of Port Arthur.

== History ==
Funds were raised for it by Henri Simon, publisher of the L'Écho de Paris newspaper, who raised around 100,000 Francs. This paid for gifts to reward Anatoly Stessel, the Russian commander at Port Arthur, and for the medals' manufacture and delivery. However, whilst the charity was organising for the medals to be collected, delivered and stamped in Russia, Stessel was put on trial for his surrender of Port Arthur. This substantially affected the course of the medal's history - it was not a Russian state award to the defenders of Port Arthur, although a silver issue of a later Russo-Japanese War Medal was struck for them. Later, on the tenth anniversary of the siege, the Port Arthur Cross was established.

== Eligibility and wearing ==
Gilded silver medals were issued to officers, silver to non commissioned officers and bronze for ordinary sailors, soldiers, nurses, port workers and others involved in the defence. Direct heirs of those killed in the siege could also apply for a medal.

After Stessel's trial, the medals were kept in storage for a long while at Russia's Naval Ministry. It was eventually decided to distribute them, on the condition that a medal holder could only wear it if he or she personally paid for Stessel's name to be removed from it. Most recipients declined to do this and so from 1 December 1910 they were issued but with no right to wear them.

== Sources ==
- https://web.archive.org/web/20160303210158/http://www.phaleristique.com/russie_imperiale/saint_georges/honneur/port-arthur.htm
