= Bibliography of the Russo-Japanese War =

This is a select bibliography of post World War II English language books (including translations) and journal articles about the Russo-Japanese War, the period leading up to the war, and the immediate aftermath. It specifically excludes topics related to the Russian Revolution; see Bibliography of the Russian Revolution and Civil War for information on these subjects.

Works listed here are cited in the notes or bibliographies of scholarly sources. Each is published by an academic or major press, written by a recognized expert, or substantially reviewed in scholarly journals; borderline cases are omitted. A selection of primary sources are included. Many of the books below carry their own bibliographies; see the Further reading section for other bibliographies, and the External links section for historical sites, academic sites, and museums.

Citations follow APA style. (Note: Entries are in plain text APA 7 format without templates; templates are used only for reviews and notes.) Book have citations to academic journal or mainstream published reviews when available. For books only partly about the subject, relevant chapter or section titles are provided when useful and available. Translators of the original-language edition are included when possible. In cases where a title or name has appeared with more than one English spelling, the most recent published form is used and a footnote documents any earlier title under which the work appeared.

== General works ==
- Hall, R. C. (2004). The next war: The influence of the Russo-Japanese War on southeastern Europe and the Balkan wars of 1912–1913. Journal of Slavic Military Studies, 17(3), 563–577.
- Hanninen, O. (2022). Fear and loathing in the Far East: Bandits, law, and the Russo-Japanese War. Kritika: Explorations in Russian and Eurasian History, 23(2), 225–253.
- Katō, Y. (2007). What caused the Russo-Japanese War: Korea or Manchuria?. Social Science Japan Journal, 10(1), 95–103.
- Kowner, R. (2010). The impact of the Russo-Japanese War. Routledge.
- Lensen, G. (1962). Japan and tsarist Russia: The changing relationships, 1875–1917. Jahrbücher für Geschichte Osteuropas, 10(3), Neue Folge, 337–348.
- Masafumi, A. (2010). The China-Russia-Japan military balance in Manchuria, 1906–1918. Modern Asian Studies, 44(6), 1283–1311.
- Matsui, M. (1972). The Russo-Japanese agreement of 1907: Its causes and the progress of negotiations. Modern Asian Studies, 6(1), 33–48.
- Murray, N. (2013). The Russo-Japanese War. In The rocky road to the Great War: The evolution of trench warfare to 1914 (Chap. 4). Potomac Books.
- Nish, I. (1985). The origins of the Russo-Japanese War. Longman.
- Steinberg, J. (2008). Was the Russo-Japanese War World War Zero?. The Russian Review, 67(1), 1–7.
- Tomion, J. W. (1974). Strategy and diplomacy of the Russo-Japanese War reconsidered. Naval War College.
- Van Dijk, K. (2015). The Russo-Japanese War. In Pacific strife (pp. 417–438). Amsterdam University Press.
- Walder, D. (1974). The short victorious war: The Russo-Japanese conflict, 1904–5. Harper & Row.

== Military history ==
- Connaughton, R. M. (2003). The war of the rising sun and the tumbling bear: A military history of the Russo-Japanese War, 1904–5. Cassell.
- Hough, R. A. (1960). The fleet that had to die. Ballantine Books.
- Jentschura, H., Jung, D., & Mickel, P. (1976). Warships of the Imperial Japanese Navy, 1869–1945. United States Naval Institute. (Note: Originally published in German as Die japanischen Kriegsschiffe 1869–1945 in 1970; translated into English by David Brown and Antony Preston.)
- Lardas, M. (2019). Russian battleships and cruisers of the Russo-Japanese War (P. Wright, Illus.). Osprey Publishing.
- Pleshakov, C. V. (2002). The tsar's last armada: The epic voyage to the Battle of Tsushima. Basic Books.
- Stille, M. (2016). The Imperial Japanese Navy of the Russo-Japanese War (P. Wright, Illus.). Osprey Publishing.

== Works focused on Russia ==
- Esthus, R. (1981). Nicholas II and the Russo-Japanese War. The Russian Review, 40(4), 396–411.
- Menning, B. (2006). Miscalculating one's enemies: Russian military intelligence before the Russo-Japanese War. War in History, 13(2), 141–170.
- Papastratigakis, N. (2011). Russian imperialism and naval power: Military strategy and the build-up to the Russo-Japanese War. I. B. Tauris.
- Perabo, B. C. (2017). Russian Orthodoxy and the Russo-Japanese War. Bloomsbury Academic.

== Works focused on Japan ==
- Koda, Y. (2005). The Russo-Japanese War: Primary causes of Japanese success. Naval War College Review, 58(2), 10–44.
- Kublin, H. (1950). The Japanese socialists and the Russo-Japanese War. The Journal of Modern History, 22(4), 322–339.
- Okamoto, S. (1970). The Japanese oligarchy and the Russo-Japanese War. Columbia University Press.
- Shimazu, N. (2008). Patriotic and despondent: Japanese society at war, 1904–5. The Russian Review, 67(1), 34–49.

== International focused works ==
- Crowley, D. (2008). Seeing Japan, imagining Poland: Polish art and the Russo-Japanese War. The Russian Review, 67(1), 50–69.
- Dua, R. (1973). United States and the Russo-Japanese War (1904–5). Proceedings of the Indian History Congress, 34, 273–279.
- Long, J. (1974). Franco-Russian relations during the Russo-Japanese War. The Slavonic and East European Review, 52(127), 213–233.
- May, E. (1957). The Far Eastern policy of the United States in the period of the Russo-Japanese War: A Russian view. The American Historical Review, 62(2), 345–351.
- Morris, E. (2002). The best herder of emperors since Napoleon. In Theodore Rex (Chap. 24). Random House. Google Books
- Valliant, R. (1974). The selling of Japan: Japanese manipulation of Western opinion, 1900–1905. Monumenta Nipponica, 29(4), 415–438.
- White, J. A. (2016). The diplomacy of the Russo-Japanese War. Princeton University Press.

== Historiography and memory studies ==
- Cohen, A. (2010). Long ago and far away: War monuments, public relations, and the memory of the Russo-Japanese War in Russia, 1907–14. The Russian Review, 69(3), 388–411.
- Kowner, R. (2007). Rethinking the Russo-Japanese War, 1904–05: Centennial perspectives. Global Oriental.
- Steinberg, J. W. (2008). Was the Russo-Japanese War World War Zero?. The Russian Review, 67(1), 1–7.
- Swafford, K. (2015). "In the thick of it": The (meta)discourse of Jack London's Russo-Japanese War correspondence. Pacific Coast Philology, 50(1), 82–102.
- Van der Oye, D. (2008). Rewriting the Russo-Japanese War: A centenary retrospective. The Russian Review, 67(1), 78–87.

== Primary sources ==
A limited number of English language primary sources referred to in the above works.

- The Treaty of Portsmouth, 1905 – September 5, 1905. Brigham Young University.
- Correspondence regarding the negotiations between Japan and Russia (1903–1904), presented to the Imperial Diet, March 1904. Japanese Ministry of Foreign Affairs.
- Novikov-Priboy, A. (1936). Tsushima. Alfred A. Knopf. (Note: An account from a seaman aboard the Russian battleship Oryol, which was captured at Tsushima.)

== Reference works ==
- Kowner, R. (2006). Historical dictionary of the Russo-Japanese War. Scarecrow Press.

== See also ==
- Foreign policy of the Russian Empire
- Government of Meiji Japan
- Korea under Japanese rule
- Treaty of Portsmouth
