= List of battles of the Russo-Japanese War =

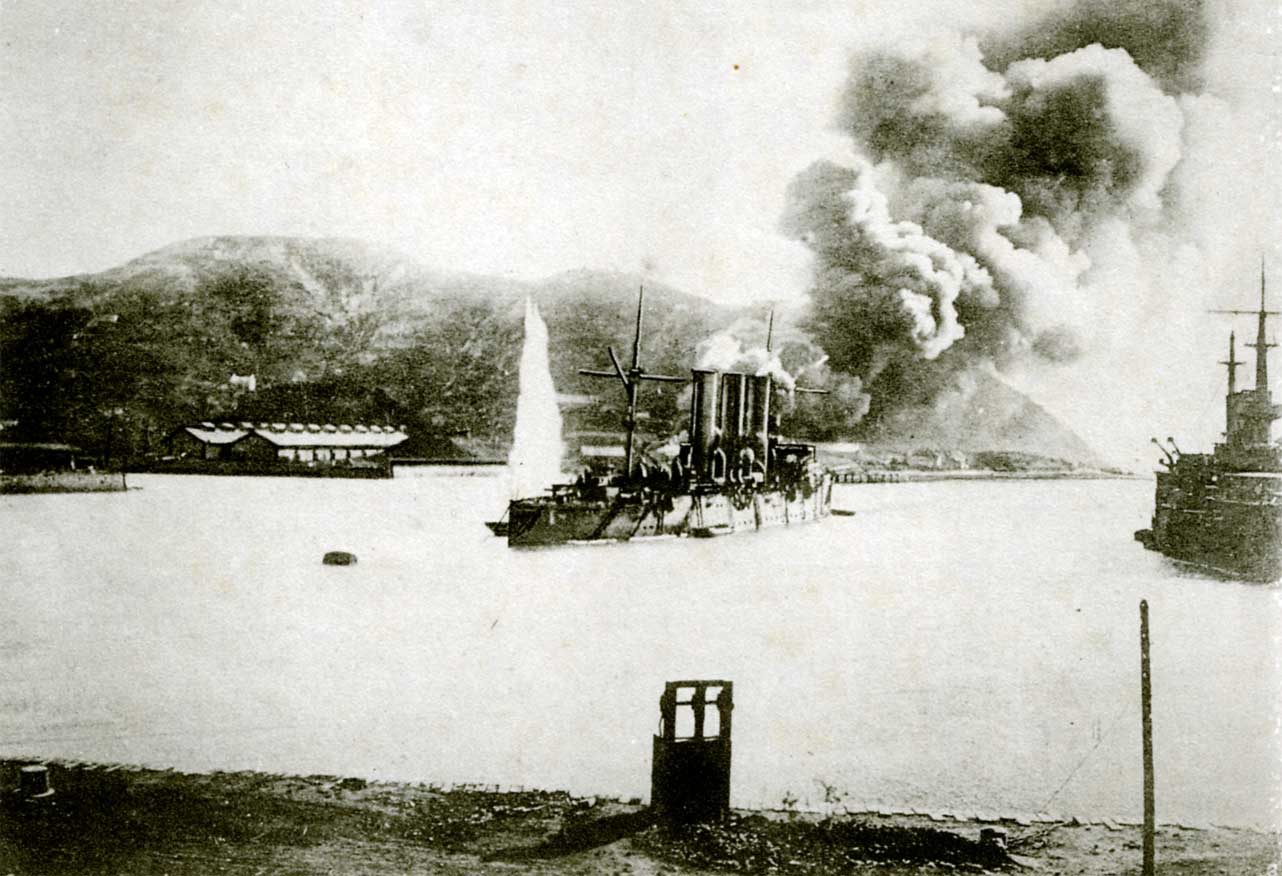
Bombardment during the Siege of Port Arthur (September 30, 1904 – January 2, 1905)

The following are known battles of the Russo-Japanese War, including all major engagements.

The Russo-Japanese War lasted from 1904 to 1905. The conflict grew out of the rival imperialist ambitions of the Russian Empire and the Japanese Empire over Manchuria and Korea. The major theatres of operations were Southern Manchuria, specifically the area around the Liaodong Peninsula and Mukden, and the seas around Korea, Japan, and the Yellow Sea.

The Russians were in constant pursuit of a warm-water port on the Pacific Ocean, for their navy as well as for maritime trade. The recently established Pacific seaport of Vladivostok was the only active Russian port that was reasonably operational during the summer season; but Port Arthur would be operational all year. Negotiations between the Tsar's government and Japan between the end of the First Sino-Japanese War (1894–1895) and 1903 had proved futile. The Japanese chose war to maintain exclusive dominance in Korea.

The resulting campaigns, in which the fledgling Japanese military consistently attained victory over the Russian forces arrayed against them, were unexpected by world observers. These victories, as time transpired, would dramatically transform the balance of power in East Asia, resulting in a sober reassessment of Japan's recent entry onto the world stage. The embarrassing string of defeats increased dissatisfaction of the Russian populace with the inefficient and corrupt Tsarist government, and was a major cause of the Russian Revolution of 1905.

== List of battles ==
Battle	Location	Date	Notes	Result
Battle of Port Arthur	Port Arthur, Manchuria (modern Lüshunkou)	8–9 February 1904	The Imperial Japanese Navy attacks the Russian Pacific Fleet at Port Arthur.	Inconclusive
Battle of Chemulpo Bay	Chemulpo Bay, Korea (modern Incheon)	9 February 1904	The Imperial Japanese Navy completes its attack of the Russian Pacific Fleet at Chemulpo Bay.	Japanese victory
Battle of the Yalu River	Wiju, Korea (modern Uiju)	30 April–1 May 1904	Russian forces fail to hold a line at the Yalu River in the face of a Japanese attack.	Japanese victory
Battle of Nanshan	Liaotung peninsula, Manchuria (modern Liaodong peninsula)	25–26 May 1904	Japanese troops take Chinchou and Dalny.	Japanese victory
Battle of Te-li-Ssu	Outside Wafangdian, Manchuria	14–15 June 1904	Japanese and Russian forces skirmish near Wafangdian.	Japanese victory
Hitachi Maru Incident	Tsushima Strait	15 June 1904	Three Japanese military transports were sunk in a Russian commerce raiding sortie by a Vladivostok-based armored cruiser squadron of the Imperial Russian Navy	Russian victory
Battle of Motien Pass	Liaotung peninsula, Manchuria (modern Liaodong peninsula)	27 June 1904	Russian troops abandon the critical Motien Pass.	Japanese victory
Battle of Tashihchiao	Tashihchiao, Manchuria (modern Dashiqiao)	24–25 July 1904	Japanese forces take the village of Tashihchiao.	Japanese victory
Siege of Port Arthur	Port Arthur, Manchuria (modern Lüshunkou)	30 July 1904–2 January 1905	Japanese forces successfully lay siege to Port Arthur.	Japanese victory
Battle of Hsimucheng	Hsimucheng, Manchuria	31 July 1904	Russian forces are forced to abandon the village of Hsimucheng.	Japanese victory
Battle of the Yellow Sea	Off Shantung, Manchuria (modern Shandong)	10 August 1904	The Japanese and Russian navies fight to a stalemate.	Inconclusive
Battle off Ulsan	Off Ulsan, Korea	14 August 1904	Russian naval units are forced to cease their interference with Japanese shipping.	Japanese victory
Battle of Korsakov	Off Korsakov, Russia	20 August 1904	Russian cruiser Novik forced to scuttle herself.	Japanese victory
Battle of Liaoyang	Liaoyang, Manchuria	24 August–4 September 1904	Japanese troops occupy Liaoyang.	Japanese victory
Battle of Shaho	Sha River, Manchuria	5–17 October 1904	Both sides sustain heavy casualties in a Russian attack.	Inconclusive
Raid on Yingkou	Manchuria	9 January 1905	Russian troops were able to inflict a number of major defeats on the Japanese and disrupt logistics. Most of the large warehouses in Yingkou were destroyed.	Japanese victory
Battle of Sandepu	South of Mukden, Manchuria (modern Shenyang)	25–29 January 1905	A Russian attack commences in freezing cold, causing both sides to sustain heavy casualties.	Inconclusive
Battle of Mukden	Mukden, Manchuria (modern Shenyang)	20 February–10 March 1905	Russian forces are encircled by Japanese and forced to abandon Mukden.	Japanese victory
Battle of Tsushima	Straits of Tsushima	27–28 May 1905	The Japanese navy destroys the Russian fleet in the Straits of Tsushima.	Japanese victory

== See also ==
- First Sino-Japanese War (1894–1895)
- Russian invasion of Manchuria (1900)
- Russian Revolution of 1905
