= Sueki Yonemura =

Japanese admiral (1879–1941)

Sueki Yonemura Junior Fifth Rank
- 米村 末喜
- Born: March 13, 1879; Tenmei, Kumamoto, Japan
- Died: December 27, 1941 (aged 62)
- Education: Imperial Japanese Naval Academy
- Military career
- Branch: Imperial Japanese Navy
- Service years: 1901–1930
- Rank: Vice Admiral
- Conflicts: Russo-Japanese War; Battle of Tsushima; World War I

Sueki Yonemura (Japanese: 米村 末喜, Hepburn: Yonemura Sueki; March 13, 1879 – December 27, 1941) was a Japanese vice admiral the Russo-Japanese War and World War I. He was nicknamed "The God of Navigation" due to the navigational achievements made during his career, serving as the chief navigator of several major battleships.

== Biography ==
Born in Tenmei, Kumamoto Prefecture as the second son of Kokuzo Yonemura (Modern-day Kumamoto City), he graduated from the 29th Class of the Imperial Japanese Naval Academy on December 14, 1901, ranking 39th out of 125. He graduated as a torpedo practice student after serving aboard the Asama and Fuji. After serving aboard the Oboro, he participated in the Russo-Japanese War as a squad leader of the special fleet flagship Taichung Maru. He was the commander of the Ehime Maru during the Battle of Tsushima.

After the war, he became a torpedo training student again and while he was a sub-lieutenant, he developed an interest in the torpedo field. After completing several courses specializing in torpedoes, he served as chief navigator of seven ships, an instructor at the Imperial Japanese Naval Academy twice and an instructor at the Imperial Japanese Naval Academy. During World War I, he went to war as a navigator of the Asama and was involved in the search for the German fleet. He also collaborated with the American Expeditionary Forces, as he was entrusted with trade protection, but due to uncharted rocks and other causes, he ran aground.

Promoted to captain on December 1, 1920, he became the captain of the Training Fleet, Asama, and along with Mitsumasa Yonai, the captain of the Iwate, who was a close friend of his contemporaries, instructed second lieutenant candidates on ocean voyages . On this voyage, there is an anecdote between Yonai and his cadet, Ikutora Masaki, in which Yonemura politely instructed a cadet who criticized his actions and Masaki was impressed. After that, he went on a business trip to Europe and the United States and served as the captain of the IJN Ise.

Promoted to rear admiral on December 1, 1925, he was appointed Chief of the Hydrographic Department, the highest position within the navigation department and held this post for five years. During his tenure, he was a government representative to the International Hydrographic Congress. Major Eiji Kusakari, who committed suicide, was one of his subordinates who accompanied him at this time. He was in charge of fleet movements and naval affairs as an instructor at the Imperial Japanese Naval Academy.

In 1927, with the aim of disseminating maritime thought not only within the naval department but also among the general public, he wrote "The Story of Voyage" and published it from the Society for the Advancement of Science. On November 30, 1929, he was promoted to vice admiral and on December 24, 1930, he was transferred to reserve duty.

Since then, he has served on the board of a company involved in weapons manufacturing. Yonemura would later write the 10 Rules for manipulating ships within the naval department. Yonemura got married at some point and had two daughters.

== Court Ranks ==
- Senior Eight Rank (April 10, 1903)
- Junior Seventh Rank (August 30, 1904)
- Junior Fifth Rank (January 20, 1921)

== Awards ==
- Order of the Sacred Treasure, 2nd Class (August 1, 1929)
