= Abdul-bey Tabasaransky =

Russian military leader

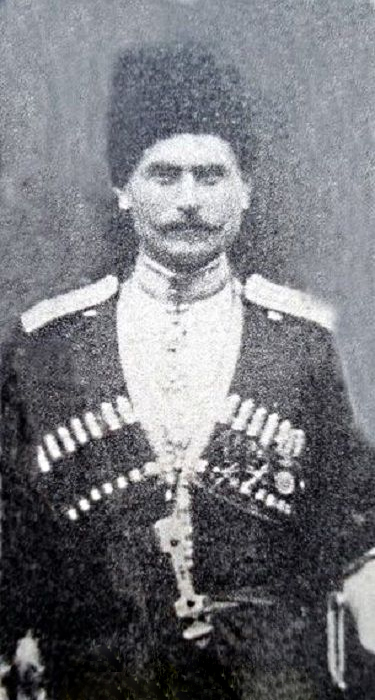
- Born: December 15, 1870 unknown
- Died: March 19, 1918 (aged 47–48) Baku, Azerbaijan Democratic Republic
- Allegiance: Russian Empire
- Branch: cavalry
- Battles / wars: Russo-Japanese War, World War I
- Awards: Order of St. Anna Order of St. Stanislaus Order of St. Vladimir Golden Weapon for Bravery

Abdul-bey Tabasaransky (Russian: Абдул-бек Табасаранский, 1870–1918) was a Russian military leader and colonel.

== Biography ==
He comes from the beys of the Kaytago-Tabasaransky okrug of the Dagestan region. He began his studies at a realschule in Baku. He entered the service on August 24, 1889, as a one-year volunteer in the 46th Dragoon Pereyaslav regiment of His Majesty, then he graduated from the Elisavetgrad cavalry cadet school. Released in the 41st Yamburg Dragoon regiment. Since 1891, he has been a cornet, since 1895 - a lieutenant, in 1900 he is a staff captain, and since 1903 - a captain. He also participated in the Russo-Japanese War. On April 16, 1904, he was seconded to the 2nd Dagestan Cavalry Regiment, renamed into podsauls (Cossack staff captain). For military distinction, he was promoted to captain. On January 12, 1905, he was wounded in battle.

Since July 17, 1906, he served as a lieutenant colonel. On January 1, 1906, he was the commander of the 2nd hundred of the Dagestan cavalry regiment. During the World War I, he participated in the Dagestan сavalry кegiment. On April 18, 1915 "for distinction in cases against the enemy" he was awarded the Highest favor. From December 9, 1915, to May 18, 1917, he was the commander of the Ossetian cavalry regiment.

He was killed in Baku by the Dashnaks in March 1918.

== Family ==
The family of Abdul-bey had five children, two sons and three daughters. His eldest son was killed, second son Edkhem emigrated to Turkey and three sisters left for Central Asia and got families with children. Currently, the 77-year-old grandson of Abdul-bey - Edkhem Bakiyev (born 1945) lives in Bishkek (Kyrgyzstan).

== Awards ==
- Order of St. Anna 3rd class with swords and bow (1904)
- Order of St. Stanislaus 2nd class with swords (1906)
- Order of St. Anna 2nd class with swords (1906)
- Order of St. Anna 4th class (1906)
- Order of St. Vladimir 4th with swords and bow (1906)
- Order of St. Vladimir 3rd with swords (01/16/1916)
- Golden Weapon for Bravery (01/06/1917)
- The highest favor (04/18/1915)

== See also ==
- Nuh-bey Tarkovsky
- Dagestan
- Russo-Japanese War
