= Smolensk (1901 ship) =

England ship

History

Russian Empire
- Name: Smolensk
- Owner: Dobroflot
- Builder: Hawthorn Leslie, Newcastle-upon-Tyne
- Launched: 1901
- Commissioned: 1902
- Fate: Transferred to Imperial Russian Navy early 1904

Russian Empire
- Name: Rion
- Acquired: 1904
- Commissioned: 25 October 1904
- Stricken: c. 1922
- Fate: Scrapped c. 1922

General characteristics (Smolensk)
- Type: Auxiliary cruiser
- Tonnage: 12,050 GRT
- Length: 506 ft (154.2 m)
- Beam: 58 ft (17.7 m)
- Depth of hold: 37 ft (11.3 m)
- Decks: 3
- Installed power: 16,500 horsepower (12,304 kW)
- Propulsion: Triple expansion engines, 2 screws, auxiliary sails
- Speed: 20.5 knots (38.0 km/h; 23.6 mph) (trials); 17.0 knots (31.5 km/h; 19.6 mph) (sustained speed); 12.5 knots (23.2 km/h; 14.4 mph) (official cruising speed)
- Troops: 86 officers; 1,506 other ranks
- Complement: 470 as cruiser; 230 ship's crew; 240 for prize crews
- Crew: 174 as merchant ship
- Armament: 8 × 120 mm breechloading guns; 8 × 75 mm breechloading guns

Smolensk (Russian: Смоленск; named for the city of the same name) was a ship built in England in 1901, ostensibly as a merchant vessel for the Russian state-controlled Dobroflot shipping line, but designed to double as a cruiser of the Imperial Russian Navy, in which role she adopted the name Rion (Russian: Рион; the river Rioni in the Caucasus). The ship saw active service in the Russo-Japanese War.

== Design and construction ==
Smolensk was built by Hawthorn Leslie at Newcastle-upon-Tyne, the last in a series of ships of similar concept but increasing capability constructed there for Dobroflot. The hull was large and slender, measuring 506 feet (154 m) in length and 58 feet (18 m) in beam, powered by twenty-four coal-fired Belleville boilers beneath three tall funnels, and two sets of triple expansion machinery driving twin propellers, which enabled the ship to achieve speeds of better than 20 knots (37 km/h; 23 mph), and cruise comfortably at around 17 knots (31 km/h; 20 mph).

The engines were designed to continue to provide power if they were battle-damaged, and the hull was compartmentalised with transverse bulkheads which allowed the ship to remain afloat if two hull sections were completely flooded, and fitted with powerful bilge pumps that could counteract flooding. There were ammunition magazines and a shell hoist, and mountings for an armament of eight 4.7-inch (120 mm) guns and eight 75-millimetre (3.0 in) guns, arranged in pairs on either side of the hull. In service, these were supplemented by two 47 mm (1.9 in) Hotchkiss guns and two machine guns on the bridge, and additional military equipment such as a radio, searchlights and signal lamps could also be quickly set up. Speed and firepower were more than adequate for the ship's intended commerce raiding role, and were broadly comparable to contemporary protected cruisers like the British Pelorus class and Topaze class.

Notwithstanding its military features, the ship had a classic mercantile appearance with a raised forecastle and poop separated by lower well decks from a central bridge superstructure, and two masts fore and aft. The interior of the ship also contained more deck and hold space than was usual on a warship, fitted out for mercantile purposes with a mix of passenger cabins, steerage accommodation to allow it to serve as an emigrant ship, and large holds for bulk cargo. Nonetheless, these aspects of the ship's design also had a military function - the civilian passenger accommodation allowed Smolensk to serve as a troopship with a capacity of 86 officers and 1,506 other ranks, and the cargo holds could be used as large coal bunkers to maximise the ship's steaming range, tripling its notional endurance to a very impressive 17,000 nautical miles (31,000 km; 20,000 mi).

As a civilian vessel, the Smolensk had a notional crew of 174, but in military configuration, she carried a total of 470, although only 230 were actually needed to work the ship, the other 240 being assigned in order to serve as prize crews on captured ships.

== Career ==
The Smolensk was ordered in 1899 and launched in 1901, ostensibly destined for use on a passenger service to the Far East. The name was assigned in recognition of a substantial contribution to Dobroflot funds from Smolensk Governorate. But construction was overseen by a naval officer, Captain 2nd Rank Pyotr Arkadievich Troyan, and when the ship arrived in Russia in 1902, it was used as a troopship in the Black Sea.

=== Indian Ocean ===
In 1904, the Smolensk was reassigned, with other Dobroflot vessels, to tow the Imperial Navy torpedo boats No. 221, No. 222 and No. 223 to their new base in the Far East, but when the Russo-Japanese War began, her role was changed. The ship thus sailed south on 22 June 1904 (5 July New Style), with Captain Troyan in command, preceded by another Dobroflot ship, the Petersburg. They were both ostensibly carrying a cargo of coal and coastal artillery to Vladivostok, but after passing through the Suez Canal, the two ships changed their commercial flags for naval ones, mounted their guns and other military equipment, painted their hulls black, and began to conduct a commerce-raiding campaign in the Red Sea and Indian Ocean, designed to intercept military equipment being shipped to Japan in neutral-flagged cargo ships.

Between them, the two cruisers stopped eighteen ships in July 1904, with the Smolensk detaining three as carriers of military contraband to Japan, the Ardova, Scandia and Formosa, which were sent back under prize crews, with orders to sail to Libau in the Baltic Sea. The Smolensk, with her superior range, then turned south, cruising as far as Port Elizabeth in South Africa, though she only encountered one more ship, a small steamer which was simply searched and released.

The cruise of the Smolensk and her consort provoked particular alarm in Great Britain, as they were able to detain British merchant ships suspected of carrying military supplies for Japan, and the Royal Navy had no ability to intervene. Above all, offence was taken at the capture by the Petersburg of the prestigious P&O liner SS Malacca in mid-July. More formal objections were raised to the fact that the two raiders had begun their voyage as merchant ships and abruptly switched identities once they arrived in the Indian Ocean.

Behind the rhetoric, the raid had the effect of suspending sailings for Japan by the three leading British shipping firms and imposing prohibitive insurance premiums on freight, illustrating the ability of large surface raiders to disrupt global trade for the first time since the age of sail. Political negotiations were initiated by the British government, as a result of which the captured ships were to be released, and the two cruisers were ordered home.

By an arrangement between the governments, encrypted orders to end their cruise and return were dispatched aboard the Royal Navy cruiser HMS Forte, although as the Admiralty in London were aware, the British ship was rather outgunned. The Forte located the two raiders at Zanzibar on August 24, 1904 (6 September New Style). Perhaps by coincidence, this was the day that their mission was always scheduled to end. The two ships sailed for the Baltic, with some sources dating their arrival at Libau to 30 September 1904 (13 October N.S.), others dating the arrival a month later on to October 31 (13 November N.S).

=== Far East ===
On 12 October 1904 (25 October N.S.), the Smolensk was renamed as the Rion, to emphasise the ship's transfer from Dobroflot to the Navy, with Petersburg being similarly renamed Dnepr. On 3 November 1904 (16 November N.S.), the two ships sailed again to join the Russian Pacific Fleet, sailing via the Cape of Good Hope in company with the more powerful protected cruisers Oleg and Izumrud and two destroyers.

On 12 May 1905 (25 May, New Style) the two raiders were detached with orders to escort a convoy of transports to Shanghai and then conduct commerce-raiding on Japanese lines of communication in the Yellow Sea, They thus appear to have avoided being present at the disastrous Battle of Tsushima on 14–15 May 1905 (27-28 May N.S.). After departing Shanghai, Rion captured two more prizes, the German steamship SS Tetartos (2409 brt) and British steamship SS Cilurnum (2123 brt) before arriving at Batavia (modern Jakarta) on 14 June.

The Rion now set out to return home. Later that month, the ship rescued passengers and crew from a French vessel which had gone aground off the Horn of Africa, and eventually arrived back at Kronstadt in the Baltic Sea on 18 July 1905 (31 July NS). In September 1905, the Treaty of Portsmouth brought an end to the conflict.

=== Later voyages ===
The ship was returned to Dobroflot, officially resuming her original name of Smolensk, before being refitted at Hawthorn Leslie and conducting transatlantic passenger voyages to New York in 1906 and 1907.

In 1908 the ship reverted to military control and returned to the Black Sea, serving variously as a military transport, a depot ship and a training vessel, and spending some years simply out of service. In these years, the ship's name alternated depending on her role, being variously Smolensk, or Rion, or simply designated by a number. By 1918, the ship seems to have been largely confined to harbour, but due to rapid and tumultuous shifts of political and military front-lines, it changed hands a number of times, at various times being controlled by the Provisional Government, the Bolsheviks, the German Army, the White Guard, the British Royal Navy and Wrangel's fleet. In 1919, the ship was moved to Novorossiysk and used as an accommodation hulk, but was made seaworthy during 1920, and embarked on its final cruise as a refugee vessel. Sources are inconsistent about the ship's subsequent movements; some say it sailed to Istanbul, others to Bizerte, or Corsica. According to some sources, the ship was sold for scrap in Marseille in 1922, and subsequently broken up in Italy. Others say she was broken up at Toulon.

The Smolensk and Petersburg were controversial ships in their day. In the British Admiralty's official analysis of the naval war of 1904–1905, the naval historian and theorist Sir Julian Corbett condemned their activities, and referred to them as "the two notorious cruisers Dnyepr and Rion". Prime Minister Balfour was more conciliatory, however, reminding the British Parliament that the raiders were simply enforcing the same accepted rules that the Royal Navy had rigorously applied to neutral shipping in her own wars for centuries.
