= Nikolai Aleksandrovich Brzozovsky =

Russian general (1858–1930)

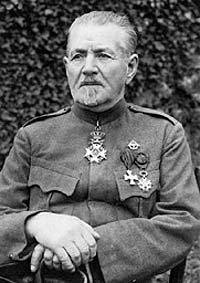
- Born: Rzhevsky Uyezd, Tver Governorate, Russian Empire
- Military career
- Allegiance: Russian Empire
- Branch: Imperial Russian Army
- Service years: 1874–1920
- Rank: Lieutenant General
- Conflicts: Russo-Turkish War; Boxer Rebellion; Russo-Japanese War; World War I; Russian Civil War

Nikolay Aleksandrovich Brzhozovsky (Russian: Николай Александрович Бржозовский; 1 January 1858 [O.S. 20 December] 1857, Barygino, Tver Governorate – c. 1930, Risan, Kotor), was a Russian lieutenant general. He participated in the Russo-Turkish War, Boxer Rebellion, Russo-Japanese War, World War I, and the Russian Civil War.

== Biography ==
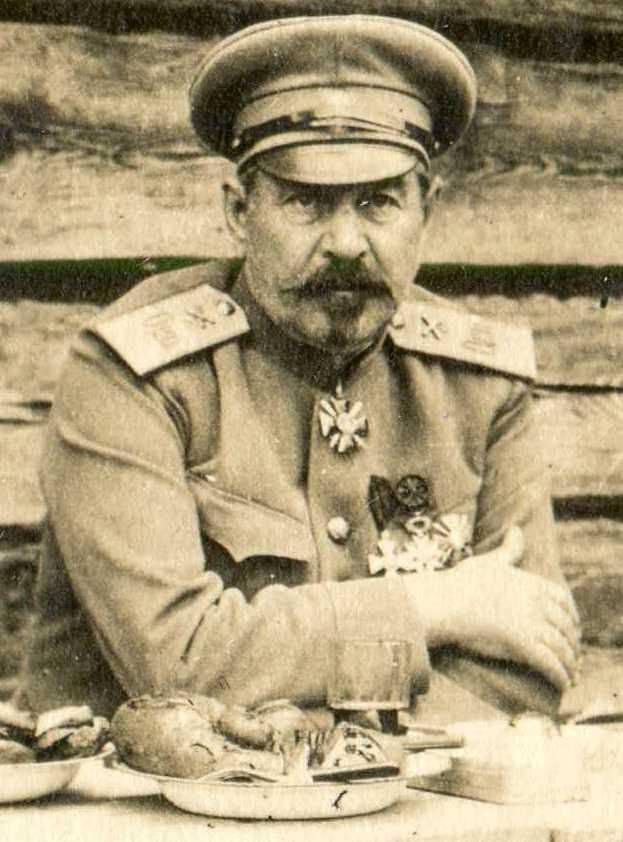
General Brzhozovsky in the Osowiec fortress, 1915.

Brzozovsky was born on 20 December 1857 (1 January 1858) in Barygino (now in the Rzhevsky District of the Tver Oblast). He was from the nobility and educated at the Polotsk Military Gymnasium. He entered service on 1 September 1874. He graduated from the 2nd Konstantinovsky Military School and released as an ensign (seniority from 10 August 1876) in the 16th Artillery Brigade (Volkovysk).

He participated in the Russo-Turkish War from 1877 to 1878 and was promoted Second lieutenant (seniority since 26 December 1877), lieutenant (seniority since 18 December 1878). Staff captain (seniority since 12 November 1884). Captain (seniority since 13 December 1892). He commanded a company for fourteen years and two months; a siege artillery company. (14 December 1900 – 1 June 1901).

Brzozovsky participated in the Boxer Rebellion and was promoted Lieutenant Colonel (for military distinctions; order of 1901; seniority from 15 June 1901).

Brzozovsky Participated in the Russo-Japanese War and was promoted to Colonel (for military distinctions; order of 1905; seniority from 9 August 1904). He was wounded and shell-shocked.

Brzozovsky was commander of the Lomza Fortress Artillery (24 July 1906 – 20 December 1911). Major General (for distinction; order of 1911; seniority from 20 December 1911). From 20 December 1911 – Chief of the Osowiec Fortress Artillery.

He was awarded the Order of St. George, 4th Class (the highest order of 21 March 1915) "for the fact that during the bombardment of the Osowiec fortress, on 13–16 September 1914, commanding the entire fortress artillery, as well as the troops of the 1st defense department, being under real fire, by his actions ... he contributed to repelling the attack on the fortress and the subsequent victorious offensive of our troops both from the fortress and from the town of Goniondz." Commandant of the Osowiec fortress (since 8 April 1915). During the siege of the fortress, he offered a German envoy, who proposed to surrender the fortress, to remain in it during the assault on the condition that if the assault was unsuccessful, the German would be hanged, and if the fortress was taken, then let him (Brzhozovsky) be hanged. The fortress held out. Lieutenant General (order of 6 December 1915; seniority from 7 August 1915). On 10 July 1916 - in the same rank and position. Commander of the 44th Army Corps (June 1916 - 22 April 1917). From 22 April 1917 - commandant of the Sveaborg Fortress.

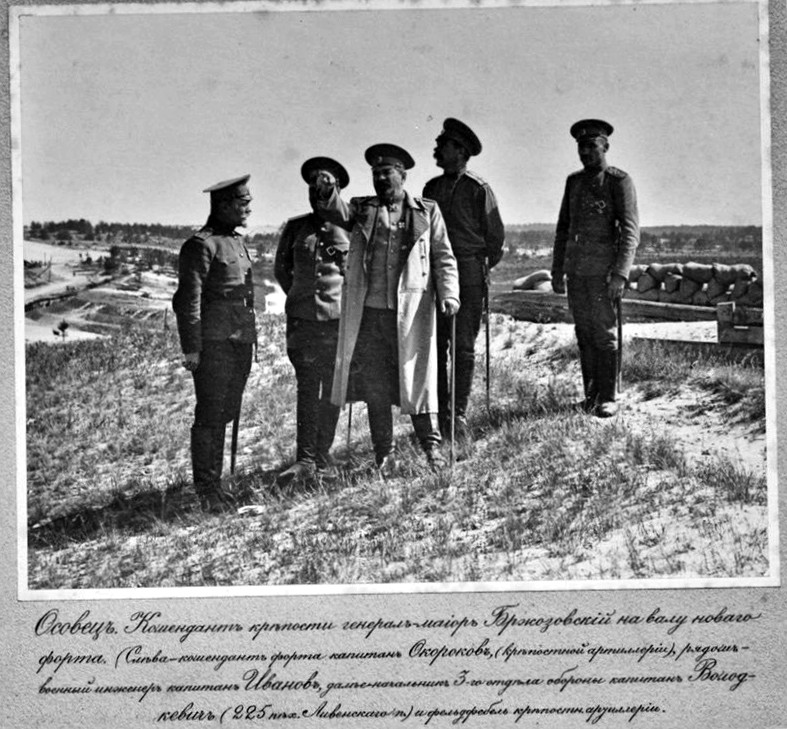
Commandant of the Osowiec fortress, Brzhozovsky, on the rampart of the new fort of the fortress, 1915.

Brzozovsky participated in the White movement in the south of Russia. On 10 July 1919, he arrived to serve in the troops of the Northern Oblast at the disposal of the Governor-General of the Northern Region, from 17 July 1919, he was in the reserve of ranks at the headquarters of the Commander-in-Chief. On 21 July, he was appointed head of the garrison of Arkhangelsk and the environs. On September 1 of the same year, he was appointed deputy governor-general of the Northern Region. On 28 September, he was appointed chief of defense of Arkhangelsk. Chairman of the Georgievsk Duma of the Northern Region.

Following the Russian Civil War, he went to exile. On 20 April 1920, he was registered at the Varnes military camp in Norway. In the 1920s, he lived in Yugoslavia and was a member of the Artillery Officers' Society. He was the director of the nursing home in Prčanj. In 1930, he lived in the nursing home in Risan (now in Montenegro)

According to unconfirmed reports, he died on 6 October 1930.

== Awards ==
- Order of St. Anne, 4th degree (1877)
- Order of St. Vladimir, 4th degree with swords and bow (1878)
- Order of St. Anne, 3rd degree (1893)
- Order of St. Stanislav, 2nd degree (1896)
- Order of St. Vladimir, 3rd degree with swords (1905)
- Golden Sabre "For Bravery" (10/23/1905)
- Order of St. Stanislav, 1st degree (1913)
- Order of St. George, 4th degree (03/21/1915)
- Order of St. Anne, 1st degree with swords (04/23/1915)
- Order of St. Vladimir, 2nd degree with swords (10/15/1915)

== Literature ==
- Суряев В., Малишевский Н. Комендант крепости Осовец Николай Александрович Бржозовский (рус.) // Славные имена Белой Руси : Белая гвардия Белой Руси / Авт.-сост.: Н. Н. Малишевский. — М.: ММО «CIS-EMO»: ИП Лобанов В. И.: Книжный мир, 2017. — С. 29–41. — ISBN 978-5-9500726-6-6.
