= Pavel Mishchenko =

Russian general (1853–1918)

Pavel Ivanovich Mishchenko
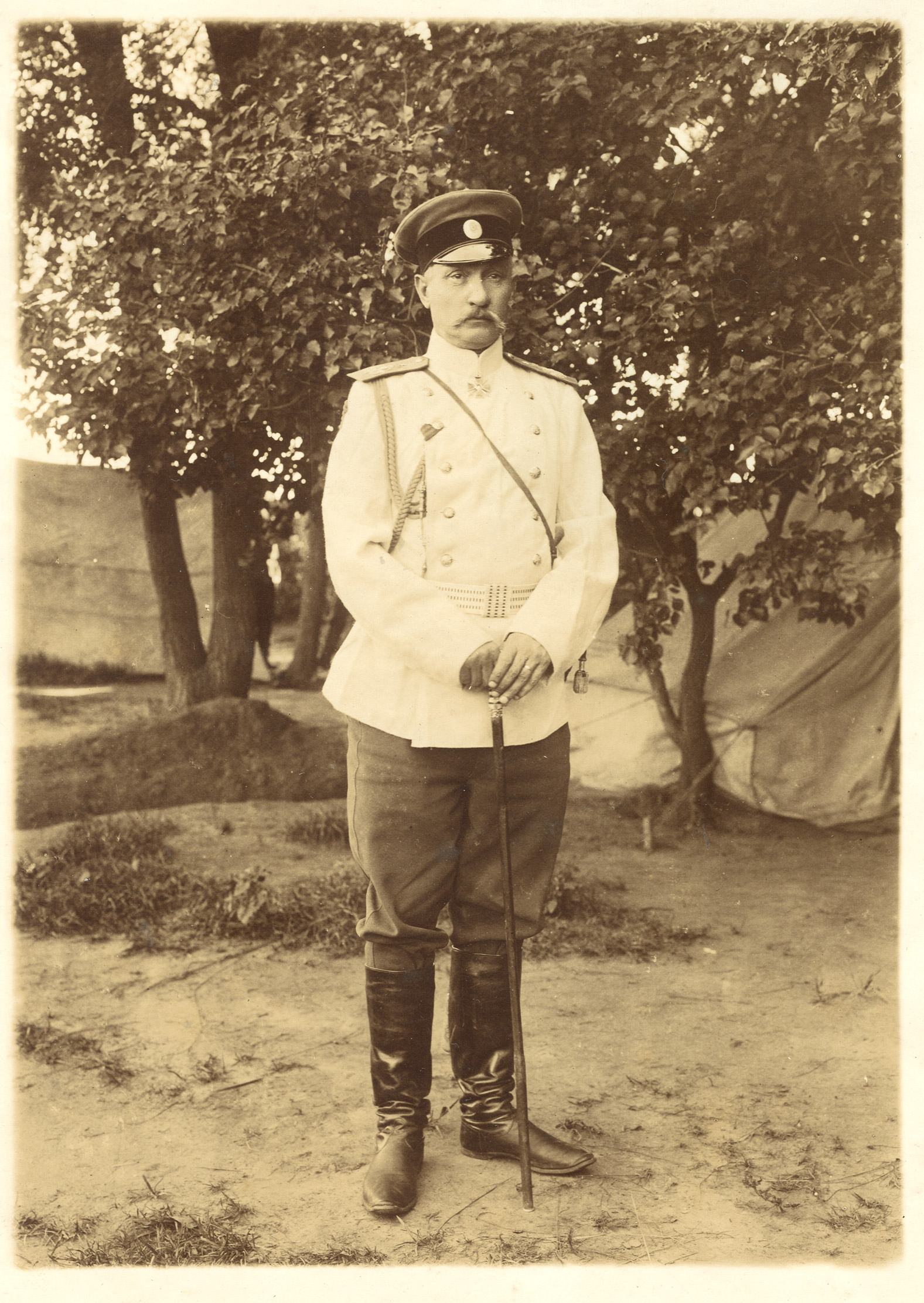
- Pavel Mishchenko, General of the Artillery
- Born: January 22, 1853; Temir-Khan-Shura, Dagestan Oblast, Caucasus Viceroyalty, Russian Empire
- Died: 1918; Temir-Khan-Shura, Russian SFSR
- Military career
- Allegiance: Russian Empire
- Branch: Imperial Russian Army
- Service years: 1871–1917
- Rank: General of the artillery
- Conflicts: See list: Russo-Turkish War; Boxer Rebellion; Russo Japanese War; Battle of the Yalu River (1904); Battle of Hsimucheng; Battle of Te-li-Ssu; Battle of Liaoyang; Battle of Shaho; Raid on Yingkou; Battle of Sandepu (WIA); World War I

Pavel Ivanovich Mishchenko (Russian: Па́вел Ива́нович Ми́щенко; Pavlo Ivanovych Mishchenko; 22 January 1853 – 1918) was an Imperial Russian career military officer and statesman of the Imperial Russian Army.

== Biography ==
Mishchenko was born in 1853 in the Russian fortress settlement of Temir-Khan-Shura in the Dagestan Oblast of the Caucasus Viceroyalty. He graduated in 1871 from Pavlovsk Military School as an officer in the artillery, and was assigned to the 38th Artillery Brigade. He participated in the Russian conquest of Central Asia in 1873.

He subsequently participated in the Russo-Turkish War (1877-1878) and the conquest of Russian Turkestan under General Mikhail Skobelev. From 1899, Mischchenko was assigned to Russian-occupied Manchuria as assistant chief of security for the Chinese Eastern Railway. He fought during the Boxer Rebellion, and afterwards was promoted to major general and decorated with the Order of St. George (4th degree).

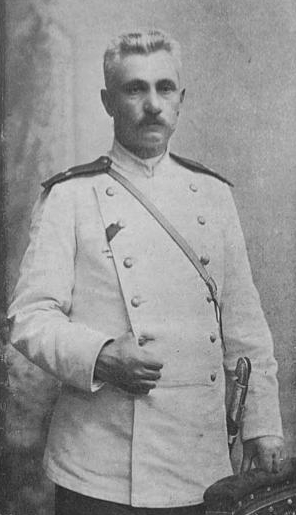
General Mishchenko in Manchuria,1900

From 1903, Mischchenko was commander of the Trans-Baikal Cossack Brigade. During the Russo-Japanese War of 1904-1905 he commanded a separate East-Baikal Cossack Brigade, which was active in many of the battles of that war. Initially, his forces were in Korea, with instructions to obstruct the landing of the Japanese First Army and its march towards Manchuria. However, after several minor skirmishes, Mischchenko retreated across the Yalu River. He played a minor role on the flanks of the Battle of the Yalu River, and was also part of the Russian defenses at the Battle of Hsimucheng, and Battle of Te-li-Ssu. At the Battle of Liaoyang and at the Battle of Shaho, he commanded the Russian cavalry formations covering the rear guard of the Russian retreat. He was promoted to lieutenant general in October 1904, and appointed commander of the new Cavalier Corps in December 1904 and led a major raid south on 6 January 1905 with 6000 horsemen on a mission to destroy Japanese supplies stockpiled at Niuzhuang. The mission was a disaster, and the force returned twelve days later with massive casualties. He was wounded in the leg during the Battle of Sandepu and although reinstated as commander of the Cavalier Corps in March 1905, was not in the Battle of Mukden.

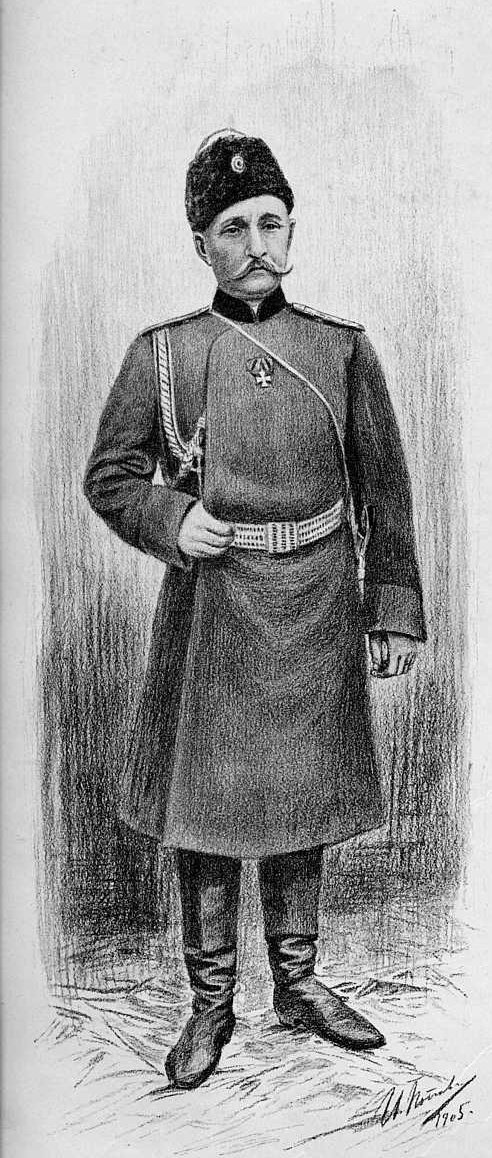
General Mishchenko in 1905

After the war, from 2 May 1908 to 17 March 1909, Mischchenko was commander of the Turkestan Military District and Governor-General of Turkestan. He also was chieftain of the Semirechye Cossack Host. He was promoted to General of Artillery in 1910, and from 1911 to 1912 was acting ataman of the Don Cossacks. With the start of World War I, Mischchenko was appointed commander of the 2nd Caucasian Army Corps, and from 1915, the Russian 31st Army Corps on the Southwestern Front.

However, after the February Revolution, he was dismissed from his posts by the new Russian Provisional Government as part of a purge by the new government of known pro-monarchists, and retired from military service. He returned to his hometown of Temir-Khan-Shura, where he continued to wear his uniform and insignia. After the October Revolution, local Bolshevik authorities demanded that he surrender his decorations and epaulets, and when he resisted, he was manhandled and either committed suicide or murdered by the Bolsheviks at his home.

== Honors ==
- Order of St. Anne 3rd degree with sword and bow, 1873
- Order of St Vladimir, 4th degree with sword and bow, 1881
- Order of St Stanislaus, 2nd degree, 1887
- Order of St. Anne 2nd degree, 1893
- Order of St. George, 4th class, 1901
- Order of St Vladimir, 3rd degree, 1901
- Order of St Stanislaus, 1st degree, 1904
- Golden Sword of St. George, 1905
- Order of St. Anne 1st degree with sword and bow, 1905
- Order of St Vladimir, 2nd degree, 1908
- , Order of the White Eagle (Russia), with swords, 1911, 1915 with swords
- , Order of St. Alexander Nevsky, with swords, 1914
