= Battle of Te-li-Ssu =

1904 battle of Russo-Japanese war

Coordinates: 39°46′N 122°02′E

Battle of Telissu
- Part of the Russo-Japanese War
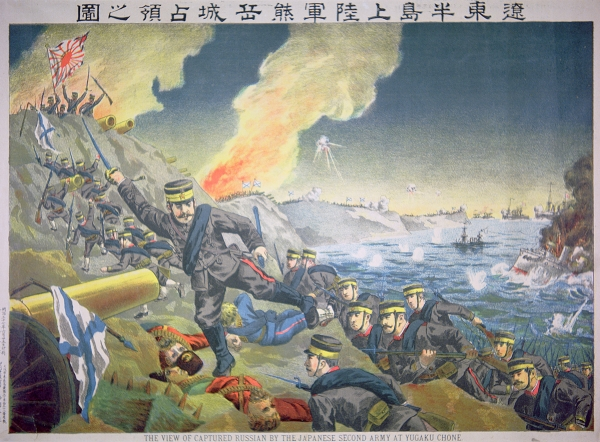
- Japanese lithograph of troops landing under fire on the Liaodong Peninsula
Date	14–15 June 1904
Location	North of Port Arthur, Manchuria (Today, Delisi Wafangdian)
Result	Japanese victory

Belligerents
Japan	Russia

Commanders and leaders
Oku Yasukata	Georg von Stackelberg; Pavel Mishchenko; Aleksandr Gerngross

Strength
33,600–40,000	30,000–41,400

Casualties and losses
217 killed 946 wounded	2,000–5,000 killed and wounded 665 missing

The Battle of Te-li-ssu (得利寺の戦い Tokuriji no tatakai), also called Battle of Wafangou (Russian: Бой у Вафангоу) after the nearby railway station, was a land battle of the Russo-Japanese War. The battle was fought on 14–15 June 1904 between the Japanese Second Army under General Oku Yasukata and the Russian First Siberian Army Corps under Lieutenant General Georgii Stackelberg, at a hamlet some 80 mi (130 km) north of Port Arthur, Manchuria. The battle resulted in a Japanese victory.

The hamlet is known today as Délì-sì, and is located just north of Wafangdian, Liaoning Province, China.

== Background ==
After the loss to the Japanese at the Battle of Nanshan, the Russian Viceroy Yevgeni Alekseyev came under extreme political pressure to make a military advance to prevent the complete encirclement of Port Arthur. The Commander-in-Chief of the Imperial Russian Army in Manchuria, General Alexei Kuropatkin, disagreed vehemently to this plan, which he felt to be both foolhardy and dangerous, and he preferred to wait in Mukden for the Trans-Siberian Railway to bring him the reinforcements he felt necessary for an offensive. The matter came to head on 27 May 1904, when Viceroy Alexeiev summoned General Kuropatkin to a conference in Mukden. The two men wound up shouting at each other, and the matter was referred to St. Petersburg for a decision. The Tsar decided in favor of the Viceroy, and General Kuropatkin was reluctantly forced to mount an offensive from Liaoyang in the general direction of Port Arthur, but it is clear that he had no expectation of reaching that port. Lieutenant-General Georgii Stackelberg commanding 27,000 infantry, 2,500 cavalry (under the command of Lieutenant General Simonov) and 98 guns in the First Siberian Corps, was chosen for the mission. They were later supplemented by 3,000 riflemen and two guns, which arrived just as the frontline troops were withdrawing.

After the Battle of Nanshan, Japanese General Oku Yasukata, commander of the Japanese Second Army, occupied and repaired the piers at Dalny, which had been abandoned almost intact by the fleeing Russians. On 5 May, General Baron Nogi Maresuke arrived at Dalny to assume command of the new Japanese Third Army, consisting of the 1st and 11th Divisions. General Oku's Second army was restructured into the 3rd, 4th and 5th Divisions and an under strength 6th Division, with a total strength of 36,000 infantry, 2,000 cavalry and 216 artillery pieces. Leaving the 3rd Army to lay siege to Port Arthur, and having reports of the southern movement of Russian forces confirmed by cavalry scouts, Oku started his army north on 13 June, following the line of the railway south of Liaoyang.

A week before the engagement, Kuropatkin sent Stackelberg southwards with orders to recapture Nanshan and advance on Port Arthur, but to avoid any decisive action against superior forces. The Japanese army had been moving slowly north since 30 May. Both sides continued to build up their forces and used infantry skirmishes and artillery exchanges to test each other's strength. The Russians, believing the Japanese Second Army's objective to be the capture of Port Arthur, moved their command facilities to Telissu. Stackelberg entrenched his forces, positioning his troops astride the railway to the south of the town, while Lieutenant General Simonov, commanding the 19th Cavalry Squadron, took the extreme right of the front. Oku intended to attack frontally with the 3rd and 5th Divisions, one on each side of the railway, while the 4th division was to advance on the Russian right flank down the Fuchou valley. Being the superior force and having the definite purpose of fighting his way north, Oku began to move on the morning of 14 June.

== The battle ==
On 14 June, Oku advanced his forces northward toward the entrenched Russian positions near the village of Telissu. Stackelberg had reasonable prospects for victory that day. The Russians had possession of the high ground and field artillery. However, rather than cooperating with the defenders by charging straight up the valley into the Russian defenses, Oku advanced the 3rd and 5th Divisions along the center as a feint, while maneuvering the 4th Division rapidly to the west in order to envelop the Russian right flank. Although Russian outposts detected this move, misty weather prevented them from using their heliographs to warn Stakelberg in time.

The battle began with an artillery engagement, which demonstrated the superiority of the Japanese guns not only in number but also in accuracy. The new Russian Putilov M-1903 field gun was first introduced in this battle, but it was ineffective due to lack of training of the crews and the outdated conceptions of the senior artillery officers. The better Japanese artillery seem to have had a significant effect throughout the battle.

As the Japanese divisions in the center commenced skirmishing, Stackelberg judged that the enemy threat would come against his left flank, rather than his right flank, and thus committed his main reserve in that direction. It was a costly mistake.

Skirmishing continued until late night, and Oku decided to launch his main assault at dawn. Likewise, Stackelberg had also determined that the morning of 15 June was the time for his own decisive counter-stroke. Incredibly, Stackelberg issued only verbal orders to his field commanders and left the actual time of the attack vague. Individual commanders, not knowing when to launch the attack, and without any written orders, did not take action until around 07:00. As only about a third of the First East Siberian Rifle Division under Lieutenant General Aleksandr Gerngross committed to the attack, it surprised the Japanese 3rd Division but did not prevail, and soon collapsed in failure. Before long Stackelberg received panicked reports of a strong Japanese attack on his exposed right flank. To avoid envelopment, the Russians began to fall back, abandoning their precious artillery as Oku's 4th and 5th Divisions pressed their advantage. Stakelberg issued the order to retreat at 11:30, but fierce fighting continued through 14:00. Russian reinforcements arrived by train just as the Japanese artillery was targeting the train station. By 15:00, Stackelberg was facing a major defeat, but a sudden torrential rainstorm slowed the Japanese advance and enabled him to extricate his beleaguered forces towards Mukden.

The only Russian offensive to relieve Port Arthur thus came to a disastrous end for Russia.

== Result ==
Total Russian casualties totaled around at least 3,500 (477 killed, 2,240 wounded, and 754 missing), although some estimates give figures as high as 10,000; 3,500 per official records. Japanese casualties totaled only 1,163 (217 killed and 946 wounded). The danger of any attack by General Kuropatkin's forces having been removed by the victory at Telissu, the Japanese advance against Port Arthur began in earnest.

On the same day as the Battle of Telissu, Russian cruisers based at Vladivostok sank two Japanese troop transports off the coast of Japan, killing over 2,000 men and costing the Japanese several batteries of siege guns that were badly needed for the stalled Siege of Port Arthur.
