= Battle of Hsimucheng =

Part of the Russo-Japanese War (1904)

Coordinates: 40.70°N 122.909°E

- Part of the Russo-Japanese War
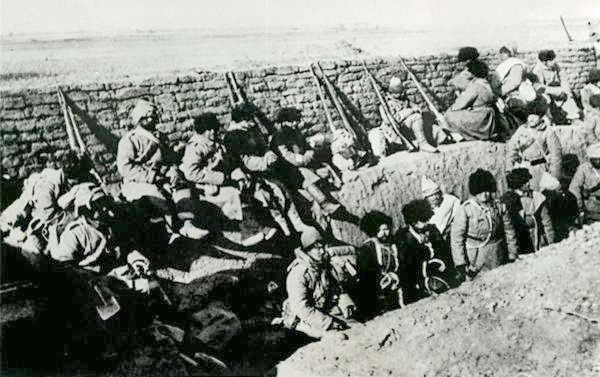
- Russo-Japanese War
Date	31 July 1904
Location	Between Liaoyang and Port Arthur, Manchuria (near present-day Haicheng, Liaoning)
Result	Japanese victory

Belligerents
Empire of Japan	Russian Empire

Commanders and leaders
Nozu Michitsura	Mikhail Zasulich

Strength
34,000	33,000

Casualties and losses
836	1,217

The Battle of Hsimucheng (Japanese: 析木城の戦い, romanized: Sekijō-no-tatakai; Russian: Бой у Симучена) was a minor land engagement of the Russo-Japanese War. It was fought on 31 July 1904 near Hsimucheng, a hamlet in today's Ximu Town (析木镇) about 20 kilometres (12 mi) southeast of the strategic junction town of Haicheng, on the main road connecting Haicheng with the coast between elements of the Imperial Japanese Army and the Imperial Russian Army.

== Background ==
The Japanese 5th and 10th Divisions under the command of General Nozu Michitsura's 4th Army as well as a detachment from the 2nd Army were advancing north towards Liaoyang. This advance was opposed by the Imperial Russian Second Siberian Army Corps under the command of Lieutenant General Mikhail Zasulich, supported by cavalry units under the command of Lieutenant General Pavel Mishchenko.

== Prelude ==
Following its defeat at the Battle of Tashihchiao, the 2nd Siberian Corps under General Zasulich retreated to the village of Hsimungcheng. General Zasulich had a total of 33 battalions and 80 artillery pieces, but was in an exposed position in mountainous terrain.

The two forces collided at 02:00 on 31 July 1904, with the Japanese 10th Division and a reserve brigade making a direct frontal assault on the Russian positions, and the Japanese 5th Division flanking left to threaten the Russian line of retreat.

== Description of battle ==
The Russian forces held out tenaciously through the day and into the night against superior forces. The Japanese 5th Division joined forces with a detachment of the 3rd Division of the 2nd Army sent by General Oku Yasukata to assist, and the Japanese were thus in a position to encircle the Russian force. At 23:00 on 31 July 1904, General Zasulich exercised his standing order from General Alexei Kuropatkin to withdraw to Haicheng, and the Japanese forces were thus able to link up for the next push north towards Liaoyang.

== Aftermath ==
The Battle of Hsimucheng cost the Russian forces 1,217 casualties, and the Japanese forces 836.
