= Russo-Japanese War Medal =

Campaign medal of the Russian Empire

Medal "In Memory of the Russo-Japanese War"
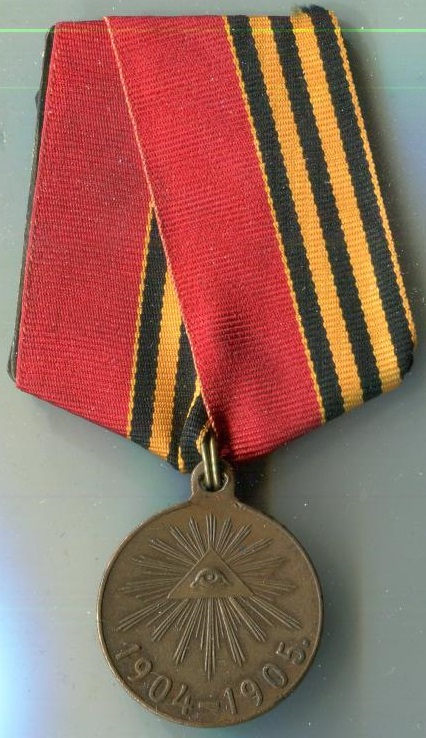
- Obverse of the medal
- Type: Campaign medal
- Country: Russian Empire
- Campaign: Russo-Japanese War
- Established: 21 January 1906
- Ribbon of the medal

The Russo-Japanese War Medal or Medal "In Memory of the Russo-Japanese War" (Russian: медаль «В память русско-японской войны») was a campaign medal issued by the Russian Empire to those who had fought in the Russo-Japanese War and to nurses, medics, priest and other civilians who had distinguished themselves during combat operations. It was established on 21 January 1906 by Nicholas II of Russia and was awarded in silver, bronze and copper.

== Sources ==
- (in Russian) http://medalirus.ru/stati/lozovskiy-medal-russko-yaponskoy-voyny.php#_ftnref5
