= Raid on Yingkou =

Event during the Russo-Japanese war

- Part of the Russo-Japanese War
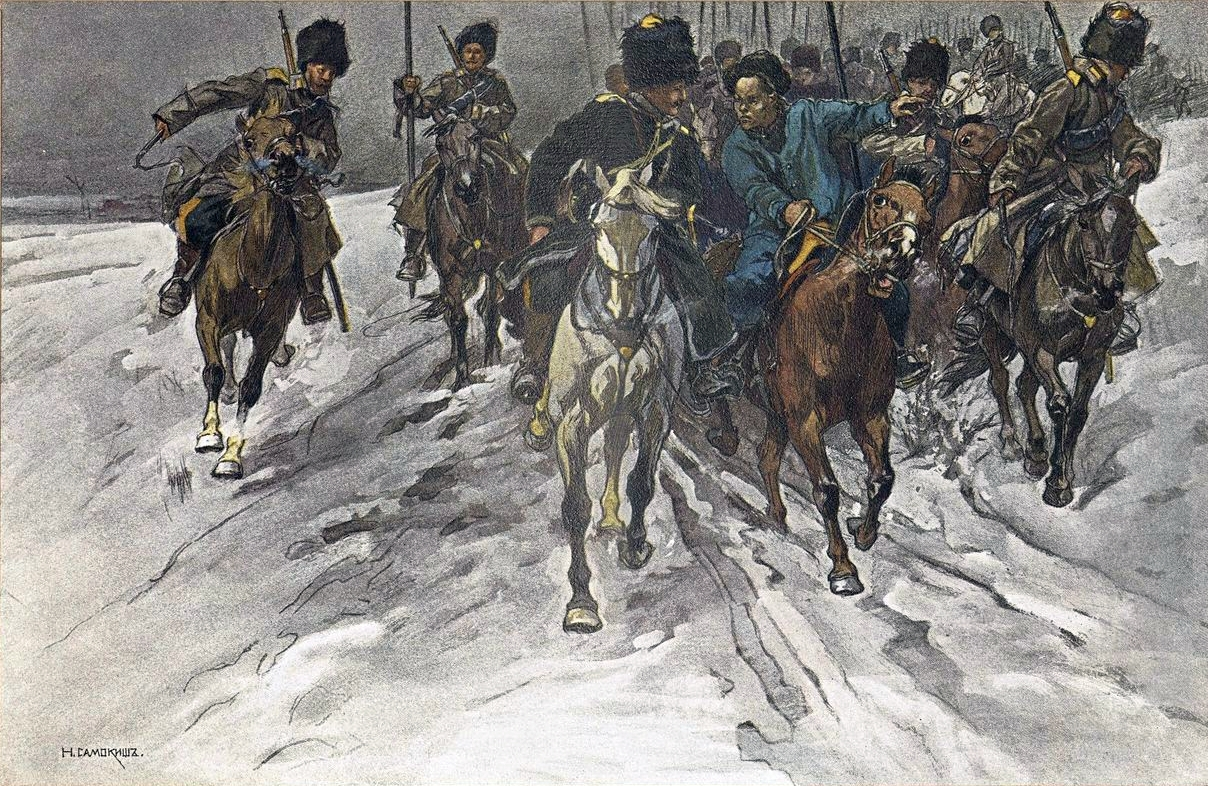
- Mishchenko's raid on Yingkou
Date	January 1905
Location	Manchuria, (modern day China)
Result	Japanese victory

Belligerents
Russia	Japan

Commanders and leaders
Pavel Mishchenko	Unknown

Strength
8,000 men and 34 guns	Unknown

Casualties and losses
39 officers and 331 men killed	1 officer and 14 men captured

The Raid on Yingkou (Note: Russian: Набег на Инкоу) was a military raid performed by Russian cavalry during the Russo-Japanese War in January 1905.

== Background ==
With the surrender of Port Arthur, the course of the war radically changed as the Japanese no longer had to fight on 2 fronts. The armies of Nogi Maresuke and Ōyama Iwao planned on joining up and on further invading Manchuria. In response, the Russian command, led by Pavel Mishchenko, developed a planned raid to prevent the joining of Japanese troops.

== Raid ==
On the 9th of January 1905, Cossacks led by Mishchenko were split into 3 columns to raid the left flank of the Japanese position. Six patrols from the left column were allocated to destroy the railroad, but most of the forces were allocated rushing to the warehouses. On the twelfth of January Colonel Khoranov launched another offensive to prevent the transfer of Japanese reinforcements. This offensive would reach to the coast where the artillery would shell the city. Ultimately, with more Japanese reinforcements coming, the Russian forces retreated after considerable losses.

== Aftermath ==
Although due to the lack of secrecy of the operation the progress was very slow. Russian forces were able to destroy the large warehouses in Yingkou whilst taking minimal casualties. From a morale standpoint, the raid was an absolute victory for Russia, both raising the morale of the Russian troops but also making the Japanese worry about future raids.
