= Konstantin Fedorovich von Schultz =

Russian naval captain (1864–1904)

Konstantin Fedorovich von Schultz Константин Фёдорович Шульц
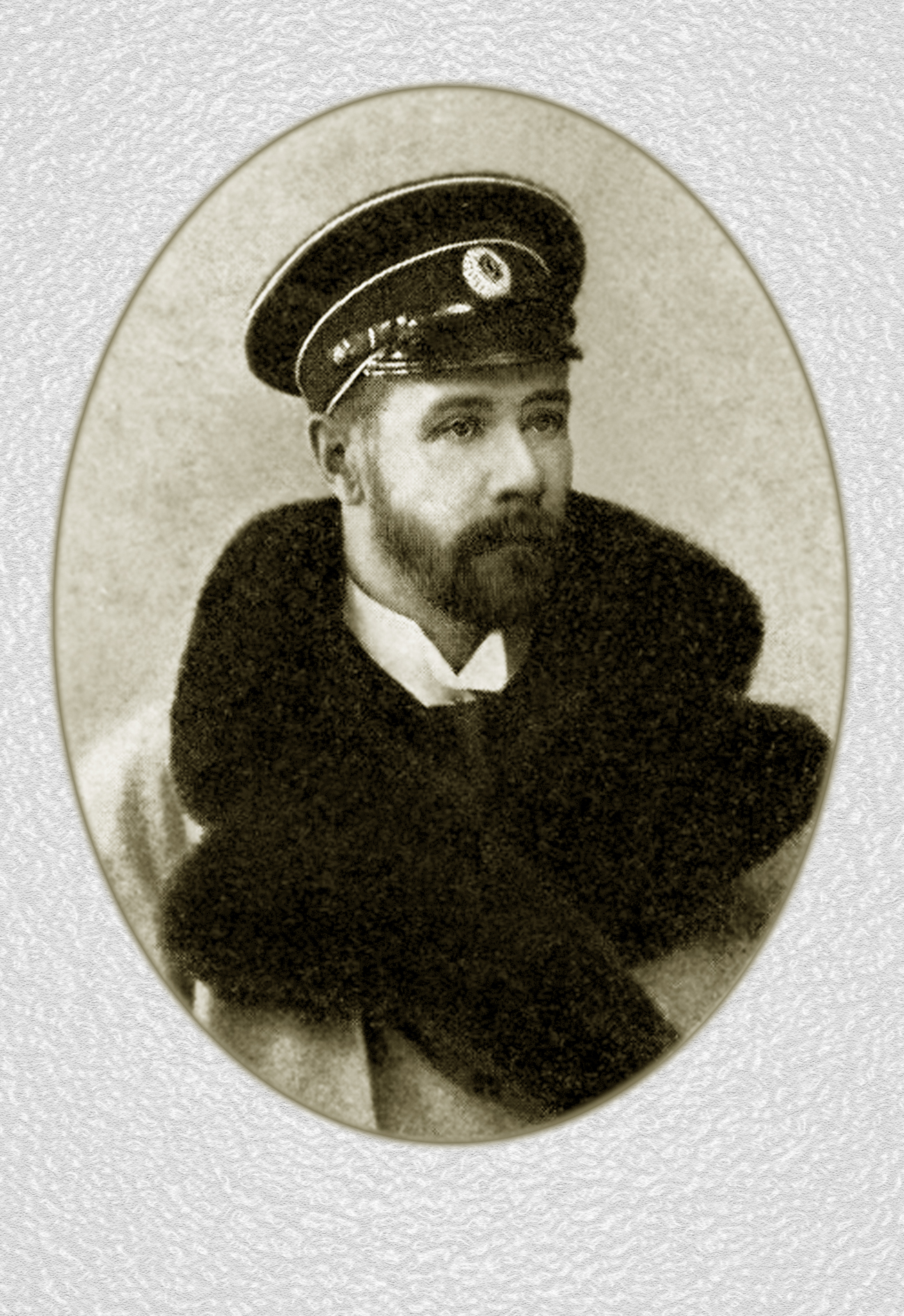
- Konstantin in 1900
- Born: November 12, 1864; Kronstadt, Petergofsky Uyezd, Saint Petersburg Governorate, Russian Empire
- Died: April 13, 1904 (aged 39); Port Arthur, Liaoning, China
- Spouse: Antonina Evgenievna von Schultz
- Military career
- Allegiance: Russian Empire
- Branch: Imperial Russian Navy
- Service years: 1880 – 1904
- Rank: Captain 2nd Rank
- Commands: Russian gunboat Opyt
- Conflicts: Russo-Japanese War †
- Other work: Photographer

Konstantin Fedorovich von Schultz (Russian: Константи́н Фёдорович фон Шульц; 12 November 1864 – 13 April 1904) was a Russian naval captain, known for his service in the Russo-Japanese War and his invention of the "Schultz Trawl" minesweeper.

A close assistant of vice-admiral Stepan Makarov throughout the war, von Schultz sailed with him on the first two voyages of the Yermak, and perished alongside him on the Russian battleship Petropavlovsk when it was sunk by Japanese mines.

== Early life ==
Born in Kronstadt, Konstantin was the third son and sixth of seven children in the family of naval officer Fyodor Bogdanovich von Schultz and his wife Emilia ur. von Voigt (16 January 1832 - 5 May 1889). Upon Fyodor's transfer to St. Petersburg, the family settled in house 36 on Sergievskaya Street, where Konstantin studied at the Annenschule.

After graduating the Annenschule, von Schultz followed the example of his older brothers by enrolling in the Naval Cadet Corps, which he entered on September 16, 1881. His class there included Aleksey Krylov, S. P. Veselago, A. K. Myakishev, and Ludwig Kerber, the last of whom became a close friend of von Schultz.

While von Schultz did not excel academically, he attracted attention with displays of skill on training voyages; Krylov's memoirs recount an incident during an artillery salute in honor of the Practical Squadron of Alexander III, in which von Schultz prevented a live shot from being accidentally fired in the direction of the emperor's yacht. On October 1, 1884, von Schultz graduated with the rank of midshipman.

== Circumnavigation on the Vityaz ==
In 1885, Stepan Makarov recruited a crew of young initiative officers for a planned circumnavigation on the Vityaz. As commander of the Practical Squadron of the Baltic Sea, Makarov led pupils at the Naval School on training voyages, and knew many of them personally. Having received carte blanche from the maritime department, he selected eight midshipmen from the last two graduating classes, among them von Schultz.

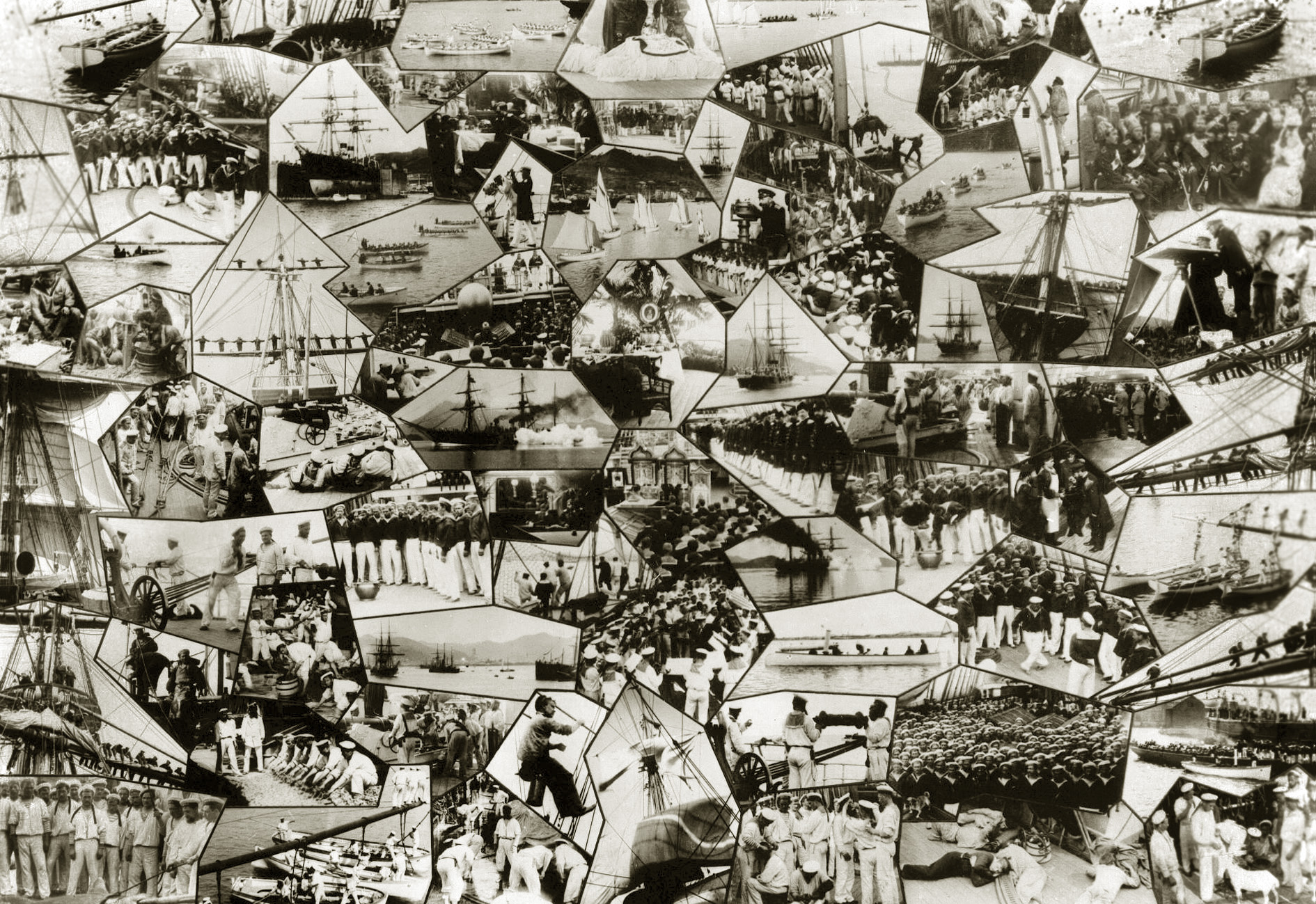
A collage of photos taken by von Schultz during his voyage on the Vityaz.

The Vityaz set sail on August 31, 1886. Makarov's plan was to undertake hydrographic and hydrological studies throughout the Russian waters of the Far East, in the hope of finding convenient locations for fleet bases. The officers of the crew carried out these studies in the Baltic Sea, Sea of Japan, and Atlantic and Pacific Oceans, taking some measurements as often as every quarter hour around the clock. In addition to his other duties, von Schultz acted as chief photographer for the voyage. Cabin boy N. V. Jenish wrote:

The name of the officer who took photographs on the ship has completely disappeared from my memory, although I remember his appearance well. He produced great shots with his large, double-stretch bellows and intricate leg system. I remember well how he and his assistants-sailors performed balancing act in the spars, on the top, saling or bowsprit on the move of the vessel under sail, sometimes with significant excitement and scope of the vessel. Makarov was very interested in this work on the move and then personally controlled the ship, either on the front bridge or on the half-deck, exchanging hand signals or voice with a megaphone with the photographer.

The expedition found some suitable locations in the process of mapping Peter the Great Gulf in the Sea of Japan. A cape there, in Posyet Bay, was named Cape Schultz in honor of von Schultz. (Note: Not to be confused with a different Cape Schultz named in 1863 for his father, Fyodor Bogdanovich.) Afterwards, Makarov published The Vityaz and the Pacific Ocean, an account of the voyage.

== Service in the Far East ==
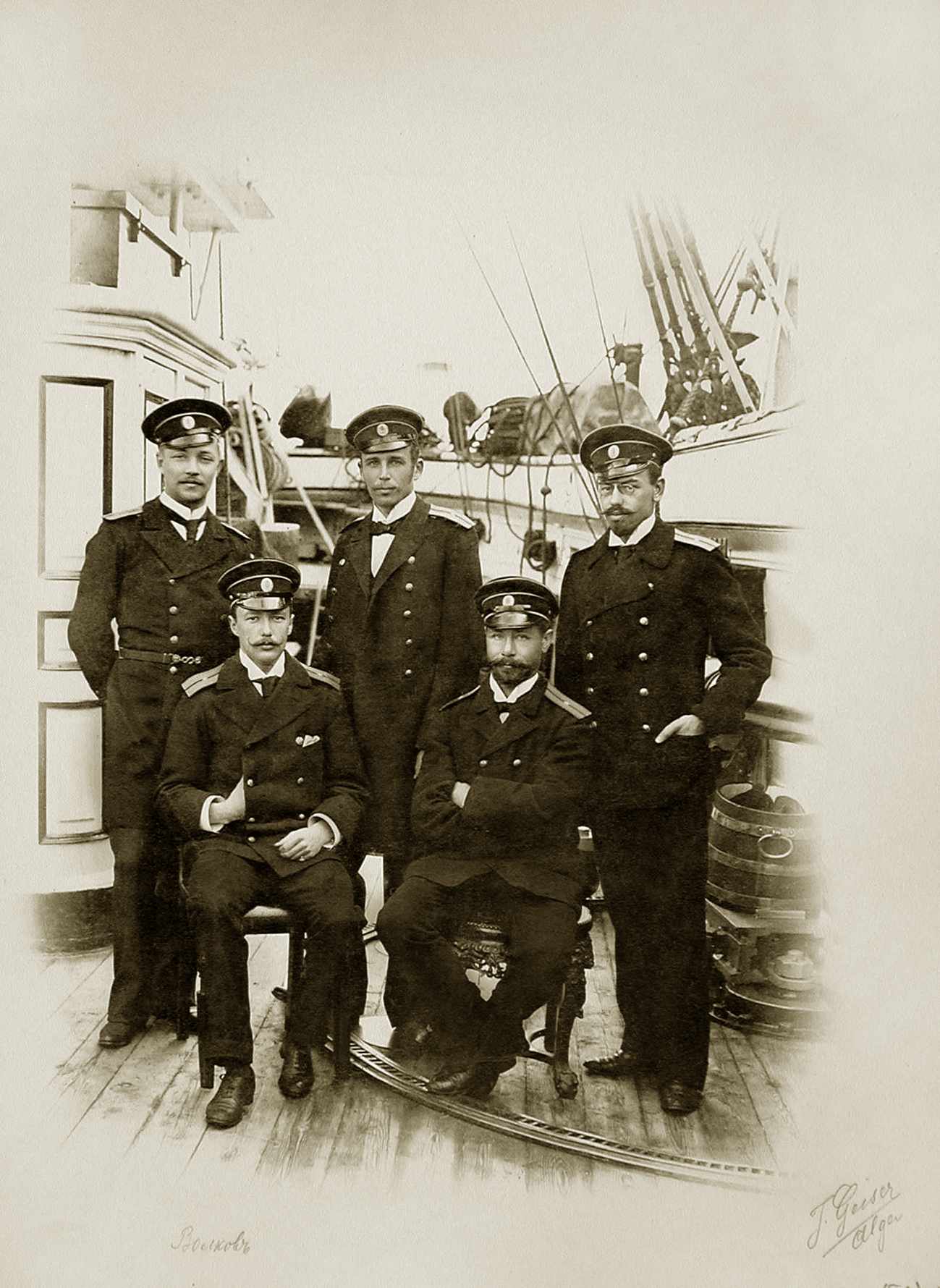
Konstantin Schultz (right) on the Rogue with Nikolai Volkov (left) in 1893.

After the voyage of the Vityaz, Makarov, who believed that mines would be key to future naval wars, assigned the most distinguished of his midshipmen to study in the Naval Mine Classes. On September 1, 1889, von Schultz began his studies in these classes; on September 7, 1890, he graduated as a second class mine officer.

After graduation, von Schultz spent the summer and fall of 1891 in command of the destroyer No. 68, testing Whitehead self-propelled mines along the Gulf of Finland; that winter, he taught at the Kronstadt Mining School. In the spring of 1892, von Schultz was appointed a mine officer on the Russian cruiser Rogue under the command of Pavel Ukhtomsky, and on August 30 he was promoted to lieutenant. On October 1, the cruiser left its navigation training exercises in the Baltic Sea, and departed for the Far East as part of the Pacific Squadron.

In June 1893, the Vityaz ran aground in the Sea of Japan, near Port Lazarev. Aboard the Rogue, von Schultz spent the next month involved in the rescue operation, which ultimately proved unsuccessful. On November 20, he was promoted to first class mine officer.

A year later, due to the First Sino-Japanese War, Makarov arrived to join the Pacific Squadron with a small unit. In January 1895, Makarov temporarily transferred von Schultz as a senior mine officer to the cruiser Admiral Kornilov, instructing him to investigate the effect of Japanese shells on the armor of the Chinese ironclad Dingyuan in Port Arthur. Makarov used the results of von Schultz's investigation to develop the tactics of the squadron during the Russo-Japanese War.

In July 1895, von Schultz returned to the Rogue and, in May 1896, he returned to Kronstadt. Makarov, who had returned some time earlier, had von Schultz appointed to his headquarters aboard the Petr Veliky as flagship mine officer. On Makarov's instructions, von Schultz worked to develop combat tactics for destroyers operating as part of a squadron, rather than independently as had been the existing practice.

== Schultz and Makarov on the icebreaker "Yermak" ==
At that time, Makarov was interested in developing the Northern Sea Route as a shorter, independent route to the Far East, an idea which required heavy ocean icebreakers to be feasible. Together with his protégés Mikhail Vasiliev von Schultz and Mikhail Fedorovich von Schultz, Makarov developed a detailed technical plan for the first domestic ocean-going icebreaker.

In the summer of 1897, together with von Schultz, Makarov undertook a reconnaissance voyage on the steamer Ioann Kronstadt. They sailed from the port of Vardø in Sweden-Norway, through the Barents and Kara Seas, to the Yenisei river. Upon their return to St. Petersburg, Makarov obtained official government approval for his planned ship. Work on the Yermak began under Makarov's supervision in November 1897, at the U.K. shipyard of Armstrong Whitworth at Newcastle upon Tyne.

That same year, Schultz developed and tested a new model of naval trawler for use in minesweeping, which became known as the "Schultz trawl". A system of buoys, braces, and lead weights kept the minesweeper at a given depth, so that it neither floated up during towing nor came into contact with the ocean floor during trawling. This design reduced breakage, increased trawling speed, and made it possible to tow a mine to a shallow place where it could be safely detonated. Russia adopted the Schultz trawl in 1898 and used it in the Russo-Japanese War; afterwards, other fleets adopted the design, and it saw use in both the First and Second World Wars.

The Yermak was completed in early 1899, and on February 21, she left Great Britain for St. Petersburg, with Mikhail Vasiliev von Schultz as commander and Konstantin Fedorovich von Schultz as senior officer. That summer, the Yermak made her first two Arctic trips, with Makarov leading the scientific work of the expeditions. Once again, von Schultz took on the role of photographer, in addition to the ordinary duties of a senior officer. He took up filming, too, in what was the first instance of scientific cinematography in the fleet. Makarov wrote:

To take a cinematic picture, Lieutenant Schultz, who adapted the cinematograph to a tripod from a magnetic device, placed it on the ice at a distance of about four hundred meters from the ship on the beam of the left side of the bow. Light conditions were not particularly favorable. When the cinema was set, the icebreaker moved back half its length, after which there was a given full speed forward ...

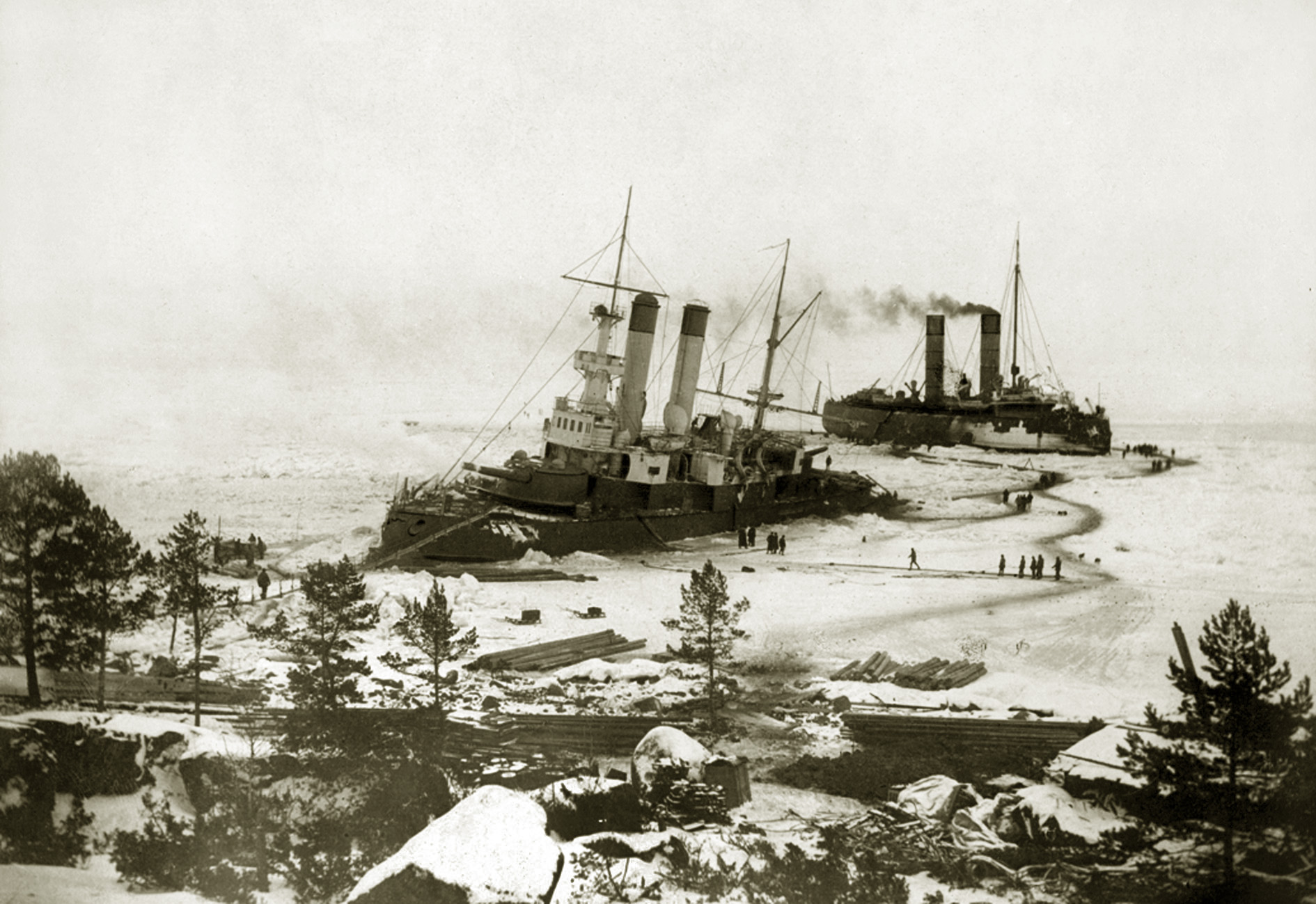
The Yermak rescuing the General-Admiral Apraksin off the island of Gogland. 1899–1900.

Returning from a voyage in the Arctic Ocean in late 1899, the Yermak joined in a multi-month effort to remove the coastal defense battleship General-Admiral Apraksin from the stones of the Gulf of Finland near Gogland. The Yermak worked to constantly break the ice around the battleship, and to ensure the uninterrupted delivery of goods from Reval.

This rescue was particularly notable for involving the first practical radio communication session. Radio stations were established on the island of Gogland and the Finnish Kotka; von Schultz assisted in the preparations, first attempting to raise a radio antenna in a balloon, then installing it on the mast of the Kotka. On 24 January 1900, a message was successfully sent between Alexander Stepanovich Popov on Gogland and Pyotr Rybkin on the Kotka.

These campaigns won the Yermak nationwide fame, and made Makarov and his assistants into national heroes, favored by nobles including Nikolai II himself. In May 1900, during a lecture by Makarov about the Yermak Arctic expedition, von Schultz was awarded royal gratitude for “indicating views with a magic lantern and cinematography” to the Romanov Family. In September 1900, von Schultz, who had earned widespread respect among his colleagues, was elected by an overwhelming majority as a mine specialist to the Technical Commission of Kronstadt.

On May 16, 1901, the Yermak set off on another Arctic voyage, led by the same chief officers. The route ran from the Baltic, through the North, Norwegian, Greenland, and Barents Seas to the northern tip of Novaya Zemlya, then on through the Kara Sea to the mouth of the Yenisei. However, funding was allocated for only one of the two ocean-going icebreakers Makarov requested, and as a result the expedition was unable to break through the densely packed ice at the northern tip of Novaya Zemlya. This would not be achieved until 1916, when the icebreaker Svyatogor was launched in Newcastle.

The Yermak returned to St. Petersburg after the failed expedition, and was taken out of Makarov's control. That fall, von Schultz was reassigned to command the Opyt. There, under the guidance of Alexander Popov, he oversaw the creation of the first ship radio room; in the following year, he extended this project, equipping all the warships of the Baltic Fleet with radio cabins. Similar work took place in parallel on the Pacific squadron in Port Arthur, such that by the beginning of the Russo-Japanese War, the vast majority of Russian warships were equipped with radio communications.

In addition, von Schultz used his gunboat to test a new system for setting counter-mines. He created a novel ignition device to solve the issue of simultaneous detonation of counter-mines without conductors, triggered by the pressure from the explosion of neighboring counter-mines. With this system, counter-mines dropped at intervals of 38 meters could be exploded almost simultaneously. A counter-mine with a charge of 216 kg of wet pyroxylin could destroy the hull of a neighboring mine from up to 60 meters, and 100 counter-mines could reliably clear a passage 0.5 cables wide and two miles long. Like the "Schultz Trawl", the counter-mine system proposed by von Schultz was adopted by the Imperial Russian Navy as early as 1903.

== Russo-Japanese War ==
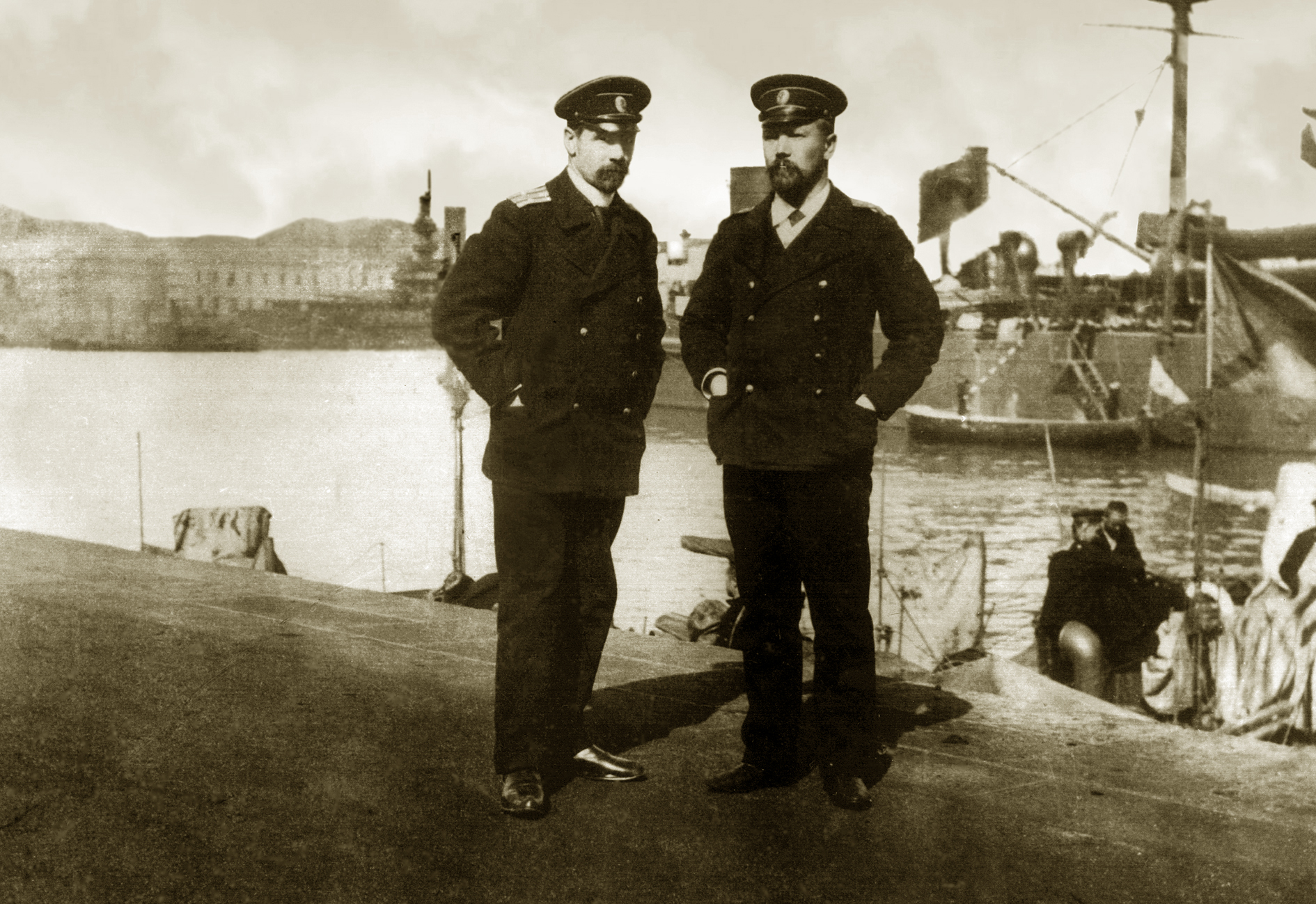
Konstantin von Schultz (left) with his brother Mikhail Fedorovich von Schultz (right) at Port Arthur in front of the Novik in February 1904.

On January 1, 1904, von Schultz was promoted to a captain of the 2nd rank; shortly thereafter, on January 27, the Russo-Japanese War broke out. Makarov was immediately appointed commander of the Pacific Squadron, with Mikhail Vasiliev von Schultz as senior flag officer and Konstantin Fedorovich von Schultz as senior flagship mine officer.

Makarov set out by train for the Far East on February 5. Upon his arrival in Port Arthur on February 24, he entrusted von Schultz with organizing the fleet's mine defense. Within a short time, von Schultz created a detachment of minesweepers, which successfully cleared passages for the squadron to the open sea. Meanwhile, the squadron was equipped with radio communications, radio operators were trained, and procedures for radio communication were organized, with von Schultz drawing attention to the need for secrecy on the air and the potential for locating enemy radio transmitters.

On March 31, 1904, Makarov hastily withdrew his squadron to go to the aid of the Strashnyy. In violation of his own orders, he failed to send the minesweeper squad ahead to clear the fairway. As a result, the flagship of the squadron, the battleship Petropavlovsk, was blown up by a mine and instantly went under water. More than 650 people died, including Makarov, Mikhail Vasiliev von Schultz, and Konstantin Fedorovich von Schultz.

Nine years later, Japanese divers raised the remains of six people from the wreck of the Petropavlovsk. According to one of the two official versions, von Schultz was among the six.

== Awards ==
- Medal of the Reign of Alexander III (1896)
- Medal of the Coronation of Nicholas II (1899)
- Order of Saint Stanislaus:
  - III Class (1899)
  - II Class (1902)
- Order of Saint Anna, III Class (1899)

=== Foreign awards ===
- France: Legion of Honour, Officer (1903)
