= Russian ship Opyt =

More than one Russian naval vessel has borne the name Opyt (Russian: Опыт "Experience"):

- Russian cutter Opyt (1806) was launched in 1806, captured by the British in 1808 in an epic action, renamed HMS Baltic, and then sold in 1810.
- Russian gunboat Opyt (1861) was launched in 1861 and stricken in 1906.

In addition, the Russians commissioned four schooners and one transport/bomb vessel with the name Opyt.
