= Mikhail Fedorovich von Schultz =

Vice admiral of Imperial Russian Navy

Maximilian Fedorovich von Schultz
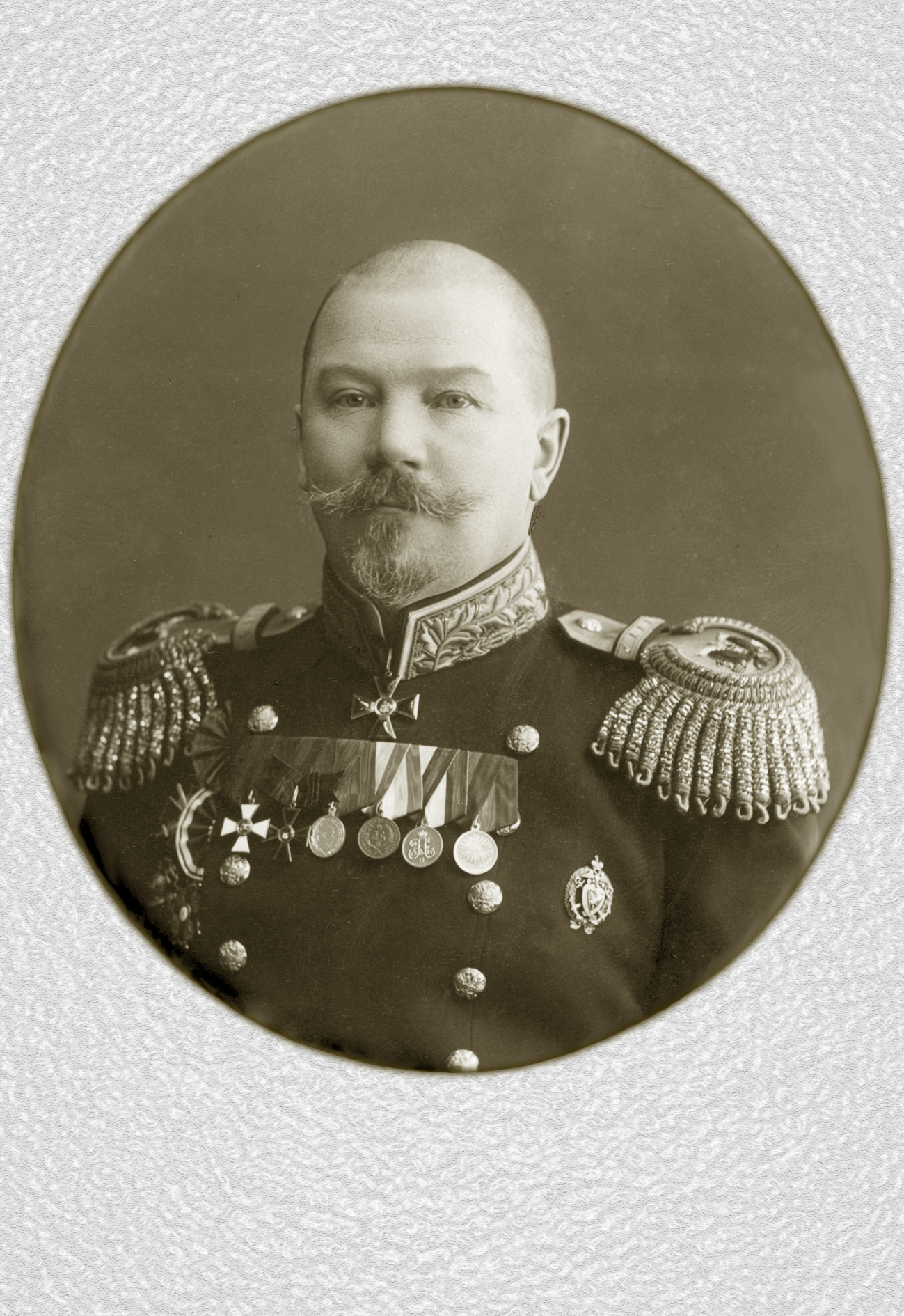
- Born: January 6, 1862; Kronstadt, Saint Petersburg, Russian Empire
- Died: September or October of 1919 (aged 57)
- Military career
- Allegiance: Russian Empire
- Branch: Imperial Russian Navy
- Commands: Brave; Novik; Gromoboi; Komintern; Ioann Zlatoust
- Conflicts: Boxer Rebellion; Russo-Japanese War; Battle of Korsakov; World War I
- Awards: Order of Saint Anna; Order of Saint Stanislaus; Order of Saint Vladimir; Order of St. George; Medal "For Works on the First General Population Census"; Medal "In commemoration of the reign of Emperor Alexander III"; Medal "For a campaign to China"; Russo-Japanese War Medal; Medal "In Commemoration of the 300th Anniversary of the Reign of the House of Romanov"; Medal "In Commemoration of the 200th Anniversary of the Naval Battle of Gangut"; Medal "In Commemoration of the 100th Anniversary of the Patriotic War of 1812"; Order of the Sacred Treasure

Maximilian Herbert Gottlieb Schultz (January 6, 1862 – c. September or October 1919), known professionally as Mikhail Fedorovich was a vice admiral of the Imperial Russian Navy. He was distinguished for his service in the Boxer Rebellion, Russo-Japanese War and World War I.

== Biography ==
Schultz was born January 6, 1862, in Kronstadt, Russia, to naval officer Fyodor Bogdanovich von Schultz and Emilie Henriette von Voigt. After his family moved to St. Petersburg, Schultz studied at Annenschule, graduating September 16, 1875, before entering the Naval Cadet Corps. He was promoted to a midshipman on April 12, 1881, but was transferred to the Separate Corps of the Border Guard in August 29. Schultz served on border cruiser Dive which patrolled the Baltic Sea for smugglers. On May 31, 1882, he was promoted to warrant officer.

On May 21, 1883, Schultz was reassigned as officer of the watch on board the Bayan which sailed to the Pacific Ocean. After his return on August 27, 1885, Schultz was appointed as inspector on board the Smerch, which defended the port of Kronstadt. On December 16, 1886, he was promoted to Mine Officer 2nd Class after attending a short course. He continue to serve on board the Smerch until January 1, 1889, when he was promoted to lieutenant. Beginning May 2 later that year, he became commander 3rd company on board the battleship Petr Veliky.

Until autumn, Schultz was part of the Practical Squadron under Vice Admiral N.V. Kopytov, after which he enrolled into the Kronstadt diving school. He would take a break from diving to study overseas navigation under Captain 1st Rank A. A. Birilyov on board the Minin for almost a year. Schultz then returned to diving school, and by the end of December 1891 was promoted to diving officer. During this period, he designed an underwater mine detector and improved the underwater telephone.

Schultz started teaching diving at the school in 1892, and in 1896 became assistant head before becoming headmaster in 1906, a position he would hold until 1917.

Despite this, Schultz continued to serve on board the Minin. In 1894, he and a group of diving teachers and cadets searched for the monitor Rusalka, but were unsuccessful. The following year, he also took part in the search for the British frigate Prince which sank in 1854 near Balaklava.

October 16, 1895 saw Schultz being sent to Siberia and on March 10, 1896, he was assigned to the destroyer Revel. He also became a member of the temporary naval court at Vladlvostok in around the same time.

Due to personnel shortages at the time, Schultz was constantly reassigned to new ships. A year later, he was appointed captain of the mine transport Aleut and by November 18, was the commander of the 11th company of the Siberian naval crew. April 18 the following year, he became commander of the destroyer Sveaborg and May 30, the commander of the destroyer Borgo. In autumn that year, he was commander of the 3rd company on board the gunboat Manjur and the next year in August 1898, became senior officer for the cruiser Bully. He became 12th company commander in November.

On January 11, 1899, Schultz was transferred from Vladlovstok to Port Arthur, China where he became commander of destroyer detachment No,'s 203, 204, 205, 206, and 207. He became senior officer of the gunboat Beaver, but had to return to the Baltic due to the battleship General-Admiral Apraksin running aground in 1900. He and his younger brother, Konstantin, took part in the rescue of the vessel, with Schultz and another diver A.K. Nebolsinwere carrying out underwater denotations of the rock underneath the ship to free it.

Schultz returned to Port Arthur in spring and on April 27 was appointed senior officer on board the cruiser Robber, the same ship Konstantin had served in before. He participated in the Boxer Rebellion and helped commandeer the paratroopers that stormed the Taku Fortresses and Beijing on board the cruiser Rogue. His time on the Rogue lasted two more years and on April 14, 1902, he was promoted to captain 2nd rank and then a month later commander of the destroyer Piercing. He was meant to return to the Baltic sea, but he was instead tasked in commanding the newly built destroyer Brave in Port Arthur.

=== Russo-Japanese War ===
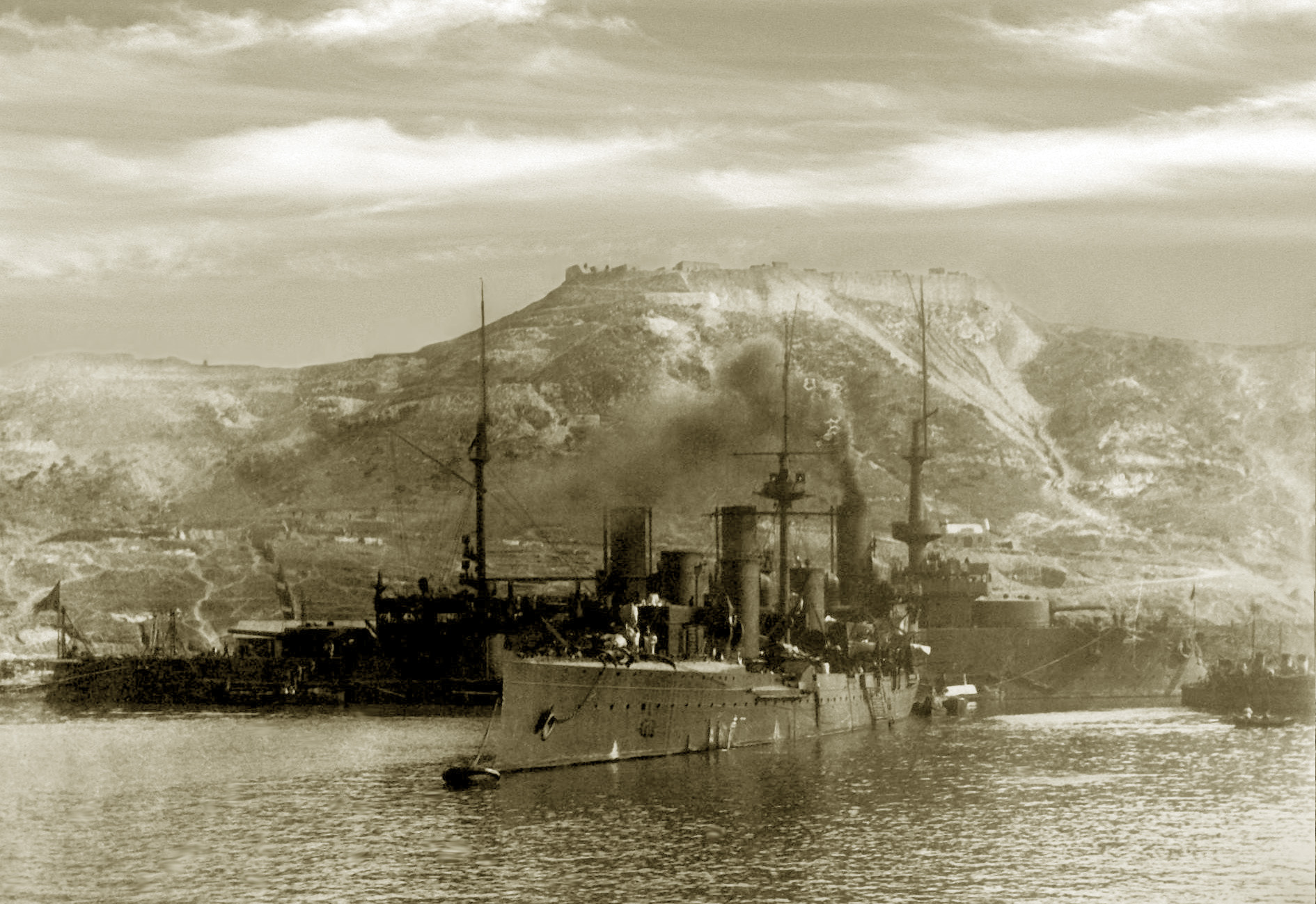
The Novik in warpaint, Eastern Basin of Port Arthur. 1904

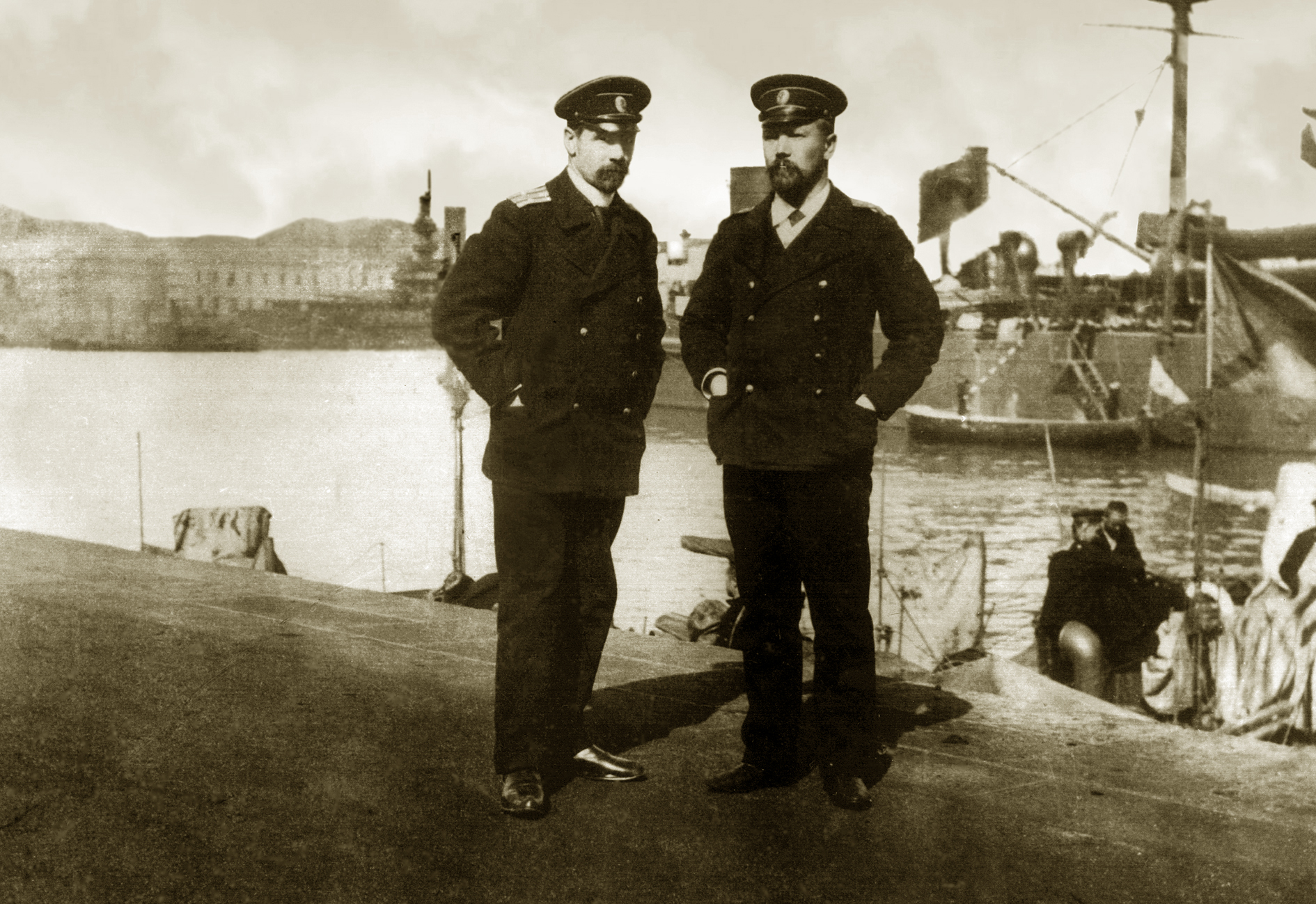
Captain 2nd Rank M. von Schultz (right) with his brother Konstantin von Schultz in Port Arthur in front of the Novik. February 1904.

The Brave and its sister ship the Guarding were tasked in preventing the Japanese from entering Port Arthur after the outbreak of the Russo-Japanese War in 1904.

On February 24, Vice Admiral Stepan Makarov became commander of the Russian Pacific Squadron, who assigned Captain 2nd Rank Schultz as commander of the cruiser Novik on March 16 after transferring Captain 1st Rank N.O Essen to the battleship Sevastopol. Makarov's decision was criticized by Nicholas II and Admiral Yevgeni Ivanovich Alekseyev.

Novik was the only ship constantly in a state of 40-minute readiness at Port Arthur, meaning most of her engines were always kept lit. She would participate in almost all Pacific Squadron operations, often acting alone or led by a detachment of destroyers. The crew on board the Novik were the most decorated at Port Arthur, with Schultz himself being awarded the Golden Weapon for Bravery. Schultz writes in his daily report on board the Novik:

On June 22 of this year, early in the morning, following the verbal orders of the Squadron Commander, together with the ships Thundering, Brave, Beaver, Gilyak, and destroyers of the 1st and 2nd detachments left the basin to shell enemy positions located at altitude 150. Going into the roadstead, I saw four enemy destroyers. Following the usual route, I came to the eastern bay of Longwantan, but due to the fog we could not see the top of the peak, so at 7:10 in the morning we fired blindly, hoping to hit the summit. After the fog cleared, we fired at the summit, trying to destroy the dugout positioned there.

— Mikhail Fedorovich von Schultz

Schultz witnessed the sinking of the battleship Petropavlovsk on April 13, 1904. On board were Makarov and Schultz's brother Konstantin, who both did not survive the sinking.

Soon, the Novik became infamous even among the Japanese, who called her "bewitched". A Tokyo correspondent for the London Times wrote:

More than once the Japanese thanked the stars that they only had to deal with one Novik—otherwise, the history of this war could have looked completely different.

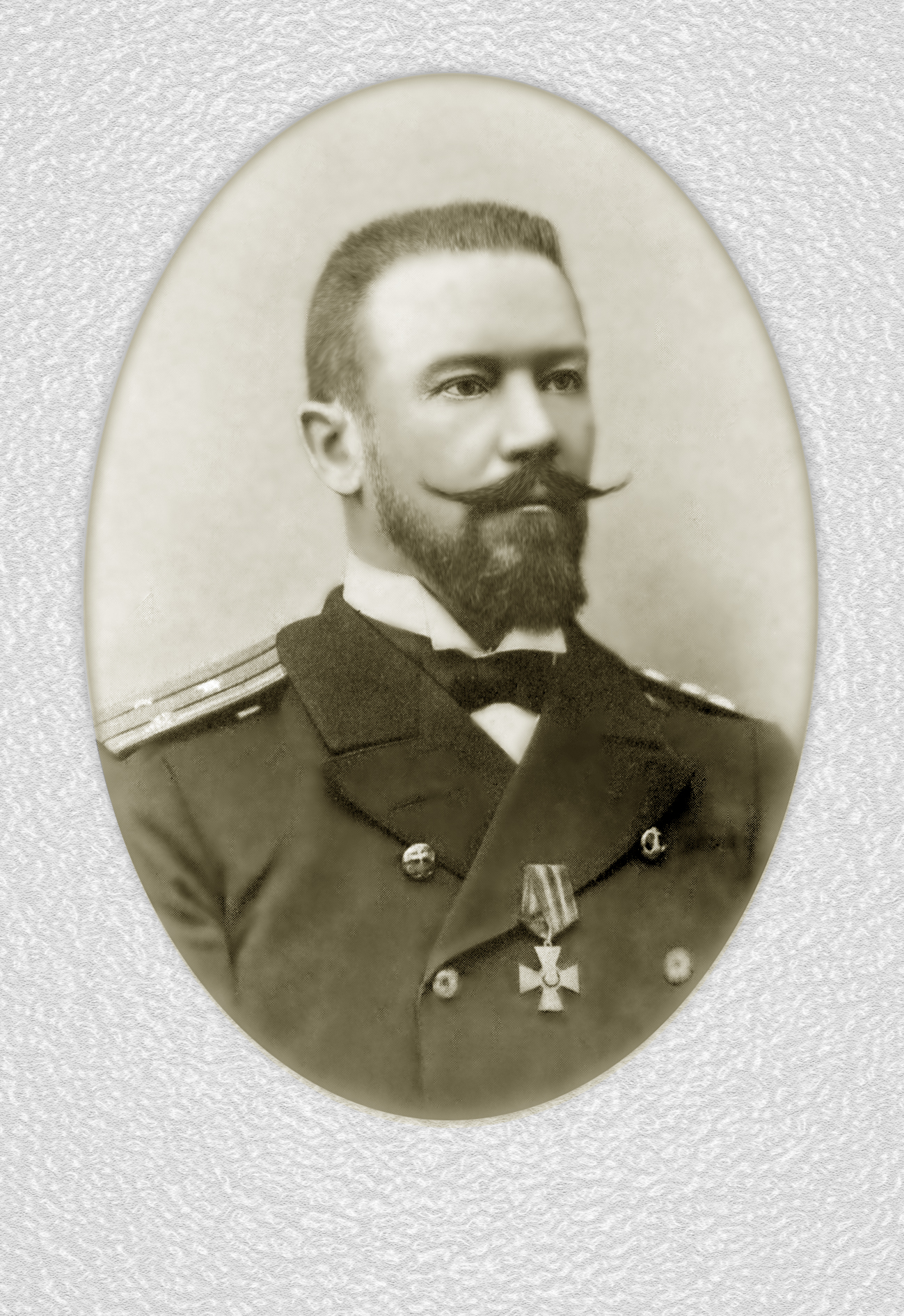
Captain 2nd Rank M.F. von Schultz, 1906

In 1904, in the besieged Port Arthur, Schultz was the only ship commander who organized an agricultural subsidy. A. P. Shter wrote:

Thanks to the prudence of the Novik commander, neither the team nor the officers ever needed provisions. Having received at his disposal the dacha of one of the officers outside the city, Schultz acquired a herd of cows that grazed under the supervision of a shepherd. Some of them even reproduced. We could eat only corned beef while in the open sea, but now we could send fresh veal as a gift to our friends. About 150 chickens supplied us fresh eggs. Pigs, rams, geese, ducks—everything was abundantly stocked. On the Novik herself were two gardeners who had sowed all kinds of greens at the beginning of the siege. By July we had our own potatoes, onions, and other vegetables. At the end of July, while coastal defenders had to slaughter donkeys to survive, the crew on board the Novik received fresh meat daily. More than once you'll remember the kindness of such a caring commander, thanks to whom one of the main burdens of the siege—that being bad food and hunger—were eliminated.

==== Scuttling of the Novik ====
By July 1904, only a few warships had managed to breakthrough Admiral Tōgō Heihachirō's fleet. The Novik, after resupplying in Qingdao, tried to reach Vladivostok but was intercepted by the Japanese cruiser Tsushima at Sakhalin Island. After the Battle of Korsakov, both ships were badly damaged. The Novik was rendered immobile so Schultz had the ship scuttled near Korsakov. Schultz wrote a detailed report about the event.

The sinking of the Novik was a national event in Russia. The journal Chronicle of the War with Japan soon published an article entitled In Memory of Novik which read:

We have had to endure many a sad moment, watching the struggle of our distant squadron against the treacherous enemy. Our gratitude to the Novik for her successes was all the more fervent. From the first days of the war, she proved herself to be a true Russian daredevil. Small, relatively weak, not protected by much armor, she did not hesitate to charge alone at the enemy, covering her wounded sisters and surprising the enemy with her courage.

As Boris Galenin notes:

The Novik became the only participant in the battle on July 28 whose crew were rightfully bestowed awards on November 29, 1904, with the inscription: "For feats of courage and bravery." All other ships involved only were only known after an analysis of the battle by the Investigative Commission in 1906.

Schultz was awarded the Order of St. George 4th class for his actions at the battle.

Arriving in Vladivostok on August 9, 1904, Schultz became acting commander of the Thunderbolt, replacing N. D. Dabicha who was wounded in a battle in the Korea Strait on August 1. Lev Alekseevich Brusilov, Dabicha's replacement, was expected to arrive by December, but did not arrive until April the following year.

Schultz became acquainted with Vladimir Arsenyev and Orel commander A. N. Pell while in Vladivostok. Together, they took part in archaeological research. The Grodekov Museum in Khabarovsk exhibits some artifacts found in autumn 1916 on the peninsula in Amur Bay by the group. Paleolithic stone spearheads, axes and chips were among what they found, with pottery dated from a later period also discovered on the peninsula. After World War II, the peninsula was excavated by Alexey Okladnikov.

Admirals Zinovy Rozhestvensky and Nikolai Nebogatov, due to their involvement in the Battle of Tsushima and Siege of Port Arthur, were court marshaled. Schultz testified against the admirals and defended former Port Arthur commander Konstantin Smirnov. By the time these trials began, Schultz was stationed in the Black Sea and promoted to Captain 1st Rank.

=== 1905–1913 ===
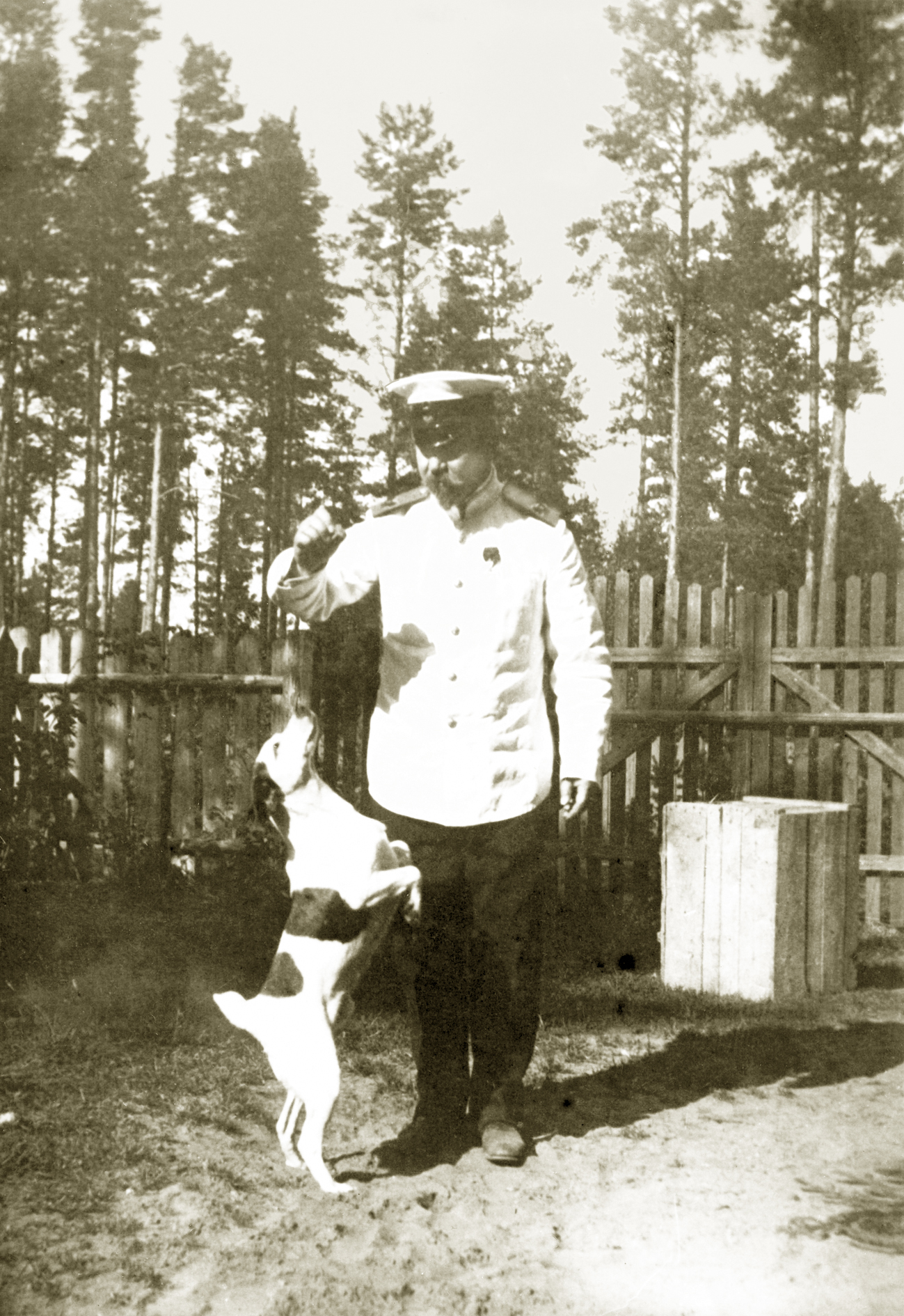
Rear Admiral M.F. von Schultz in Luga, 1913

With the end of the Russo-Japanese war on September 26, 1905, Schultz returned to St. Petersburg. Instead of rejoining the Baltic fleet, on January 30, 1906, he was transferred to the Black Sea Fleet as commander of the Kagul which had just entered service. This was due to the 1905 Russian Revolution which caused an uprising aboard the Ochakov. Schultz departed on the Cahul from Nikolaev to Sevastopol to conduct sea trials. The following year on January 31, it was enlisted to the Separate Practical Detachment of the Black Sea, and on March 25, 1907, was renamed to Pamiat' Merkuria. On April 27, 1907, Schultz became Captain 1st Rank.

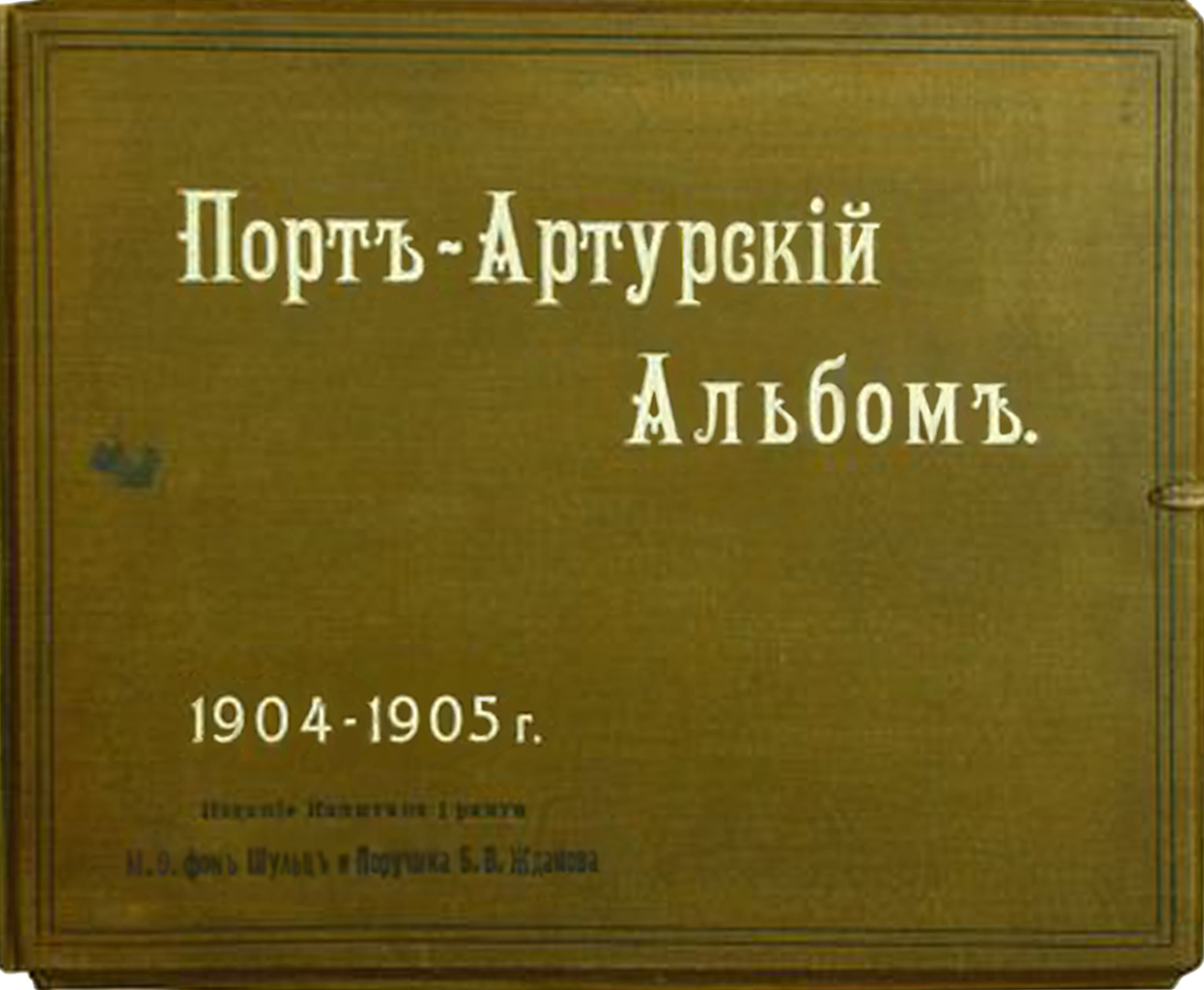
Port Arthur album by M.F.Schultz

Schultz was a photographer and photographed Port Arthur during his time there. After the war was over, collaborating with Lieutenant B. V. Zhdanov and published by Prokundin-Gorsky, he release the photo album titled "Port Arthur Album. 1904-05". He had taken enough photographic plates depicting the conflict to fill a chest. In 1919, in Luga, Leningrad Oblast, while Schultz was being arrested by the Chekists, this chest went missing. In 1951, a large portion of the negatives were accidentally discovered during a house renovation in Vitebsk. They were given to the Central Naval Museum.

While Schultz was posted at the Black Sea, he founded and was elected vice commander of the Sevastopol Yacht Club.

A year later, on March 3, 1908, Schultz was appointed commander of the John Chrysostom. After the leader of the uprising on the Ochakov Pyotr Schmidt was given the death penalty, members of the naval court in Sevastopol, including Schultz who became a member on March 28, 1907, were targets of the Socialist-Revolutionary Party.

N.O. Essen became commander of the Baltic Sea Naval Forces on November 24, 1908. Prior to taking office, he selected Schultz as commander of the minelayer detachment. Because of this, Schultz returned to the Baltic Sea and began laying mines with a training clipper. Only on November 10, 1910, after completing the sea trials of all six minelayers of the detachment, did Schultz officially become commander of the group.

In the three years of commanding the minelayers, Schultz made it one of the most efficient formations in the fleet. Twice, on June 29, 1910, and March 21, 1911, Nicholas II went to see it in-action. Schultz was award the Highest gratitude and became a rear admiral on December 6, 1911. It was this force who, under the command of Rear Admiral V.A. Kanin, a few hours before the start of World War I, set mines along the Gran Porkkala Udd, effectively blocking entry into the Gulf of Finland and thus kept the port city of St. Petersburg (renamed Petrograd in 1914) secure.

On April 3, 1913, leaving the minelayers detachment, Schultz took command of a brigade of cruisers consisting of the Thunderbolt, Admiral Makarov, Pallada, and the second incarnation of the Novik. He spent only one campaign with this brigade before being appointed the commander of the Siberian military flotilla.

=== World War I ===
In the outbreak of World War I, the Siberian Military Flotilla consisted the cruisers Askold and Zhemchug, the gunboat Manjur, ten destroyers, and nine submarines. Schultz led an Arctic expedition under the command of B.A. Vilkitsky. Two icebreakers, the Taimyr and the Vaygach, managed to pass the Northern Sea Route and reach Arkhangelsk.

The modest Siberian Flotilla joined a British fleet in a battle against Vice Admiral M. von Spee. In order to bolster the fleet, various civilian ships were converted into warships. A small detachment commanded by Schultz escorted cargo ships from the United States to Vladivostok. Only once were the Germans successful in apprehending one of Schultz's ships, the Ryazan by the Emden in the early days of the war.

With the creation of the Arctic Ocean Flotilla, Schultz transferred a number of his own ships to the fleet, in-addition to transferring three former Russian warships, the Poltava, the Peresvet and the Varyag, after they were purchased from Japan.

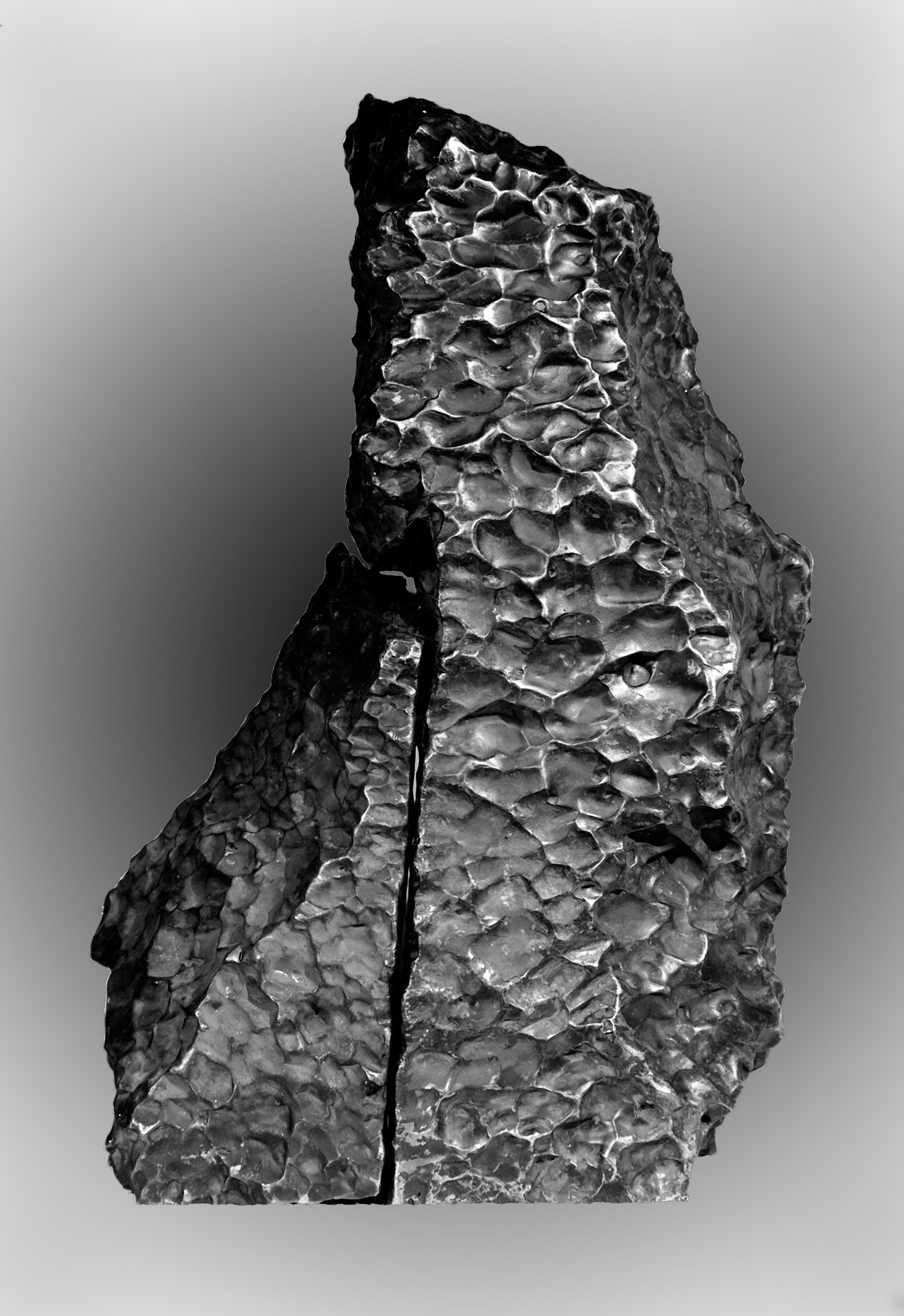
The meteorite Boguslavka

On October 18, 1916, residents of Primorye reported a meteorite that fell during the day. It fell 180 kilometers north of Vladivostok, near the settlement of Boguslavka. Schultz helped organize the search team and two large fragments of the meteorite with the combined weight of 256.8 kg were recovered. Schultz transported the fragments to Petrograd. The meteorite fragments, named Boguslavka, are now stored in the Meteorite collection of the Russian Academy of Sciences under his name. This iron meteorite was among the first found in Russia and Schultz became a member of the Board of Honor of the Meteorite Collection of the Russian Academy of Sciences.

=== Death ===
After the February Revolution, Schultz refused to swear allegiance to the Russian Provisional Government. He returned to Petrograd on April 4, 1917, and according to his nephew Boris Lvovich Kerber, he was guarded by reserved Siberian Flotilla crew while at the military camp where revolutionary and Germanophobic sentiments had brewed.

When the Bolsheviks came to power, Schultz did not take part in the Russian Civil War, instead living in the suburbs of Petrograd. Never marrying, he settled with his sister in Luga. In summer 1919, Nikolai Yudenich's army approached Luga. Schultz participated in a secret meeting with his former crew members and Schultz confirmed he would not take part in the war. It was likely this meeting became known to the Communists as soon he was arrested and shot by the Chekists in late September or early October 1919. His burial spot was never found.

== Family ==
MF Schultz did not have his own family.

- Brother: Wilhelm Fedorovich von Schultz - 2nd rank captain;
- Brother: Konstantin Fedorovich von Schultz - Captain 2nd Rank;
- Sister: Olga Fedorovna Kerber - wife of Vice Admiral Ludwig Berngardovich von Kerber;
- Sister: Clara Fedorovna Garf - wife of Lieutenant General Yevgeny Georgievich von Garf;
- Cousin: Ewald Karlovich von Schultz - Captain 1st Rank.

== Bibliography ==
- Kopytov G.A. Kerbers. Family code. XIV-XXI centuries - Book. 1. - Ed. Petersburg - XXI century, 2013.
- (Mikhail Fedorovich Schultz part 1)
- (Mikhail Fedorovich Schultz part 2)
- Board of Honor of the RAS Meteorite Collection
- Egor Bratsun 2nd rank cruiser Novik
- Shter A.P. A. P. Shter. - SPb .: Sev. print, 1908. - V, III, 87 p. (stereotypical edition: St. Petersburg: Gangut, 2001).
- Yolukhovsky V.M. (2011). Famous people of the Pacific Fleet. Biographical directory. Galea Print. p. 388. ISBN 978-5-903038-13-8.
