= Battle of Korsakov =

1904 battle of the Russo-Japanese War

Coordinates: 46°50′00″N 143°00′00″E

- Part of the Russo-Japanese War
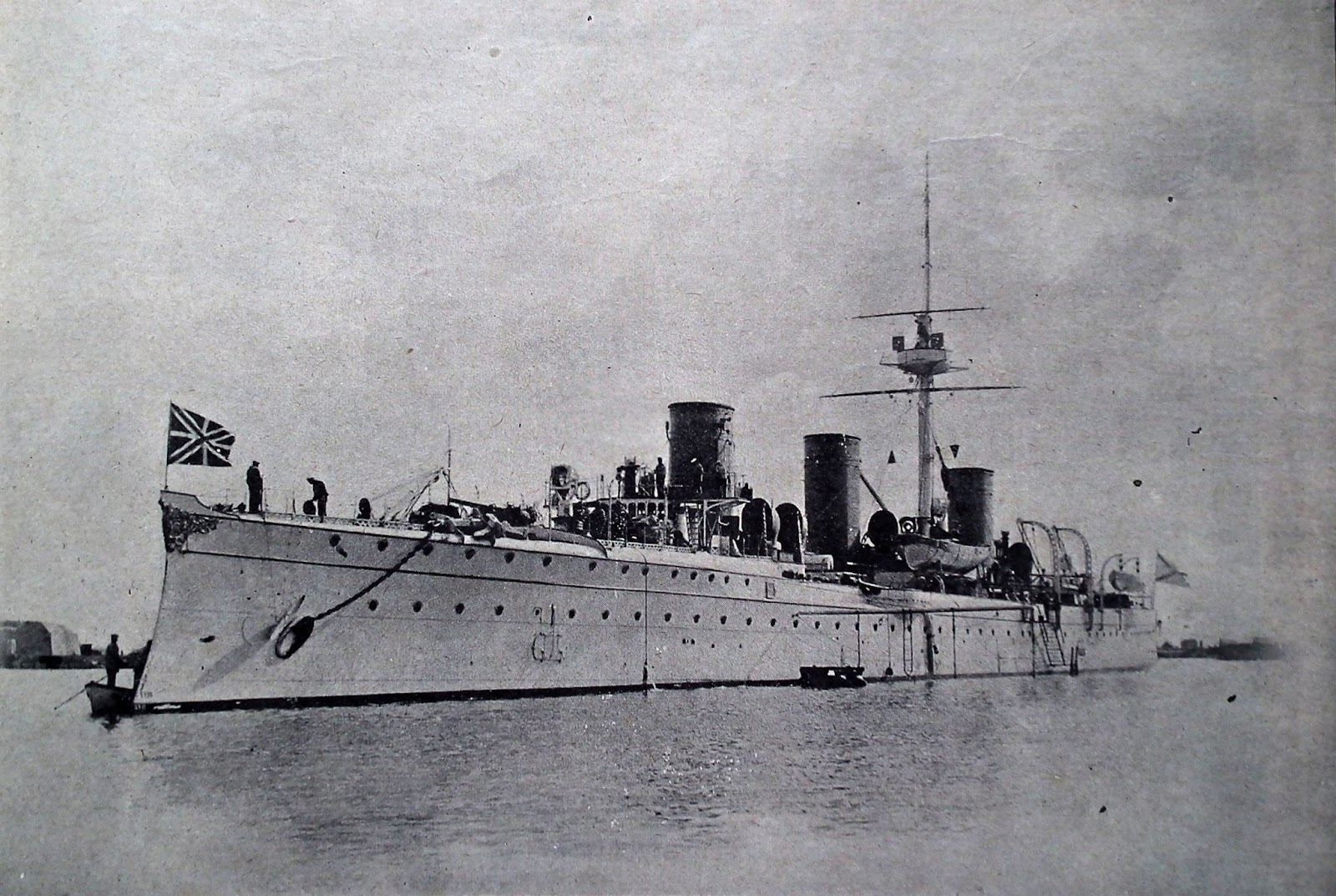
- The Russian protected cruiser Novik
Date	20 August 1904
Location	off Korsakov, Sakhalin Island, Russia
Result	Japanese victory

Belligerents
Empire of Japan	Russian Empire

Commanders and leaders
(Empire of Japan) Takagi Sukeichi (Empire of Japan) Sentō Takenaka	(Russian Empire) Mikhail von Schultz

Strength
Cruiser Chitose; Cruiser Tsushima	Cruiser Novik

Casualties and losses
Tsushima damaged	Novik scuttled

The Battle of Korsakov, a naval engagement of the Russo-Japanese War, was fought on 20 August 1904 off the southern coast of Sakhalin island. The battle foiled an attempt by the Imperial Russian Navy protected cruiser Novik at escaping Port Arthur to join the Russian cruiser squadron at Vladivostok, Russia, after the Russian Pacific Squadron was scattered in the Battle of the Yellow Sea.

== Preliminary moves ==
Novik was part of the Imperial Russian Navy squadron blockaded in the harbor at Port Arthur, Manchuria, China, by Imperial Japanese Navy forces since the outbreak of the Russo-Japanese War in February 1904. When the Russian squadron finally tried to break out of Port Arthur and reach Vladivostok, Russia, where it could unite with a Russian cruiser squadron based there, it met defeat in the Battle of the Yellow Sea on 10 August 1904. The Russian squadron broke up during the engagement, with some ships returning to Port Arthur and others fleeing southward into the Yellow Sea to seek refuge in Chinese ports. Novik, under the command of Captain 2nd Rank Mikhail Fedorovich von Schultz, a future vice admiral, was among the ships that fled south.

On 11 August, Novik encountered the Russian protected cruiser Diana – whose commanding officer intended to steam to Saigon in French Cochinchina – and destroyer Grozovoi in the Yellow Sea, and Schultz informed the other two Russian ships that he intended to take on coal and provisions at Kiaochow in the German Kaochow Bay concession in China and then steam Novik around the east of Japan to Vladivostok. Diana′s commanding officer believed that such a voyage would result in capture by Japanese forces, and he remained intent on steaming to Saigon. Diana and Grozovoi put into port at Shanghai, China, and Novik parted company with them and proceeded alone.

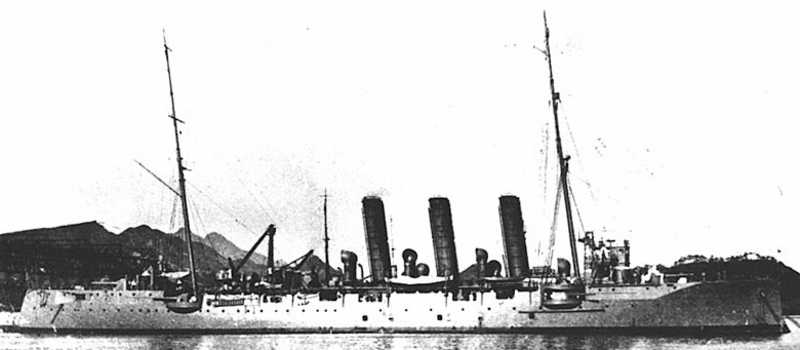
Tsushima, ca. 1905

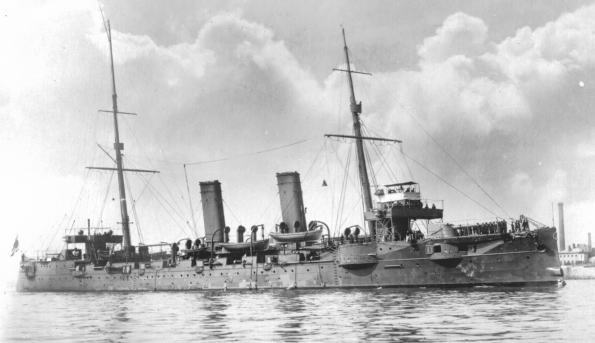
Chitose

The Japanese had limited information on Novik′s location until 14 August 1904, when they received reports that she had departed Kiaochow at dawn on 12 August and that a neutral merchant ship had sighted a cruiser resembling Novik in the East China Sea halfway between Shanghai and Nagasaki, Japan, at 10:15 on 13 August and that she apparently was bound for Van Diemen Strait (Ōsumi Strait) south of Kyushu. The Japanese initially ordered the protected cruisers Niitaka and Tsushima to proceed to Tsugaru Strait to catch Novik if she attempted to reach Vladivostok via that route, but then cancelled the order after determining that the two cruisers were needed in the Shanghai area to search for the Russian protected cruiser Askold. This decision afforded Novik the opportunity to steam northward to the east of Japan without interference. She passed south of Yakushima in the Ōsumi Islands at 05:30 on 14 August and entered the Pacific Ocean, turning north.

A Japanese merchant ship sighted Novik passing Yakushima early on 14 August, and when word of the sighting reached the Japanese naval command on the morning of 15 August, they finally were able to organize a pursuit. They ordered the protected cruisers Chitose and Tsushima under the overall command of the commanding officer of Chitose to proceed north with all speed to Tsugaru Strait and destroy Novik if she attempted to enter the Sea of Japan from the Pacific Ocean via that strait. Tsushima, commanded by Commander Sentō Takenaka, a future vice admiral, received the orders promptly, and unable to contact Chitose, proceeded northward through the Sea of Japan on her own. Chitose did not receive the order until around sundown on 15 August, and was unable to follow Tsushima until 03:30 on 16 August.

Tsushima arrived at Hakodate, Japan, on Tsugaru Strait around sunset on 17 August 1904, and Chitose met her there at about 13:00 on 18 August. They received orders to patrol in the Sea of Japan off the western side of Tsugaru Strait until 08:00 on 19 August. If Novik did not appear by that time, they were to split up, with Chitose continuing to watch Tsugaru Strait while Tsushima steamed north to investigate La Perouse Strait. When there was no sign of Novik, they duly parted company as ordered.

About an hour after Tsushima headed north, word arrived that Novik had passed through Friza Strait between Uruppu and Etorofu in the Kurile Islands and entered the Sea of Okhotsk. The Japanese surmised that Novik intended to pass through La Perouse Strait on her way to Vladivostok and would have to coal at Korsakov on the south coast of Sakhalin Island, and they ordered Chitose to join Tsushima in La Perouse Strait. Tsushima began searching the strait around 08:00 on 20 August 1904, and Chitose joined her at around 10:00. With no sign of Novik, the commanding officer of Chitose ordered Tsushima to steam into Aniva Bay and see if Novik was at Korsakov.

Novik had steamed at economical speed during her voyage east of Japan, but the Japanese were correct that she nonetheless required a coaling stop at Korsakov before she could proceed to Vladivostok. She arrived at Korsakov at sunrise on 20 August 1904, Schultz intending to take on coal and water before steaming through La Perouse Strait under the cover of darkness during the night of 20–21 August. During the day, however, Novik′s wireless detected signs of nearby Japanese wireless activity, and during the afternoon, Novik′s crew sighted Tsushima′s smoke. Fearing he could be trapped at Korsakov, Schultz decided during the early afternoon of 20 August to revise his plans, suspend coaling, and depart immediately for Vladivostok via La Perouse Strait.

== Battle ==
Tsushima approached Korsakov at 16:00 on 20 August 1904 and observed smoke rising from the harbor, ascertaining that it was from Novik. She then sighted Novik steaming south from Korsakov at 16:30 and opened fire on her. Novik replied, and a sharp but one-sided action took place over a little over a half an hour in which the more heavily armed Tsushima scored several hits on Novik, five of them below the waterline, which knocked half her boilers out of action and flooded her steering compartment. Novik turned back for Korsakov with Tsushima in pursuit, but about a half an hour later, at 17:40, Novik scored a hit on Tsushima on the waterline which flooded two compartments and caused Tsushima to list so heavily that she had to abandon the chase and stop to make emergency repairs. Novik returned to the harbor at Korsakov.

While Tsushima repaired her damage, Chitose arrived on the scene. The two Japanese cruisers watched Korsakov throughout the night of 20–21 August in case Novik made another attempt to break out. Novik′s steering gear had been damaged beyond repair, however, and Schultz, discerning from the play of searchlights to seaward during the night that the second Japanese cruiser had arrived, decided that she could not be saved. He ordered Novik to be scuttled in shallow water.

At dawn on 21 August, Chitose entered the harbor to find Novik sunk on a sandbank with her boats and launches around her removing her crew and valuable gear. Chitose closed with Novik′s wreck and opened fire on it at a range of 9,300 yards (8,500 meters). At a range of 4,400 yards (4,000 meters), she scored 20 hits. Continuing to close to a range of 2,700 yards (2,500 meters), Chitose′s commanding officer decided that Novik was beyond salvage by the Russians and withdrew.

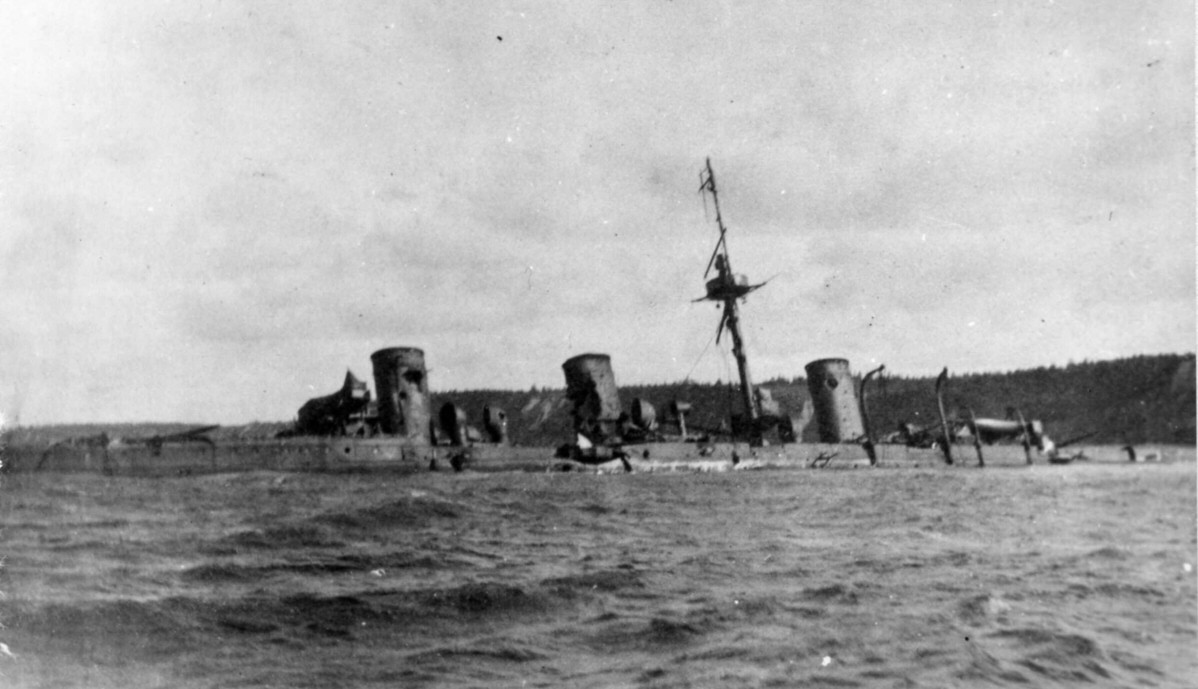
Novik scuttled off Korsakov.

== Aftermath ==
Chitose and Tsushima retired to the south. At the end of August 1904, the Japanese auxiliary cruisers Hong Kong Maru and Nippon Maru went north from Japan to patrol La Perouse Strait, and during these operations their crews stripped Novik′s wreck of all removable gear and guns before returning to Japan, where they began operations from Hakodate on 7 September 1904. Meanwhile, sixty members of Novik′s crew were assigned to an Imperial Russian Army force of about 500 men based at Korsakov with orders to engage in guerrilla warfare against any Imperial Japanese Army forces that landed on southern Sakhalin Island.

In August 1905, shortly before the conclusion of the Russo-Japanese War, a Japanese engineering team arrived at Korsakov to salvage Novik as a prize of war. After a lengthy effort to refloat her, the Japanese towed her to Yokosuka Naval Arsenal in Yokosuka, Japan, where she was repaired. On 20 August 1906, the second anniversary of the Battle of Korsakov, she was commissioned into the Imperial Japanese Navy as the aviso Suzuya. Reclassified as a second-class coastal defense ship in 1912, Suzuya was sold for scrap in 1913.

== In popular culture ==
The Battle of Korsakov is depicted in the novels Port Arthur (Порт-Артур) by Aleksandr Stepanov and Katorga (Каторга) by Valentin Pikul.

== See also ==
- List of battles of the Imperial Japanese Navy
- List of battles of the Russo-Japanese War
