= Nikolai Reitsenshtein =

Nikolai Karlovich Reitsenshtein
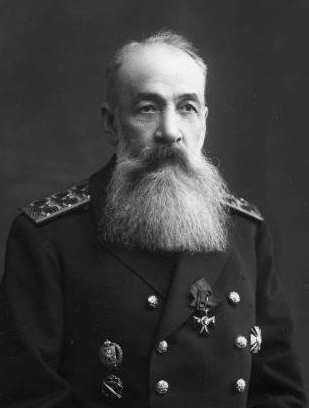
- Nikolai Karlovich Reitsenstein
- Born: 7 August 1854; St Petersburg, Russian Empire
- Died: 26 November 1916 (aged 62); Petrograd, Russian Empire
- Military career
- Allegiance: Russian Empire
- Branch: Imperial Russian Navy
- Service years: 1870–1916
- Rank: Admiral
- Conflicts: Russo-Turkish War; Russo-Japanese War

Nikolai Karlovich Reitsenshtein (Russian: Николай Карлович Рейценштейн; German: Nikolai Reitzenstein; 7 August 1854 – 26 November 1916) was a career naval officer in the Imperial Russian Navy, noted for his role during the Battle of the Yellow Sea in the Russo-Japanese War of 1904–1905.

== Biography ==
Of German descent, Reitsenshtein was born in St Petersburg as the son of Karl Ivanovich Reitsenstein, a privy councilor to the Tsar. In September 1870, he entered the Sea Cadets and entered active duty as a midshipman in March 1873. He was promoted to ensign in September 1875. He graduated from the Naval Staff College in 1877 as a specialist in mine warfare and was promoted to lieutenant in 1880. He was given his first command in 1882, the torpedo boat Chaika. Reitsenshtein subsequently served as mine officer on the frigate Knjas Poscharsky. He commanded the destroyer Raketa in 1883, and was mine officer on the cruiser Admiral Kornilov in 1885. From 1886 to 1889, he served on the staff of Vice Admiral Schmidt in the Russian Pacific Fleet, and returned to the Baltic in 1889 to command the torpedo boat Narva. Reitsenstein was promoted to captain, 2nd rank, in 1891, and chief mine officer on the staff of the Baltic Fleet from 1895 to 1898. In 1899, he was sent to Germany to oversee the completion of the cruiser Askold and was promoted to captain, 1st rank the same year.

At the start of the Russo-Japanese War, Reitsenshtein was appointed commander of the small squadron based at Vladivostok. However, on 15 March 1904, Vice Admiral Stepan Makarov reassigned him to command the cruiser squadron based at Port Arthur and promoted him to rear admiral. At the Battle of the Yellow Sea, Reitsenstein made Askold his flagship. During the battle, he noticed that the battleship Tsesarevich had been badly hit and was out of control, and was unable to signal the battleline as her signal masts had been destroyed. Reitsenshtein attempted to assume control, but his signals were either missed or ignored by the more senior commanders, and ultimately he was forced to break out of the Japanese entrapment with only the cruiser Novik and escaped to Shanghai, where the ship and crew were interned until the end of the war.

After the end of the war, Reitsenshtein was director of naval artillery training for the Baltic Fleet and was promoted to vice admiral in 1909. From 1910 to 1912 he headed a special committee to oversee the Amur Military Flotilla, and from 1912 to 1916 headed a special committee to oversee improvements to Russian coastal defenses. He was promoted to admiral on 14 April 1913 and appointed to the Admiralty Board at the end on 1915. He retired from active service on 21 June 1916 and died on 27 November in Petrograd. His grave was at the Novodevichy Cemetery.

== Honors ==
- Order of St. Stanislaus, 3rd degree, 16 April 1878
- Order of St. Anne, 3rd degree, 1 January 1882
- Order of St. Stanislaus, 2nd degree, 22 April 1888
- Order of St. Anne, 2nd degree, 6 December 1894
- Order of St Vladimir, 4th class with bow, 22 September 1897
- Order of the Red Eagle, 2nd degree, 9 March 1900 (Prussia)
- Legion of Honor, Officer, 1902 (France)
- Order of St Vladimir, 6 December 1903
- Order of St. Stanislaus, 1st degree, 1907
- Order of St. Anne, 1st degree, 1910
- Order of St Vladimir, 2nd class, 1913
- Order of the White Eagle, 30 July 1915
