= Russian cruiser Askold =

Protected cruiser of the Imperial Russian Navy

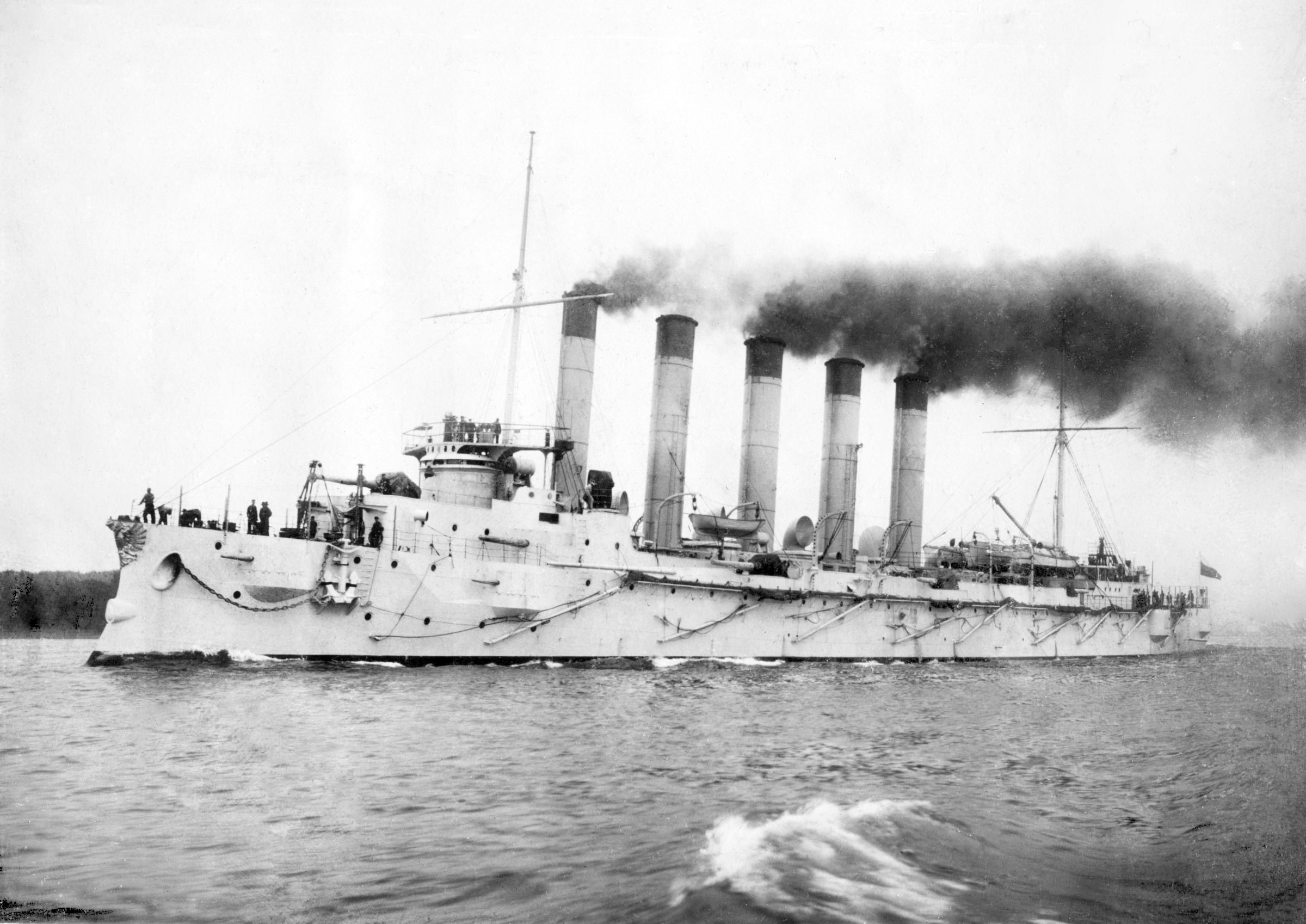
- Russian cruiser Askold on trials after construction at Kiel

History

Russian Empire
- Name: Askold (Аскольд)
- Namesake: Askold
- Builder: Germaniawerft, Kiel, German Empire
- Laid down: 8 June 1899
- Launched: 15 March 1900
- Commissioned: 25 January 1902
- In service: 1902
- Out of service: 1917
- Renamed: 1918
- Fate: Scrapped, 1922

General characteristics
- Type: Protected cruiser
- Displacement: 5,910 t (5,820 long tons) (full load)
- Length: 132.5 m (434 ft 9 in)
- Beam: 15 m (49 ft 3 in)
- Draught: 6.2 m (20 ft 4 in)
- Installed power: 9 Schultz-Thorneycroft boilers; 19,650 indicated horsepower (14,650 kW)
- Propulsion: 3 shaft triple-expansion steam engines
- Speed: 23.8 knots (44.1 km/h; 27.4 mph)
- Range: 6,500 nautical miles (12,038 km; 7,480 mi) at 10 knots (19 km/h; 12 mph)
- Complement: 580 officers and crewmen
- Armament: 12 - 6-inch (152 mm) Canet guns; 12 - 75-millimetre (3 in) Canet guns; 8 - 47-millimetre (2 in) Hotchkiss rapid-fire guns; 2 - 37-millimetre (1 in) Hotchkiss guns; 2 – 7.62 mm Maxim machine guns; 6 - 15-inch (381 mm) torpedo tubes
- Armour: Krupp armour; Sloping deck: 2–4-inch (51–102 mm); Conning tower 6-inch (152 mm)

Askold (Russian: Аскольд) was a protected cruiser built for the Imperial Russian Navy. She was named after the legendary Varangian Askold. Her thin, narrow hull and maximum speed of 23.8 knots (44.1 km/h) were considered impressive for the time.

Askold had five thin funnels which gave it a unique silhouette for any vessel in the Imperial Russian Navy. This led British sailors to nickname her Packet of Woodbines after the thin cigarettes popular at the time. However, the five funnels also had a symbolic importance, as it was popularly considered that the number of funnels was indicative of performance, and some navies were known to add extra fake funnels to impress dignitaries in less advanced countries.

== Background ==
After the completion of the Pallada class, the Imperial Russian Navy issued requirements for three large protected cruisers to three separate companies: Varyag was ordered from William Cramp & Sons in Philadelphia, United States, Askold was ordered from Krupp-Germaniawerft in Kiel, Germany, and Bogatyr from Vulcan Stettin, also in Germany. Although Askold was the fastest cruiser in the Russian fleet at the time of its commissioning, Bogatyr was selected for further development into a new class of ships, and Askold remained as a unique design.

== Operational history ==
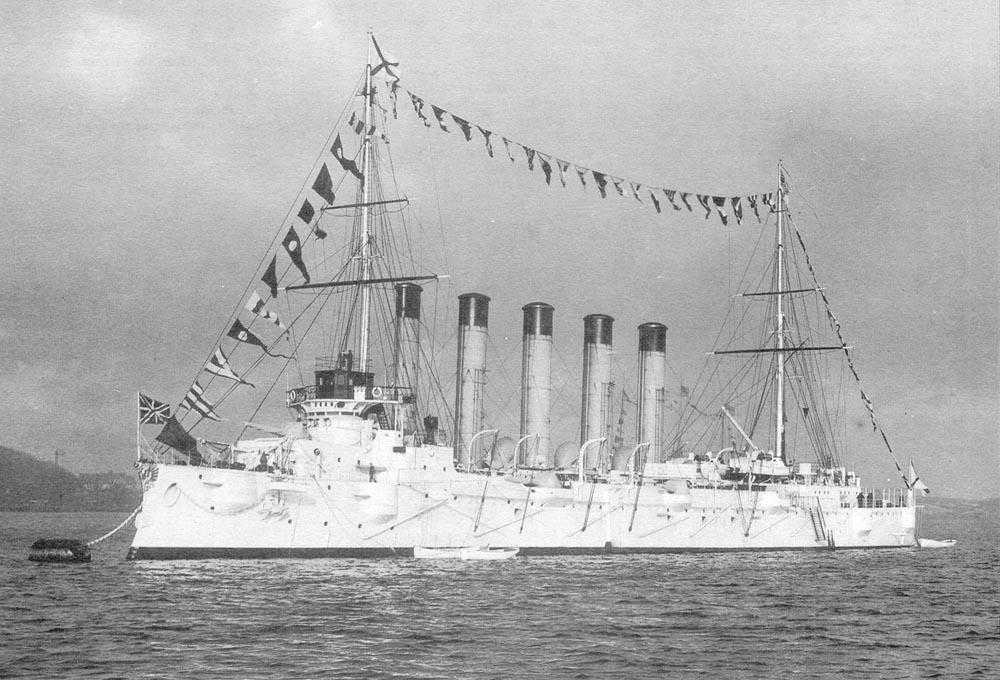
Askold in East Indies (1902)

Askold was laid down at the Germaniawerft shipyards in Kiel, Germany, on 8 June 1899, and launched on 15 March 1900 in the presence of German Emperor Wilhelm II, Prince Henry of Prussia and other members of the Prussian royal family. She was first commissioned on 25 January 1902, and initially entered service with the Russian Baltic Fleet, but only after one year was assigned to the Russian Pacific Fleet based at Port Arthur, Manchuria, instead.

Askold detoured to the Persian Gulf on her way to the Far East, and hosted the Emir of Kuwait Mubarak Al-Sabah on 1 December 1902. She arrived in Port Arthur on 13 February 1903 and shortly afterwards made port calls to Nagasaki, Kobe and Yokohama in Japan, the Taku Forts in China, the Royal Navy base at Weihaiwei and Imperial German Navy base at Qingdao. On 3 May she accompanied Novik on an official visit to Japan with Russian Minister of War, Aleksey Kuropatkin. She again visited Japan in August, calling on Hakodate with Rear Admiral Baron Olaf von Stackelberg on Rossia. She remained in Hakodate until October 1903 and was the last Russian ship to visit Japan before the outbreak of war.

=== During the Russo-Japanese War ===
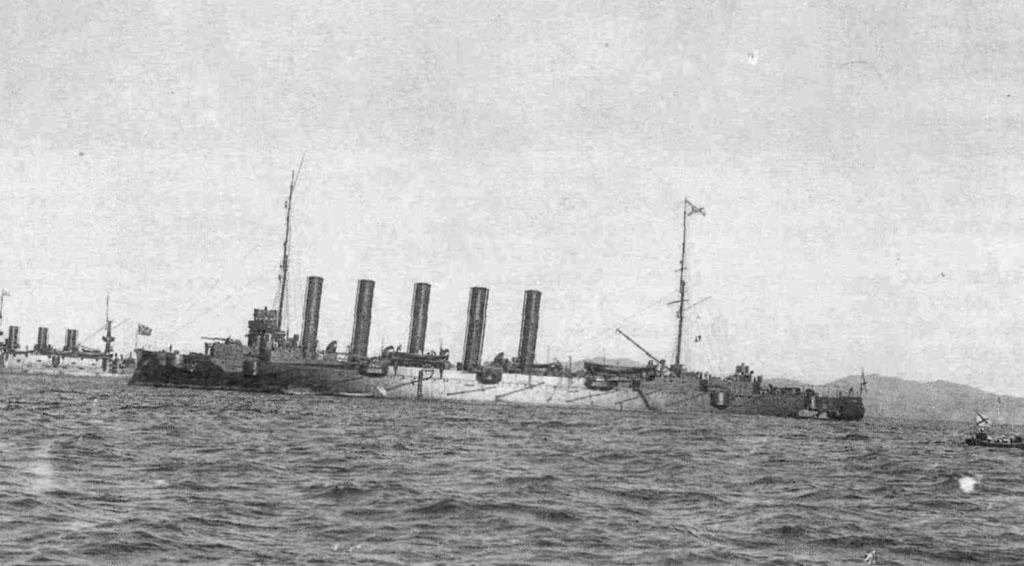
Askold at Port Arthur (1904)

From the start of the Russo-Japanese War of 1904-1905, Askold was one of the most active vessels in the Russian fleet. She was moored within the protected confines of Port Arthur during the initial pre-emptive strike launched by the Imperial Japanese Navy during the Battle of Port Arthur, and took only minor damage.

During the Battle of the Yellow Sea, she was flagship for Rear Admiral Nikolai Reitsenstein’s cruiser squadron during the failed attempt to escape the Japanese blockade and to link up with forces in Vladivostok. Together with Novik, Askold took heavy damage, but escaped from the pursuing Japanese fleet to Shanghai, where she was interned until the end of the war.

=== With the Siberian Flotilla ===
On 11 October 1905, Askold was allowed to return to service with the Russian Navy, returning to Vladivostok on 1 November. In 1906, she spent most of the year in dry-dock for repairs. By 1 February 1907, she was able to make a training cruise from Vladivostok to Shanghai, where she ran aground in March. The damage was minor, and she was able to call on Hong Kong, Amoy, Shanghai and Qingtao on her way back to Vladivostok. In 1908, with the gradual withdrawal of larger vessels to the Baltic Sea, she became the flagship of the Russian Siberian Flotilla. However, mechanical problems persisted, and she remained largely out of operational service from 1908 through 1911. After replacement of her boilers in September 1912, she was only able to achieve 17.46 knots (32.34 km/h), with problems partly attributable to low-quality Chinese coal. After further repairs to her hull by the end of 1912, she was able to achieve 20.11 knots (37.24 km/h). At the end of 1913, she made a long-distance voyage to Hong Kong, Saigon, Padang, Batavia, Surabaya and Manila back to Vladivostok. She suffered more damage by hitting a naval mine in 1914, and it was felt that only a major overhaul at a European shipyard could restore her to operational status. However, before this could occur, Askold was involved in a new war.

=== World War I service ===
At the start of World War I, Askold was part of the Allied (British-French-Japanese) joint task force pursuing the German East Asia Squadron under Admiral Maximilian von Spee. In August 1914 she patrolled the area to the east of the Philippines, resupplying out of Hong Kong and Singapore. In September and October, she was assigned to escort duty in the Indian Ocean.

Askold was then assigned to the Mediterranean Sea for operations off the coasts of Syria and Palestine for coastal bombardment and commerce raiding operations based from Beirut and Haifa. In 1915, she was involved in operations against the Ottoman Navy and the Austrian Navy in Greece and Bulgaria, including support for troop landings in the Gallipoli Campaign.

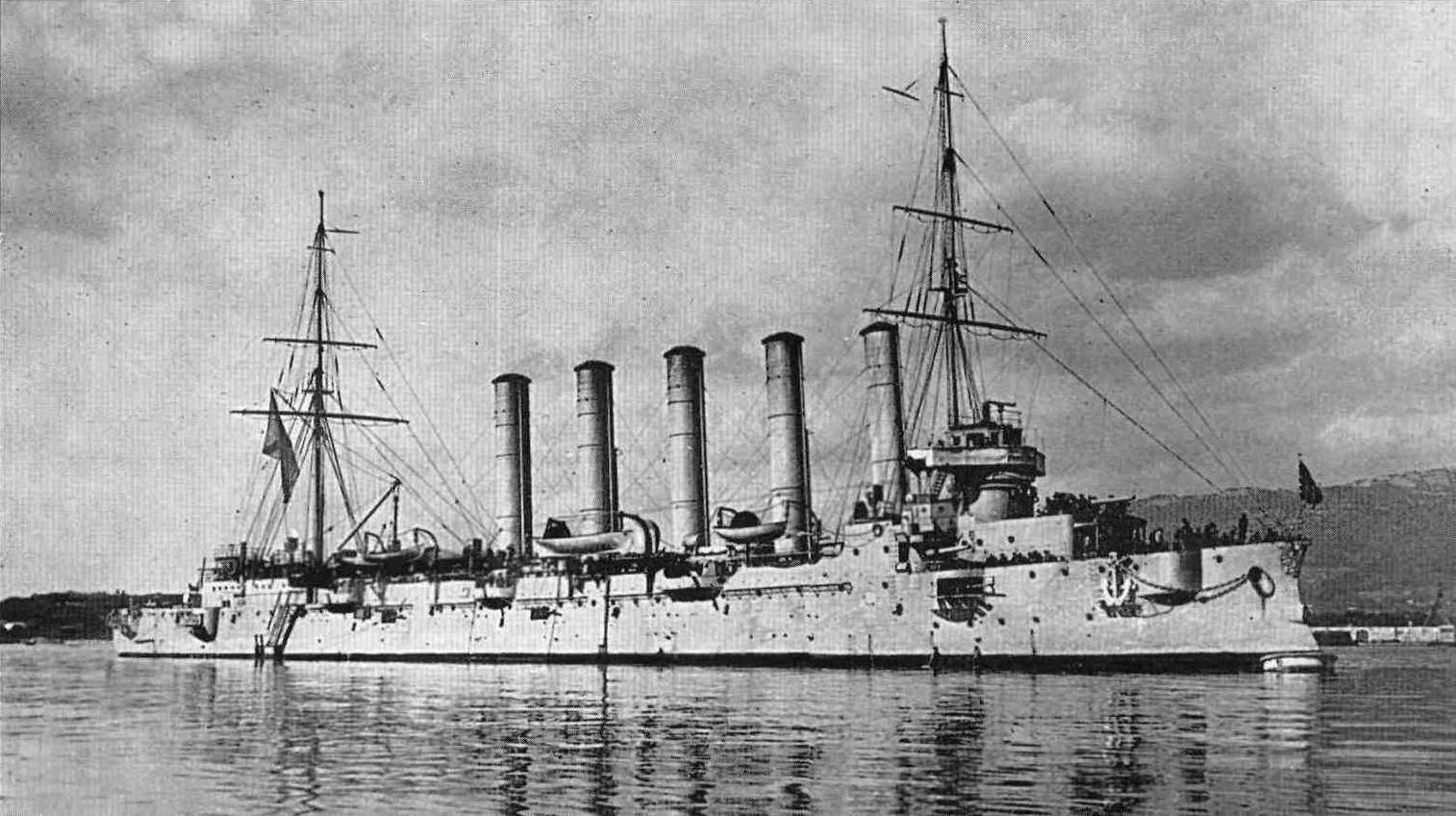
Askold during World War I

She underwent an extensive refit in Toulon, France, beginning in March 1916, which involved the replacement of her guns. The repairs were delayed by lack of materials and manpower. Crew tensions flared as the crewmen were forced to live on board, whereas the officers went to Paris. On 19 August there was an explosion in her powder magazine attributed to sabotage, and four crewmen were later convicted and sentenced to death. Repairs were completed only in December. Askold was then transferred to the Barents Sea theatre of operations, but suffered from storm damage after departing from Gibraltar in late December, which required further repairs in Plymouth. In February, with the fall of the Russian Empire in the February Revolution, Askold pledged allegiance to the Russian Provisional Government. She departed Scotland on 4 June 1917 and was then based at Murmansk. After the armistice with Germany in December 1917, Askold was demobilized and plans were made to place her in storage at Arkhangelsk.

=== In Royal Navy service ===
Askold was seized in Kola Bay in 1918 by the Royal Navy after the Russian Revolution and commissioned as HMS Glory IV. She was based at Gareloch, Scotland but was used primarily as a depot ship.

On the conclusion of the Russian Civil War, she was offered to the new Soviet Navy in return for costs incurred. Soviet inspectors found that she was in bad shape and sold her for scrap. In 1922, she was towed to Hamburg, where she was scrapped. Alexey Krylov sailed on her first voyage and was part of the commission that decided her fate. He writes about both events in his memoir.
