= Japanese cruiser Tsushima =

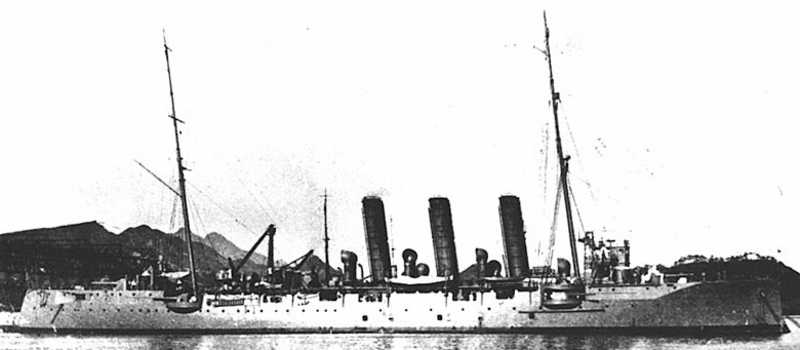
- Tsushima in 1905

History

Empire of Japan
- Name: Tsushima
- Ordered: Fiscal Year of 1897
- Builder: Kure Naval Arsenal
- Laid down: 1 October 1901
- Launched: 15 December 1902
- Completed: 14 February 1904
- Stricken: 1936
- Fate: Expended as a torpedo target, 1944

General characteristics
- Class & type: Niitaka-class cruiser
- Displacement: 3,366 long tons (3,420 t)
- Length: 102 m (334 ft 8 in) w/l
- Beam: 13.44 m (44 ft 1 in)
- Draft: 4.92 m (16 ft 2 in)
- Installed power: 9,500 ihp (7,100 kW)
- Propulsion: 2 × vertical triple expansion reciprocating engines; 16 × Niclausse boilers; 2 × screws; 600 tons coal
- Speed: 20 kn (23 mph; 37 km/h)
- Complement: 287–320
- Armament: 6 × 15.2 cm (6 in)/40 naval guns; 10 × QF 12 pounder 12 cwt naval guns; 4 × QF 3 pounder Hotchkiss guns
- Armor: Deck: 76 mm (3 in); Conning tower: 100 mm (4 in)

Tsushima (対馬) was a Niitaka-class cruiser of the Imperial Japanese Navy. The vessel was a sister ship to Niitaka and was named for Tsushima Province, one of the ancient provinces of Japan, and corresponding to the strategic island group between Japan and Korea.

== Background ==
The Niitaka-class cruisers were ordered by the Imperial Japanese Navy under its 2nd Emergency Expansion Program, with a budget partly funded by the war indemnity received from the Empire of China as part of the settlement of the Treaty of Shimonoseki ending the First Sino-Japanese War. The class was intended for high speed reconnaissance missions. Tsushima was the first ship to be built by the new Kure Naval Arsenal, located at Kure, Hiroshima. Due to lack of experience by the builders, Tsushima took an extraordinary long time to compete, despite her small size and relatively simple design, with the keel laid down on 1 October 1901 and launching on 15 December 1902. Tsushima was not completed until 14 February 1904.

== Design ==
In terms of design, Tsushima was very conservative in layout and similar to, but somewhat larger than the earlier Japanese-designed Suma. The increased displacement, heavier armor and lower center of gravity resulted in a more seaworthy and powerful vessel than Suma, and enabled Tsushima to outclass many other contemporary protected cruisers.

In terms of armament, it is noteworthy that Tsushima was not equipped with torpedoes. Observing problems experienced by the United States Navy during the Spanish–American War with torpedo reliability and the dangers of sympathetic detonation, it was decided not to use this weapon on the new cruisers. The main battery was standardized to the QF 6-inch /40 naval gun found on most contemporary Japanese cruisers.

The Niitaka-class cruisers were fitted with 16 Niclausse boilers, a great improvement on the locomotive boilers of the Suma class.

== Service history ==
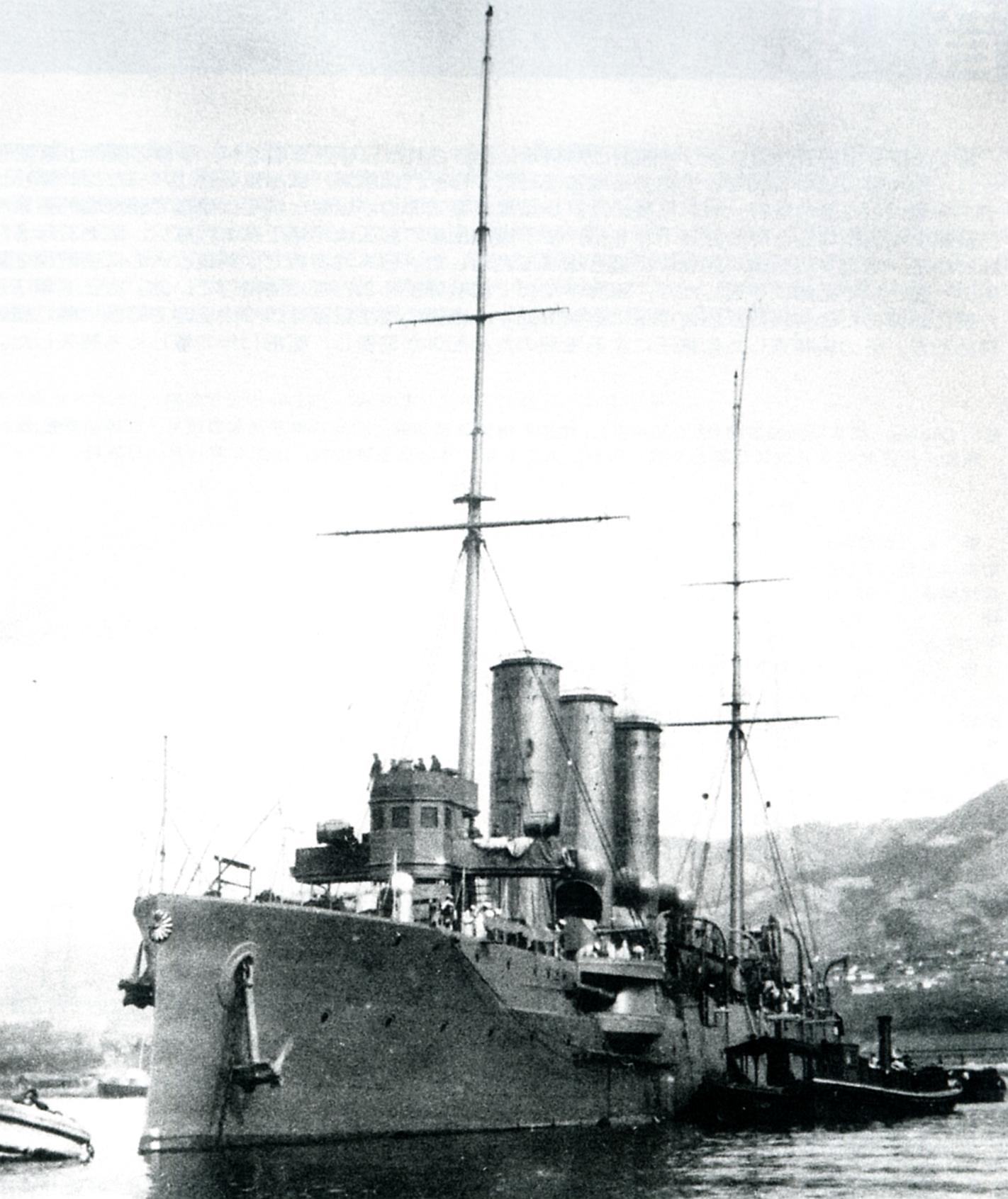
At Kure, on completion in 1904

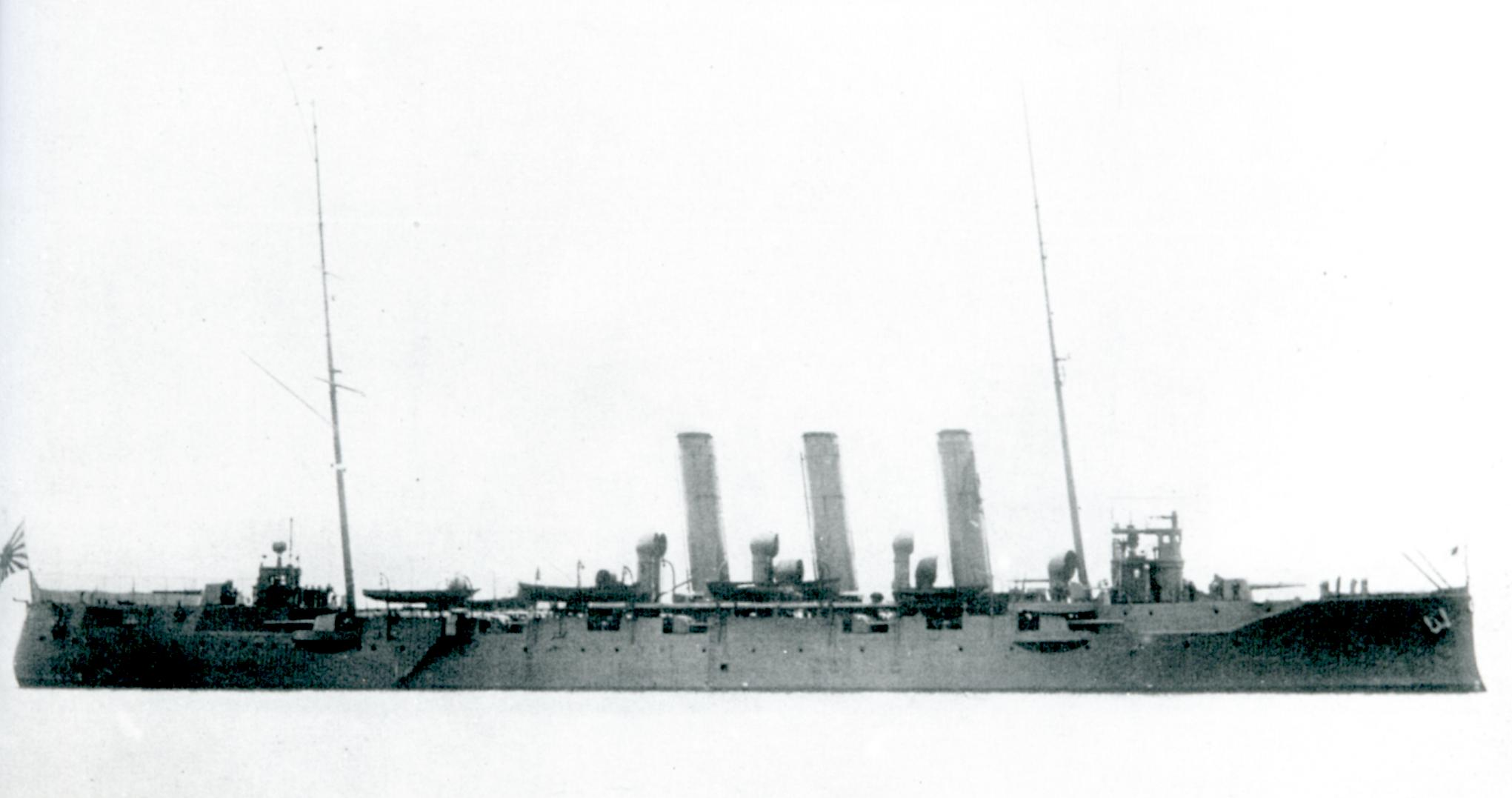
In 1905

=== Russo-Japanese War ===
Tsushima was commissioned during the middle of the Russo-Japanese War, but she was present with the 4th Detachment of the Japanese 2nd Fleet and participated in the shore bombardment of Russian positions during the Battle of Port Arthur on 9 March 1904. From April, she was assigns to patrols of the Korea Strait and the Sea of Japan, but was not in position to participate in Battle off Ulsan on 14 August 1904.

On 15 August, Tsushima and Chitose pursued the Russian cruiser Novik, which she fought at the Battle of Korsakov. During the duel, Tsushima scored 14 hits on Novik, but was holes under her waterline by a shot from Novik and was forced to stop for repairs. She did, however, assist in the rescue of Russian sailors off Novik after the battle. At the crucial final Battle of Tsushima on 27 May 1905, Tsushima was part of the Japanese squadron attacking the Russian cruisers Oleg, Aurora and Zhemchug as well as the already heavily damaged battleship Knyaz Suvorov. Tsushima took six hits during the engagement, which killed four crewmen and a senior officer. On 28 May 1905, Tsushima took part in the final combat of the battle against the cruiser Dmitrii Donskoi.

After the war, Tsushima was assigned patrol duties off of the China coast.

=== World War I ===
At the start of World War I, Tsushima was initially assigned to patrol of the sea lanes between Borneo and Timor against German commerce raiders as part of Japan's contribution to the Allied war effort under the Anglo-Japanese Alliance. However, she was reassigned to the First Southern Expeditionary Squadron based in Fiji from December 1914 to protect British shipping around Australia and New Zealand from German commerce raiders and U-boats. The First Southern Expeditionary Squadron also consisted of the battlecruiser Kurama, two destroyers, and later the cruisers Chikuma, Yahagi and Ikoma. Together with the Japanese-American Expeditionary Squadron (which included the cruisers Izumo and Asama, and the battleship Hizen), she engaged in the pursuit of the Imperial German Navy Admiral Graf Maximilian von Spee's German East Asia Squadron.

During the February 1915 Singapore Mutiny by Indian Sepoy troops against the British in Singapore, the Japanese government helped suppress the uprising by sending 158 marines from the cruisers Otowa, Niitaka and Tsushima.

From mid-1915 to 1918, Tsushima and her sister ship Niitaka were permanently based at the Cape Town, assisting the Royal Navy in patrolling the sea lanes linking Europe to the east.

=== Post-war career ===
After the end of World War I, Tsushima was part of the Japanese fleet participating in the Japanese intervention in Siberia to help the White Russian forces against the Bolsheviks in the Russian Civil War by covering the landings of Japanese troops in Vladivostok.

On 1 September 1921, Tsushima was re-designated a 2nd class coastal defense vessel. She was re-armed in 1922 to carry six 15.2 cm and eight 12-pounder guns, but later an extra 12-pounder anti-aircraft gun was added. Tsushima's primary patrol area was along the Yangtze River in China, where as flagship for Kichisaburō Nomura, she commanded a squadron of gunboats protecting Japanese citizens and economic interests within China.

Tsushima was partially disarmed in 1930 and was used as a training vessel. She was struck from the navy list in 1936 and was re-designated as training hulk Hai Kan No. 10 at Yokosuka Naval District until 1 April 1939. She was expended in the Pacific Ocean off Miura, Kanagawa, Japan, as a torpedo target in 1944.
