= Russian gunboat Opyt =

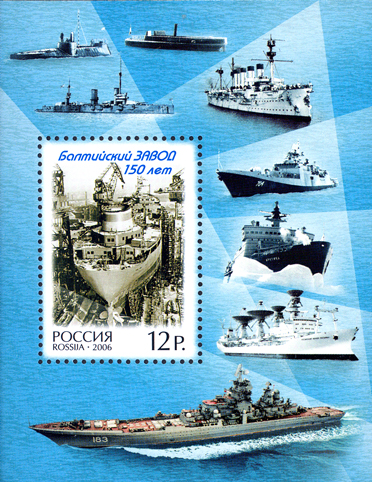
- The Opyt depicted in a 2006 drawing

History
- Builder: Carr and MacPherson, St. Petersburg
- Laid down: 1861
- Launched: September 27, 1861
- Fate: stricken 1906

General characteristics
- Type: Gunboat
- Displacement: 270 t (270 long tons)
- Length: 37.7 m (124 ft)
- Beam: 6.8 m (22 ft)
- Draft: 1.8 m (5 ft 11 in)
- Installed power: 147 kW (197 hp)
- Speed: 8.5 knots (15.7 km/h)
- Complement: 90 officers and men
- Armament: 1 × 196 mm (7.7 in) smoothbore gun
- Armor: Iron; 114 mm (4.5 in) on 305 mm (12.0 in) teak lining

The gunboat Opyt (Russian: Опыт: experience) was the first ironclad warship commissioned by the Imperial Russian Navy. It was built by Carr and MacPherson at the Baltic shipyard in Saint Petersburg. English and Russian wrought iron plates 1200 x 1000 mm in size protected the front part of the gunboat.
