= Akatsuki =

Akatsuki (暁) may refer to:

== Places ==
- Akatsuki Gakuenmae Station, is a passenger railway station located in the city of Yokkaichi

== People ==
- Akatsuki Kambayashi (上林 暁), Japanese author in the I Novel genre
- Akira Akatsuki (暁月 あきら), Japanese manga artist
- Natsume Akatsuki (暁 なつめ), Japanese light novel author and manga writer

== Ships ==
- Akatsuki-class destroyer
  - Akatsuki-class destroyer (1931), was a class of four destroyers of the Imperial Japanese Navy
  - Akatsuki-class destroyer (1901), was a class of two torpedo boat destroyers (TBDs)
- Japanese destroyer Akatsuki (1932), was the twenty-first Fubuki-class destroyer
- Japanese patrol vessel Akatsuki, is a Reimei-class patrol vessel
- Japanese destroyer Akatsuki
- Japanese destroyer Akatsuki (1901) was the lead ship of two Akatsuki-class destroyers

== Fiction ==
Series

- Akatsuki (TV series), a Japanese television drama series
- Akatsuki Blitzkampf is a series of Japanese dōjin 2D fighting games
- Akatsuki no Dassō, a 1950 Japanese anti-war film
- Akatsuki no Kuruma is the third single of J-pop duo FictionJunction Yuuka
- Akatsuki no Inu Japanese manga series
- Akatsuki-iro no Senpuku Majo Japanese manga series

Characters

- Akatsuki (Naruto), a criminal organization in the manga series Naruto
- Akatsuki, a character in the video game Kantai Collection
- Akatsuki, a character in the novel series Log Horizon
- Akatsuki Kain, a character in the manga series Vampire Knight
- Akatsuki, a character in the video game Akatsuki Blitzkampf
- Akatsuki Ousawa, a character in the novel series Aesthetica of a Rogue Hero
- Akatsuki Augus-Mixta, a character in the anime series Mobile Suit Gundam: Iron-Blooded Orphans
- Akatsuki, a three man team in the video game .hack//G.U. Volume I //Rebirth
- Kirika Akatsuki, a character in the anime series Symphogear

Songs

- Akatsuki is the fifth song on the eponymous debut album by the Japanese metal band Babymetal
- Akatsuki no Requiem is the third track created by the Japanese band Linked Horizon
- Kodoku no Akatsuki is a song by Japanese musician Ringo Sheena

Others

- Akatsuki/Ikuoku no Chandelier, is a double A-side single released by rock band Alice Nine
- ORB-01 Akatsuki, a weapon in the anime series Mobile Suit Gundam SEED Destiny
- Akatsuki, a weapon in the anime series Code Geass
- Akatsuki, a city in the manga series Tegami Bachi

== Others ==
- Akatsuki (spacecraft), a former uncrewed Venus orbiter
- Akatsuki-class destroyer, any of three classes of destroyers of the Imperial Japanese Navy
- Japanese destroyer Akatsuki, any of three destroyers of the Imperial Japanese Navy
- Akatsuki (train), operated between Kyoto and Nagasaki in Japan
- Japanese patrol vessel Akatsuki, launched in 2020
- Akatsuki Japan
  - Japan's national men's basketball team
  - Japan's national women's basketball team
- Akatsuki Games, founded 2010 in Japan

== See also ==
- Ōmagatoki, a Japanese word for "dusk"
