= Japanese destroyer Akatsuki =

Three destroyers of the Imperial Japanese Navy have been named Akatsuki (暁, ”dawn” or "daybreak"):

- Japanese destroyer Akatsuki (1901), lead ship of the Akatsuki-class destroyers of the Imperial Japanese Navy commissioned in 1903 and sunk in May 1904 during the Russo-Japanese War
- Russian destroyer Reshitel‘nyi, an Imperial Russian Navy Sokol-class destroyer captured by the Japanese in August 1904 during the Russo-Japanese War which subsequently served in the Imperial Japanese Navy as Akatsuki from 1904 to 1905 and as Yamabiko (also transliterated as Yamahiko) from 1905 to 1917
- Japanese destroyer Akatsuki (1932), a Fubuki-class destroyer or lead ship of the Akatsuki-class destroyers of the Imperial Japanese Navy during World War II

== See also ==
- Akatsuki (disambiguation)
- Akatsuki-class destroyer
- Japanese patrol vessel Akatsuki, a Reimei-class patrol vessel launched in 2020 for the Japan Coast Guard
