= Japanese destroyer Asashio (1902) =

Shirakumo-class destroyer

History

Empire of Japan
- Name: Asashio
- Namesake: 朝潮 ("Morning Tide")
- Ordered: 1900
- Builder: John I. Thornycroft & Company, Chiswick, England
- Yard number: Destroyer No. 16
- Laid down: 3 April 1901
- Launched: 10 January 1902
- Completed: 4 May 1902
- Commissioned: 4 May 1902
- Reclassified: Third-class destroyer 28 August 1912; Special-duty vessel (second-class minesweeper) 1 April 1922; General service ship (target ship) 1 April 1923
- Stricken: 1 April 1923
- Fate: Hulked 2 May 1925; Sold 5 April 1926

General characteristics
- Type: Destroyer
- Displacement: 322 tons normal, 432 tons full load
- Length: 215 ft 9 in (65.76 m) waterline; 216 ft 9 in (66.07 m) overall
- Beam: 20 ft 9 in (6.32 m)
- Draught: 8 ft 3 in (2.51 m)
- Depth: 13 ft 9 in (4.19 m)
- Propulsion: 2-shaft reciprocating engines, 4 boilers, engine output 7,000 hp (5,200 kW)
- Speed: 31 knots (57 km/h; 36 mph)
- Complement: 62
- Armament: 1 x QF 12 pounder 12 cwt naval gun; 5 × QF 6 pounder (57 mm) guns; 2 × 450 mm (18 in) torpedoes

Service record
- Operations: Russo-Japanese War; Battle of Port Arthur; Battle of the Yellow Sea; Battle of Tsushima; World War I; Battle of Tsingtao

Asashio (朝潮, "Morning Tide") was one of two Shirakumo-class destroyers built for the Imperial Japanese Navy in the early 1900s. During the Russo-Japanese War (1904–1905), she took part in the Battle of Port Arthur in February 1904, the Battle of the Yellow Sea in August 1904, and the Battle of Tsushima in May 1905. During World War I (1914–1918), she participated in the Battle of Tsingtao in 1914.

== Construction and commissioning ==
Authorized under the 1900 naval program, Asashio was laid down on 3 April 1901 as Destroyer No. 16 by John I. Thornycroft & Company at Chiswick, England. Launched on 10 January 1902 and named Asashio, she was completed on 4 May 1902 and commissioned the same day.

== Service history ==
Asashio departed England on 7 July 1902 to make her delivery voyage to Japan. She completed it with her arrival at Yokosuka on 20 November 1902.

When the Russo-Japanese War broke out on 8 February 1904, Asashio was part of the 1st Destroyer Division of the 1st Fleet. The war began that evening with the Battle of Port Arthur, a Japanese surprise attack on Imperial Russian Navy warships anchored in the outer roadstead of the Russian naval base at Port Arthur, China. Ten Japanese destroyers of the 1st, 2nd, and 3rd Destroyer Divisions made a torpedo attack in three waves, with the four destroyers of the 1st Destroyer Division (Akatsuki, Asashio, Kasumi, and Shirakumo) and Ikazuchi of the 2nd Destroyer Division constituting the first wave. They closed to about 650 yards (590 m) from the Russian ships and fired nine torpedoes. One of Kasumi′s torpedoes hit the Russian protected cruiser Pallada.

The Japanese maintained a blockade of Port Arthur over the next several months. On the morning of 10 August 1904, the Russian squadron at Port Arthur put to sea in an attempt to reach Vladivostok. Asashio took part that day in the Battle of the Yellow Sea, in which the Russians suffered a defeat and the Russian squadron commander, Rear Admiral Wilgelm Vitgeft, was killed. In the battle's aftermath, the Russian squadron scattered, some ships returning to Port Arthur and others trying to reach various other ports in East Asia with Japanese forces in pursuit. The Russian destroyer Reshitel‘nyi put to sea from Port Arthur as soon as darkness fell on 10 August carrying a dispatch about Vitgeft's decision to attempt to reach Vladivostok. She ran the Japanese blockade and made for Chefoo, China, where the dispatch could be sent to Russian authorities by telegraph. Due to Reshitel‘nyi′s poor material condition, her crew had orders not to attempt to return to Port Arthur but rather to disarm her and allow Chinese authorities to intern her at Chefoo in accordance with international law and China's status as a neutral country. Upon her arrival at Chefoo on 11 August 1904, her commanding officer, Lieutenant Mikhail Sergeevich Roschakovsky, contacted the local Chinese authorities to make arrangements for his ship's internment.

Illustration of the Japanese seizure of the Russian destroyer Reshitel‘nyi at Chefoo, China, from Le Petit Parisien, 28 August 1904.

The Japanese quickly learned of Reshitel‘nyi′s presence at Chefoo and issued orders to Japanese forces to disregard any disarmament and either capture or sink her. As Reshitel‘nyi′s crew was disarming her, Asashio and Kasumi entered the port. According to the Russian account of the ensuing incident, a Japanese boarding party from the destroyers went aboard Reshitel‘nyi at 03:00 on 12 August, and the officer commanding the boarding party demanded that Reshitel‘nyi either surrender or put to sea within two hours and fight the Japanese destroyers in international waters. Roschakovsky rejected the Japanese demands, arguing that he was disarming his ship for internment in accordance with international law, that the Japanese demands violated Chinese neutrality, and that in any event Reshitel‘nyi could not get underway due to engine problems. The Japanese officer countered that Chinese neutrality did not protect Reshitel‘nyi, claiming that the Battle of the Yellow Sea had not yet ended because Russian ships still were in the process of fleeing the engagement and that Japan had a right to hot pursuit of Russian ships even in neutral waters under those circumstances. As the argument continued, the Japanese attempted to hoist their flag aboard Reshitel‘nyi, and Roschakovsky threw the Japanese officer overboard. Roschakovsky was dragged over the side as well, and the Japanese fired shots at him in the water as he attempted to get back aboard his ship. Hand-to-hand combat between Russian and Japanese sailors ensued while Reshitel‘nyi′s crew set off an explosive charge in an attempt to destroy her by detonating her ammunition magazine, but the magazine did not explode and the Japanese succeeded in capturing her after about half the Russian crew and half the Japanese boarding party had been thrown overboard. During the skirmish, two Russians were killed and four, including Roschakovsky, were wounded, while the Japanese lost two men killed and 11 wounded. The men in the water eventually swam ashore, and the Japanese, ignoring the protests of the senior Imperial Chinese Navy officer at Chefoo, towed Reshitel‘nyi to Dalniy, China, as a prize.

The Japanese offered a different narrative of the incident. They claimed that Reshitel‘nyi was not being disarmed but rather was preparing to put to sea, that they had been invited to come aboard to inspect her, and that when they arrived to conduct the inspection they were insulted, thrown into the water, and endangered by an explosion. However, the local Chinese authorities backed the Russian version of events and the press in the United States criticized the Japanese action.

After transferring to the 4th Destroyer Division in the 2nd Fleet, Asashio participated in the Battle of Tsushima on 27–28 May 1905. Responding to a signal from the unprotected cruiser Chihaya on the afternoon of 27 May, the 4th Destroyer Division (Asagiri, Asashio, Murasame, and Shirakumo) mounted a torpedo attack against the damaged and burning Russian battleship Knyaz Suvorov, which was making 10 knots (19 km/h; 12 mph). Approaching Knyaz Suvorov at 18 knots (33 km/h; 21 mph) on the opposite course from her, Asagiri and Murasame each launched a torpedo at a range of about 800 metres (870 yd) and Asashio got off two shots, but none of the torpedoes hit. Asagiri and Murasame closed to 300 metres (330 yd) and each fired a second torpedo, and Murasame scored an apparent hit that caused Knyaz Suvorov to heel 10 degrees. Shirakumo did not fire, finding that Knyaz Suvorov had lost all steaming power and come to a stop before she could achieve a firing position. Knyaz Suvorov later sank. In the evening of 27 May, the 4th Destroyer Division torpedoed the Russian battleship Sissoi Veliky, which damaged her steering and intensified flooding. The Sissoi Veliky later surrendered but sank from the flooding before reaching port. In the early morning of 28 May, the 4th Destroyer Division intercepted the Russian battleship Navarin and laid 6 strings of mines ahead of her. Two mines struck Navarin, which quickly capsized and sank.

Asashio was reclassified as a third-class destroyer on 28 August 1912.

After Japan entered World War I in August 1914, Asashio took part in the Battle of Tsingtao in 1914.

On 1 April 1922, Asashio was reclassified as a "special-duty vessel" for use as a second-class minesweeper. On 1 April 1923, she was stricken from the naval register and reclassified as a general service ship for use as a target ship. She was hulked on 2 May 1925 and sold on 5 April 1926.

== Commanding officers ==
- Lieutenant Commander Gonsaburo Horiuchi 10 September 1901 – 23 January 1902 (pre-commissioning)
- Lieutenant Commander Gonsaburo Horiuchi 23 January 1902 – 7 February 1903
- Lieutenant Commander Mitsuhiro Matsunaga 7 February 1903 – unknown
- Lieutenant Commander Danichi Nanzato 11 September 1904 – 5 August 1905
- Lieutenant Commander Tomojiro Beppu 12 December 1905 – 14 March 1906
- Lieutenant Gokichi Shibauchi 14 March 1906 – 1 April 1906
- Lieutenant Yahei Nakahara 1 April 1906 – 23 April 1906
- Lieutenant Yuzo Okada: 23 April 1906 – 1 February 1908
- Lieutenant Yasuhiro Yamamoto: 1 February 1908 – 20 November 1908
- Lieutenant Jiro Arashiki: 20 November 1908 – 14 December 1908
- Lieutenant Keiichi Soejima 14 December 1908 – 23 December 1908
- Lieutenant Shoichi Akiyoshi 23 December 1908 – 20 February 1909
- Lieutenant Yoshio Yamanaka 20 February 1909 – 1 December 1909
- Lieutenant Jonobu Ota 1 December 1909 – 17 December 1910
- Lieutenant Jiro Araki 17 December 1910 – 28 April 1911
- Lieutenant Koshiro Oikawa 28 April 1911 – 1 December 1912
- Lieutenant Tetsunosuke Fujiyoshi 1 December 1912 – 1 December 1913
- Lieutenant Bunichi Nakagawa 1 December 1913 – unknown
- Lieutenant Commander Mitsutoshi Miyabe Unknown – 13 December 1915
- Lieutenant Shigemi Iwaki 13 December 1915 – 1 July 1916
- Lieutenant Toyokichi Kikuchi 3 July 1916 – 11 August 1917
- Lieutenant Nobuo Kumabe 11 August 1917 – 1 December 1917
- Lieutenant Jiro Narita 1 December 1917 – 1 December 1918
- Lieutenant Gizo Nakamaruo 1 December 1918 – 1 December 1920
- Lieutenant Miyazaki Taira 1 December 1920 – unknown
