= Naokuni Nomura =

Japanese admiral (1885–1973)

Admiral Naokuni Nomura
- 野村 直邦
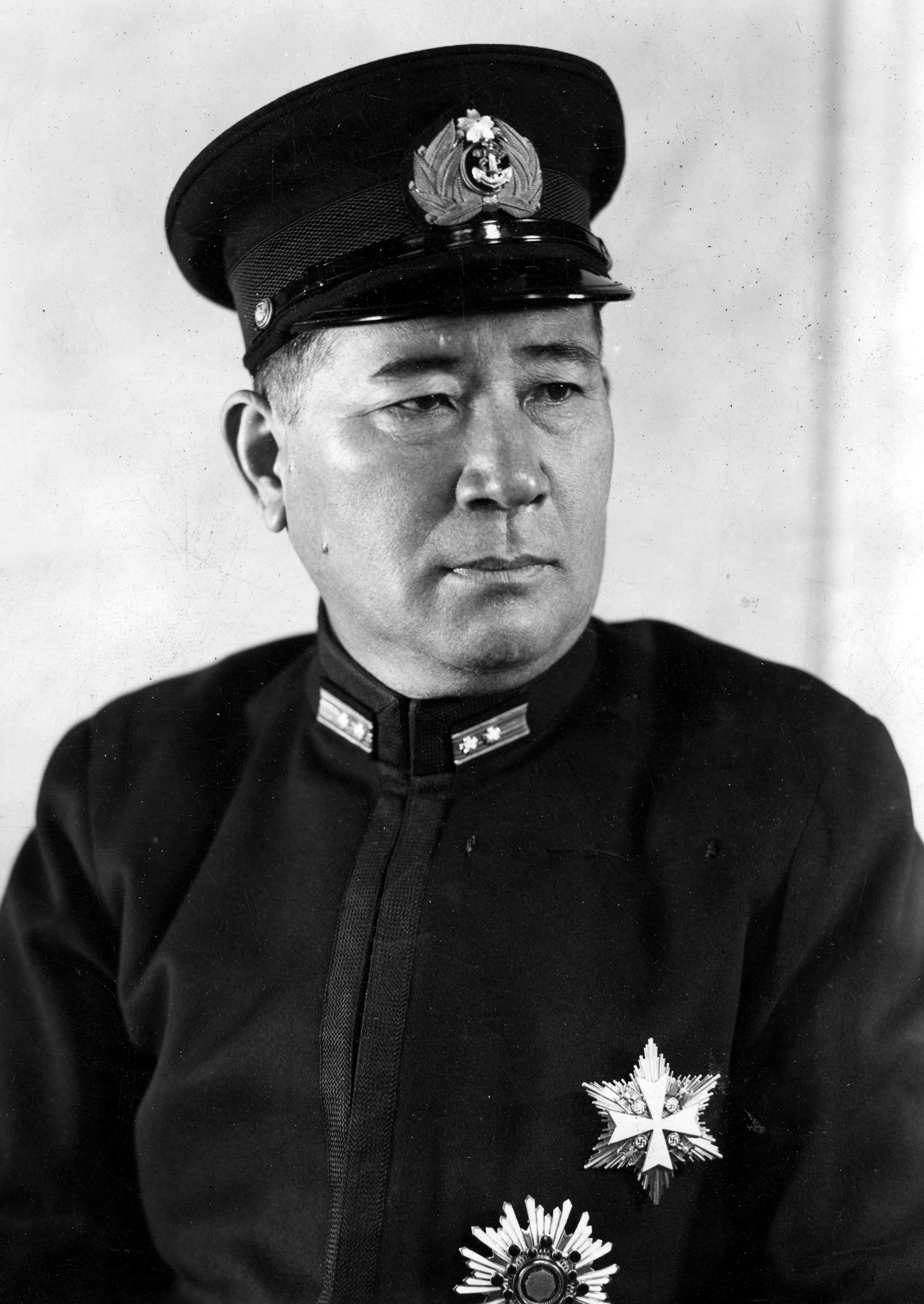

Minister of the Navy
- In office 17 July 1944 – 22 July 1944
- Prime Minister: Hideki Tojo
- Preceded by: Shigetarō Shimada
- Succeeded by: Mitsumasa Yonai

Member of the Supreme War Council
- In office 1 May 1945 – 15 October 1945
- Monarch: Hirohito
- In office 22 July 1944 – 2 August 1944
- Monarch: Hirohito
- In office 9 August 1943 – 20 October 1943
- Monarch: Hirohito

Personal details
- Born: 15 May 1885 Hioki, Kagoshima, Japan
- Died: 12 December 1973 (aged 88) Setagaya, Tokyo, Japan

Military service
- Allegiance: Empire of Japan
- Branch/service: Imperial Japanese Navy
- Years of service: 1907–1945
- Rank: Admiral
- Commands: Shirakumo, Chōgei, Haguro, Kaga, Naval Submarine School, 2nd Submarine Squadron, Naval Intelligence Bureau, 3rd China Expeditionary Fleet, Naval Councillor, Kure Naval District, Yokosuka Naval District, Maritime Escort Fleet
- Battles/wars: World War II

Naokuni Nomura (野村 直邦, Nomura Naokuni; 15 May 1885 – 12 December 1973) was an admiral in the Imperial Japanese Navy, and briefly served as Navy Minister in the 1940s.

== Biography ==
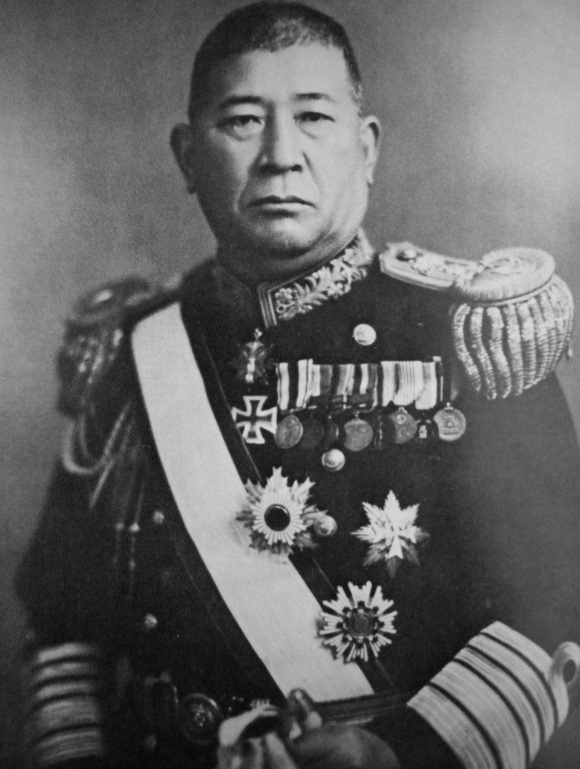
Admiral Nomura Naokuni (1944-45)

Nomura was born in Hioki, Kagoshima Prefecture. He graduated from the 35th class of the Imperial Japanese Naval Academy on 20 November 1907, ranked 43rd out of 172 cadets. He served his midshipman tour on the cruisers Itsukushima and Kashima. After commissioning to ensign on 25 December 1908, he was assigned to the destroyers Yayoi and Kamikaze. After completing naval artillery and basic torpedo training, he was assigned to the battleship Aki, and was promoted to sub-lieutenant on 1 December 1910.

Nomura subsequently served on a large number of vessels in the early Japanese navy, including the gunboat Tatsuta, cruiser Chiyoda, the gunboat Manshu and cruiser Aso.

Promoted to lieutenant on 1 December 1913, he was assigned to the destroyer Yayoi, followed by the destroyers Kashiwa, and his first command, the destroyer Shirakumo. Nomura was promoted to lieutenant commander on 1 December 1919. He graduated from the Naval Staff College with honors in 1920. He subsequently served in a number of staff positions, including that of naval attaché to Germany from August 1922 to September 1924. After his return to Japan, he was promoted to commander on 1 December 1924.

In April 1927, Nomura was part of the Japanese delegation to the Geneva Naval Conference. He became a captain on 10 December 1928, and assumed command of the submarine tender Chōgei in December 1928. Nomura visited Germany again during most of 1929, and was part of the Japanese delegation to the London Naval Treaty talks. After his return to Japan, he assumed command of the cruiser Haguro, followed by the aircraft carrier Kaga from February 1932-October 1933. In 1934, he was Commandant of the Submarine School.

Nomura was promoted to rear admiral on 15 November 1934. He served in numerous staff positions within the Imperial Japanese Navy General Staff, including head of Naval Intelligence in 1937. He was promoted to vice admiral on 15 November 1938. He served as commander in chief of the 3rd Fleet from November 1939 to September 1940.

Nomura was sent as naval liaison to Europe as part of Japan's participation in the Tripartite Pact from November 1940 to August 1943, and was stationed in Berlin as a naval attaché. During his time in Germany, he was active in attempting to procure the latest in military technology for Japan, especially developments pertaining to submarines and aircraft. He returned to Japan on the U-boat U-511, which was presented to Japan by Adolf Hitler and commissioned into the Imperial Japanese Navy as the Ro-500.

After his return to Japan, Nomura was briefly commander in chief of the Kure Naval District. On 1 March 1944, he was promoted to admiral.

He served as Naval Minister in the cabinet of Prime Minister Hideki Tōjō for only five days, 17–22 July 1944.

In the final stages of the Pacific War, he served as commander in chief of the Yokosuka Naval District and of the Maritime Escort Fleet. He entered the reserves on 15 October 1945 and died at the age of 88 in 1973.

Nomura was the center of a controversy in 1971, when he headed a group of Japanese war veterans in an attempt to recover the destroyer Yukikaze after it had been sold for scrap by the Republic of China Navy. He only managed to recover the steering wheel.

== Bibliography ==
- Billings, Richard N. (2006). Battleground Atlantic: How the Sinking of a Single Japanese Submarine Assuredthe Outcome of World War II. NAL. ISBN 0-451-21766-7.
- Boyd, Carl (2002). Hitler's Japanese Confidant: General Oshima Hiroshi and Magic Intelligence, 1941–1945. University Press of Kansas. ISBN 0-7006-1189-4.
- Toland, John (1992). The Rising Sun: The Decline and Fall of the Japanese Empire, 1936–1945. Modern Library. ISBN 0-8129-6858-1.
- Zacharias, Ellis M. (2003). Secret Missions: The Story of an Intelligence Officer. Naval Institute Press. ISBN 1-59114-999-1.

Military offices
Preceded by Kuragano Akira	Chōgei; Commanding Officer; 10 December 1928 - 1 May 1929	Succeeded by Wada Susumu
Preceded by Kobayashi Sōnosuke	Haguro; Commanding Officer; 10 October 1931 - 14 February 1933	Succeeded by Morimoto Makoto
Preceded by Hara Gorō	Kaga; Commanding Officer; 14 February 1933 - 20 October 1933	Succeeded by Kondō Eijirō
Preceded by Kondō Nobutake	Combined Fleet & 1st Fleet; Chief-of-staff; 15 November 1935 - 16 November 1936	Succeeded by Iwashita Yasutarō
Preceded by Fleet reorganized from 4th Fleet; Hibino Masaharu	3rd China Expeditionary Fleet; Commander-in-chief; 15 November 1939 - 30 September 1940	Succeeded by Mitsumi Shimizu
Preceded by Nagumo Chūichi	Kure Naval District; Commander-in-chief; 20 October 1943 - 17 July 1944	Succeeded by Sawamoto Yorio
Political offices
Preceded by Shimada Shigetarō	Minister of the Navy; 17 July 1944 – 22 July 1944	Succeeded by Yonai Mitsumasa
Military offices
Preceded by Oikawa Koshirō	Escort Fleet; Commander-in-chief; 2 August 1944 - 1 May 1945	Fleet Dissolved
Preceded by Yoshida Zengo	Yokosuka Naval District; Commander-in-chief; 2 August 1944 - 15 September 1944	Succeeded by Tsukahara Nishizō
