= Japanese destroyer Shirakumo (1901) =

Shirakumo-class destroyer

Coordinates: 32.837°N 132.130°E

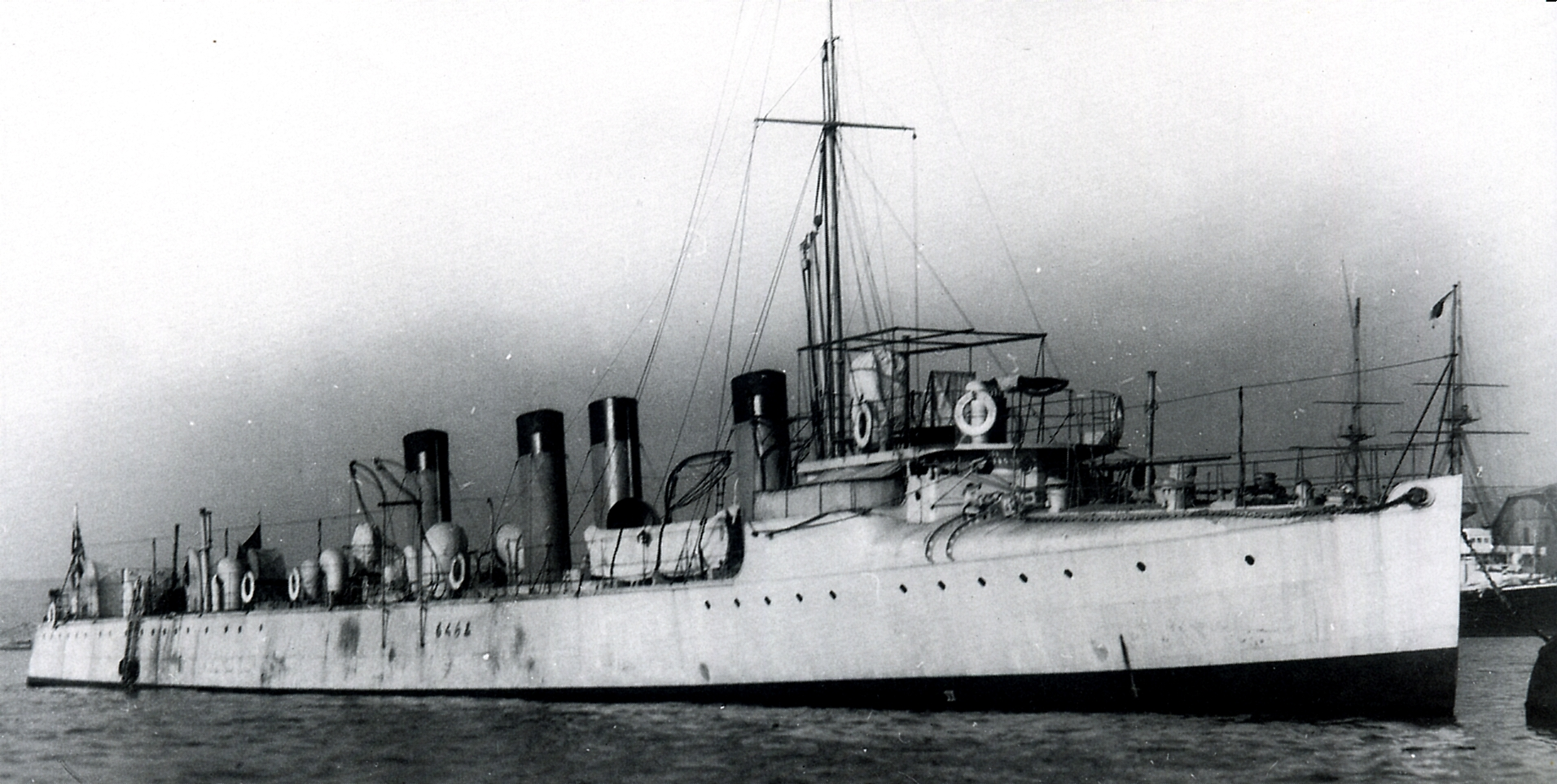
- Shirakumo upon commissioning in England in 1902.

History

Empire of Japan
- Name: Shirakumo
- Namesake: 白雲 ("White Cloud")
- Ordered: 1900
- Builder: John I. Thornycroft & Company, Chiswick, England
- Yard number: Destroyer No. 15
- Laid down: 1 February 1901
- Launched: 1 October 1901
- Completed: 13 February 1902
- Commissioned: 13 February 1902
- Reclassified: Third-class destroyer 28 August 1912; Special-duty vessel (second-class minesweeper) 1 April 1922; Utility vessel (accommodation ship) 1 April 1923
- Stricken: 1 April 1923
- Fate: Sunk as target 21 July 1925

General characteristics
- Type: Destroyer
- Displacement: 322 tons normal, 432 tons full load
- Length: 215 ft 9 in (65.76 m) waterline; 216 ft 9 in (66.07 m) overall
- Beam: 20 ft 9 in (6.32 m)
- Draught: 8 ft 3 in (2.51 m)
- Depth: 13 ft 9 in (4.19 m)
- Propulsion: 2-shaft reciprocating engines, 4 boilers, engine output 7,000 hp (5,200 kW)
- Speed: 31 knots (57 km/h; 36 mph)
- Complement: 62
- Armament: 1 x QF 12 pounder 12 cwt naval gun; 5 × QF 6 pounder (57 mm) guns; 2 × 450 mm (18 in) torpedoes

Service record
- Operations: Russo-Japanese War; Battle of Port Arthur; Battle of the Yellow Sea; Battle of Tsushima; World War I; Battle of Tsingtao

Shirakumo (白雲, "White Cloud") was the lead ship of two Shirakumo-class destroyers built for the Imperial Japanese Navy in the early 1900s. During the Russo-Japanese War (1904–1905), she took part in the Battle of Port Arthur in February 1904, the Battle of the Yellow Sea in August 1904, and the Battle of Tsushima in May 1905. During World War I (1914–1918), she participated in the Battle of Tsingtao in 1914.

== Construction and commissioning ==
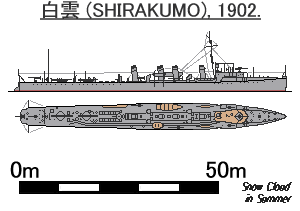
Line drawing of Shirakumo.

Authorized under the 1900 naval program, Shirakumo was laid down on 1 February 1901 as Destroyer No. 15 by John I. Thornycroft & Company at Chiswick, England. Launched on 1 October 1901 and named Shirakumo, she was completed on 13 February 1902 and commissioned the same day.

== Service history ==
Shirakumo departed England on 27 February 1902 to make her delivery voyage to Japan. She completed it with her arrival at Kure on 30 May 1902.

When the Russo-Japanese War broke out on 8 February 1904, Shirakumo was part of the 1st Destroyer Division of the 1st Fleet. The war began that evening with the Battle of Port Arthur, a Japanese surprise attack on Imperial Russian Navy warships anchored in the outer roadstead of the Russian naval base at Port Arthur, China. Ten Japanese destroyers of the 1st, 2nd, and 3rd Destroyer Divisions made a torpedo attack in three waves, with the four destroyers of the 1st Destroyer Division (Akatsuki, Asashio, Kasumi, and Shirakumo) and Ikazuchi of the 2nd Destroyer Division constituting the first wave. They closed to about 650 yards (590 m) from the Russian ships and fired nine torpedoes. One of Kasumi′s torpedoes hit the Russian protected cruiser Pallada.

As the Russo-Japanese War continued, Shirakumo took part in the Battle of the Yellow Sea on 10 August 1904. After transferring to the 4th Destroyer Division in the 2nd Fleet, she participated in the Battle of Tsushima on 27–28 May 1905. Responding to a signal from the unprotected cruiser Chihaya on the afternoon of 27 May, the 4th Destroyer Division (Asagiri, Asashio, Murasame, and Shirakumo) mounted a torpedo attack against the damaged Russian battleship Knyaz Suvorov. Although Asagiri, Asashio, and Murasame launched their torpedoes at ranges of from 800 metres (870 yd) down to 300 metres (330 yd) and Murasame scored an apparent hit that caused Knyaz Suvorov to heel 10 degrees, Shirakumo did not fire, finding that Knyaz Suvorov had lost all steaming power and come to a stop before she could achieve a firing position. Knyaz Suvorov later sank.

Shirakumo was reclassified as a third-class destroyer on 28 August 1912.

After Japan entered World War I in August 1914, Shirakumo took part in the Siege of Tsingtao in 1914.

On 1 April 1922, Shirakumo was reclassified as a "special-duty vessel" for use as a second-class minesweeper. On 1 April 1923, she was stricken from the naval register and reclassified as a utility vessel for use as an accommodation ship.

Shirakumo was sunk as a target in the Bungo Channel off Himeshima on 21 July 1925.

== Commanding officers ==
- Lieutenant Commander Kota Hazama 26 June 1901 – 22 October 1901 (pre-commissioning)
- Lieutenant Commander Kota Hazama 22 October 1901 – unknown
- Lieutenant Commander Masayuki Kamada 12 December 1905 – 14 March 1906
- Lieutenant Kanzo Tsunoda 14 March 1906 – 1 April 1906
- Lieutenant Commander Yoshihiro Morimoto 1 April 1906 – 13 September 1906
- Lieutenant Yahei Nakahara 13 September 1906 -– 12 November 1906
- Lieutenant Hanjiro Sonoda 12 November 1906 – 17 May 1907
- Lieutenant Teruichi Akiyoshi 17 May 1907 – 20 April 1908
- Lieutenant Yasuhiro Yamamoto 20 April 1908 – 25 September 1908
- Lieutenant Shoichi Akiyoshi 25 September 1908 – 20 February 1909
- Lieutenant Yoshio Yamanaka 20 February 1909 – 1 April 1910
- Lieutenant Nobuyuki Kabayama 1 April 1910 – 1 December 1910
- Lieutenant Commander Tomomasa Ohashi 1 December 1910 – 20 December 1910
- Lieutenant Commander 20 December 1910 – 28 April 1911
- Lieutenant Goto Akira 28 April 1911 – 24 May 1913
- Lieutenant Meijiro Tate 24 May 1913 - 1 December 1913
- Lieutenant Commander Tadashi Takeuchi 1 December 1913 – unknown
- Lieutenant Koro Ogawa Unknown – 1 December 1916
- Lieutenant Nomura Jinzo (Naokuni) 1 December 1916 – 1 December 1917
- Lieutenant Ei Kashiwagi 1 December 1917 – 21 February 1920
- Lieutenant Fukashi Yamashita 21 February 1920 – 20 January 1921
- Lieutenant Tetsu Sano 20 January 1921 – 1 December 1921
- Lieutenant Miyazaki Taira 1 December 1921 – unknown
