= Akatsuki-class destroyer =

Akatsuki-class destroyer may refer to:

- Akatsuki-class destroyer (1901), a class of two torpedo boat destroyers of the Imperial Japanese Navy during the Russo-Japanese War
- Akatsuki-class destroyer (1931), a subclass of Fubuki-class destroyer, a class of four destroyers of the Imperial Japanese Navy during World War II

Note: In 1904, during the Russo-Japanese War, Japan captured the Imperial Russian Navy destroyer Reshitelny. She was recommissioned in the Imperial Japanese Navy in 1905 as Akatsuki, becoming its own class. However, in 1906, the ship was renamed Yamabiko, the class again adopted the name of its lead (and only) ship.

== See also ==
- Akatsuki (disambiguation)
- Japanese destroyer Akatsuki
