= Russian destroyer Reshitel'nyi =

Sokol-class destroyer

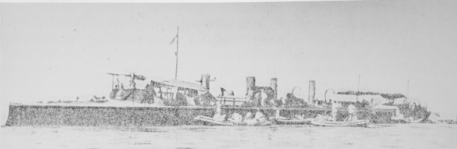
- Reshitelnyi at Chefoo, China, sometime in 1903 or 1904.

History

Russian Empire
- Name: Kondor
- Namesake: "Condor"
- Builder: Nevsky Works, Igorsky Arsenal, or Izhora Works, Saint Petersburg, Russia (see text)
- Laid down: 1897 or 1900 (see text)
- Launched: 26 July [O.S. 13 July] 1901
- Renamed: Baklan 3 August [O.S. 21 July] 1901
- Namesake: Cormorant
- Renamed: Reshitel‘nyi 22 March [O.S. 9 March] 1902
- Namesake: Resolute
- Commissioned: 27 June [O.S. 14 June] 1903
- Captured: By the Empire of Japan 12 August [O.S. 30 July] 1904

Empire of Japan
- Name: Akatsuki
- Namesake: 暁 ("Daybreak")
- Acquired: 12 August 1904
- Renamed: Yamabiko (or Yamahiko) 19 October 1905
- Namesake: 山彦 ("Mountain Echo")
- Reclassified: Third-class destroyer 28 August 1912
- Stricken: 1 April 1917
- Renamed: Yamabiko Maru (山彦丸) 1 April 1917
- Reclassified: "General service ship" or "miscellaneous utility ship" (target ship) 1 April 1917
- Fate: Scrapped 1918 or discarded 1919 (see text)

General characteristics
- Type: Sokol-class destroyer
- Displacement: 258 long tons (262 t)
- Length: 57.91 m (190 ft 0 in)
- Beam: 5.67 m (18 ft 7 in)
- Draught: 2.3 m (7 ft 7 in)
- Propulsion: 2 x vertical triple expansion steam engines, 8 x Yarrow boilers, 3,800 hp (2,834 kW), 2 shafts, 60 tons coal
- Speed: 25.75 knots (47.69 km/h; 29.63 mph)
- Range: 660 nautical miles (1,200 km; 760 mi)
- Complement: 52 (4 officers, 48 enlisted men)
- Armament: 1 × 75 mm gun; 3 × 47 mm guns; 2 × single 381 mm (15 in) torpedo tubes, 2 x torpedoes (as built); 2 x single 450 mm (18 in) torpedo tubes, 2 x torpedoes (1905)

Service record (Imperial Russian Navy)
- Operations: Russo-Japanese War; Battle of Port Arthur

Service record (Imperial Japanese Navy)
- Operations: Russo-Japanese War; Battle of Tsushima; World War I

Reshitel‘nyi (Решительный, English "Resolute") was a Sokol-class destroyer built for the Imperial Russian Navy at the beginning of the 20th century. She served in the Russo-Japanese War (1904–1905), seeing action in the Battle of Port Arthur before the Imperial Japanese Navy captured her in 1904. Renamed Akatsuki (暁 ("Daybreak") in Japanese service, she took part in the Battle of Tsushima in 1905. She was renamed Yamabiko 山彦 ("Mountain Echo"), also transliterated as Yamahiko, in 1905 after the conclusion of the war and remained in Japanese service until 1917.

== Construction and commissioning ==
Laid down in either 1897 or 1900 (sources disagree) in Saint Petersburg, Russia, at the Nevsky Works, Igorsky Arsenal, or Izhora Works (sources disagree), Reshitel‘nyi was shipped in pieces to the Imperial Russian Navy base at Port Arthur, China, and assembled there. Launched at Port Arthur on 26 July [O.S. 13 July] 1901 with the name Kondor (Кондор, English "Condor"), she was renamed Baklan (Баклан, English "Cormorant") on 3 August [O.S. 21 July] 1901, and she completed fitting out during 1902. She was renamed Reshitel‘nyi on 22 March [O.S. 9 March] 1902, and her first commanding officer, Lieutenant Alexander Alekseevich Korniliev, took command on 25 May [O.S. 12 May] 1903. She was commissioned at Port Arthur on 27 June [O.S. 14 June] 1903.

== Service history ==
=== Imperial Russian Navy ===
Upon commissioning, Reshitel‘nyi was assigned to the 2nd Destroyer Detachment in the First Pacific Squadron. She took part in the squadron's operations during the remainder of 1903. On 25 January [O.S. 12 January] 1904, Korniliev was transferred to the Baltic Fleet, and Captain 2nd rank Fedor Emilievich Bosse was ordered to relieve him as commanding officer of Reshitel‘nyi, However, Korniliev remained in command for several more weeks pending Bosse's arrival at Port Arthur.

Korniliev thus was still in command of Reshitel‘nyi when the Russo-Japanese War began on the evening of 8 February [O.S. 26 January] 1904 with the Battle of Port Arthur, a surprise Imperial Japanese Navy attack on Russian ships in the outer roadstead at Port Arthur. At dawn on 9 February [O.S. 27 January] 1904, two pairs of Russian destroyers – one of them consisting of Reshitel‘nyi and her sister ship Steregushchiy — sortied to attack the Japanese ships off Port Arthur. The Japanese opened gunfire on the Russian destroyers, preventing them from getting close enough to launch torpedoes, and they received orders to return to Port Arthur. Several Japanese shells struck Steregushchiy, but Reshitel‘nyi received no hits, although near-misses wounded several members of her crew including Korniliev, who suffered a severe concussion. A few days after the battle, Korniliev also developed a case of pneumonia, and on 14 February [O.S. 1 February] 1904, with his condition worsening, he was detached from Reshitel‘nyi and sent via ambulance train to Russia for treatment. En route, he was diagnosed with tuberculosis and hospitalized at Harbin, China, where he died on 3 May [O.S. 20 April] 1904.

Meanwhile, Bosse arrived in Port Arthur on 27 February [O.S. 14 February] 1904 to take command of Reshitel‘nyi. On the night of 9–10 March [O.S. 25–26 February] 1904, the 2nd Destroyer Detachment, consisting of Reshitel‘nyi and Steregushchiy, conducted a reconnaissance of either the Elliot Islands in the Yellow Sea or the inner harbor at Thornton Haven on the coast of China, or perhaps both (sources are unclear). While returning to Port Arthur in the predawn hours of 10 March [O.S. 26 February] 1904, they had to alter course farther out to sea to avoid a Japanese cruiser and a force of Japanese destroyers. As they approached Port Arthur from the south-southeast they encountered another Japanese force consisting of the protected cruiser Chitose and destroyers Akebono, Sazanami, Shinonome, and Usugumo. As the Japanese moved to cut them off from Port Arthur, Reshitel‘nyi and Steregushchiy turned to starboard and made for the shelter of Russian minefields off Dalniy. With superior speed, the Japanese destroyers closed to a range of 300 metres (330 yd), and the two sides opened gunfire on one another. The Russians scored a number of hits on the Japanese ships, but Steregushchiy suffered damage that caused her speed to drop off significantly. Aboard Reshitel‘nyi, Bosse was wounded, forcing her chief engineer to take command, and a shell hit knocked out one of her boilers, but she managed to keep her speed up and reach waters within range of Russian coastal artillery at daybreak. As Reshitel‘nyi again altered course toward Port Arthur, the coastal artillery opened fire on the Japanese and discouraged them from continuing the chase. Instead, the Japanese closed with Steregushchiy and opened an overwhelming fire on her in broad daylight, reducing her to a motionless wreck with almost her entire crew dead or dying. Steregushchiy struck her colors to surrender, but her crew had opened her Kingston valves to scuttle her, and as the Japanese tried to take possession of her, two members of her crew locked themselves in her engine room to ensure the valves stayed open, sacrificing their lives to ensure that she sank. A Japanese attempt to tow Steregushchiy to port failed, and she sank with the loss of all hands. Meanwhile, Reshitel‘nyi reached safety at Port Arthur.

Illustration of the Japanese seizure of Reshitelnyi at Chefoo, China, from Le Petit Parisien, 28 August 1904.

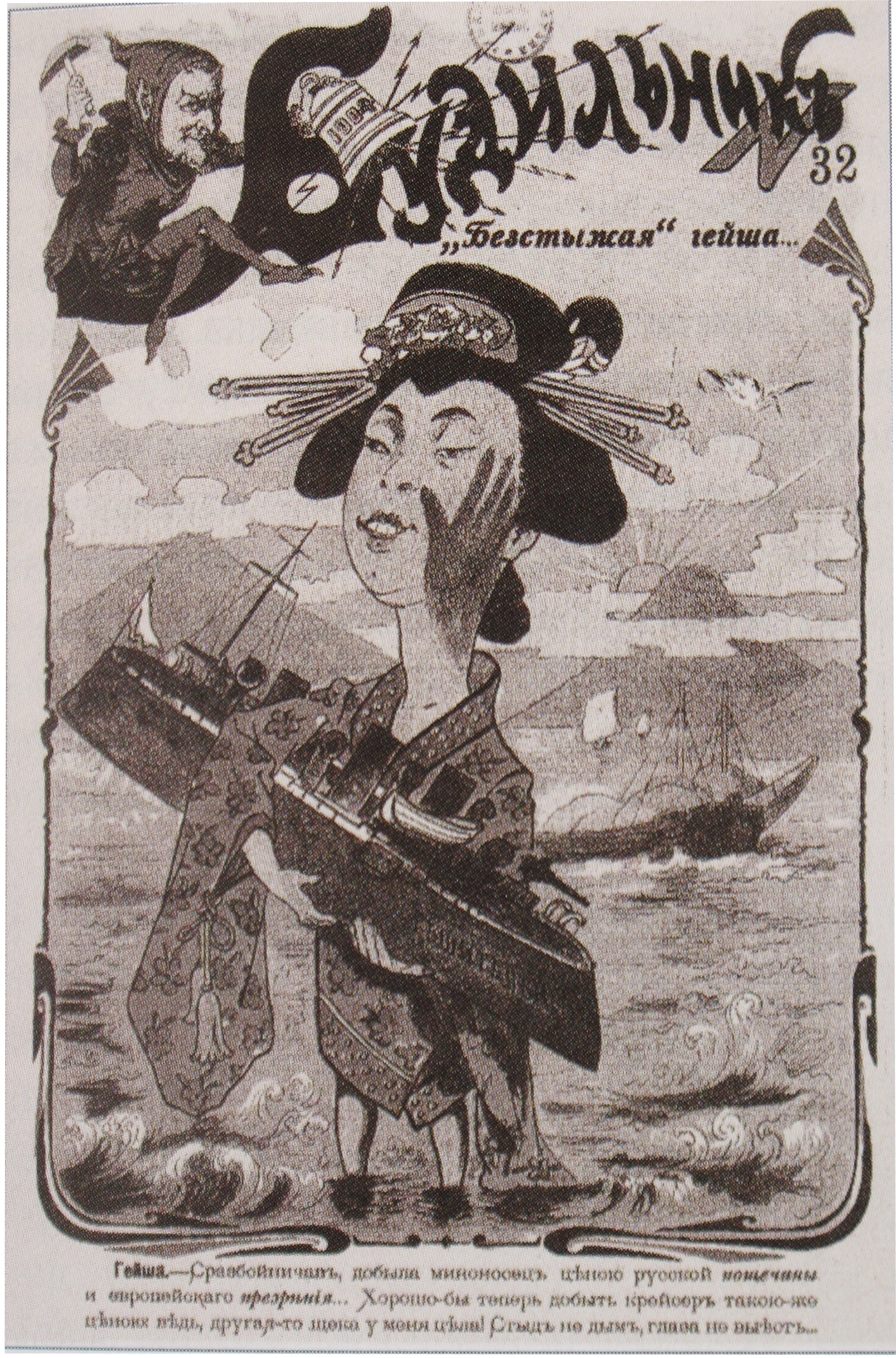
Illustration of a "shameless geisha" holding Reshitel‘nyi after Japan captured the destroyer in a neutral port, from the Russian magazine Budil'nik ("Alarm Clock"), No. 32, 1904.

The Japanese maintained a blockade of Port Arthur over the next several months. On the morning of 10 August [O.S. 28 July] 1904, the Russian squadron at Port Arthur put to sea in an attempt to reach Vladivostok. In the Battle of the Yellow Sea that day, the Russians suffered a defeat in which the squadron commander, Rear Admiral Wilgelm Vitgeft, was killed. In the battle's aftermath, the Russian squadron scattered, some ships returning to Port Arthur and others trying to reach various other ports in East Asia with Japanese forces in pursuit. Reshitel‘nyi, now under the command of Lieutenant Mikhail Sergeevich Roschakovsky, put to sea from Port Arthur as soon as darkness fell on 10 August [O.S. 28 July] 1904 carrying a dispatch about Vitgeft's decision to attempt to reach Vladivostok. She ran the Japanese blockade and made for Chefoo, China, where the dispatch could be sent to Russian authorities by telegraph. Due to her poor material condition, her crew had orders not to attempt to return to Port Arthur but rather to disarm her and allow Chinese authorities to intern her at Chefoo in accordance with international law and China's status as a neutral country. Upon her arrival at Chefoo on 11 August [O.S. 29 July] 1904, Roschakovsky contacted the local Chinese authorities to make arrangements for his ship's internment.

The Japanese quickly learned of Reshitel‘nyi′s presence at Chefoo and issued orders to Japanese forces to disregard any disarmament and either capture or sink her. As Reshitel‘nyi′s crew was disarming her, the Japanese destroyers Asashio and Kasumi entered the port. According to the Russian account of the ensuing incident, a Japanese boarding party went aboard Reshitel‘nyi at 03:00 on 12 August [O.S. 30 July] 1904, and the officer commanding the boarding party demanded that Reshitel‘nyi either surrender or put to sea within two hours and fight the Japanese destroyers in international waters. Roschakovsky rejected the Japanese demands, arguing that he was disarming his ship for internment in accordance with international law, that the Japanese demands violated Chinese neutrality, and that in any event Reshitel‘nyi could not get underway due to engine problems. The Japanese officer countered that Chinese neutrality did not protect Reshitel‘nyi, claiming that the Battle of the Yellow Sea had not yet ended because Russian ships still were in the process of fleeing the engagement and that Japan had a right to hot pursuit of Russian ships even in neutral waters under those circumstances. As the argument continued, the Japanese attempted to hoist their flag aboard Reshitel‘nyi, and Roschakovsky threw the Japanese officer overboard. Roschakovsky was dragged over the side as well, and the Japanese fired shots at him in the water as he attempted to get back aboard his ship. Hand-to-hand combat between Russian and Japanese sailors ensued while Reshitel‘nyi′s crew set off an explosive charge in an attempt to destroy her by detonating her ammunition magazine, but the magazine did not explode and the Japanese succeeded in capturing her after about half the Russian crew and half the Japanese boarding party had been thrown overboard. During the skirmish, two Russians were killed and four, including Roschakovsky, were wounded, while the Japanese lost two men killed and 11 wounded. The men in the water eventually swam ashore, and the Japanese, ignoring the protests of the senior Imperial Chinese Navy officer at Chefoo, towed Reshitel‘nyi to Dalniy as a prize.

The Japanese offered a different narrative of the incident. They claimed that Reshitel‘nyi was not being disarmed but rather was preparing to put to sea, that they had been invited to come aboard to inspect her, and that when they arrived to conduct the inspection they were insulted, thrown into the water, and endangered by an explosion. However, the local Chinese authorities backed the Russian version of events and the press in the United States criticized the Japanese action.

=== Imperial Japanese Navy ===
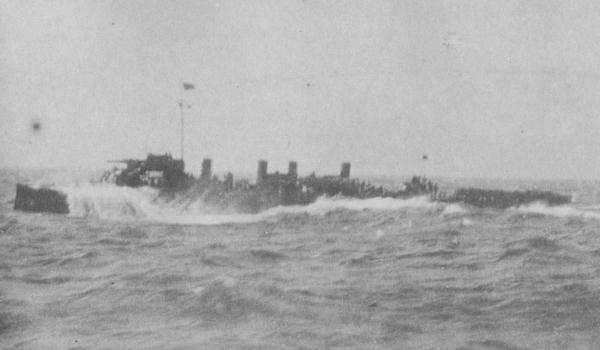
Akatsuki during the Battle of Tsushima on 28 May 1905

The Japanese repaired Reshitel‘nyi and replaced her 381-millimetre (15 in) torpedo tubes with 450-millimetre (18 in) tubes, completing the work on 17 January 1905 and renaming her Akatsuki that day, part of their effort to conceal the loss of the first Akatsuki, an Akatsuki-class destroyer which had struck a mine and sunk on 17 May 1904. As the second Akatsuki, the captured destroyer began operations with the Japanese fleet in the ongoing war with Russia as part of the 1st Destroyer Division. She participated in the Battle of Tsushima in late May 1905, during which she took part in a large torpedo attack against the Russian squadron on the evening of 27 May 1905. Bad weather interfered with the attack and much confusion occurred, disorganizing the attacking Japanese destroyers and torpedo boats. As a result, Akatsuki suddenly emerged from the darkness at high speed on the beam of the Japanese 1st Torpedo Boat Division and charged through the torpedo boat formation, scattering the torpedo boats as they took evasive action. The lead torpedo boat, No. 69, narrowly avoided colliding with Akatsuki but only by putting her helm so hard over that she overstressed and ruptured her hull, and she sank two hours later.

On 14 June 1905, a Combined Fleet reorganization placed the second Akatsuki in the 3rd Squadron's 6th Destroyer Division. The war ended in September 1905, and in its immediate aftermath the Japanese again renamed the former Russian destroyer, giving her the name Yamabiko, also transliterated as Yamahiko, on 19 October 1905. They had finally announced the loss of the first Akatsuki on 1 June 1905 after their decisive victory in the Battle of Tsushima, and they struck the first Akatsuki from the navy list on the same day they gave the second Akatsuki the new name Yamabiko.

The press in Singapore reported on 18 April 1906 that Yamabiko had suffered from continual outbreaks of typhus among her crew ever since her capture from the Russians in August 1904 and that she had been quarantined at Nagahama, Japan, in an effort to eradicate the disease once and for all; the Japanese expressed a belief that Russian sailors had introduced typhus to the destroyer during her Russian service. Yamabiko was reclassified as a third-class destroyer on 28 August 1912.

Yamabiko was still in service when Japan's participation in World War I began in August 1914. Before the end of the war, however, she was stricken from the navy list on 1 April 1917 due to age. That day, she was reclassified as a "general service ship" or "miscellaneous utility ship," renamed Yamabiko Maru, and designated for use as a target ship. She underwent conversion at the Yokosuka Naval Arsenal in Yokosuka, Japan, between 3 May and 15 June 1917 for use as a torpedo target. Stripping her of useful materials began on 30 November 1917. Sources disagree on her fate, claiming both that she was scrapped in 1918 and discarded in 1919.
