= Japanese destroyer Kasumi (1902) =

Akatsuki-class destroyer

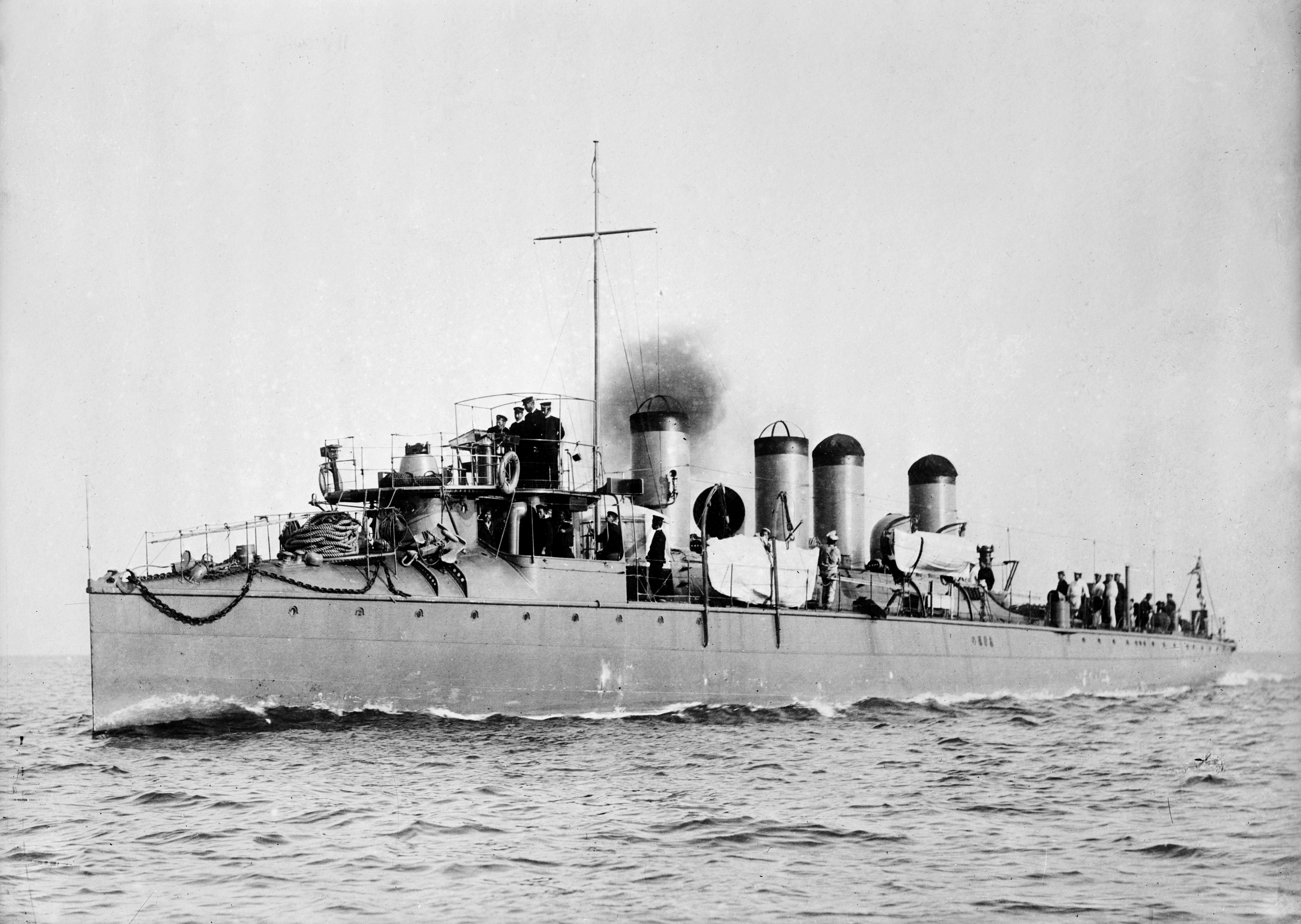

History

Empire of Japan
- Name: Kasumi
- Namesake: 霞 (Mist)
- Ordered: 1900
- Builder: Yarrow & Company, Cubitt Town, London, England
- Yard number: Destroyer No. 14
- Laid down: 1 February 1901
- Launched: 23 January 1902
- Completed: 14 February 1902
- Commissioned: 14 February 1902
- Reclassified: Third-class destroyer 28 August 1912
- Stricken: 1 April 1913
- Renamed: Kasumi Maru 23 August 1913; Kasumi 1 July 1920
- Reclassified: "Miscellaneous ship" (cargo ship, minesweeper, target ship) 23 August 1913
- Fate: Scrapped

General characteristics
- Type: Akatsuki-class destroyer
- Displacement: 363 long tons (369 t) normal, 415 long tons (422 t) full load
- Length: 67.29 m (220.8 ft) pp, 68.45 m (224.6 ft) overall
- Beam: 6.28 m (20.6 ft)
- Draught: 1.73 m (5.7 ft)
- Propulsion: 2-shaft reciprocating, 4 Yarrow boilers, 6,000 ihp (4,500 kW)
- Speed: 30 knots (56 km/h)
- Complement: 62
- Armament: 1 × QF 12 pounder 12 cwt naval gun; 5 × QF 6 pounder Hotchkiss; 2 × 450 mm (18 in) torpedoes

Service record
- Operations: Russo-Japanese War; Battle of Port Arthur; Battle of Tsushima; World War I; Battle of Tsingtao

Kasumi (霞, Mist) was one of two Akatsuki-class destroyers, built for the Imperial Japanese Navy in the early 1900s. During the Russo-Japanese War (1904–1905), she took part in the Battle of Port Arthur in February 1904, the capture of the Imperial Russian Navy destroyer Reshitel'nyi in August 1904, and the Battle of Tsushima in May 1905. She also participated in the Battle of Tsingtao in 1914 during World War I (1914–1918).

== Construction and commissioning ==
Authorized under the 1900 naval program, Kasumi was laid down as Destroyer No. 14 on 1 February 1901 by Yarrow & Company at Cubitt Town in London, England. Launched on 23 January 1902 and named Kasumi, she was completed on 14 February 1902 and commissioned the same day.

== Service history ==
Kasumi departed England on 10 March 1902 to make her delivery voyage to Japan. She completed it with her arrival at Yokosuka on 15 June 1902.

When the Russo-Japanese War broke out on 8 February 1904, Kasumi was part of the 1st Destroyer Division of the 1st Fleet. The war began that evening with the Battle of Port Arthur, a Japanese surprise attack on Imperial Russian Navy warships anchored in the outer roadstead of the Russian naval base at Port Arthur, China. Ten Japanese destroyers of the 1st, 2nd, and 3rd Destroyer Divisions made a torpedo attack in three waves, with the four destroyers of the 1st Destroyer Division (Akatsuki, Asashio, Kasumi, and Shirakumo) and Ikazuchi of the 2nd Destroyer Division constituting the first wave. They closed to about 650 yards (590 m) from the Russian ships and fired nine torpedoes. One of Kasumi's torpedoes hit the Russian protected cruiser Pallada.

The Japanese maintained a blockade of Port Arthur over the next several months. On the morning of 10 August 1904, the Russian squadron at Port Arthur put to sea in an attempt to reach Vladivostok. In the Battle of the Yellow Sea that day, the Russians suffered a defeat in which the squadron commander, Rear Admiral Wilgelm Vitgeft, was killed. In the battle's aftermath, the Russian squadron scattered, some ships returning to Port Arthur and others trying to reach various other ports in East Asia with Japanese forces in pursuit. The Russian destroyer Reshitel'nyi put to sea from Port Arthur as soon as darkness fell on 10 August carrying a dispatch about Vitgeft's decision to attempt to reach Vladivostok. She ran the Japanese blockade and made for Chefoo, China, where the dispatch could be sent to Russian authorities by telegraph. Due to Reshitel'nyi's poor material condition, her crew had orders not to attempt to return to Port Arthur but rather to disarm her and allow Chinese authorities to intern her at Chefoo in accordance with international law and China's status as a neutral country. Upon her arrival at Chefoo on 11 August 1904, her commanding officer, Lieutenant Mikhail Sergeevich Roschakovsky, contacted the local Chinese authorities to make arrangements for his ship's internment.

Illustration of the Japanese seizure of the Russian destroyer Reshitel'nyi at Chefoo, China, from Le Petit Parisien, 28 August 1904.

The Japanese quickly learned of Reshitel'nyi's presence at Chefoo and issued orders to Japanese forces to disregard any disarmament and either capture or sink her. As Reshitel'nyi's crew was disarming her, Kasumi and the Japanese destroyer Asashio entered the port. According to the Russian account of the ensuing incident, a Japanese boarding party from the destroyers went aboard Reshitel'nyi at 03:00 on 12 August, and the officer commanding the boarding party demanded that Reshitel'nyi either surrender or put to sea within two hours and fight the Japanese destroyers in international waters. Roschakovsky rejected the Japanese demands, arguing that he was disarming his ship for internment in accordance with international law, that the Japanese demands violated Chinese neutrality, and that in any event Reshitel'nyi could not get underway due to engine problems. The Japanese officer countered that Chinese neutrality did not protect Reshitel'nyi, claiming that the Battle of the Yellow Sea had not yet ended because Russian ships still were in the process of fleeing the engagement and that Japan had a right to hot pursuit of Russian ships even in neutral waters under those circumstances. As the argument continued, the Japanese attempted to hoist their flag aboard Reshitel'nyi, and Roschakovsky threw the Japanese officer overboard. Roschakovsky was dragged over the side as well, and the Japanese fired shots at him in the water as he attempted to get back aboard his ship. Hand-to-hand combat between Russian and Japanese sailors ensued while Reshitel'nyi's crew set off an explosive charge in an attempt to destroy her by detonating her ammunition magazine, but the magazine did not explode and the Japanese succeeded in capturing her after about half the Russian crew and half the Japanese boarding party had been thrown overboard. During the skirmish, two Russians were killed and four, including Roschakovsky, were wounded, while the Japanese lost two men killed and 11 wounded. The men in the water eventually swam ashore, and the Japanese, ignoring the protests of the senior Imperial Chinese Navy officer at Chefoo, towed Reshitel'nyi to Dalniy, China, as a prize.

The Japanese offered a different narrative of the incident. They claimed that Reshitel'nyi was not being disarmed but rather was preparing to put to sea, that they had been invited to come aboard to inspect her, and that when they arrived to conduct the inspection they were insulted, thrown into the water, and endangered by an explosion. However, the local Chinese authorities backed the Russian version of events and the press in the United States criticized the Japanese action.

On 10 May 1905, Kasumi was transferred to the 3rd Destroyer Division. She took part in the Battle of Tsushima on 27–28 May 1905.

Kasumi was stricken from the naval register on 1 April 1913. On 23 August 1913, she was reclassified as a "miscellaneous ship" for use as a general cargo ship and minesweeper and renamed Kasumi Maru. As such, she took part in the Battle of Tsingtao after Japan entered World War I in August 1914.

Later designated as a target ship, she was renamed Kasumi on 1 July 1920. She subsequently was scrapped.

== Commanding officers ==
- Lieutenant Commander Masatake Oshima 26 July 1901 – 13 February 1902 (pre-commissioning)
- Lieutenant Commander Masatake Oshima 13 February 1902 – 11 September 1904
- Lieutenant Commander Naosuke Shiraishi 11 September 1904 – 12 December 1905
- Lieutenant Iguchi Jiro 12 December 1905 – 25 January 1906
- Lieutenant Commander Tsunezo Aiba 25 January 1906 – 14 March 1906
- Lieutenant Yoshinojo Hiraoka 14 March 1906 – 1 April 1906
- Lieutenant Kanzo Tsunoda 1 April 1906 – 9 March 1907
- Lieutenant Hideaki Miura 9 March 1907 – 20 April 1908
- Lieutenant Shinichiro Abe 20 April 1908 – 25 September 1908
- Lieutenant Yoshizo Matsushita 25 September 1908 – 20 February 1909
- Lieutenant Tadatsugu Morita 20 February 1909 – 16 July 1910
- Lieutenant Masao Sugiura 16 July 1910 – 22 May 1912
- Lieutenant Tsuneo Abe 22 May 1912 – unknown
