= Shirakumo-class destroyer =

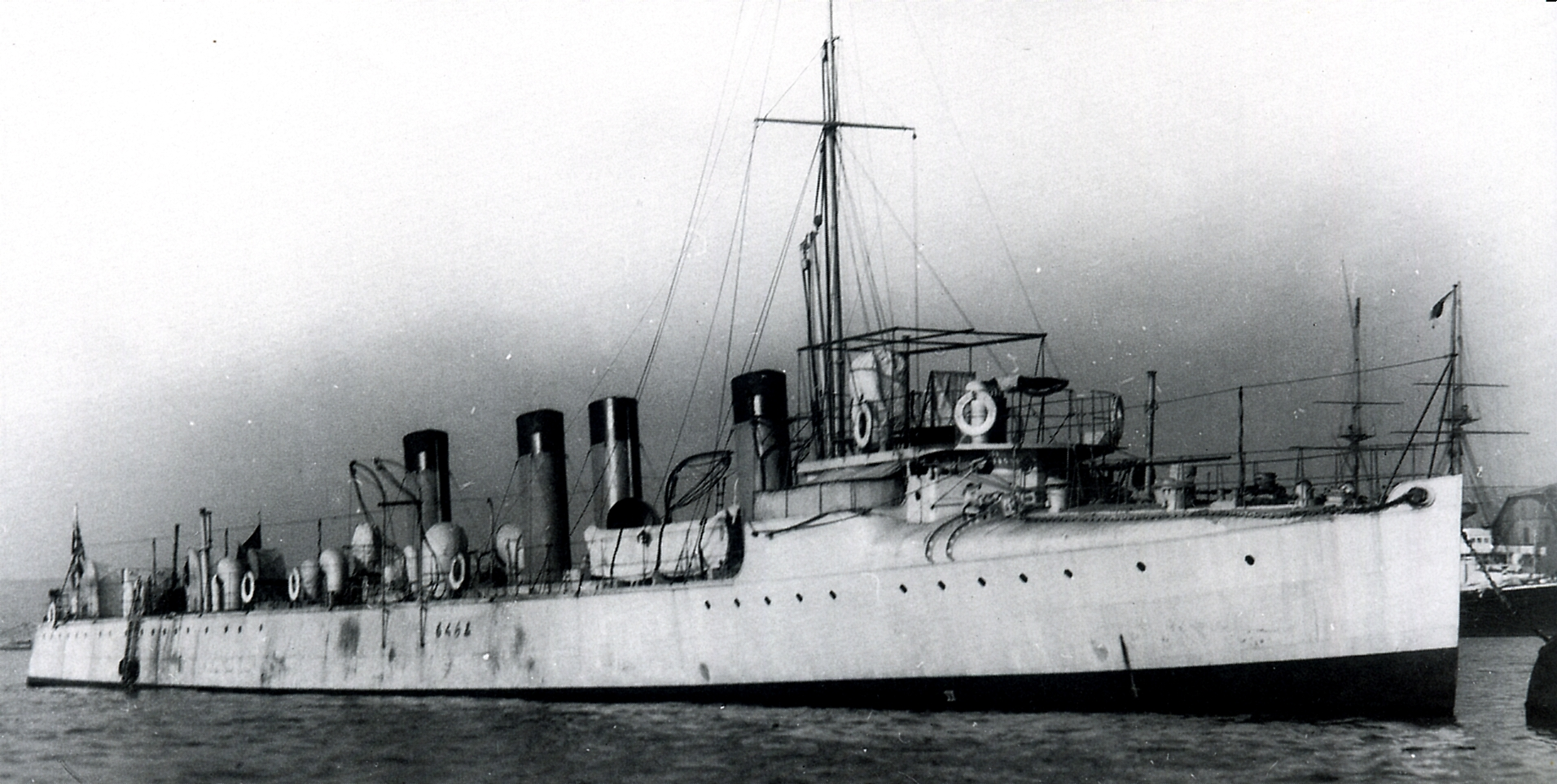
- Japanese destroyer Shirakumo during commissioning, England, 1902

Class overview
- Name: Shirakumo class
- Builders: John I. Thornycroft & Company Chiswick, England
- Operators: Imperial Japanese Navy
- Preceded by: Akatsuki class
- Succeeded by: Harusame class
- In commission: February 1902 – April 1923
- Completed: 2
- Retired: 2

General characteristics
- Type: Destroyer
- Displacement: 322 tons normal, 432 tons full load
- Length: 215 ft 9 in (65.76 m) waterline; 216 ft 9 in (66.07 m) overall
- Beam: 20 ft 9 in (6.32 m)
- Draught: 8 ft 3 in (2.51 m)
- Depth: 13 ft 9 in (4.19 m)
- Propulsion: 2-shaft reciprocating engines, 4 boilers, engine output 7,000 hp (5,200 kW)
- Speed: 31 knots (57 km/h; 36 mph)
- Complement: 62
- Armament: 1 x QF 12 pounder 12 cwt naval gun; 5 × QF 6 pounder (57 mm) guns; 2 × 450 mm (18 in) torpedoes

The Shirakumo-class destroyers (白雲型駆逐艦, Shirakumogata kuchikukan) was a class of two torpedo boat destroyers (TBDs) of the Imperial Japanese Navy, built in Britain in 1901–02.

== Background ==
The Shirakumo-class destroyers were ordered under the 1900 fiscal budget as a follow-on to the earlier Murakumo class. Both were ordered on 7 (or 16) November 1900 from the yard of John I. Thornycroft & Company in Chiswick, England.

== Design ==
Compared with the previous Murakumo class, the Shirakumo class was significantly larger in displacement with a somewhat more powerful engine. The main difference externally between the vessels was in the design of their rudders. With the previous class, the rudder was semi-balanced, and had a portion exposed above the waterline. This made the vessel vulnerable to disablement by stray gunfire.

The design of the three-boilered Murakumo-class destroyers had been similar to that of the two-funnel torpedo boat destroyers produced by Thornycroft for the Royal Navy; (from 1913 these were grouped as the D class), also known as the "Thirty Knotters". However the Shirakumo class had four boilers and four funnels, and was closer to the 'special' three-funnel destroyer Albatross built for the Royal Navy. Both vessels had a flush deck design with a distinctive "turtleback" forecastle that was intended to clear water from the bow during high speed navigation, but was poorly designed for high waves or bad weather. The bridge and forward gun platform were barely raised above the bow, resulting in a wet conning position. More than half of the small hull was occupied by the boilers and the engine room. With fuel and weaponry, there was little space left for crew quarters, although slightly more than in the Murakumo class.

All were powered by triple expansion steam engines for 7,000 shp (5,200 kW) and had coal-fired water-tube boilers. Armament was one QF 12 pounder 12 cwt gun on a bandstand on the forecastle, five QF 6 pounder Hotchkiss (two sited abreast the conning tower, two sited between the funnels and one on the quarterdeck) and 2 single tubes for 18-inch (460 mm) torpedoes.

== Operational history ==
Both Shirakumo-class destroyers arrived in Japan in time to be used in combat service during the Russo-Japanese War of 1904–1905 and were assigned to the 4th Destroyer Squadron under Admiral Dewa Shigeto. Both played an especially distinguished role in the crucial Battle of Tsushima.

On 28 August 1912, both vessels were re-classified as third-class destroyers and were removed from front-line combat service. They were converted to auxiliary minesweepers on 1 April 1922, but were used for only a year until converted to unarmed utility vessels.

== Ships ==
Kanji	Name	Builder	Laid down	Launched	Completed	Fate
白雲	Shirakumo "White Cloud"	Thornycroft, Chiswick, United Kingdom	1 February 1901	1 October 1901	13 February 1902	auxiliary minesweeper 1 April 1922; utility vessel 1 April 1923; sold 21 July 1925
朝潮	Asashio "Morning Tide"	Thornycroft, Chiswick, United Kingdom	3 April 1901	10 January 1902	4 May 1902	auxiliary minesweeper 1 April 1922, utility vessel 1 April 1923; sold 5 April 1926
