= Japanese destroyer Akatsuki (1901) =

Akatsuki-class destroyer

History

Empire of Japan
- Name: Akatsuki
- Namesake: 暁 ("Daybreak")
- Ordered: 1900
- Builder: Yarrow & Company, Cubitt Town, London, England
- Yard number: Torpedo Boat Destroyer No. 13
- Laid down: 10 December 1900
- Launched: 13 February 1901 or 13 November 1901 (see text)
- Completed: 14 December 1901
- Commissioned: 14 December 1901
- Fate: Sunk 17 May 1904
- Stricken: 19 October 1905

General characteristics
- Type: Akatsuki-class destroyer
- Displacement: 363 long tons (369 t) normal, 415 long tons (422 t) full load
- Length: 67.29 m (220.8 ft) pp, 68.45 m (224.6 ft) overall
- Beam: 6.28 m (20.6 ft)
- Draught: 1.73 m (5.7 ft)
- Propulsion: 2-shaft reciprocating, 4 Yarrow boilers, 6,000 ihp (4,500 kW)
- Speed: 30 knots (56 km/h)
- Complement: 62
- Armament: 1 × QF 12 pounder 12 cwt naval gun; 5 × QF 6 pounder Hotchkiss; 2 × 450 mm (18 in) torpedoes

Service record
- Operations: Russo-Japanese War; Battle of Port Arthur; Blockade of Port Arthur

Akatsuki (暁, "Daybreak") was the lead ship of two Akatsuki-class destroyers, built for the Imperial Japanese Navy in the early 1900s. Akatsuki took part in the Russo-Japanese War (1904–1905), during which she participated in the Battle of Port Arthur in February 1904, then struck a mine and sank in May 1904.

== Construction and commissioning ==
Authorized under the 1900 naval program, Akatsuki was laid down as Destroyer No. 13 on 10 December 1900 by Yarrow & Company at Cubitt Town in London, England. Launched on either 13 February 1901 or 13 November 1901 (sources disagree) and named Akatsuki, she was completed on 14 December 1901 and commissioned the same day.

== Service history ==
Akatsuki departed England on 25 January 1902 to make her delivery voyage to Japan, which she completed with her arrival at Yokosuka on 25 May 1902.

When the Russo-Japanese War broke out in February 1904, Akatsuki was part of either the 1st or 3rd Destroyer Division of the 1st Fleet, according to different sources. The war began that evening with the Battle of Port Arthur, a Japanese surprise attack on Imperial Russian Navy warships anchored in the outer roadstead of the Russian naval base at Port Arthur, China. Ten Japanese destroyers of the 1st, 2nd, and 3rd Destroyer Divisions made a torpedo attack in three waves, with the four destroyers of the 1st Destroyer Division (Akatsuki, Asashio, Kasumi, and Shirakumo) and Ikazuchi of the 2nd Destroyer Division constituting the first wave. They closed to about 650 yards (590 m) from the Russian ships and fired nine torpedoes. One of Kasumi′s torpedoes hit the Russian protected cruiser Pallada.

While taking part in the ensuing blockade of Port Arthur, Akatsuki struck a mine and sank off Dalniy southeast of Tieshan at 38°38′N 121°05′E on 17 May 1904. Her commanding officer was killed in her sinking.

Believing that the Russians had not observed the sinking of Akatsuki, the Japanese concealed her loss by making no announcement of it. Instead, they announced a new commanding officer had reported aboard her on 20 May 1904 — three days after her loss — and gave the name Akatsuki to the captured Imperial Russian Navy destroyer Reshitel‘nyi. The captured ship operated under the name Akatsuki until after the end of the war in early September 1905.

Meanwhile, the Japanese finally announced the loss of the original Akatsuki on 1 June 1905. They struck her from the naval register on 19 October 1905. That same day, they again renamed the captured Russian destroyer, changing her name from Akatsuki to Yamabiko, also transliterated as Yamahiko.
