= Akatsuki no Inu =

Japanese manga series

- First tankōbon volume cover

暁の犬
- Genre: Action; Drama; Historical
- Manga
- Written by: Toba Ryō
- Illustrated by: Takase Rie
- Published by: Leed Publishing
- Magazine: Comic Ran Twins
- Original run: September 13, 2019 – August 2023
- Volumes: 6

Akatsuki no Inu (Japanese: 暁の犬; "Dog of Dawn") is a Japanese manga series adapted from the novel Hissatsu Ken Ni Do written by Toba Ryō and illustrated by Takase Rie. It was serialized in Leed Publishing's seinen manga magazine Comic Ran Twins from September 2019 to August 2023, with its chapters collected in six tankōbon volumes as of December 2023.

== Publication ==
Originally written by Toba Ryō based on his Hissatsu Ken Ni Do novel and illustrated by Takase Rie, Akatsuki no Inu started in Leed Publishing's seinen manga magazine Comic Ran Twins on September 13, 2019; and finished serialization in August 2023. On November 7, 2023, the manga has also been distributed on pixiv comics. Leed Publishing collected its chapters in six tankōbon volumes, released from April 13, 2020, to November 13, 2023.

=== Volumes ===
No.	Japanese release date	Japanese ISBN
1	April 13, 2020	978-4-8458-5593-3
2	October 13, 2020	978-4-8458-5672-5
3	July 13, 2021	978-4-8458-5761-6
4	July 13, 2022	978-4-8458-5917-7
5	March 13, 2023	978-4-8458-6195-8
6	November 13, 2023	978-4-8458-6475-1
