= Russian battleship Knyaz Suvorov =

Russian Borodino-class battleship

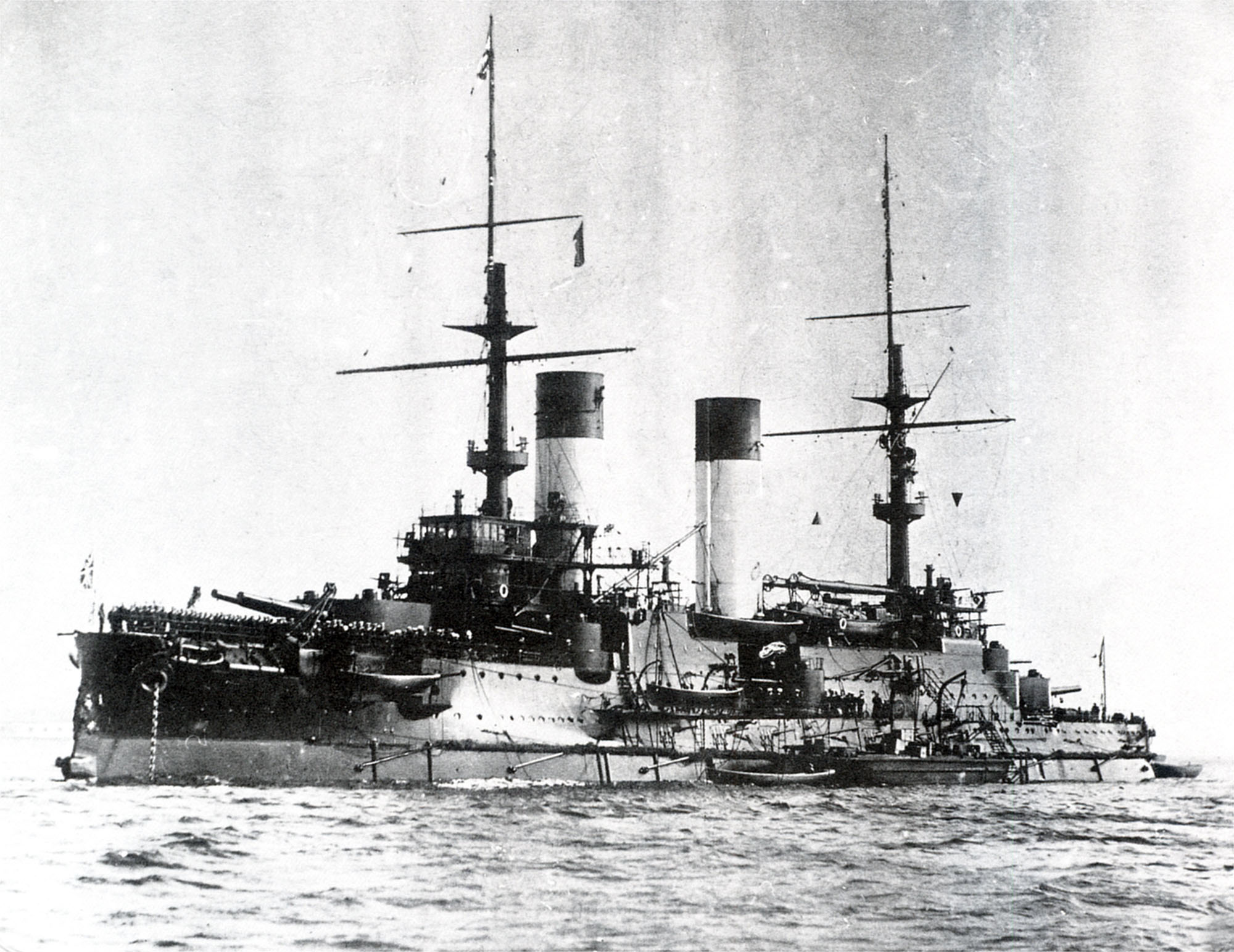
- Knyaz Suvorov, 1904

History

Russian Empire
- Name: Knyaz Suvorov (Князь Суворов)
- Namesake: Prince Alexander Suvorov
- Builder: Baltic Works, Saint Petersburg
- Cost: 13,841,000 rubles
- Laid down: 8 September 1901 (Note: All dates used in this article are New Style which is 12 days later before 1900 and 13 after 1900.)
- Launched: 25 September 1902
- In service: September 1904
- Fate: Sunk at the Battle of Tsushima, 27 May 1905

General characteristics
- Class & type: Borodino-class pre-dreadnought battleship
- Displacement: 14,415 long tons (14,646 t)
- Length: 397 ft (121.0 m) (o/a)
- Beam: 76 ft 1 in (23.2 m)
- Draft: 29 ft 2 in (8.9 m)
- Installed power: 20 Belleville boilers; 15,575 ihp (11,614 kW)
- Propulsion: 2 shafts, 2 triple-expansion steam engines
- Speed: 17.5 knots (32.4 km/h; 20.1 mph)
- Range: 2,590 nmi (4,800 km; 2,980 mi) at 10 knots (19 km/h; 12 mph)
- Complement: 782 (designed)
- Armament: 2 × twin 12 in (305 mm) guns; 6 × twin 6 in (152 mm) guns; 20 × single 75 mm (3 in) guns; 20 × single 47 mm (1.9 in) guns; 4 × 15 in (381 mm) torpedo tubes
- Armor: Krupp armor; Belt: 5.7–7.64 inches (145–194 mm); Deck: 1–2 inches (25–51 mm); Turrets: 10 inches (254 mm)

Knyaz Suvorov (Russian: Князь Суворов, Russian pronunciation: [ˈknʲæsʲ sʊˈvorəf]) was one of five Borodino-class pre-dreadnought battleships built for the Imperial Russian Navy in the first decade of the 20th century. Completed after the beginning of the Russo-Japanese War in 1904, she became the flagship of Vice admiral Zinovy Rozhestvensky, commander of the Second Pacific Squadron. The squadron was sent to the Far East a few months after her completion to break the Japanese blockade of Port Arthur. The Japanese captured the port while the squadron was in transit and their destination was changed to Vladivostok. During the Battle of Tsushima on 27 May 1905, the ship fell out of the battle line after a shell hit her bridge, killing her helmsman and wounding her captain and Rozhestvensky. Knyaz Suvorov was eventually torpedoed and sunk by Japanese torpedo boats; other than 20 wounded officers who were earlier evacuated by a destroyer, there were no survivors.

== Description ==
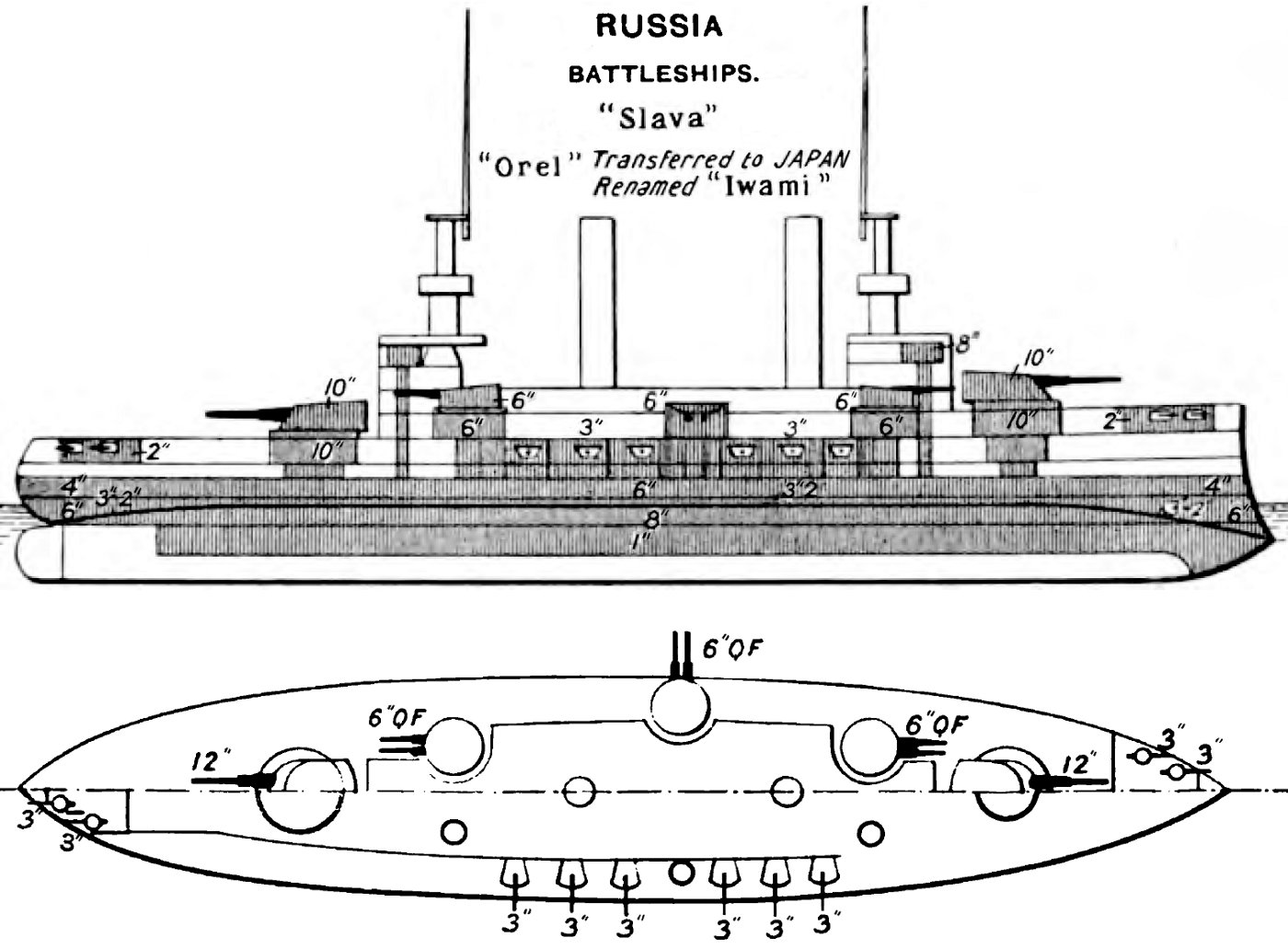
Right elevation and deck plan of her sister ship Slava as depicted in Brassey's Naval Annual 1906

The Borodino-class ships were based on the design of the French-built Tsesarevich, modified to suit Russian equipment and building practices. They were built under the 1898 program "for the needs of the Far East" to concentrate ten battleships in the Pacific. Knyaz Suvorov was 389 feet 5 inches (118.69 m) long at the waterline and 397 feet 3 inches (121.1 m) long overall, with a beam of 76 feet 1 inch (23.2 m) and a draft of 29 feet 2 inches (8.9 m), 38 inches (965 mm) more than designed. Her normal displacement was 14,415 long tons (14,646 t), almost 900 long tons (914 t) more than her designed displacement of 13,516 long tons (13,733 t). Her intended crew consisted of 28 officers and 754 enlisted men, although she carried 928 crewmen during the Battle of Tsushima.

The ships were powered by a pair of vertical triple-expansion steam engines, each driving one propeller shaft, using steam generated by 20 Belleville boilers. The engines were rated at 15,800 indicated horsepower (11,800 kW) and designed to reach a top speed of 18 knots (33 km/h; 21 mph). Knyaz Suvorov, however, only reached a speed of 17.5 knots (32.4 km/h; 20.1 mph) from 15,575 ihp (11,614 kW) during her builder's machinery trials on 9 August 1904. The ships could carry enough coal to give them a range of 2,590 nautical miles (4,800 km; 2,980 mi) at a speed of 10 knots (19 km/h; 12 mph).

The main battery of the Borodinos consisted of four 12-inch (305 mm) Pattern 1895 guns which were mounted in two twin-gun turrets, one each fore and aft of the superstructure. Their secondary armament of twelve 6-inch (152 mm) Pattern 1892 guns were mounted in six twin-gun turrets carried on the upper deck, three turrets on each broadside. Defense against torpedo boats was provided by a suite of smaller guns. The twenty 75-millimeter (3 in) Pattern 1892 guns carried were mounted in casemates in the sides of the hull. The ships also mounted twenty QF 3-pounder Hotchkiss (47 mm (1.9 in)) guns in the superstructure. The ships were fitted with four 15-inch (381 mm) torpedo tubes, one each above water in the bow and in the stern, and a submerged tube on each broadside.

The waterline armor belt of the Borodino class consisted of Krupp armor 5.7–7.64 inches (145–194 mm) thick. The armor of their gun turrets had a maximum thickness of 10 inches (254 mm) and their decks ranged from 1 to 2 inches (25 to 51 mm) in thickness. The 1.5-inch (38 mm) armored lower deck sloped downwards to connect to the anti-torpedo bulkhead of the same thickness.

== Service ==
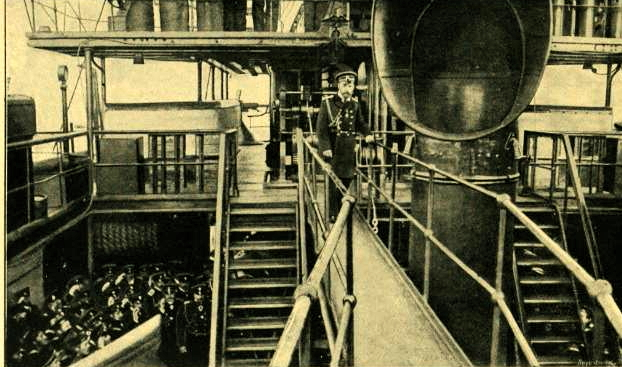
Tsar Nicholas II addressing the ship's crew before their departure

Construction began on Knyaz Suvorov, named after Prince Alexander Suvorov, on 10 August 1901 at the Baltic Works in Saint Petersburg. The ship was laid down on 8 September, when the ceremonial laying of one of the plates was performed by Grand Duke Alexei Alexandrovich, General-Admiral of the Imperial Russian Navy. She was launched on 25 September 1902, in the presence of Tsar Nicholas II of Russia, Grand Duke Konstantin, and King George I of Greece. She was completed in September 1904, after the beginning of the Russo-Japanese War, at the cost of 13,841,000 rubles.

On 15 October 1904, Knyaz Suvorov, Rozhestvensky's flagship as commander of the Second Pacific Squadron, set sail for Port Arthur from Libau along with the other vessels of the squadron with the mission of reinforcing the First Pacific Squadron at Port Arthur and breaking the Japanese blockade. Rozhestvensky had received numerous reports of Japanese agents and torpedo boats disguised as fishing vessels before sailing and he ordered maximum alertness after coaling at Skagen, Denmark, on 7 October. Early on the evening of the following day, when the squadron was near the Dogger Bank, the auxiliary repair ship Kamchatka reported that she was under attack by torpedo boats in the rain. About four hours later, the squadron encountered British fishing trawlers working the Dogger Bank in the fog and opened fire on them at very short range. One trawler was sunk and at least three others were damaged; several fishermen were killed and others wounded. The battleships also fired upon and damaged the Russian cruisers Aurora and Dmitrii Donskoi. The incident enraged the British population and caused a diplomatic incident with the British that nearly led to war until Russia apologized and agreed to pay reparations on 29 October.

Rozhestvensky led his ships down the Atlantic coast of Africa, rounding the Cape of Good Hope, and reached the island of Nosy Be off the northwest coast of French Madagascar on 9 January 1905 where they remained for two months while Rozhestvensky finalized his coaling arrangements. During this time, he learned of the capture of Port Arthur and changed his destination to Vladivostok, the only other port controlled by the Russians in the Far East. The squadron sailed for Cam Ranh Bay, French Indochina, on 16 March, and reached it almost a month later to await the obsolete ships of the Third Pacific Squadron, commanded by Rear Admiral Nikolai Nebogatov. The latter ships reached Cam Ranh Bay on 9 May and the combined force sailed for Vladivostok on 14 May. En route, Rozhestvensky reorganized his ships into three tactical divisions for the forthcoming battle; the leading division consisted of the four new Borodino-class battleships with Knyaz Suvorov in the lead, followed by the Second Division that consisted of three older battleships and an armored cruiser, and Nebogatov retained his ships as the Third Division. While exact figures are not available, it is probable that Knyaz Suvorov was approximately 1,700 long tons (1,727 t) overweight, as she and her sisters were overloaded with coal and other supplies, all of which was stored high in the ships and reduced their stability. The extra weight also submerged the waterline armor belt and left only about 4 feet 6 inches (1.4 m) of the upper armor belt above the waterline.

=== Battle of Tsushima ===
Rozhestvensky decided to take the most direct route to Vladivostok using the Tsushima Strait and was intercepted by the Japanese battlefleet under the command of Admiral Tōgō Heihachirō on 27 May 1905. As the Russians entered the strait, they were arrayed in separate columns with the Second Division on the left and the Third trailing. Around noon, well after they had been spotted by the Japanese, Rozhestvensky ordered the Second Division, led by the battleship Oslyabya, to form line ahead behind the First Division, but poorly trained signalmen caused confusion throughout the fleet and the Third Division fell in behind the Second Division, leaving the First Division on the main column's right, although it was still in the lead. When the main Japanese fleet was spotted by the Russians at 13:19, Rozhestvensky was still trying to get his ships properly formed.

The location sent to Tōgō had been inaccurate and his ships were out of position when they spotted the Russians; unwilling to engage the First Division, Tōgō maneuvered his ships across the front of the Russian forces and then reversed course to position his battleships on the left flank of the leading Russian ships. During this maneuver, Knyaz Suvorov opened fire at the Japanese battleship Mikasa, flagship of Admiral Tōgō Heihachirō at 14:05, at a range of 6,300 yards (5,800 m). Mikasa began to return fire after the Japanese ships had finished their maneuver and was joined by the battleship Asahi and the armored cruiser Azuma as the Japanese battleships split their fire between Knyaz Suvorov and Oslyabya. Around 14:20, the battleship Fuji joined the others firing at Knyaz Suvorov, which had been set on fire by hits from the other ships. At 14:35, splinters entered the conning tower, killing her helmsman and wounding Rozhestvensky and the ship's captain; splinters from another shell again wounded Rozhestvensky so he drifted in and out of consciousness. (Note: The overhanging roof of the conning tower deflected splinters from nearby hits into the conning tower.) Shortly afterwards, flames made the conning tower untenable so that the ship had to be steered from her auxiliary-control position. Around 14:52, another hit jammed the steering gear after a four point turn to starboard had been ordered and caused the ship to make nearly a full circle before she could be steered by her engines. Splinters from numerous shell hits shredded water hoses and made it much more difficult to put the numerous fires out. By this time, Knyaz Suvorov's aft 12-inch gun turret had been destroyed by an explosion that blew its roof off onto the quarterdeck, her forward funnel had fallen down, and her mainmast had been shot away.

Knyaz Suvorov never regained her position in the battle line and was engaged at short range by Mikasa and the battleship Shikishima as well as five cruisers of Vice Admiral Kamimura Hikonojō's 2nd Division between 15:20 and 15:35. Mikasa and two of the cruisers fired one torpedo each at her during this time, but none of them hit the ship. At 15:39, the cruiser Chihaya fired a pair of torpedoes and claimed one hit although no change was visible in Knyaz Suvorov's condition. Chihaya was hit by one shell just above the waterline during her attack that forced her to make emergency repairs. Around 15:40, the British observer aboard Azuma recorded that Knyaz Suvorov was down by the bow with a heavy list to port and was covered by thick gray smoke from the forecastle to the mainmast. By this time, the ship's forward 12-inch gun turret had been knocked out, but some smaller guns were still in action. The Japanese 5th Destroyer Division attacked five minutes later with torpedoes at ranges under 900 yards (820 m), but failed to score any hits with their five torpedoes. The flotilla leader was hit in the boiler room by a three-inch shell that may have been fired by Knyaz Suvorov.

The ship found herself between the two fleets at 16:08 and was fired at by most of the Japanese ships at short range. Observers aboard those ships noted that she resembled "an island volcano in eruption". Mikasa fired two torpedoes and Shikishima fired one torpedo at Knyaz Suvorov during this time without effect. Captain William C. Pakenham, the Royal Navy's official military observer aboard Asahi under the Anglo-Japanese Alliance, noted that Knyaz Suvorov was hit by a 12-inch shell near the rear 6-inch turret around 16:30 that caused an explosion and caused flames to spout 50 feet (15 m) in the air. At 17:05 the 4th Destroyer Division attacked with three destroyers; only one of the six torpedoes hit Knyaz Suvorov. The ship immediately took on a 10° list, but showed no signs of sinking. One shell from Knyaz Suvorov struck the destroyer Asagiri, but did not inflict much damage.

Around 17:30, the Russian destroyer Buinyi came and took off the wounded officers from Knyaz Suvorov, including Rozhestvensky, leaving an unwounded midshipman in command. The ship continued southwards at about 4–5 knots (7.4–9.3 km/h; 4.6–5.8 mph) and was engaged by many of the Japanese cruisers from about 18:30 until four torpedo boats of the 11th Torpedo Division attacked at 19:20. They fired seven torpedoes of which two or three hit the ship. One was thought to have caused a magazine to explode as a cloud of yellow and black smoke poured out and Knyaz Suvorov listed further to port before capsizing at about 19:30. Other than the 20 officers taken off by Buinyi, there were no survivors of the 928 crew aboard. Naval historian Sir Julian Corbett commented: "While she had a gun above water she fired, and not a man survived her of all that crew, to whose stubborn gallantry no words can do justice. If there is immortality in naval memory it is hers and theirs."

== Bibliography ==
- Arbuzov, Vladimir V. (1993). Borodino Class Armored Ships. Armored Ships of the World. Vol. 1. Saint Petersburg: Interpoisk. OCLC 43727130.
- Campbell, N. J. M. (1978). "The Battle of Tsu-Shima". In Preston, Antony (ed.). Warship II. London: Conway Maritime Press. pp. 38–49, 127–135, 186–192, 258–265. ISBN 0-87021-976-6.
- Campbell, N. J. M. (1979). "Russia". In Chesneau, Roger & Kolesnik, Eugene M. (eds.). Conway's All the World's Fighting Ships 1860–1905. New York: Mayflower Books. pp. 170–217. ISBN 0-8317-0302-4.
- Corbett, Sir Julian S. (2015) [1914]. Maritime Operations in the Russo-Japanese War, 1904-1905. Vol. 2. Annapolis, Maryland: Naval Institute Press. ISBN 978-1-59114-198-3.
- Forczyk, Robert (2009). Russian Battleship vs Japanese Battleship, Yellow Sea 1904–05. Duel. Vol. 15. London: Osprey. ISBN 978-1-84603-330-8.
- Gribovsky, Vladimir (2010). Эскадренные броненосцы типа "Бородино" [Borodino Class Squadron Battleships] (in Russian). St. Petersburg: Gangut. ISBN 978-5-904180-10-2.
- Hough, Richard (1958). The Fleet That had to Die. New York: Viking Press. OCLC 832919.
- McLaughlin, Stephen (2003). Russian & Soviet Battleships. Annapolis, Maryland: Naval Institute Press. ISBN 1-55750-481-4.
- Pleshakov, Constatine (2002). The Tsar's Last Armada: The Epic Voyage to the Battle of Tsushima. New York: Basic Books. ISBN 0-465-05791-8.
- Silverstone, Paul H. (1984). Directory of the World's Capital Ships. New York: Hippocrene Books. ISBN 0-88254-979-0.
