= Japanese patrol vessel Akatsuki =

Shikishima-class patrol vessel of Japanese Coast Guard

History

Japan
- Name: Akatsuki; (あかつき)
- Builder: Mitsubishi, Nagasaki
- Cost: 26.2 billion ¥
- Laid down: 16 February 2018
- Launched: 10 April 2020
- Commissioned: 16 February 2021
- Home port: Kagoshima
- Identification: IMO number: 9907732; MMSI number: 431015836; Callsign: 7KGN; Pennant number: PLH-34
- Status: Active

General characteristics
- Class & type: Reimei-class patrol vessel
- Tonnage: 6,500 GT
- Displacement: 9,300 tons (full load)
- Length: 150.0 m (492 ft 2 in)
- Beam: 17 m (55 ft 9 in)
- Draft: 9.0 m (29 ft 6 in)
- Propulsion: 2 × shafts; 4 × IHI-SEMT Pielstick 16 PC2.5 V400 diesel engines
- Speed: 25 knots (46 km/h; 29 mph)
- Range: 20,000 nmi (37,000 km; 23,000 mi)
- Armament: 2 × Bofors 40 mm gun; 2 × JM61 20 mm guns
- Aircraft carried: 2 × EC225LP helicopters

Akatsuki (PLH-34) is a Reimei-class patrol vessel currently operated by the Japanese Coast Guard.

== Design ==
Reimei-class carries two 40 mm autocanon and two JM61 20 mm machine guns, as does the Akitsushima. Gun mounts of 40 mm autocanons are changed to Mk4, which is lighter than the Mk3 mounted on the Akitsushima. Both are capable of being remotely controlled with optical directors.

Aviation facilities are also similar to that of Akitsushima, capable of carrying two EC225LP Super Puma helicopters: however, only one helicopter is normally carried on this vessel.

== Construction and career ==
Akatsuki was laid down on 16 February 2018 and launched on 10 April 2020 by Mitsubishi, Nagasaki. She was commissioned on 16 February 2021.
