= Japanese cruiser Chihaya =

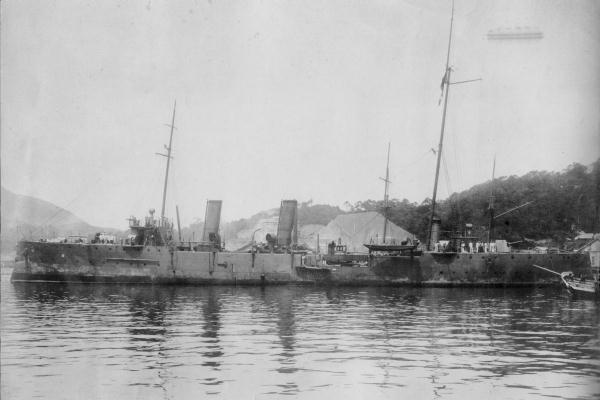
- Chihaya in 1906 at Maizuru

History

Empire of Japan
- Name: Chihaya
- Ordered: 1896 Fiscal Year
- Builder: Yokosuka Naval Arsenal
- Laid down: 7 May 1898
- Launched: 26 May 1900
- Completed: 9 September 1901
- Stricken: 1 September 1928
- Fate: Scrapped 25 July 1939

General characteristics
- Type: Unprotected cruiser
- Displacement: 1,238 long tons (1,258 t)
- Length: 83.19 m (272.9 ft)
- Beam: 9.63 m (31.6 ft)
- Draft: 3.35 m (11.0 ft)
- Propulsion: 2-shaft reciprocating VTE, 6,000 ihp (4,500 kW), 6 boilers, 344 tons coal
- Speed: 21 knots (24 mph; 39 km/h)
- Complement: 125
- Armament: 2 × QF 4.7 inch Gun Mk I–IVs; 4 × QF 3 pounder Hotchkiss guns; 2 × 18 in (460 mm) torpedo tubes

Chihaya (千早) was an unprotected cruiser of the Imperial Japanese Navy. The name Chihaya comes from Chihaya Castle, near Osaka, the site of one of the battles of the Genkō War of 1333.

== Background ==
Chihaya was based on previous designs for dispatch vessels made by the French military advisor Emile Bertin, and was built in Japan by the Yokosuka Naval Arsenal. Due to her small size she is sometimes classified as a corvette or gunboat, but was used by the Imperial Japanese Navy primarily as an aviso (dispatch boat) for scouting, reconnaissance and delivery of his priority messages.

== Design ==
Similar in design to Yaeyama and Miyako, Chihaya had a steel hull, and retained a full barque rigging with two masts for auxiliary sail propulsion in addition to her steam engine, which was 2-shaft reciprocating vertical triple-expansion engine with 6 cylindrical Normand boilers driving two shafts and developing 6,000 ihp (4,500 kW). Chihaya was armed with two QF 4.7-inch Gun Mk I–IVs guns and four QF 3 pounder Hotchkiss guns. In addition, she carried two torpedoes, mounted on the deck.

== Service record ==
Chihaya was laid down on 7 May 1898 and launched on 26 May 1900 in a ceremony attended by Emperor Meiji. She was completed on 9 September 1901.

On the afternoon of 18 June 1901 while still on trials before formal commissioning, Chiyaha collided off Tateyama, Chiba with the destroyer Akebono, which was on a torpedo training exercise. Both vessels suffered from minor damage.

During the Russo-Japanese War of 1904–1905, Chiyaha participated in the naval Battle of Port Arthur and subsequent blockade of that port. She was subsequently at the Battle of the Yellow Sea and the Battle of Tsushima. As this latter battle, Chiyaha commanded a squadron of destroyers which sank the Russian battleship Knyaz Suvorov and repair ship Kamchatka.

On 26 August 1912, Chiyaha was re-classified as a first-class gunboat .

During the First World War, Chiyaha was assigned to patrols of former German Micronesia, which has been occupied by Japan during the early stages of the war.

From 1918 to 1923, Chiyaha was assigned to provide support for the Japanese intervention in Siberia in support of the White Movement armies against the Bolshevik Red Army by making patrols of the eastern coast of Russia. From May to October 1928, Chiyaha was converted at the Yokosuka Naval Arsenal to be a training vessel, and was removed from the navy list on 1 September 1928. She was subsequently transferred to the Imperial Japanese Naval Academy, where she served as a training hulk until 25 July 1939. Her hulk was still afloat at Etajima at the end of World War II, when she was scrapped.
