= Akatsuki-class destroyer (1901) =

Japanese naval vessel

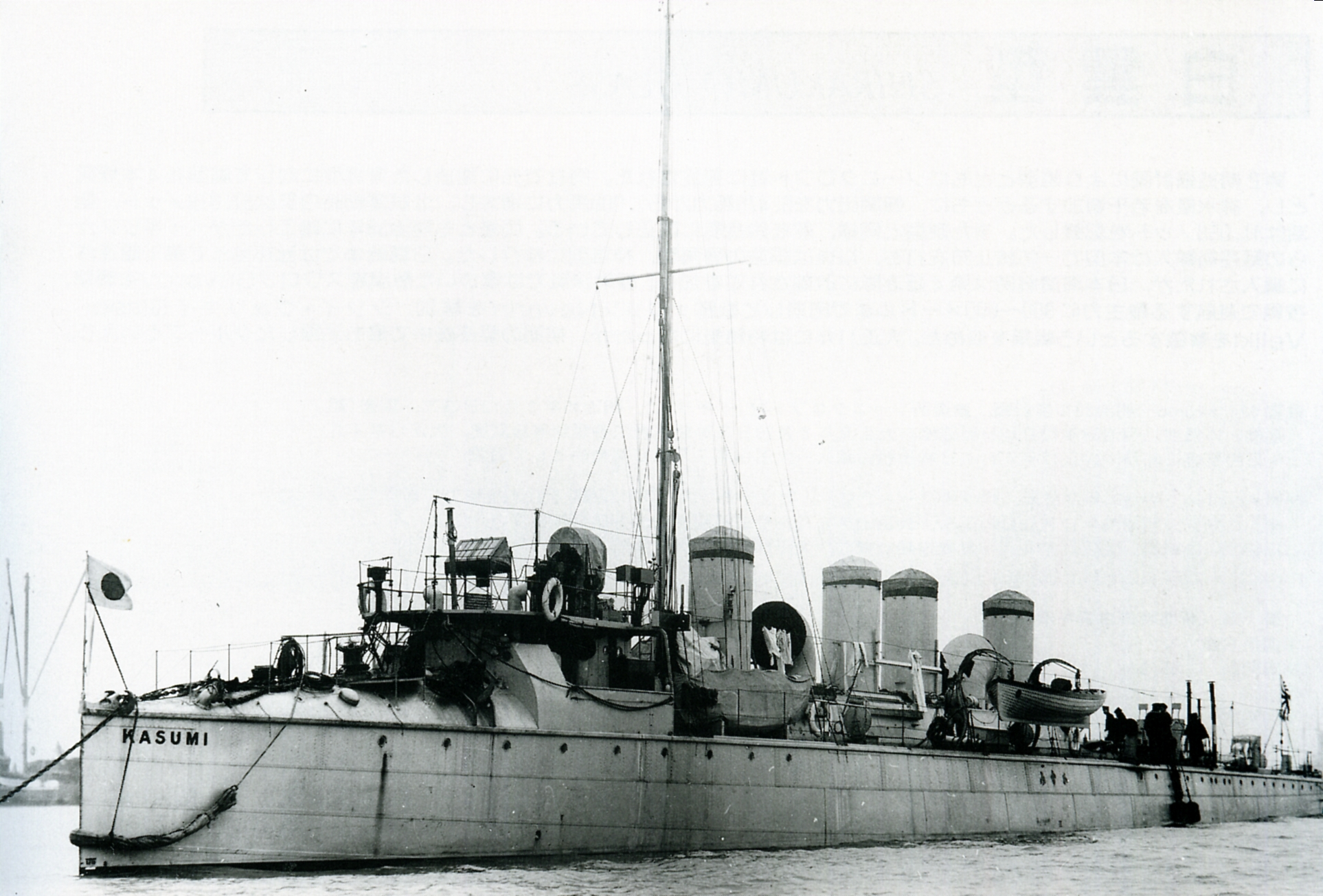
- Akatsuki-class destroyer Kasumi in London on commissioning, 1902

Class overview
- Name: Akatsuki class
- Builders: Yarrow & Co, Cubitt Town, London
- Operators: Imperial Japanese Navy
- Preceded by: Murakumo class
- Succeeded by: Shirakumo class
- In commission: December 1901 – April 1913
- Completed: 2
- Lost: 1
- Retired: 1

General characteristics
- Type: Destroyer
- Displacement: 363 long tons (369 t) normal, 415 long tons (422 t) full load
- Length: 67.29 m (220.8 ft) pp, 68.45 m (224.6 ft) overall
- Beam: 6.28 m (20.6 ft)
- Draught: 1.73 m (5.7 ft)
- Propulsion: 2-shaft reciprocating, 4 Yarrow boilers, 6,000 ihp (4,500 kW)
- Speed: 30 knots (56 km/h)
- Complement: 62
- Armament: 1 × QF 12 pounder 12 cwt naval gun; 5 × QF 6 pounder Hotchkiss; 2 × 450 mm (18 in) torpedoes

The Akatsuki-class destroyers (暁型駆逐艦, Akatsukigata kuchikukan) was a class of two torpedo boat destroyers (TBDs) of the Imperial Japanese Navy, built in Britain in 1901–02.

== Background ==
The Akatsuki-class destroyers were ordered under the 1897 fiscal budget as a follow-on to the earlier Ikazuchi class. Both were ordered on 5 November 1900 from Yarrow & Co, and built at their London Yard, Cubitt Town, London.

== Design ==
Substantially identical to the previous Ikazuchi class, the main difference between the vessels was in the design of its rudder. With the previous class, the rudder was semi-balanced, and had a portion exposed above the waterline. This made the vessel vulnerable to disablement by stray gunfire. The Akatsuki class was intended to remedy this design flaw. Only two vessels were procured, as the Japanese navy intended to study the technique and to retrofit the existing Ikazuchi-class vessels in Japan.

The design was similar to the four-stack Royal Navy B class, also known as the "Thirty Knotters".

Both vessels had a flush deck design with a distinctive "turtleback" forecastle that was intended to clear water from the bow during high speed navigation, but was poorly designed for high waves or bad weather. The bridge and forward gun platform were barely raised above the bow, resulting in a wet conning position. More than half of the small hull was occupied by the boilers and the engine room. With fuel and weaponry, there was little space left for crew quarters.

Both were powered by triple expansion steam engines and had coal-fired water-tube boilers. Armament was one QF 12-pounder gun on a bandstand on the forecastle, five QF 6 pounder Hotchkiss guns (two sited abreast the conning tower, two sited between the funnels and one on the quarterdeck) and two single tubes for 18-inch (460 mm) torpedoes.

== Operational history ==
Both Akatsuki-class destroyers arrived in Japan in time to be used in combat service during the Russo-Japanese War of 1904–1905. Akatsuki arrived at Yokosuka on 7 May 1902 and Kasumi on 25 June.

During the Russo-Japanese War, Akatsuki struck a naval mine off Port Arthur and sank on 17 May 1904 at 38°38′N 121°05′E.

After the end of the Russo-Japanese War, Kasumi was re-classified as third-class destroyer on 28 August 1912 and was removed from front line combat service. The ship was used as an unarmed utility vessel until 1920.

== List of ships ==
Kanji	Name translation	Builder	Laid down	Launched	Completed	Fate
暁	Akatsuki "Daybreak"	Yarrow & Co, Cubitt Town, London	10 December 1900	13 February 1901	14 December 1901	mined off Port Arthur 17 May 1904 written off 19 October 1905
霞	Kasumi "Mist"	Yarrow & Co, Cubitt Town, London	1 February 1901	23 January 1902	14 February 1902	demilitarized 1 April 1913; Broken up 1 July 1920
