= Max Kyuss =

Soviet conductor and composer

Kyuss in 1930s

Max Avelyevich Kyuss (Russian: Макс Авельевич Кюсс; March 20, 1874 – 1942) was a Russian and Soviet musician, conductor and composer, primarily in the Russian and Soviet military. He is most famous for composing the waltz Amur Waves.

== Education and military service ==
According to Kyuss's autobiography, he was born into a working-class Jewish family in Odessa on March 20, 1874. He was drafted into the Russian army and assigned to a squad of musicians. After doing mandatory service, he joined and graduated from the Odessa National Academy of Music, and in 1903 rejoined the army as a kapellmeister. He served in the 2nd Eastern Siberian Rifle Regiment, and participated in the Russo–Japanese War of 1905. During his service, while stationed in Vladivostok, he composed his magnum opus, the waltz Amur Waves. From May 1, 1907 Kyuss served in the 11th Eastern Siberian Rifle Regument, and from January 1, 1911 in the 33rd Siberian Rifle Regiment. In this capacity he was stationed on Russky Island. In 1911 he became a Lutheran.

Kyuss participated in World War I as a kapellmeister in the 5th Don Cossack Regiment, then in the Gregorian Special Cavalier Battalion. In the Russian Civil War, Kyuss was a kapellmeister for the Red Army, serving in the 416th Black Sea Rifle Regiment. In 1920–22 he served in the same capacity in the 33rd Rifle Brigade in Odessa. In 1922 he headed an orchestra in Kharkiv, and for a time headed the Kremlin honor guard—though according to his superiors, he was "politically backward", i.e. did not adhere enough to the Communist ideology—a problem for an officer so close to the government. He retired from military command in 1927. He continued working as a military composer in the Joint State Political Directorate until 1934. Among other things, he was a kapellmeister during the construction of the Moscow Canal. In 1934 he joined the Odessa People's Militia as a kapellmeister.

== Later life and death ==
Kyuss retired in 1937, continuing to teach the clarinet at the Odessa Military Academy of Music. In World War II, he was placed in a Jewish ghetto in Odessa by the invading Nazis. Kyuss was last seen in late 1941, and was likely killed in the 1941 Odessa massacre.

== Selected works ==
- Amur Waves (Амурские волны) – waltz
- A Broken Life (Разбитая жизнь) – waltz
- My Secret (Моя тайна) – waltz
- Bitterness of the Soul (Скорбь души) – waltz
- My Dreams (Мои грёзы) – waltz
- Sad Thoughts (Грустные думы) – waltz
- Queen of the Screen (Королева экрана) – waltz, dedicated to Vera Kholodnaya
- Heart of the East (Сердце востока) – waltz
- A Night in Brazil (Ночь в Бразилии) – tango
- Greetings to the Republic (Привет республике) – march
