= Russo-Japanese War =

1904–1905 conflict in East Asia

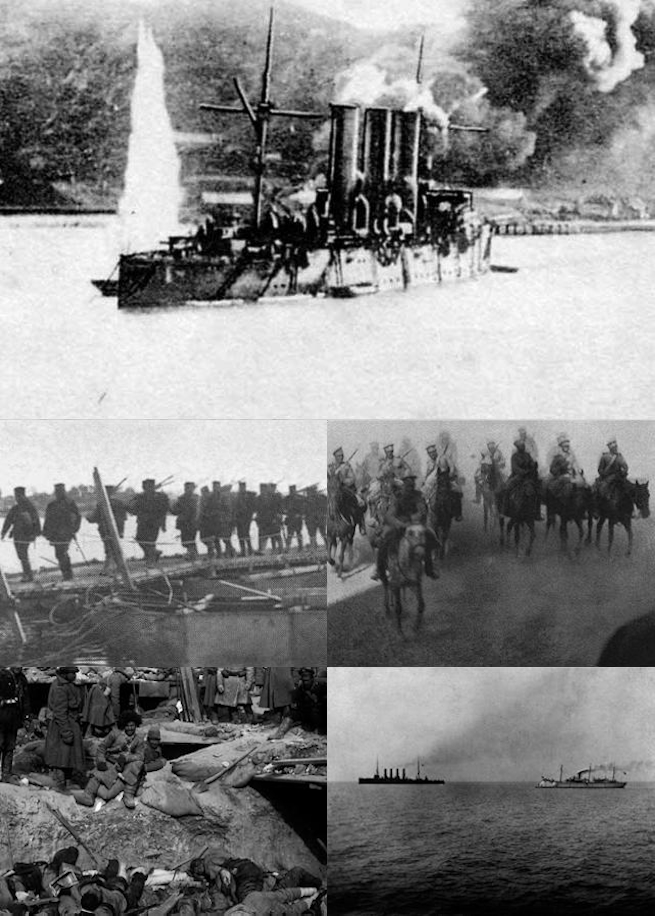
- Clockwise from top: Russian cruiser Pallada under fire at Port Arthur, Russian cavalry at Mukden, Russian cruiser Varyag and gunboat Korietz at Chemulpo Bay, Japanese dead at Port Arthur, Japanese infantry crossing the Yalu River
Date	8 February 1904 – 5 September 1905 (1 year, 6 months and 4 weeks)
Location	Manchuria, Yellow Sea, Korea, Sea of Japan
Result	Japanese victory
Territorial changes	Russia cedes Port Arthur and Dalniy in the Liaodong peninsula, Southern Sakhalin, and control of the South Manchuria Railway to Japan; Kvantunskaya Oblast and Southern Sakhalin become Kwantung Leased Territory and Karafuto Prefecture, respectively

Belligerents
Russia	Japan

Commanders and leaders
Supreme Commander; Nicholas II; Imperial Russian Army; Aleksey Kuropatkin; Roman Kondratenko †; Anatoly Stessel (surrendered); Oskar Gripenberg; Mikhail Zasulich; Ali-Agha Shikhlinski; Nikolay Orlov; Imperial Russian Navy; Yevgeni Alekseyev; Stepan Makarov †; Wilgelm Vitgeft †; Robert Viren; Zinovy Rozhestvensky	Supreme Commander: Emperor Meiji; Imperial Japanese Army; Ōyama Iwao; Yamagata Aritomo; Kodama Gentarō; Nogi Maresuke; Kuroki Tamemoto; Oku Yasukata; Terauchi Masatake; Imperial Japanese Navy; Yamamoto Gonbē; Tōgō Heihachirō; Kamimura Hikonojō

Strength
1,365,000 (total): 900,000 (peak)	1,200,000 (total): 650,000 (peak)

Casualties and losses
Total: 43,300–71,453 dead: 34,000–52,623 killed or died of wounds; 9,300–18,830 died of disease; 146,032 wounded; 74,369 captured; Material losses: 8 battleships sunk; 2 battleships captured	Total: 80,378–86,100 dead: 47,152–47,400 killed; 11,424–11,500 died of wounds; 21,802–27,200 died of disease; 153,673–173,400 wounded; Material losses: 2 battleships sunk

The Russo-Japanese War (Note: Russian: Русско-японская война, romanized: Russko-yaponskaya voyna; Japanese: 日露戦争, romanized: Nichi-ro sensō) (8 February 1904 – 5 September 1905) was fought between the Russian Empire and the Empire of Japan over rival imperial ambitions in Manchuria and the Korean Empire. The major land battles of the war were fought on the Liaodong Peninsula and near Mukden in Southern Manchuria, with naval battles taking place in the Yellow Sea and the Sea of Japan.

At the end of the First Sino-Japanese War, the Treaty of Shimonoseki of 1895 had ceded the Liaodong Peninsula and Port Arthur to Japan before the Triple Intervention, in which Russia, Germany, and France forced Japan to relinquish its claim. Japan feared that Russia would impede its plans to establish a sphere of influence in mainland Asia, especially as Russia built the Trans-Siberian Railroad, began making inroads in Korea, and acquired a lease of the Liaodong Peninsula and Port Arthur from China in 1898. Japan signed the Anglo-Japanese Alliance in 1902, and began offering to recognize Russia's dominance in Manchuria in exchange for recognition of Korea as part of Japan's sphere of influence. However, this was rejected by Russia.

After negotiations broke down, Japan opened hostilities in a surprise attack on the Russian Pacific Fleet at Port Arthur on 9 February [O.S. 27 January] 1904. Both sides declared war, and Japanese troops landed in Korea, crossed the Yalu River into Manchuria in May, and landed more forces on the Liaodong Peninsula. In August, the Japanese laid siege to Port Arthur, which eventually fell in January 1905. In March 1905, Japanese troops took Mukden, the Manchurian capital, after heavy fighting. The Russian Baltic Fleet, which had sailed over seven months and 18,000 nautical miles (33,000 km) from the Baltic Sea to reinforce its Pacific Fleet, arrived in the region in May and was intercepted and destroyed by the Japanese Combined Fleet at the Battle of Tsushima. The war was concluded with the Treaty of Portsmouth (5 September [O.S. 23 August] 1905), mediated by US president Theodore Roosevelt.

The treaty recognized Japanese interests in Korea, and awarded to Japan Russia's lease on the Liaodong Peninsula, control of the Russian-built South Manchuria Railway, and the southern half of the island of Sakhalin (Karafuto). The complete military victory of an Asian and non-Western nation over a European and Western power surprised international observers, and transformed the global balance of power, with the Empire of Japan emerging as a great power and the Russian Empire declining in prestige among the European powers. Russia's incurrence of substantial casualties and losses for a cause which resulted in a humiliating defeat contributed to internal unrest culminating in the 1905 Russian Revolution, during which the Russian autocracy was forced to make concessions. More widely, however, Japan's win effectively damaged the credibility of European dominance across Asia.

== Historical background ==
=== Modernization of Japan ===
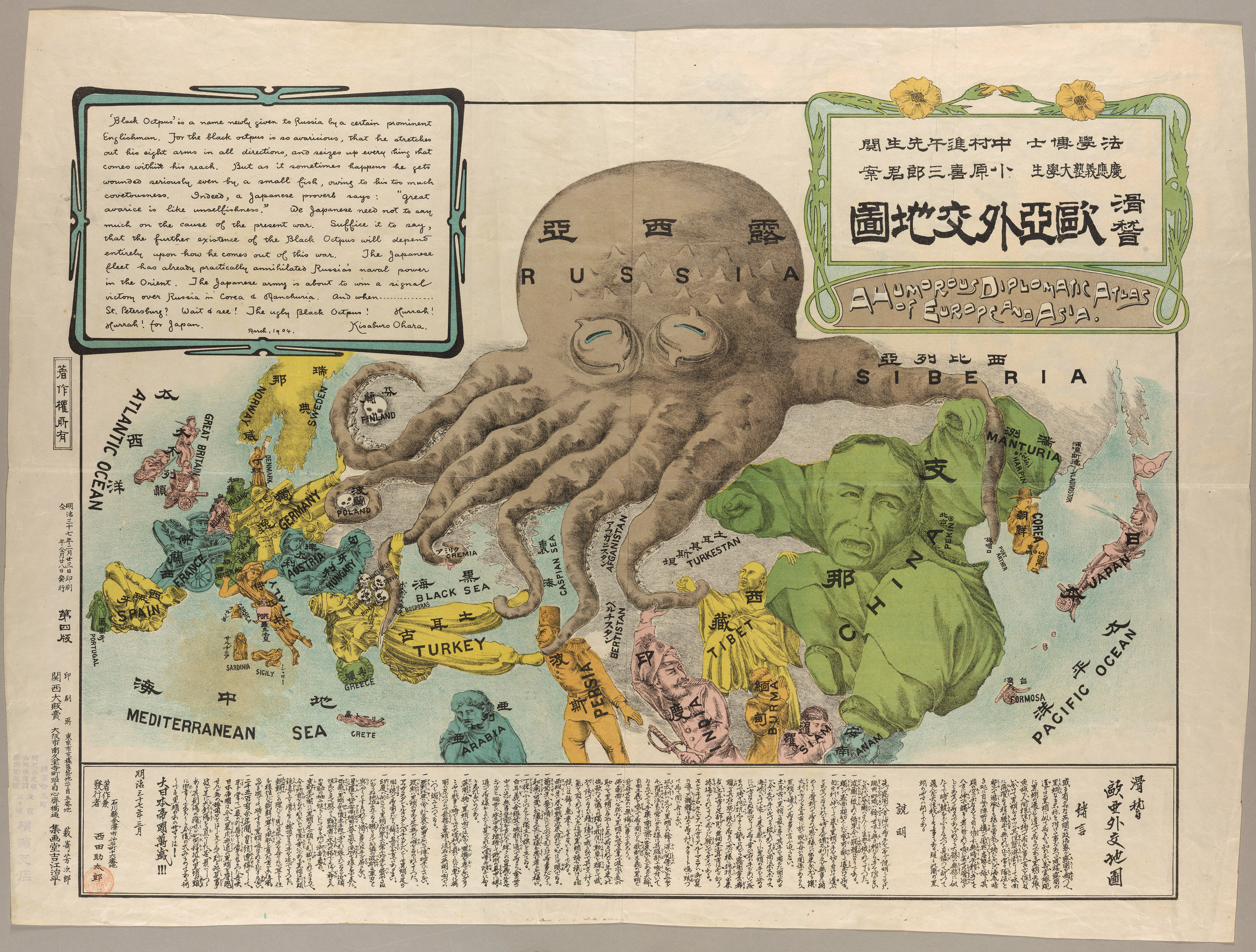
This anti-Russian satirical map was produced by a Japanese student at Keio University during the Russo–Japanese War. It follows the design used for a similar map first published in 1877.

After the Meiji Restoration in 1868, the Meiji government endeavoured to assimilate Western ideas, technological advances and ways of warfare. By the late 19th century, Japan had transformed itself into a modernized industrial state. The Japanese wanted to be recognized as equal with the Western powers. The Meiji Restoration had been intended to make Japan a modernized state, not a Westernized one, and Japan was an imperialist power, looking towards overseas expansionism.

==== A Japanese sphere of influence ====
The United States saw Japan as an ally in the U.S.'s quest to control the Pacific and maintain for the U.S. China's "Open Door Policy." In Autumn 1872, U.S. minister to Japan Charles DeLong explained to U.S. General Charles LeGendre that he had been urging the Government of Japan to occupy Taiwan and "civilize" the Taiwanese indigenous people just as the U.S. had taken over the land of the Native Americans and "civilized" them. General LeGendre encouraged the Japanese to declare a Japanese "sphere of influence" modeled on the Monroe Doctrine that the U.S. had declared for the exclusion of other powers from the Western Hemisphere. Such a Japanese sphere of influence would be the first time a non-White state would adopt such a policy. The stated aim of the sphere of influence would be to civilize the barbarians of Asia. "Pacify and civilize them if possible, and if not...exterminate them or otherwise deal with them as the United States and England have dealt with the barbarians," LeGendre explained to the Japanese.

In the years 1869–1873, the Seikanron ("Conquer Korea Argument") had bitterly divided the Japanese elite: one faction wanted to conquer Korea immediately, while the other wanted to wait until Japan was further modernized before embarking on a war to conquer Korea. Significantly, no one in the Japanese elite had ever accepted the idea that the Koreans had the right to be independent, with only the question of timing dividing the two factions. In much the same way that Europeans used the "backwardness" of African and Asian nations as a reason for why they had to conquer them, for the Japanese elite the "backwardness" of China and Korea was proof of the inferiority of those nations, thus giving the Japanese the "right" to conquer them.

Count Inoue Kaoru, the foreign minister, gave a speech in 1887 saying "What we must do is to transform our empire and our people, make the empire like the countries of Europe and our people like the peoples of Europe," going on to say that the Chinese and Koreans had essentially forfeited their right to be independent by not modernizing. Much of the pressure for an aggressive foreign policy in Japan came from below, with the advocates of a "people's rights" movement calling for an elected parliament also favouring an ultra-nationalist line that took it for granted the Japanese had the "right" to annex Korea, as the "people's rights" movement was led by those who favoured invading Korea in the years 1869–1873.

As part of the modernization process in Japan, social Darwinist ideas about the "survival of the fittest" were common from the 1880s onward and many ordinary Japanese resented the heavy taxes imposed by the government to modernize Japan, demanding something tangible like an overseas colony as a reward for their sacrifices.

Furthermore, the educational system of Meiji Japan was meant to train the schoolboys to be soldiers when they grew up, and as such, Japanese schools indoctrinated their students into Bushidō ("way of the warrior"), the fierce code of the samurai. Having indoctrinated the younger generations into Bushidō, the Meiji elite found themselves faced with a people who clamored for war, and regarded diplomacy as a weakness.

=== Pressure from the people ===
The British Japanologist Richard Storry wrote that the biggest misconception about Japan in the West was that the Japanese people were the "docile" instruments of the elite, when in fact much of the pressure for Japan's wars from 1894 to 1941 came from the ordinary people, who demanded a "tough" foreign policy, and tended to engage in riots and assassination when foreign policy was perceived to be pusillanimous.

Though the Meiji oligarchy refused to allow liberal democracy, they did seek to appropriate some of the demands of the "people's rights" movement by allowing an elected Imperial Diet in 1890 (with limited powers and an equally limited franchise) and by pursuing an aggressive foreign policy towards Korea.

In 1884, Japan had encouraged a coup in the Kingdom of Korea by a pro-Japanese reformist faction, which led to the conservative government calling upon China for help, leading to a clash between Chinese and Japanese soldiers in Seoul. At the time, Tokyo did not feel ready to risk a war with China, and the crisis was ended by the Convention of Tientsin, which left Korea more strongly in the Chinese sphere of influence, though it did give the Japanese the right to intervene in Korea. All through the 1880s and early 1890s, the government in Tokyo was regularly criticized for not being aggressive enough in Korea, leading Japanese historian Masao Maruyama to write:

Just as Japan was subject to pressure from the Great Powers, so she would apply pressure to still weaker countries – a clear case of the transfer psychology. In this regard it is significant that ever since the Meiji period demands for a tough foreign policy have come from the common people, that is, from those who are at the receiving end of oppression at home.

=== Russian Eastern expansion ===
Tsarist Russia, as a major imperial power, had ambitions in the East. By the 1890s it had extended its realm across Central Asia to Afghanistan, absorbing local states in the process. The Russian Empire stretched from Poland in the west to the Kamchatka Peninsula in the east. With its construction of the Trans-Siberian Railway to the port of Vladivostok, Russia hoped to further consolidate its influence and presence in the region. In the Tsushima incident of 1861 Russia had directly assaulted Japanese territory.

=== First Sino-Japanese War (1894–95) ===
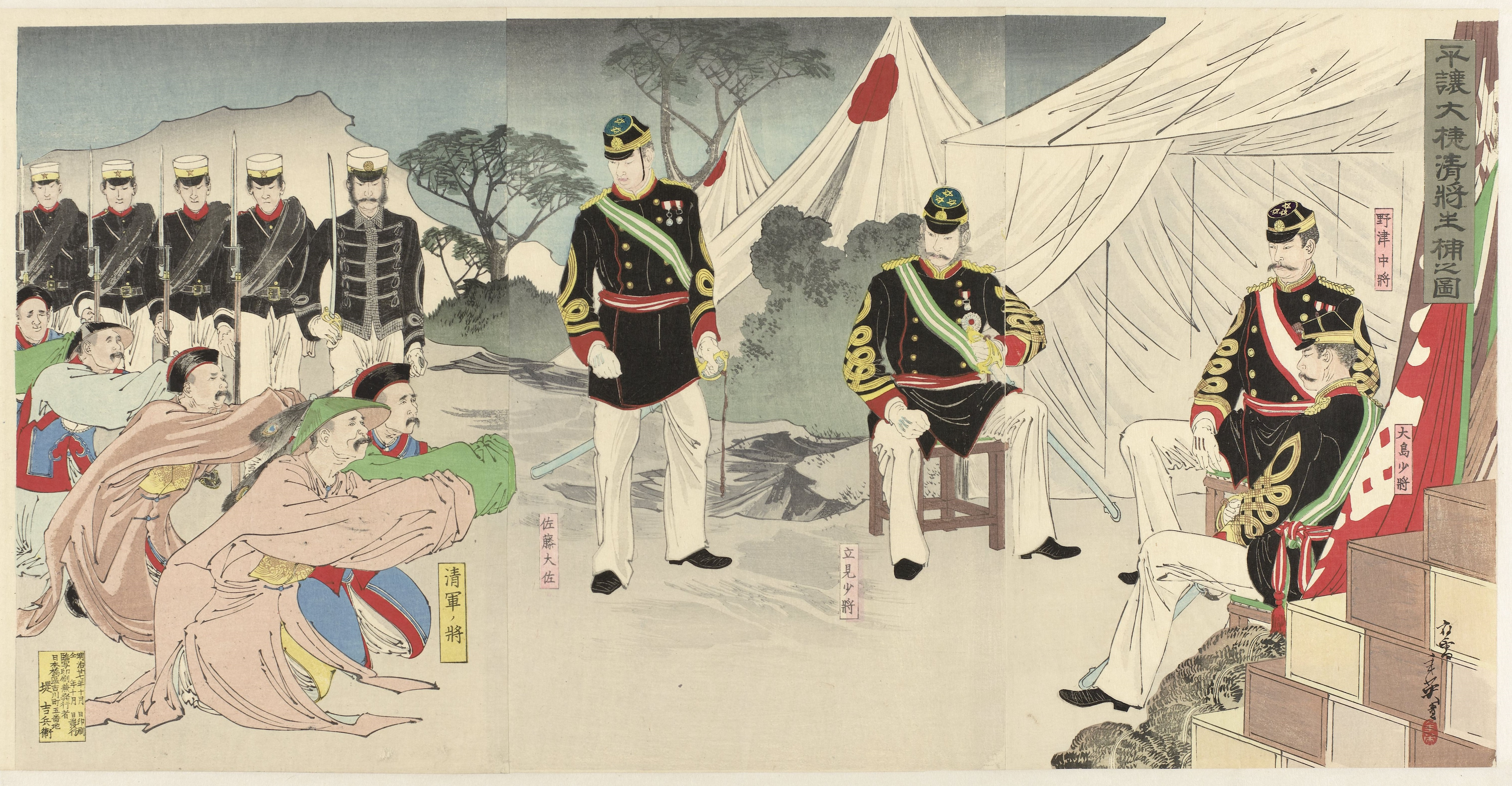
Chinese generals in Pyongyang surrender to the Japanese, October 1894.

The first major war the Empire of Japan fought following the Meiji Restoration was against China, from 1894 to 1895. The war revolved around the issue of control and influence over Korea under the rule of the Joseon dynasty. From the 1880s onward, there had been vigorous competition for influence in Korea between China and Japan. The Korean court was prone to factionalism, and at the time was badly divided between a reformist camp that was pro-Japanese and a more conservative faction that was pro-Chinese. In 1884, a pro-Japanese coup attempt was put down by Chinese troops, and a "residency" under General Yuan Shikai was established in Seoul. A peasant rebellion led by the Tonghak religious movement led to a request by the Korean government for the Qing dynasty to send in troops to stabilize the country. The Empire of Japan responded by sending their own force to Korea to crush the Tonghak and installed a puppet government in Seoul. China objected and war ensued. Hostilities proved brief, with Japanese ground troops routing Chinese forces on the Liaodong Peninsula and nearly destroying the Chinese Beiyang Fleet in the Battle of the Yalu River. Japan and China signed the Treaty of Shimonoseki, which ceded the Liaodong Peninsula and the island of Taiwan to Japan. After the peace treaty, Russia, Germany, and France forced Japan to withdraw from the Liaodong Peninsula. The leaders of Japan did not feel that they possessed the strength to resist the combined might of Russia, Germany and France, and so gave in to the ultimatum. At the same time, the Japanese did not abandon their attempts to force Korea into the Japanese sphere of influence. On 8 October 1895, Queen Min of Korea, the leader of the anti-Japanese and pro-Chinese faction at the Korean court was murdered by Japanese agents within the halls of the Gyeongbokgung palace, an act that backfired badly as it turned Korean public opinion against Japan. In early 1896, King Gojong of Korea fled to the Russian legation in Seoul, believing that his life was in danger from Japanese agents, and Russian influence in Korea started to predominate. In the aftermath of the flight of the King, a popular uprising overthrew the pro-Japanese government and several cabinet ministers were lynched in the streets.

In 1897, Russia occupied the Liaodong Peninsula, built the Port Arthur fortress, and based the Russian Pacific Fleet in the port. Russia's acquisition of Port Arthur was primarily an anti-British move to counter the British occupation of Wei-hai-Wei, but in Japan this was perceived as an anti-Japanese move. Germany occupied Jiaozhou Bay, built the Tsingtao fortress, and based the German East Asia Squadron in this port. Between 1897 and 1903, the Russians built the Chinese Eastern Railway (CER) in Manchuria. The Chinese Eastern Railroad was owned jointly by the Russian and Chinese governments, but the company's management was entirely Russian, the line was built to the Russian gauge and Russian troops were stationed in Manchuria to protect rail traffic on the CER from bandit attacks. The headquarters of the CER company was located in the new Russian-built city of Harbin, the "Moscow of the Orient". From 1897 onwards, Manchuria – while still nominally part of the "Great Qing Empire" – started to resemble more and more a Russian province.

=== Russian encroachment ===
In December 1897, a Russian fleet appeared off Port Arthur. After three months, in 1898, China and Russia negotiated a convention by which China leased (to Russia) Port Arthur, Talienwan and the surrounding waters. The two parties further agreed that the convention could be extended by mutual agreement. The Russians clearly expected such an extension, for they lost no time in occupying the territory and in fortifying Port Arthur, their sole warm-water port on the Pacific coast and of great strategic value. A year later, to consolidate their position, the Russians began to build a new railway from Harbin through Mukden to Port Arthur, the South Manchurian Railroad. The development of the railway became a contributory factor to the Boxer Rebellion, when Boxer forces burned the railway stations.

The Russians also began to make inroads into Korea. A large point of Russia's growing influence in Korea was Gojong's internal exile to the Russian legation. A pro-Russian cabinet emerged in the Korean Empire. In 1901, Tsar Nicholas II told Prince Henry of Prussia, "I do not want to seize Korea but under no circumstances can I allow Japan to become firmly established there. That will be a casus belli." By 1898 they had acquired mining and forestry concessions near the Yalu and Tumen rivers, causing the Japanese much anxiety. Japan decided to attack before the Russians completed the Trans-Siberian Railway.

=== Boxer Rebellion ===
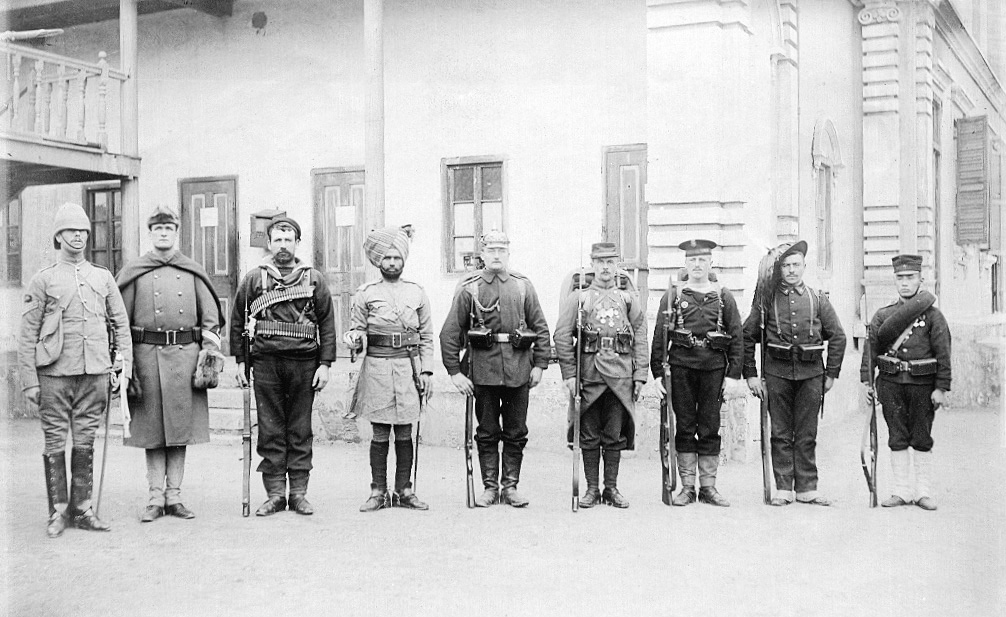
Troops of the Eight-Nation Alliance in 1900. Left to right: Britain, United States, Australia, India, Germany, France, Austria-Hungary, Italy, Japan.

The Russians and the Japanese both contributed troops to the Eight-Nation Alliance sent in 1900 to quell the Boxer Rebellion and to relieve the international legations besieged in the Chinese capital, Beijing. Russia had already sent 177,000 soldiers to Manchuria, nominally to protect its railways under construction. Though the Qing imperial army and the Boxer rebels united to fight against the invasion, they were quickly overrun and ejected from Manchuria. After the Boxer Rebellion, 100,000 Russian soldiers were stationed in Manchuria. The Russian troops settled in and despite assurances they would vacate the area after the crisis, by 1903 the Russians had not established a timetable for withdrawal and had actually strengthened their position in Manchuria.

=== Pre-war negotiations ===
The Japanese statesman Itō Hirobumi started to negotiate with the Russians. He regarded Japan as too weak to evict the Russians militarily, so he proposed giving Russia control over Manchuria in exchange for Japanese control of northern Korea. Of the five Genrō (elder statesmen) who made up the Meiji oligarchy, Itō Hirobumi and Count Inoue Kaoru opposed the idea of war against Russia on financial grounds, while Katsura Tarō, Komura Jutarō and Field Marshal Yamagata Aritomo favored war. Meanwhile, Japan and Britain had signed the Anglo-Japanese Alliance in 1902 – the British seeking to restrict naval competition by keeping the Russian Pacific seaports of Vladivostok and Port Arthur from their full use. Japan's alliance with the British meant, in part, that if any nation allied itself with Russia during any war against Japan, then Britain would enter the war on Japan's side. Russia could no longer count on receiving help from either Germany or France without the danger of British involvement in the war. With such an alliance, Japan felt free to commence hostilities if necessary.

The 1890s and 1900s marked the height of the "Yellow Peril" propaganda by the German government, and the German Emperor Wilhelm II (r. 1888–1918) often wrote letters to his cousin Emperor Nicholas II of Russia, praising him as the "saviour of the white race" and urging Russia forward in Asia. From November 1894 onward, Wilhelm had been writing letters praising Nicholas as Europe's defender from the "Yellow Peril", assuring the Tsar that God Himself had "chosen" Russia to defend Europe from the alleged Asian threat. On 1 November 1902 Wilhelm wrote to Nicholas that "certain symptoms in the East seem to show that Japan is becoming a rather restless customer" and "it is evident to every unbiased mind that Korea must and will be Russian". Wilhelm ended his letter with the warning that Japan and China would soon unite against Europe, writing:

Twenty to thirty million Chinese, supported by a half dozen Japanese divisions, led by competent, intrepid Japanese officers, full of hatred for Christianity – that is a vision of the future that cannot be contemplated without concern, and it is not impossible. On the contrary, it is the realisation of the yellow peril, which I described a few years ago and I was ridiculed by the majority of people for my graphic depiction of it ... Your devoted friend and cousin, Willy, Admiral of the Atlantic.

Wilhelm aggressively encouraged Russia's ambitions in Asia because France, Russia's closest ally since 1894, was less than supportive of Russian expansionism in Asia, and it was believed in Berlin that German support of Russia might break up the Franco-Russian alliance and lead to a new German–Russian alliance. The French had made it clear that they disapproved of Nicholas's forward policy in Asia; the French Premier Maurice Rouvier (in office: May to December 1887) publicly declaring that the Franco-Russian alliance applied only in Europe, not to Asia, and that France would remain neutral if Japan attacked Russia. The American president Theodore Roosevelt (in office 1901–1909), who was attempting to mediate the Russian–Japanese dispute, complained that Wilhelm's "Yellow Peril" propaganda, which strongly implied that Germany might go to war against Japan in support of Russia, encouraged Russian intransigence. On 24 July 1905, in a letter to the British diplomat Cecil Spring Rice, Roosevelt wrote that Wilhelm bore partial responsibility for the war as "he has done all he could to bring it about", charging that Wilhelm's constant warnings about the "Yellow Peril" had made the Russians uninterested in compromise as Nicholas believed that Germany would intervene if Japan attacked.

The implicit promise of German support suggested by Wilhelm's "Yellow Peril" speeches and letters to Nicholas led many decision-makers in Saint Petersburg to believe that Russia's military weaknesses in the Far East (like the uncompleted Trans-Siberian railroad line) did not matter – they assumed that the Reich would come to Russia's assistance if war should come. In fact, neither Wilhelm nor his Chancellor Prince Bernhard von Bülow (in office: 1900–1909) had much interest in East Asia, and Wilhelm's letters to Nicholas praising him as Europe's saviour against the "Yellow Peril" were really meant to provoke change in the balance of power in Europe, as Wilhelm believed that any Russian entanglement with Japan would break up the Franco-Russian alliance and lead to Nicholas signing an alliance with Germany. This was especially the case as Germany had embarked upon the "Tirpitz Plan" and a policy of Weltpolitik (from 1897) meant to challenge Britain's position as the world's leading power. Since Britain was allied to Japan, if Germany could manipulate Russia and Japan into going to war with each other, this in turn would allegedly lead to Russia turning towards Germany.

Furthermore, Wilhelm believed if a Russian–German alliance emerged, France would be compelled to join it. He also hoped that having Russia pursue an expansionist policy in Asia would distract and keep Russia out of the Balkans, thus removing the main source of tension between Russia and Germany's ally Austria-Hungary. During the war, Nicholas, who took at face value Wilhelm's "Yellow Peril" speeches, placed much hope in German intervention on his side. More than once Nicholas chose to continue the war out of the belief that the Kaiser would come to his aid.

Despite previous assurances that Russia would completely withdraw from Manchuria the forces it had sent to crush the Boxer Rebellion by 8 April 1903, that day passed with no reduction in Russian forces in that region. In Japan, university students demonstrated both against Russia and against their own government for not taking any action. On 28 July 1903 Kurino Shin'ichirō, the Japanese minister in Saint Petersburg, was instructed to present his country's view opposing Russia's consolidation plans in Manchuria. On 3 August 1903 the Japanese minister handed in the following document to serve as the basis for further negotiations:

1. Mutual engagement to respect the independence and territorial integrity of the Chinese and Korean empires and to maintain the principle of equal opportunity for the commerce and industry of all nations in those countries.
2. Reciprocal recognition of Japan's preponderating interests in Korea and Russia's special interests in railway enterprises in Manchuria, and of the right of Japan to take in Korea and of Russia to take in Manchuria such measures as may be necessary for the protection of their respective interests as above defined, subject, however, to the provisions of article I of this agreement.
3. Reciprocal undertaking on the part of Russia and Japan not to impede development of those industrial and commercial activities respectively of Japan in Korea and of Russia in Manchuria, which are not inconsistent with the stipulations of article I of this agreement. Additional engagement on the part of Russia not to impede the eventual extension of the Korean railway into southern Manchuria so as to connect with the East China and Shan-hai-kwan–Newchwang lines.
4. Reciprocal engagement that in case it is found necessary to send troops by Japan to Korea, or by Russia to Manchuria, for the purpose either of protecting the interests mentioned in article II of this agreement, or of suppressing insurrection or disorder calculated to create international complications, the troops so sent are in no case to exceed the actual number required and are to be forthwith recalled as soon as their missions are accomplished.
5. Recognition on the part of Russia of the exclusive right of Japan to give advice and assistance in the interest of reform and good government in Korea, including necessary military assistance.
6. This agreement to supplant all previous arrangements between Japan and Russia respecting Korea.

On 3 October 1903 the Russian minister to Japan, Roman Rosen, presented to the Japanese government the Russian counter proposal as the basis of negotiations, as follows:

1. Mutual engagement to respect the independence and territorial integrity of the Korean Empire.
2. Recognition by Russia of Japan's preponderating interests in Korea and of the right of Japan to give advice and assistance to Korea tending to improve the civil administration of the empire without infringing the stipulations of article I.
3. Engagement on the part of Russia not to impede the commercial and industrial undertakings of Japan in Korea, nor to oppose any measures taken for the purpose of protecting them so long as such measures do not infringe the stipulations of article I.
4. Recognition of the right of Japan to send for the same purpose troops to Korea, with the knowledge of Russia, but their number not to exceed that actually required, and with the engagement on the part of Japan to recall such troops as soon as their mission is accomplished.
5. Mutual engagement not to use any part of the territory of Korea for strategical purposes nor to undertake on the coasts of Korea any military works capable of menacing the freedom of navigation in the Straits of Korea.
6. Mutual engagement to consider that part of the territory of Korea lying to the north of the 39th parallel as a neutral zone into which neither of the contracting parties shall introduce troops.
7. Recognition by Japan of Manchuria and its littoral as in all respects outside her sphere of interest.
8. This agreement to supplant all previous agreements between Russia and Japan respecting Korea.

During the Russian–Japanese talks, the Japanese historian Hirono Yoshihiko noted, "once negotiations commenced between Japan and Russia, Russia scaled back its demands and claims regarding Korea bit by bit, making a series of concessions that Japan regarded as serious compromises on Russia's part". The war might not have broken out had not the issues of Korea and Manchuria become linked. The Korean and Manchurian issues had become linked as the Prime Minister of Japan, Katsura Tarō (in office 1901–1906), decided if war did come, that Japan was more likely to have the support of the United States and Great Britain if the war could be presented as a struggle for free trade against the highly protectionist Russian empire, in which case, Manchuria, which was the larger market than Korea, was more likely to engage Anglo-American sympathies. Throughout the war, Japanese propaganda presented the recurring theme of Japan as a "civilized" power (that supported free trade and would implicitly allow foreign businesses into the resource-rich region of Manchuria) vs. Russia the "uncivilized" power (that was protectionist and wanted to keep the riches of Manchuria all to itself).

Emperor Gojong of Korea (King from 1864 to 1897, Emperor from 1897 to 1907) came to believe that the issue dividing Japan and Russia was Manchuria, and chose to pursue a policy of neutrality as the best way of preserving Korean independence as the crisis mounted. In a series of reports to Beijing, Hu Weide, the Chinese ambassador in Saint Petersburg from July 1902 to September 1907, looked closely at whether a Russian or a Japanese victory would be favourable to China, and argued that the latter was preferable, as he maintained a Japanese victory presented the better chance for China to regain sovereignty over Manchuria. In December 1903 China decided to remain neutral if war came, because though Japan was the only power capable of evicting Russia from Manchuria, the extent of Japanese ambitions in Manchuria was not clear to Beijing.

Russian–Japanese negotiations then followed, although by early January 1904 the Japanese government had realised that Russia was not interested in settling the Manchurian or Korean issues. Instead, Russia's goal was buying time – via diplomacy – to further build up militarily. In December 1903, Wilhelm wrote in a marginal note on a diplomatic dispatch about his role in inflaming Russo–Japanese relations:

Since 97 – Kiaochow – we have never left Russia in any doubt that we would cover her back in Europe, in case she decided to pursue a bigger policy in the Far East that might lead to military complications (with the aim of relieving our eastern border from the fearful pressure and threat of the massive Russian army!). Whereupon, Russia took Port Arthur and trusting us, took her fleet out of the Baltic, thereby making herself vulnerable to us by sea. In Danzig 01 and Reval 02, the same assurance was given again, with result that entire Russian divisions from Poland and European Russia were and are being sent to the Far East. This would not had happened if our governments had not been in agreement!

A recurring theme of Wilhelm's letters to Nicholas was that "Holy Russia" had been "chosen" by God to save the "entire white race" from the "Yellow Peril", and that Russia was "entitled" to annex all of Korea, Manchuria, and northern China up to Beijing. Wilhelm went on to assure Nicholas that once Russia had defeated Japan, this would be a deadly blow to British diplomacy, and that the two emperors, the self-proclaimed "Admiral of the Atlantic" and the "Admiral of the Pacific", would rule Eurasia together, making them able to challenge British sea power as the resources of Eurasia would make their empires immune to a British blockade, and thus allowing Germany and Russia to "divide up the best" of the British colonies in Asia between them.

Nicholas had been prepared to compromise with Japan, but after receiving a letter from Wilhelm attacking him as a coward for his willingness to compromise with the Japanese (who, Wilhelm never ceasing reminding Nicholas, represented the "Yellow Peril") for the sake of peace, became more obstinate. Wilhelm had written to Nicholas stating that the question of Russian interests in Manchuria and Korea was beside the point, saying instead it was a matter of Russia:

...undertaking the protection and defence of the White Race, and with it, Christian civilization, against the Yellow Race. And whatever the Japs are determined to ensure the domination of the Yellow Race in East Asia, to put themselves at its head and organise and lead it into battle against the White Race. That is the kernel of the situation, and therefore there can be very little doubt about where the sympathies of all half-way intelligent Europeans should lie. England betrayed Europe's interests to America in a cowardly and shameful way over the Panama Canal question, so as to be left in 'peace' by the Yankees. Will the 'Tsar' likewise betray the interests of the White Race to the Yellow as to be 'left in peace' and not embarrass the Hague tribunal too much?.

When Nicholas replied that he still wanted peace, Wilhelm wrote back in a telegram "You innocent angel!", telling his advisors "This is the language of an innocent angel. But not that of a White Tsar!" Nevertheless, Tokyo believed that Russia was not serious about seeking a peaceful solution to the dispute. On 13 January 1904, Japan proposed a formula by which Manchuria would remain outside Japan's sphere of influence and, reciprocally, Korea outside Russia's. On 21 December 1903, the Katsura cabinet voted to go to war against Russia.

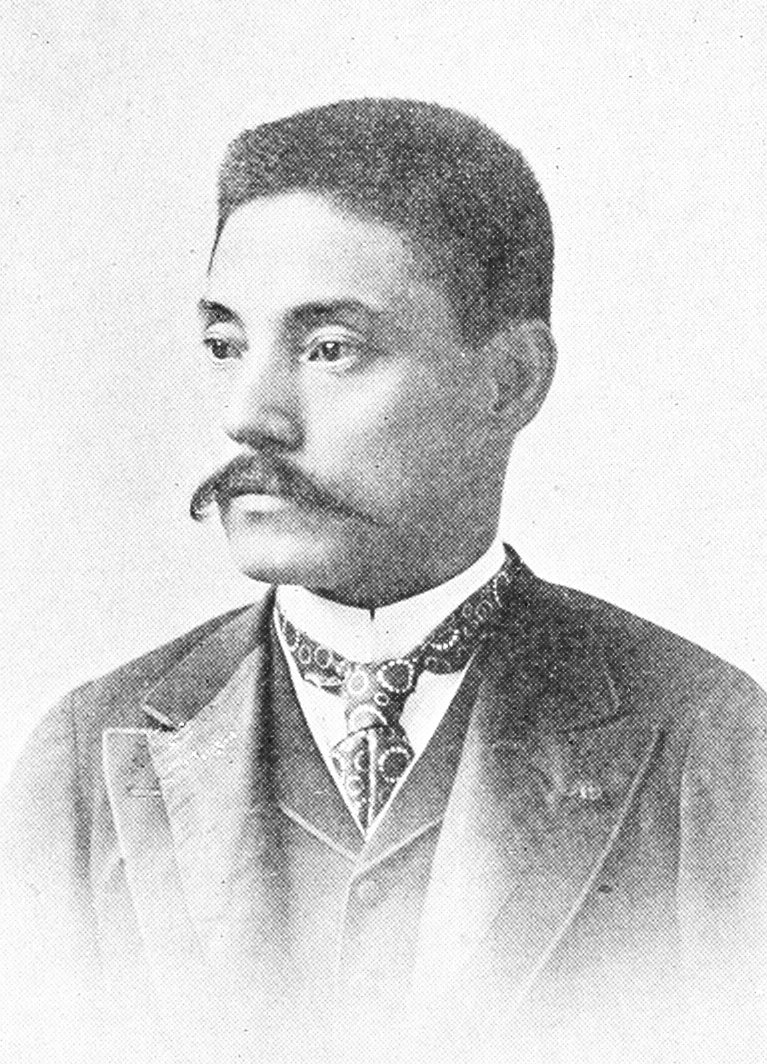
Kurino Shin'ichirō

By 4 February 1904, no formal reply had been received from Saint Petersburg. On 6 February the Japanese minister to Russia, Kurino Shin'ichirō, was recalled, and Japan severed diplomatic relations with Russia.

Potential diplomatic resolution of territorial concerns between Japan and Russia failed; historians have argued that this directly resulted from the actions of Emperor Nicholas II. Crucially, Nicholas mismanaged his government. Although certain scholars contend that the situation arose from the determination of Nicholas II to use the war against Japan to spark a revival in Russian patriotism, no historical evidence supports this claim. The Tsar's advisors did not support the war, foreseeing problems in transporting troops and supplies from European Russia to the East. The Tsar himself repeatedly delayed negotiations with the Japanese government as he believed that he was protected by God and the autocracy. The Japanese understanding of this can be seen in a telegram from Japanese minister of foreign affairs, Komura, to the minister to Russia, in which he stated:

...the Japanese government have at all times during the progress of the negotiations made it a special point to give prompt answers to all propositions of the Russian government. The negotiations have now been pending for no less than four months, and they have not yet reached a stage where the final issue can with certainty be predicted. In these circumstances the Japanese government cannot but regard with grave concern the situation for which the delays in negotiations are largely responsible.

Some scholars have suggested that Nicholas II dragged Japan into war intentionally, in hopes of reviving Russian nationalism. This notion conflicts with a comment made by Nicholas to Kaiser Wilhelm of Germany, saying there would be no war because he "did not wish it". This does not reject the claim that Russia played an aggressive role in the East, which it did; rather, it means that Russia unwisely calculated and supposed that Japan would not go to war against Russia's far larger and seemingly superior navy and army. Nicholas held the Japanese in contempt as "yellow monkeys", and he took for granted that the Japanese would simply yield in the face of Russia's superior power, which thus explains his unwillingness to compromise. Evidence of Russia's false sense of security and superiority to Japan is seen by Russian reference to Japan's choosing war as a big mistake.

== Status of combatants ==
=== Japan ===
Japan had conducted detailed studies of the Russian Far East and Manchuria prior to the war and, as it was mandatory for Japanese officers to speak one foreign language, Japan had access to superior maps during the conflict. The Japanese army relied on conscription, introduced in 1873, to maintain its military strength and to provide a large army in times of war. This system of conscription gave Japan a large pool of reserves to draw upon. The Active army and the 1st line reserve (used to bring the active army to wartime strength) totalled 380,000; the 2nd line reserve contained 200,000; the conscript reserve a further 50,000; and the kokumin (akin to a national guard or militia) 220,000. This amounted to 850,000 trained troops available for service, in addition to 4,250,000 men in the untrained reserve.

Immediately available to Japan on the declaration of war were 257,000 infantry, 11,000 cavalry and 894 pieces of artillery. These figures were divided between the Imperial Guards division, 12 regular divisions, 2 cavalry brigades, 2 artillery brigades, 13 reserve brigades, depot troops and the garrison of Taiwan. A regular Japanese division contained 11,400 infantry, 430 cavalry and 36 guns – the guns being organised into batteries of 6. Though another 4 divisions and 4 reserve brigades were formed in 1904, no further formations were created as the reserves were used to replace losses sustained in combat. Japanese reserves were given a full year of training before entering combat, though as the war progressed this was reduced to 6 months due to high casualties. The Japanese army did not follow the European convention of implementing Corps, thus there were no corps troops or command and the Japanese divisions were immediately subordinate to armies.

Olender gives a different appraisal of Japanese strength, maintaining that there were 350,000 men of the standing army and 1st reserve, with an additional 850,000 trained men in reserve, creating a total trained force of 1,200,000 men. The breakdown of the Japanese standing army was different too, with Olender giving each Japanese division 19,000 men including auxiliary troops; he also states that the 13 reserve brigades contained 8,000 men each and mentions 20 fortress battalions, which is omitted by Connaughton. It is further stated that the Japanese army possessed 1,080 field guns and between 120 and 150 heavy guns at the war's commencement. Japanese cavalry was not considered the elite of the army as was the case in Russia; instead Japanese cavalry primarily acted as scouts and fought dismounted, armed with carbine and sword; this was reflected in the fact that each cavalry brigade contained 6 machine guns.

=== Russia ===
There is no consensus over how many Russian troops were present in the Far East around the time of the commencement of the war. One estimate states that the Russian army possessed 60,000 infantry, 3,000 cavalry and 164 guns, mostly at Vladivostok and Port Arthur with a portion at Harbin. This was reinforced by the middle of February to 95,000 with 45,000 at Vladivostok, 8,000 at Harbin, 9,000 at Haicheng, 11,000 on the Yalu River and 22,000 at Port Arthur.

Olender gives the figure at 100,000 men including 42 infantry divisions, fortress troops and support troops. The entire Russian army in 1904 amounted to 1,200,000 men in 29 Corps. The Russian plan was immensely flawed as the Russians possessed only 24,000 potential reinforcements east of Lake Baikal when the war commenced. They would be reinforced by 35,000 men after 4 months and a further 60,000 men 10 months after the commencement of the war at which point they would take the offensive. This plan was based on the erroneous belief that the Japanese army could only mobilise 400,000 with them being unable to field more than 250,000 in an operational sense and 80,000–100,000 of their operational strength being necessary to secure supply lines and therefore only 150,000–170,000 Japanese soldiers would be available for field action. The possibility of Port Arthur being taken was dismissed entirely.

An alternative figure for forces in the Far East is given at over 150,000 men and 266 guns, with Vladivostok and Port Arthur containing a combined force of 45,000 men and with an additional 55,000 engaged in guarding lines of communication, leaving only 50,000 troops to take the field.

Unlike the Japanese, the Russians did utilise the Corps system and in fact maintained two distinct styles of Corps: the European and the Siberian. The two corps both possessed two divisions and their corresponding troop numbers, but a Siberian Division was much smaller, containing only 3,400 men and 20 guns, with a corps containing around 12,000 men and lacking both artillery and divisional guns. Russia only possessed two Siberian Corps, both unprepared for war. After war was declared, this number was raised to seven as the conflict progressed. The European Corps in comparison contained 28,000 soldiers and 112 guns with 6 such corps sent to the Far East during the war – a further three being dispatched that did not arrive before the war ended.

Russian Logistics were hampered by the fact that the only connection to European Russia was the Trans-Siberian Railway, which remained incomplete as the railway was not connected at Lake Baikal. A single train would take between 15 and 40 days to traverse the railway, with the common figure being closer to 40 days. A single battalion would take a month to transport from Moscow to Shenyang. After the line's eventual completion, 20 trains ran daily and by the conclusion of the war some 410,000 soldiers, 93,000 horses and 1,000 guns had been transported.

The tactics utilised by the Russians were outdated. Russian infantry still held to the maxim of Suvorov over a century after his death. The Russian command still used strategies from the Crimean war, attacking en echelon across a wide front in closed formations; it was not uncommon for Russian higher command to bypass their intermediate commanders and issue orders directly to battalions, thus creating confusion during combat.

=== Ship distribution ===
Distribution of naval assets
Ship type	Baltic	Pacific	Black Sea	Total Russia	Japan
Battleships	6 (5)	7	8	21(5)	7
Coastal Defence Battleships	3			3	1
Ironclads	4				1
Armoured Cruisers	4	4		8	8
Cruisers	5(3)	7	1(2)	13(5)	16(2)
Cruisers under 2000t	5	3		8	10
Torpedo gunboats	4	2	3	9	1
Gunboats	8	7	8	23	7
Destroyers	18(4)	25	8	51(4)	19(3)
Torpedo Boats	53(1)	25	6(7)	80(1)	77(8)
Torpedo Boats below 40t	73	7	2	82	

== Declaration of war ==
Japan issued a declaration of war on 8 February 1904. However, three hours before Japan's declaration of war was received by the Russian government, and without warning, the Imperial Japanese Navy attacked the Russian Far East Fleet at Port Arthur.

Tsar Nicholas II was stunned by news of the attack. He could not believe that Japan would commit an act of war without a formal declaration, and had been assured by his ministers that the Japanese would not fight. When the attack came, according to Cecil Spring Rice, first secretary at the British Embassy, it left the Tsar "almost incredulous". The Tsar declared war on Japan eight days after the attack. Japan, in response, made reference to the Russian attack on Sweden in 1808 without declaration of war, although the requirement to mediate disputes between states before commencing hostilities was made international law in 1899, and again in 1907, with the Hague Conventions of 1899 and 1907.

The Principality of Montenegro also declared war on Japan in gratitude for Russia's political support of the Montenegrin prince. The gesture was symbolic and no soldiers from the army were ever deployed in the far East but a few Montenegrins volunteered and joined the Russian army.

The Qing Empire favoured the Japanese position and even offered military aid, but Japan declined it. However, Yuan Shikai sent envoys to Japanese generals several times to deliver foodstuffs and alcoholic drinks. Native Manchurians joined the war on both sides as hired troops.

== Campaign of 1904 ==
Port Arthur, on the Liaodong Peninsula in the south of Manchuria, had been fortified into a major naval base by the Russian Imperial Army. Since it needed to control the sea in order to fight a war on the Asian mainland, Japan's first military objective was to neutralize the Russian fleet at Port Arthur.

=== Battle of Port Arthur ===
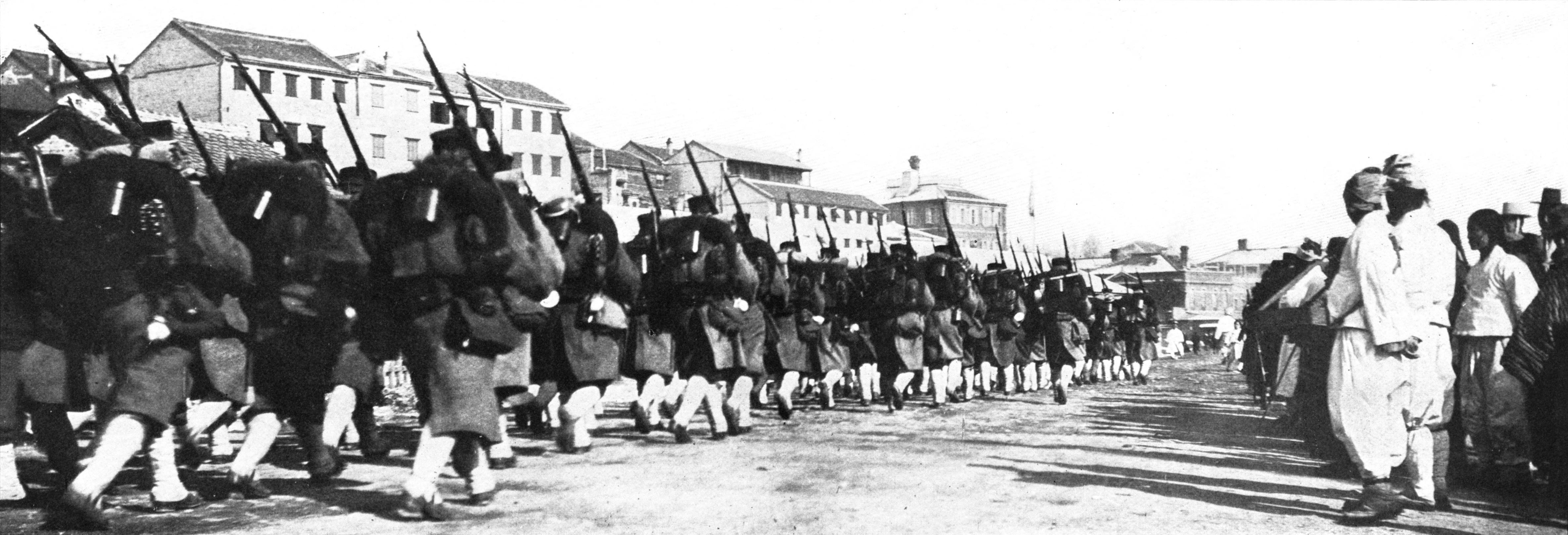
Japanese infantry during the occupation of Seoul, Korea, in 1904

On the night of 8 February 1904, the Japanese fleet under Admiral Tōgō Heihachirō opened the war with a surprise torpedo boat destroyer attack on the Russian ships at Port Arthur. The attack heavily damaged the Tsesarevich and Retvizan, the heaviest battleships in Russia's Far Eastern theatre, and the 6,600 ton protected cruiser Pallada. These attacks developed into the Battle of Port Arthur the next morning. A series of indecisive naval engagements followed, in which Admiral Tōgō was unable to attack the Russian fleet successfully as it was protected by the shore batteries of the harbour, and the Russians were reluctant to leave the harbour for the open seas, especially after the death of Admiral Stepan Osipovich Makarov from a naval mine on 13 April 1904. Although the actual Battle of Port Arthur was indecisive, the initial attacks had a devastating psychological effect on Russia, which had been confident about the prospect of war. The Japanese had seized the initiative while the Russians waited in port.

These engagements provided cover for a Japanese landing near Incheon in Korea. From Incheon the Japanese occupied Hanseong and then the rest of Korea. By the end of April, the Japanese Imperial Army under Kuroki Tamemoto was ready to cross the Yalu River into Russian-occupied Manchuria.

=== Blockade of Port Arthur ===
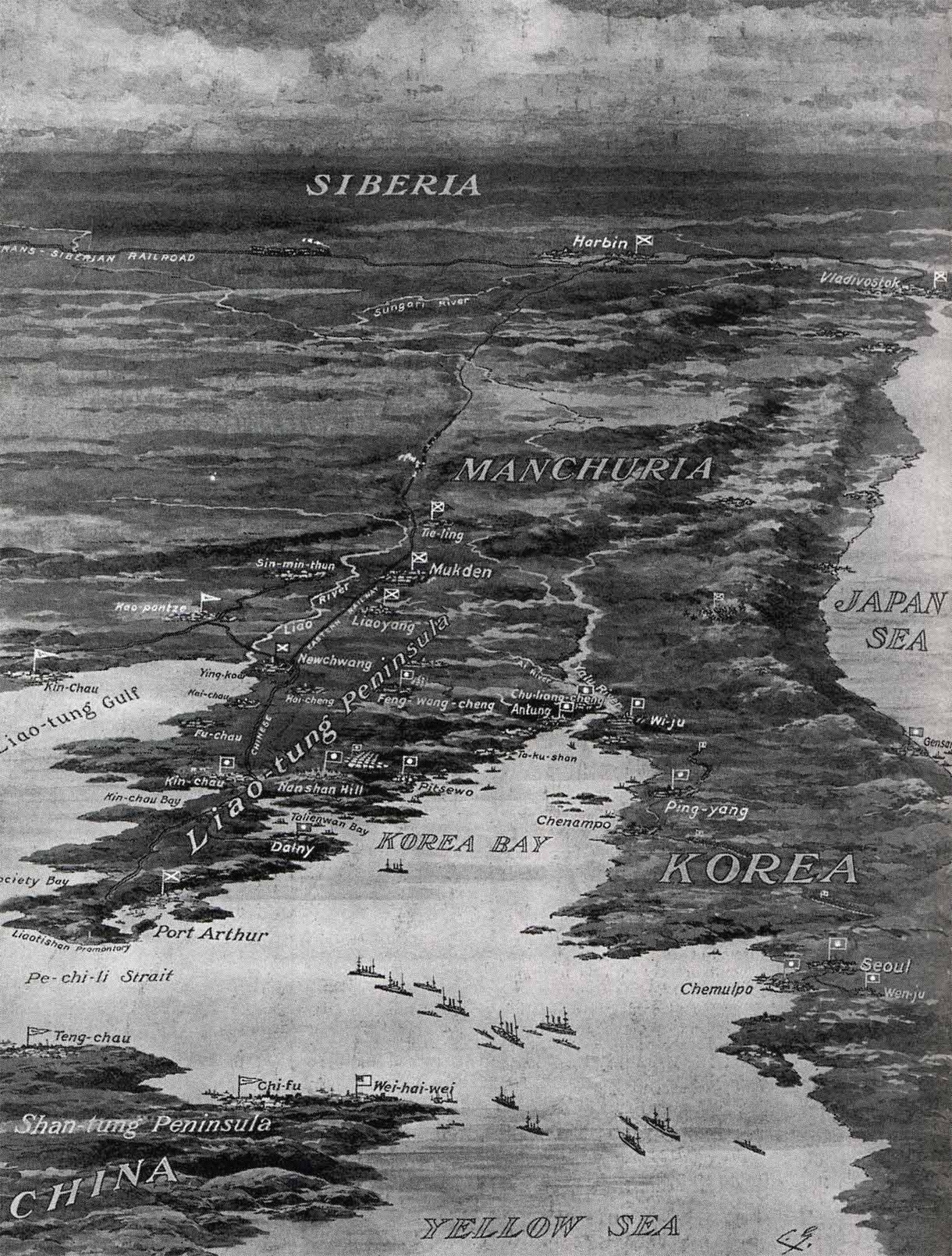
Battlefields in the Russo–Japanese War

The Japanese attempted to deny the Russians use of Port Arthur. During the night of 13–14 February, the Japanese attempted to block the entrance to Port Arthur by sinking several concrete-filled steamers in the deep water channel to the port, but they sank too deep to be effective. A similar attempt to block the harbour entrance during the night of 3–4 May also failed. In March, the charismatic Vice Admiral Makarov had taken command of the First Russian Pacific Squadron with the intention of breaking out of the Port Arthur blockade.

On 12 April 1904, two Russian pre-dreadnought battleships, the flagship Petropavlovsk and the Pobeda, slipped out of port but struck Japanese mines off Port Arthur. The Petropavlovsk sank almost immediately, while the Pobeda had to be towed back to port for extensive repairs.

On 15 April 1904, the Russian government made overtures threatening to seize the British war correspondents who were taking the ship SS Haimun into war zones to report for the London-based Times newspaper, citing concerns about the possibility of the British giving away Russian positions to the Japanese fleet.

The Russians quickly learned, and soon employed, the Japanese tactic of offensive minelaying. On 15 May 1904, two Japanese battleships, the Yashima and the Hatsuse, were lured into a recently laid Russian minefield off Port Arthur, each striking at least two mines. The Hatsuse sank within minutes, taking 450 sailors with her, while the Yashima sank while under tow towards Korea for repairs. On 23 June 1904, a breakout attempt by the Russian squadron, now under the command of Admiral Wilgelm Vitgeft, failed. By the end of the month, Japanese artillery were firing shells into the harbour.

=== Siege of Port Arthur ===
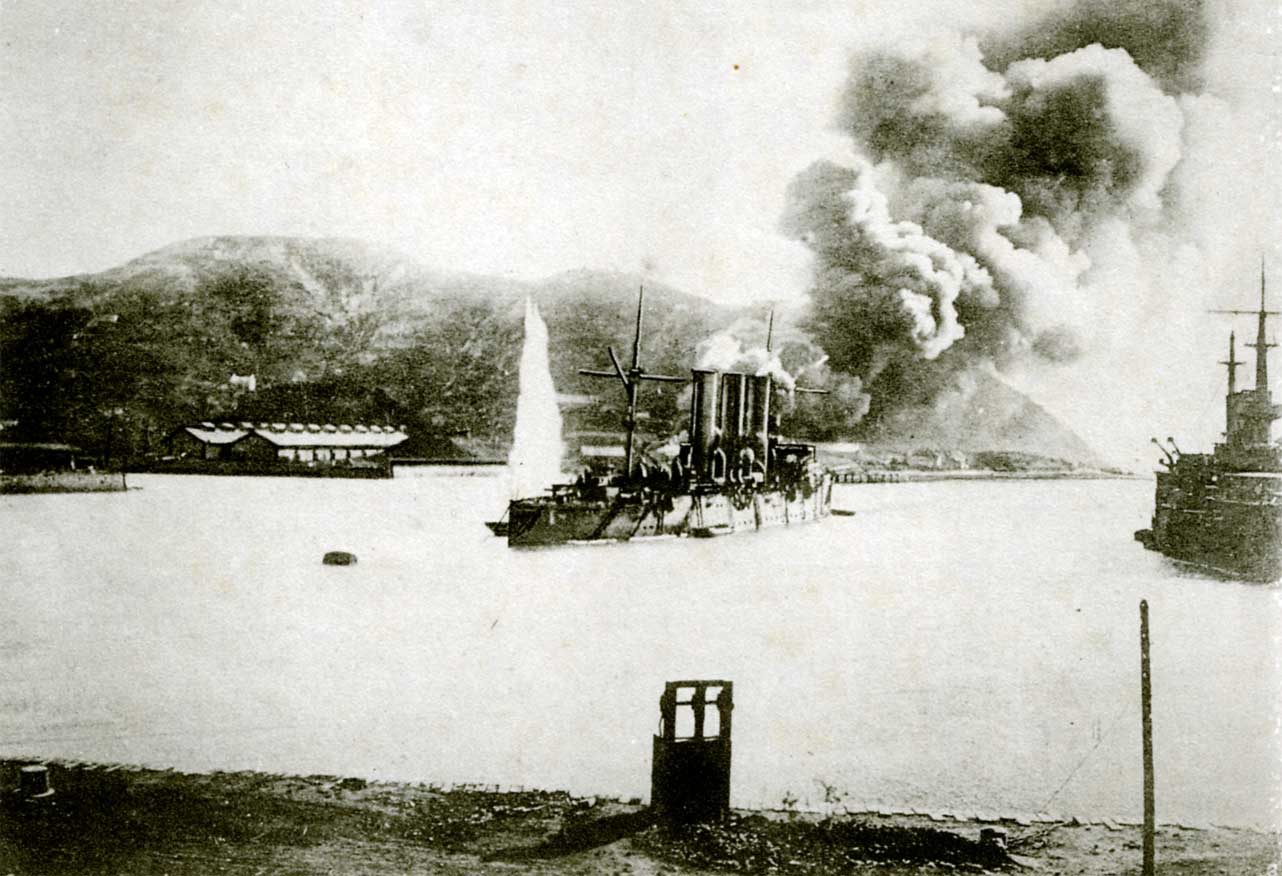
Bombardment during the siege of Port Arthur

The siege of Port Arthur commenced in April 1904. Japanese troops tried numerous frontal assaults on the fortified hilltops overlooking the harbour, which were defeated with Japanese casualties in the thousands. With the aid of several batteries of 11-inch (280 mm) L/10 howitzers, the Japanese were eventually able to capture the key hilltop bastion in December 1904. With a spotter at the end of a phone line located at this vantage point, the long-range artillery was able to shell the Russian fleet, which was unable to retaliate against the land-based artillery invisible over the other side of the hilltop, and was unable or unwilling to sail out against the blockading fleet. Four Russian battleships and two cruisers were sunk in succession, with the fifth and last battleship being forced to scuttle a few weeks later. Thus, all capital ships of the Russian fleet in the Pacific were sunk. This is probably the only example in military history when such a scale of devastation was achieved by land-based artillery against major warships.

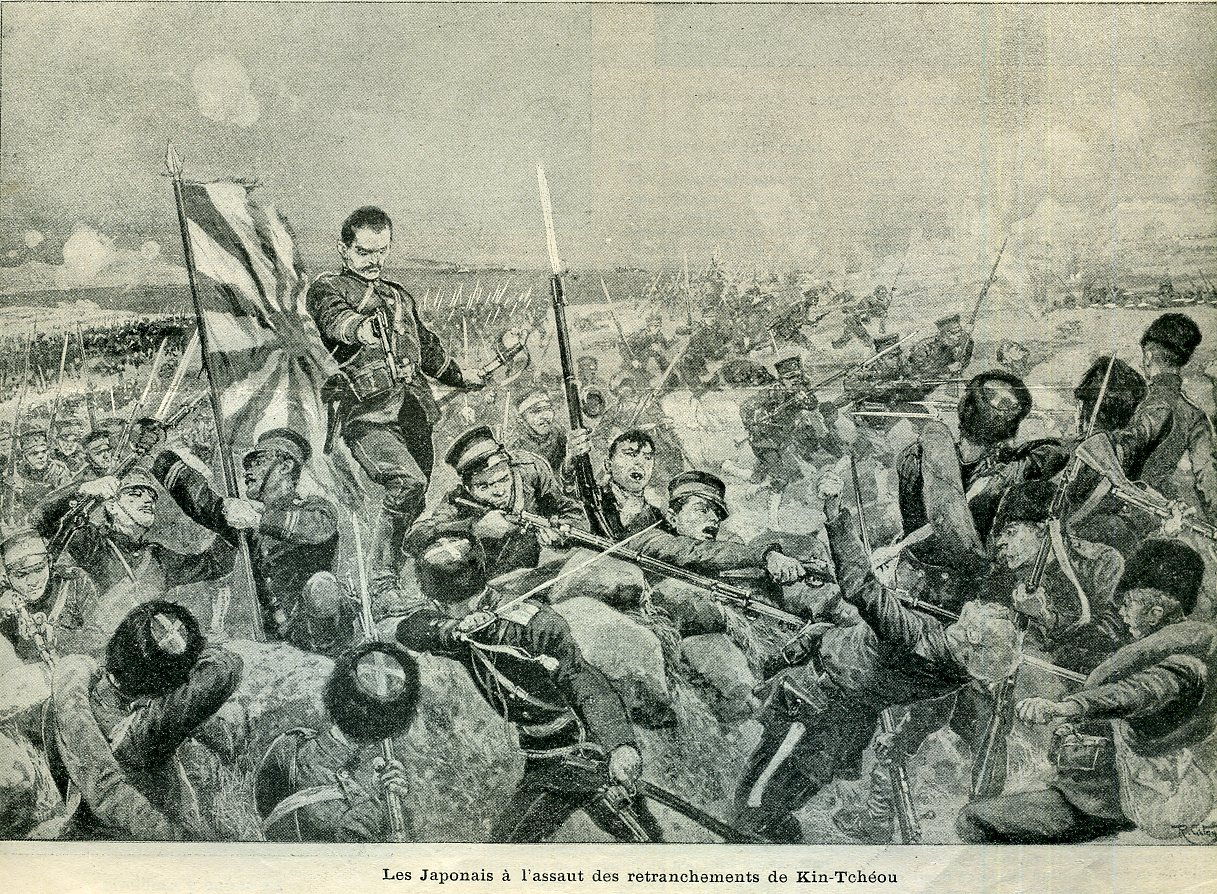
Japanese assault on the entrenched Russian forces, 1904

Meanwhile, attempts to relieve the besieged city by land also failed, and, after the Battle of Liaoyang in late August, the northern Russian force that might have been able to relieve Port Arthur retreated to Mukden (Shenyang). Major General Anatoly Stessel, commander of the Port Arthur garrison, believed that the purpose of defending the city was lost after the fleet had been destroyed. In general, the Russian defenders were suffering disproportionate casualties each time the Japanese attacked. In particular, several large underground mines were exploded in late December, resulting in the costly capture of a few more pieces of the defensive line. Stessel, therefore, decided to surrender to the surprised Japanese generals on 2 January 1905. He made his decision without consulting either the other military staff present, or the Tsar and military command, all of whom disagreed with the decision. Stessel was convicted by a court-martial in 1908 and sentenced to death on account of an incompetent defense and for disobeying orders. He was later pardoned.

=== Anglo–Japanese intelligence co-operation ===
Even before the war, British and Japanese intelligence had co-operated against Russia due to the Anglo-Japanese Alliance. During the war, Indian Army stations in Malaya and China often intercepted and read wireless and telegraph cable traffic relating to the war, which was shared with the Japanese. In their turn, the Japanese shared information about Russia with the British with one British official writing of the "perfect quality" of Japanese intelligence. In particular, British and Japanese intelligence gathered much evidence that Germany was supporting Russia in the war as part of a bid to disturb the balance of power in Europe, which led to British officials increasingly perceiving Germany as a threat to the international order.

=== Battle of Yalu River ===
In contrast to the Japanese strategy of rapidly gaining ground to control Manchuria, Russian strategy focused on fighting delaying actions to gain time for reinforcements to arrive via the long Trans-Siberian Railway, which was incomplete near Irkutsk at the time. On 1 May 1904, the Battle of Yalu River became the first major land battle of the war; Japanese troops stormed a Russian position led by General Mikhail Zasulich after crossing the river. The defeat of the Russian Eastern Detachment removed the perception that the Japanese would be an easy enemy, that the war would be short, and that Russia would be the overwhelming victor. This was also the first battle in decades to be an Asian victory over a European power and marked Russia's inability to match Japan's military prowess. Japanese troops proceeded to land at several points on the Manchurian coast, and in a series of engagements, drove the Russians back towards Port Arthur. The subsequent battles, including the Battle of Nanshan on 25 May 1904, were marked by heavy Japanese losses largely from attacking entrenched Russian positions.

=== Battle of the Yellow Sea ===
With the death of Admiral Stepan Makarov during the siege of Port Arthur in April 1904, Admiral Wilgelm Vitgeft was appointed commander of the battle fleet and was ordered to make a sortie from Port Arthur and deploy his force to Vladivostok. Flying his flag in the French-built pre-dreadnought Tsesarevich, Vitgeft proceeded to lead his six battleships, four cruisers, and 14 torpedo boat destroyers into the Yellow Sea in the early morning of 10 August 1904. Waiting for him was Admiral Tōgō and his fleet of four battleships, 10 cruisers, and 18 torpedo boat destroyers.

At approximately 12:15, the battleship fleets obtained visual contact with each other, and at 13:00 with Tōgō crossing Vitgeft's T, they commenced main battery fire at a range of about eight miles, the longest ever conducted up to that time. For about thirty minutes the battleships pounded one another until they had closed to less than four miles and began to bring their secondary batteries into play. At 18:30, a hit from one of Tōgō's battleships struck Vitgeft's flagship's bridge, killing him instantly.

With the Tsesarevich's helm jammed and their admiral killed in action, she turned from her battle line, causing confusion among her fleet. However, Tōgō was determined to sink the Russian flagship and continued pounding her, but she was saved by the gallant charge of the American-built Russian battleship Retvizan, whose captain successfully drew away Tōgō's heavy fire from the Russian flagship. Knowing of the impending battle with the battleship reinforcements arriving from Russia (the Baltic Fleet), Tōgō chose not to risk his battleships by pursuing his enemy as they turned about and headed back into Port Arthur, thus ending naval history's longest-range gunnery duel up to that time and the first modern clash of steel battleship fleets on the high seas.

=== Baltic Fleet redeploys ===
Route of Baltic Fleet

Meanwhile, the Russians were preparing to reinforce their Far East Fleet by sending the Baltic Fleet, under the command of Admiral Zinovy Rozhestvensky. After a false start caused by engine problems and other mishaps, the squadron finally departed on 15 October 1904, and sailed halfway around the world from the Baltic Sea to the Pacific via the Cape Route around the Cape of Good Hope in the course of a seven-month odyssey that was to attract worldwide attention.

The Dogger Bank incident on 21 October 1904, where the Russian fleet fired on British fishing boats that they mistook for Japanese torpedo boats, nearly sparked a war with the United Kingdom (an ally of Japan, but neutral, unless provoked). The British pressured the French and Portuguese not to let the Russians fleet in their colonial ports to recoal, forcing the Russians to coal in the open ocean or at anchorages which was much more inefficient. Being denied docking at ports also exacerbated existing problems in the fleet, such as rotting food supplies, irregular mail delivery, and lack of shore leave. All of these plus the long voyage further sapped Russia sailors' health and morale, so for the upcoming battle they would be facing Japanese sailors who were well-rested by contrast.

Concerns that the draught of the newer battleships, which had proven to be considerably greater than designed, would prevent their passage through the Suez Canal caused the fleet to separate after leaving Tangiers on 3 November 1904. These concerns though may have been an excuse to hide worries over passing through British controlled waters. The newer battleships and a few cruisers proceeded around the Cape of Good Hope under Rozhestvensky while the older battleships and lighter cruisers passed through the Suez Canal under the command of Admiral Dmitry Gustavovich von Fölkersahm. Both sections of the fleet then rendezvoused at Madagascar as planned.

=== Effects on civilians ===
During the fighting in Manchuria, there were Russian troops that looted and burned Chinese villages, raped women and killed those who resisted or did not understand what they wanted. The Russian justification for all this was that Chinese civilians, being Asian, must have been helping their fellow Asians (the Japanese) inflict defeat on the Russians, and therefore deserved to be punished. The Russian troops were gripped by the fear of the "Yellow Peril", and saw all Asians, not just the Japanese, as the enemy.

The Russian soldiers were much feared by the Chinese population of Manchuria, but it was the Cossacks whom they feared the most on the account of their brutality and insatiable desire to loot. Largely because of the more disciplined behavior of the Japanese, the Han and Manchu population of Manchuria tended to be pro-Japanese. Russian soldiers also reportedly raped Korean women, for example in the city of Chongju. The Japanese were also prone to looting, albeit in a considerably less brutal manner than the Russians, and summarily executed any Chinese or Manchu whom they suspected of being spies. The city of Liaoyang had the misfortune to be sacked three times within three days: first by the Russians, then by the Chinese police, and finally by the Japanese.

The Japanese hired Chinese bandits known variously as the honghuzi, hunghutze, or khunkhuzy to engage in guerrilla warfare by attacking Russian supply columns. Only once did the honghuzi attack Japanese forces, and that attack was apparently motivated by the honghuzi mistaking the Japanese forces for a Russian one. Zhang Zuolin, a prominent bandit leader and the future "Old Marshal" who would rule Manchuria as a warlord between 1916 and 1928, worked as a honghuzi for the Japanese. Manchuria was still officially part of the Chinese Empire, and the Chinese civil servants tried their best to be neutral as Russian and Japanese troops marched across Manchuria.

In the parts of Manchuria occupied by the Japanese, Tokyo appointed "civil governors" who worked to improve health, sanitation and the state of the roads. These activities were also self-interested, as improved roads lessened Japanese logistics problems while improved health amongst the Chinese lessened the dangers of diseases infecting the Japanese troops. By contrast, the Russians made no effort to improve sanitation or health amongst the Chinese, and destroyed everything when they retreated. Many Chinese tended to see the Japanese as the lesser evil.

== Campaign of 1905 ==
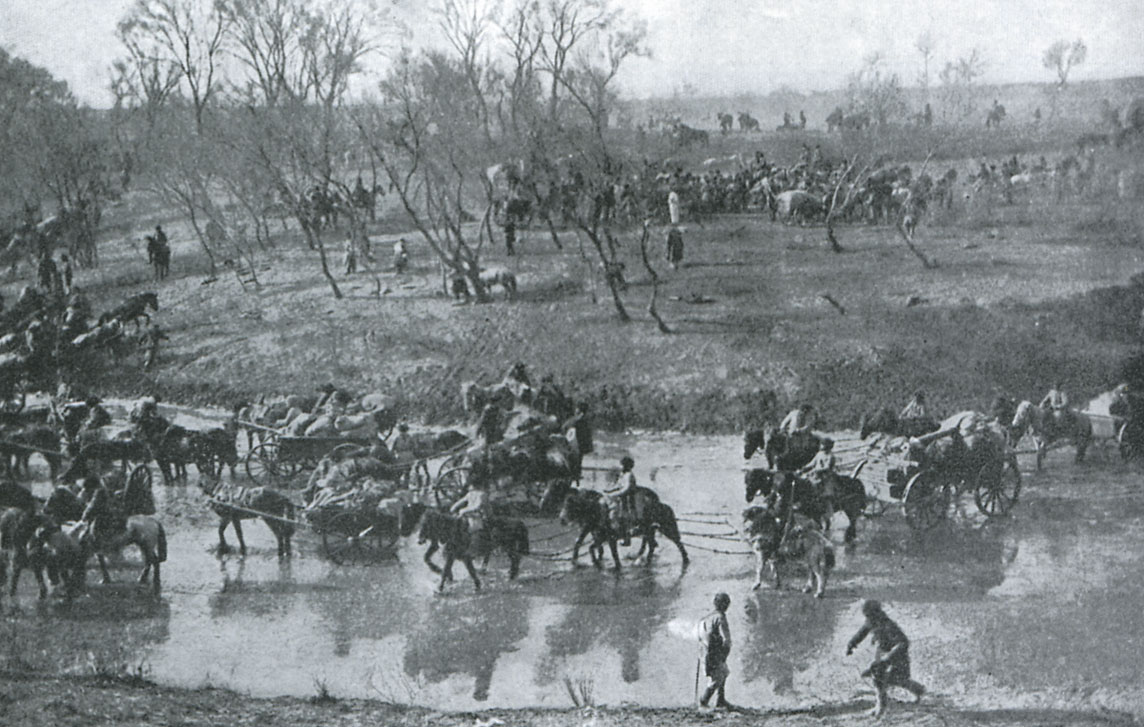
Retreat of Russian soldiers after the Battle of Mukden

With the fall of Port Arthur, the Japanese 3rd Army could continue northward to reinforce positions south of Russian-held Mukden. With the onset of the severe Manchurian winter, there had been no major land engagements since the Battle of Shaho the previous year. The two sides camped opposite each other along 60 to 70 miles (110 km) of front lines south of Mukden.

=== Battle of Sandepu ===
The Russian Second Army under General Oskar Gripenberg, between 25 and 29 January, attacked the Japanese left flank near the town of Sandepu, almost breaking through. This caught the Japanese by surprise. However, without support from other Russian units the attack stalled, Gripenberg was ordered to halt by Kuropatkin and the battle was inconclusive. The Japanese knew that they needed to destroy the Russian army in Manchuria before Russian reinforcements arrived via the Trans-Siberian railroad.

=== Battle of Mukden ===
An illustration of a Japanese assault during the Battle of Mukden

The Battle of Mukden commenced on 20 February 1905. In the following days Japanese forces proceeded to assault the right and left flanks of Russian forces surrounding Mukden, along a 50-mile (80 km) front. Approximately half a million men were involved in the fighting. Both sides were well entrenched and were backed by hundreds of artillery pieces. After days of harsh fighting, added pressure from the flanks forced both ends of the Russian defensive line to curve backwards.

Seeing they were about to be encircled, the Russians began a general retreat, fighting a series of fierce rearguard actions, which soon deteriorated in the confusion and collapse of Russian forces. On 10 March 1905, after three weeks of fighting, General Kuropatkin decided to withdraw to the north of Mukden. The Russians suffered an estimated 90,000 casualties in the battle.

The retreating Russian Manchurian Army formations disbanded as fighting units, but the Japanese failed to destroy them completely. The Japanese themselves had suffered heavy casualties and were in no condition to pursue. Although the Battle of Mukden was a major defeat for the Russians and was the most decisive land battle ever fought by the Japanese, the final victory still depended on the navy.

=== Battle of Tsushima ===
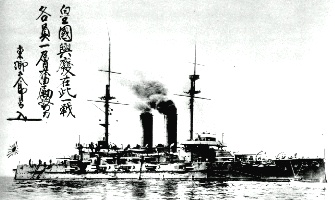
Japanese battleship Mikasa, the flagship of Admiral Tōgō Heihachirō at the Battle of Tsushima

After a stopover of several weeks at the minor port of Nossi-Bé, Madagascar, that had been reluctantly allowed by neutral France in order not to jeopardize its relations with its Russian ally, the Russian Baltic fleet proceeded to Cam Ranh Bay in French Indochina passing on its way through the Singapore Strait between 7 and 10 April 1905. The fleet finally reached the Sea of Japan in May 1905.

The logistics of such an undertaking in the age of coal power was astounding. The squadron required approximately 500,000 tons of coal to complete the journey, yet by international law, it was not allowed to coal at neutral ports, forcing the Russian authorities to acquire a large fleet of colliers to supply the fleet at sea. The weight of the ships' stores needed for such a long journey was to be another major problem.

The fleet, now renamed the Second Pacific Squadron sailed 18,000 nautical miles (33,000 km) to relieve Port Arthur, only to hear the demoralizing news that Port Arthur had fallen while it was still at Madagascar. Admiral Rozhestvensky's only hope now was to reach the port of Vladivostok. There were three routes to Vladivostok, with the shortest and most direct passing through Tsushima Strait between Korea and Japan. However, this was also the most dangerous route as it passed between the Japanese home islands and the Japanese naval bases in Korea.

Admiral Tōgō was aware of Russian progress and understood that, with the fall of Port Arthur, the Second and Third Pacific squadrons would try to reach the only other Russian port in the Far East, Vladivostok. Battle plans were laid down and ships were repaired and refitted to intercept the Russian fleet.

The Japanese Combined Fleet, which had originally consisted of six battleships, was now down to four battleships and one second class battleship (two had been lost to mines), but still retained its cruisers, destroyers, and torpedo boats. The Russian Second Pacific Squadron contained eight battleships, including four new battleships of the Borodino class, as well as cruisers, destroyers and other auxiliaries for a total of 38 ships.

By the end of May, the Second Pacific Squadron was on the last leg of its journey to Vladivostok, taking the shorter, riskier route between Korea and Japan, and travelling at night to avoid discovery. Unfortunately for the Russians, in compliance with the rules of war, the two trailing hospital ships had continued to burn their lights, which were spotted by the Japanese armed merchant cruiser Shinano Maru. Wireless communication was used to inform Togo's headquarters, whereupon the Combined Fleet was immediately ordered to sortie. Still receiving reports from scouting forces, the Japanese were able to position their fleet to "cross the T" of the Russian fleet.

The Japanese engaged the Russians in the Tsushima Straits on 27–28 May 1905. The Russian fleet was virtually annihilated, losing eight battleships, numerous smaller vessels, and more than 5,000 men, while the Japanese lost three torpedo boats and 116 men. Only three Russian vessels escaped to Vladivostok, while six others were interned in neutral ports. After the Battle of Tsushima, a combined Japanese Army and Navy operation commanded by Admiral Kataoka Shichirō occupied Sakhalin Island to force the Russians into suing for peace.

== Peace and aftermath ==
=== Treaty of Portsmouth ===
Negotiating the Treaty of Portsmouth (1905). From left to right: the Russians at far side of table are Korostovetz, Nabokov, Witte, Rosen, Plancon; and the Japanese at near side of table are Adachi, Ochiai, Komura, Takahira, Satō. The large conference table is today preserved at the Museum Meiji-mura in Inuyama, Aichi Prefecture, Japan.

==== Lead-up to negotiations ====
Military leaders and senior tsarist officials agreed before the war that Russia was a much stronger nation and had little to fear from the Empire of Japan. The fanatical zeal of the Japanese infantrymen astonished the Russians, who were dismayed by the apathy, backwardness, and defeatism of their own soldiers. Russian soldiers fought fiercely but this was contrasted by the cautiousness of their officers, who sometimes chose to retreat without a good reason, and the Russian commander Kuropatkin on two occasions prohibited his subordinates from counter-attacking the Japanese.

In both of the major battles in the fall of 1904 (Liaoyang and Shaho), Kuropatkin ordered a withdrawal. As a result of this leadership the Russians were always reacting to the Japanese rather than taking the initiative. After the loss of Russia's main supply base and headquarters at Mukden, Kuropatkin was relieved of command, and his replacement, Linevich, planned on going on the offensive but peace talks began before then.

The Russian mobilization was initially of older reservists, with less training (some having no experience with the Mosin-Nagant rifle) and no interest in the war in the Far East. It was not until after the Battle of Mukden that new recruits and younger reservists began arriving, and by the summer of 1905 the Russian army fielded almost one million well-equipped and -trained soldiers in the Far East against an exhausted Japanese army, but the naval defeat at Tsushima made negotiations more desired.

The defeats of the Army and Navy shook Russian confidence. Throughout 1905, the Imperial Russian government was rocked by revolution. The population was against escalation of the war. The empire was certainly capable of sending more troops, but this would make little difference in the outcome due to the poor state of the economy, the embarrassing defeats of the Russian Army and Navy by the Japanese, and the relative unimportance to Russia of the disputed land, which made the war extremely unpopular.

==== Treaty negotiations ====
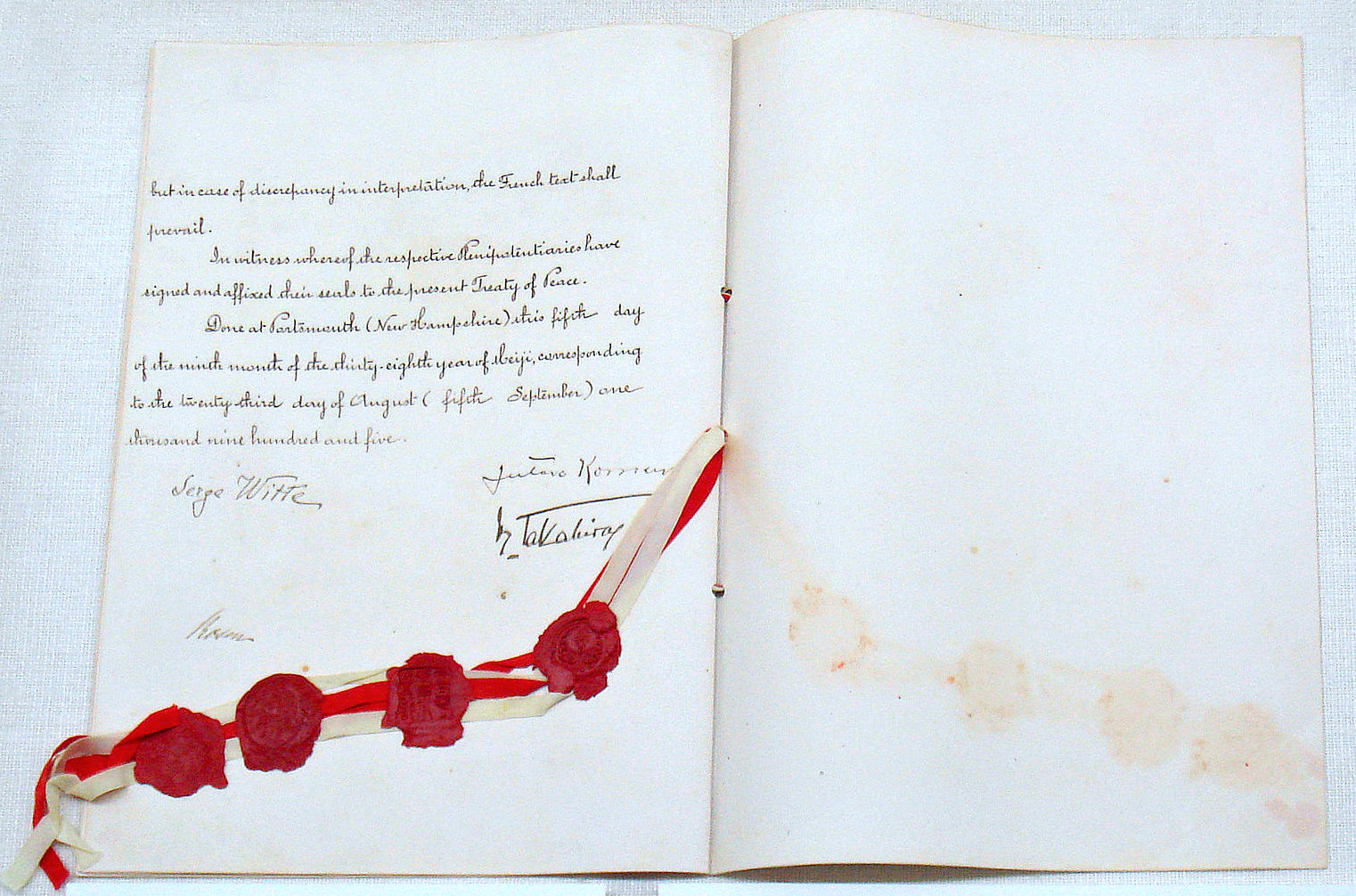
Japan-Russia Treaty of Peace, 5 September 1905

Both sides accepted the offer of United States president Theodore Roosevelt to mediate. Meetings were held in Portsmouth, New Hampshire, with Sergei Witte leading the Russian delegation and Baron Komura leading the Japanese delegation. The Treaty of Portsmouth was signed on 5 September 1905 at the Portsmouth Naval Shipyard. Witte became Russian Prime Minister the same year.

After courting the Japanese, Roosevelt decided to support the Tsar's refusal to pay indemnities, a move that policymakers in Tokyo interpreted as signifying that the United States had more than a passing interest in Asian affairs. Russia recognized Korea as part of the Japanese sphere of influence and agreed to evacuate Manchuria. Japan would annex Korea in 1910 (Japan–Korea Treaty of 1910), with scant protest from other powers. From 1910 until the end of its rule of Korea in 1945, the Japanese adopted a strategy of using the Korean Peninsula as a gateway to the Asian continent and making Korea's economy subordinate to Japanese economic interests.

Russia also signed over its 25-year leasehold rights to Port Arthur, including the naval base and the peninsula around it, and ceded the southern half of Sakhalin Island to Japan. Sakhalin would be taken back by the Soviet Union following the defeat of the Japanese in World War II.

=== Casualties ===
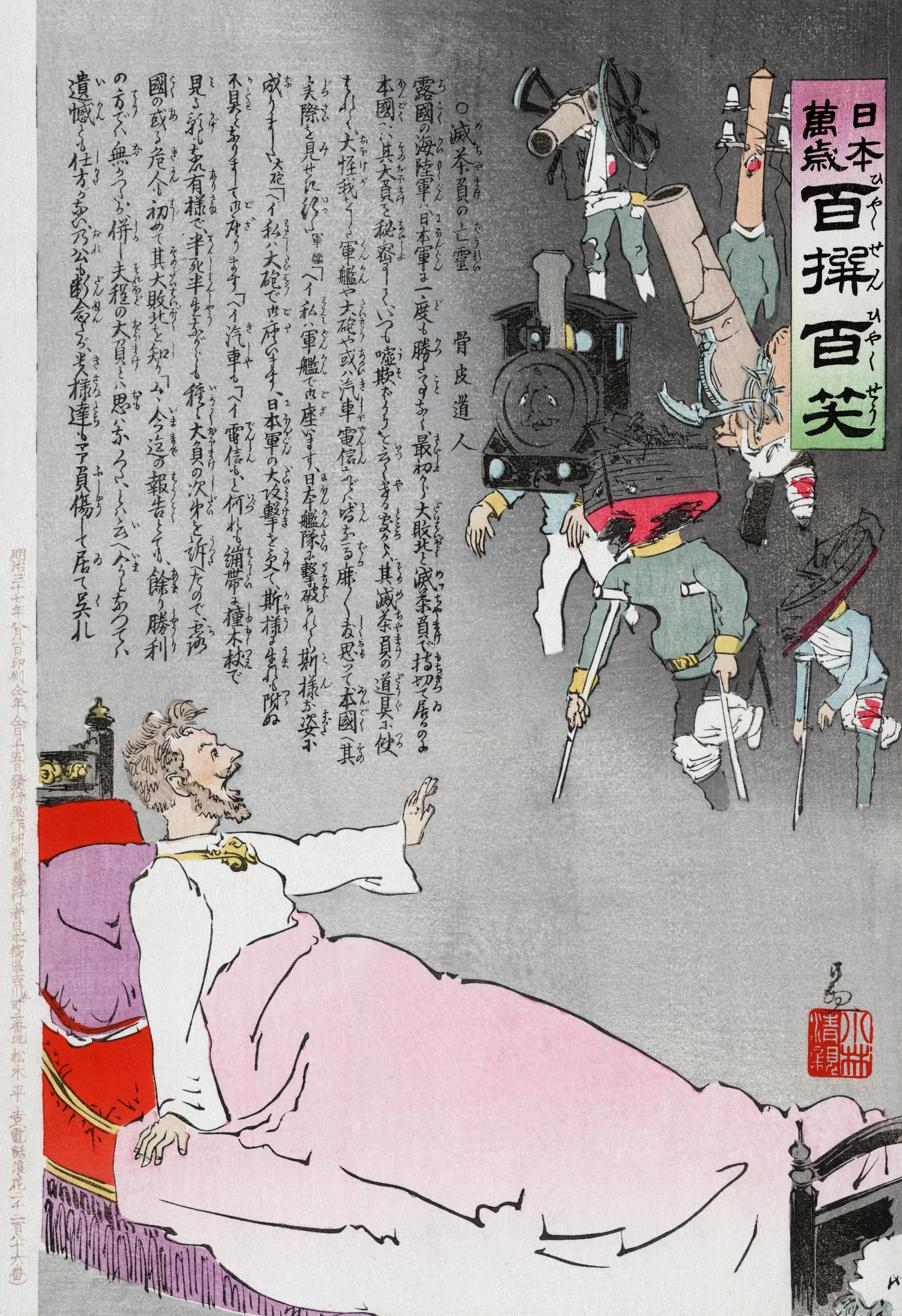
Japanese propaganda woodcut print showing Tsar Nicholas II waking from a nightmare of the battered and wounded Russian forces returning from battle. Artist Kobayashi Kiyochika, 1904 or 1905.

Sources do not agree on a precise number of deaths from the war because of a lack of body counts for confirmation. The number of Japanese Army dead in combat or died of wounds is put at around 59,000 with around 27,000 additional casualties from disease, and between 6,000 and 12,000 wounded. Estimates of Russian Army dead range from around 34,000 to around 53,000 men with a further 9,000–19,000 dying of disease and around 75,000 captured. The total number of dead for both sides is generally stated as around 130,000 to 170,000.

After the siege of Port Arthur in 1905, General Nogi Maresuke, who led the Japanese army during the siege, felt so guilty about the loss of many Japanese soldiers that he wanted to commit ritual suicide, but the Japanese Emperor Meiji refused to allow it; instead, Maresuke mentored the future Emperor Hirohito and built hospitals. After Emperor Meiji died in 1912, Maresuke and his wife committed suicide, 7 years after the siege of Port Arthur.

=== Political consequences ===
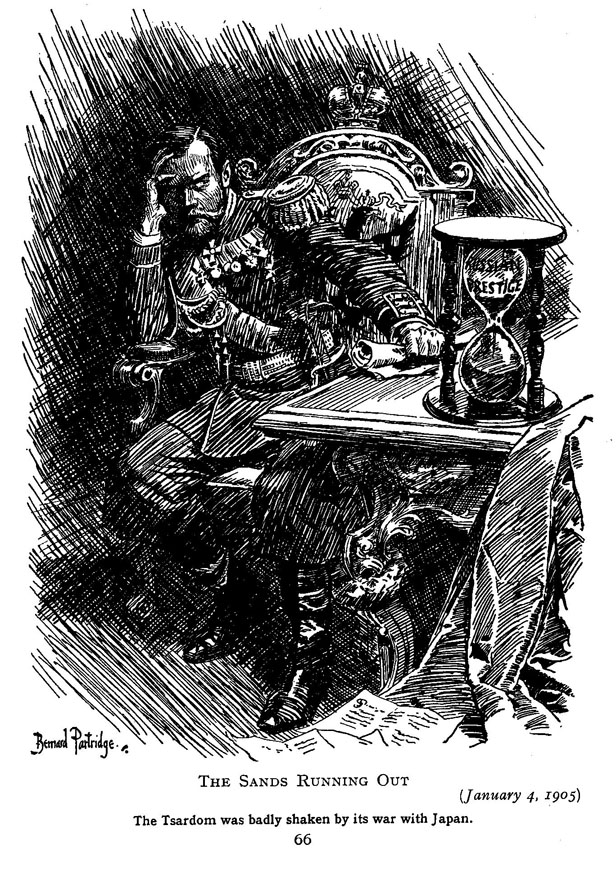
Punch cartoon, 1905; A cartoon in the British press of the times illustrating the Russian Empire's loss of prestige after the nation's defeat. The hour-glass represents Russia's prestige running out.

This was the first major military victory in the modern era of an Asian power over a European nation. Russia's defeat was met with shock in the West and across the Far East. Japan's prestige rose greatly as it came to be seen as a modern nation. Concurrently, Russia lost virtually its entire Pacific and Baltic fleets, and also much international esteem. This was particularly true in the eyes of Germany and Austria-Hungary before World War I. Russia was France's and Serbia's ally; its loss of prestige emboldened Germany in planning for war with France and supporting Austria-Hungary's war with Serbia.

==== Effects on Russia ====
The defeat of 1905 led in the short term to Russian military reforms that allowed it to face Germany in World War I.

Though there had been popular support for the war among the Russian public following the Japanese attack at Port Arthur in 1904, that popular support soon turned to discontent after suffering multiple defeats at the hands of the Japanese forces. For many Russians, the immediate shock of unexpected humiliation at the hands of Japan caused the conflict to be viewed as a metaphor for the shortcomings of the Romanov autocracy. This discontent added fuel to the simmering Russian Revolution of 1905, an event Nicholas II had hoped to avoid by taking intransigent negotiating stances. To quell the uprising, Nicholas II issued the October Manifesto, which included only limited reforms such as the Duma and failed to address the societal problems of Russia at the time. Twelve years later, that discontent would boil over into the February Revolution of 1917.

In Poland, which Russia partitioned in the late 18th century, and where Russian rule already caused two major uprisings, the population was so restless that an army of 250,000–300,000 – larger than the one facing the Japanese – had to be stationed to put down the unrest. Russia had mobilized thousands of Polish reservists during the war with Japan, contributing to unrest. Contemporary reports found that some Poles preferred death over fighting the Japanese for Russia.

Some political leaders of the Polish insurrection movement (in particular, Józef Piłsudski and Roman Dmowski) sent emissaries to Japan to collaborate on sabotage and intelligence gathering within the Russian Empire and even plan a Japanese-aided uprising, but Japan never took these Polish requests seriously.

==== Effects on Japan ====
Japan had become the rising Asian power and had proven that its military could fight the major powers in Europe with success. Most Western powers were stunned that the Japanese not only prevailed but decisively defeated Russia. In the Russo–Japanese War, Japan had also portrayed a sense of readiness in taking a more active and leading role in Asian affairs, which in turn had led to widespread nationalism throughout the region.

Although the war had ended in a victory for Japan, Japanese public opinion was shocked by the very restrained peace terms which were negotiated at the war's end. Widespread discontent spread through the populace upon the announcement of the treaty terms, causing the Hibiya incendiary incident. Riots erupted in major cities in Japan following the incident, including demonstrations in front of the US Legation in Tokyo. Two specific requirements, expected after such a costly victory, were especially lacking: territorial gains and monetary reparations to Japan. The peace accord led to feelings of distrust, as the Japanese had intended to retain all of Sakhalin Island but were forced to settle for half of it after being pressured by the United States, with President Roosevelt opting to support Nicholas II's stance on not ceding territory or paying reparations. The Japanese had wanted reparations to help families recover from lost fathers and sons as well as heavy taxation by the government to finance the war. Without them, they were at a loss. The outcome of the Portsmouth peace negotiations, mediated by the U.S., was received by the general Japanese population with disbelief on 5 and 6 September when all the major newspapers reported the content of the signed treaty in lengthy editorials.

As a result, the wartime government, the First Katsura Cabinet, which remained in power for the longest period (1,681 days) in the history of Japanese democracy to date, declared martial law to suppress the riots on 6 September (one day after the signing in Portsmouth). Martial law was lifted on 29 November after more than 2,000 people were arrested, but the Cabinet resigned on 22 December after ratifying the treaty on 10 October, as if taking the responsibility for a lost war.

==== Effects on the United States ====
Roosevelt earned the Nobel Peace Prize for his effort. George E. Mowry concludes that Roosevelt handled the arbitration well, doing an "excellent job of balancing Russian and Japanese power in the Orient, where the supremacy of either constituted a threat to growing America". As Japan had won every major battle on land and sea and as the Japanese people, who had received news about victory after victory did not understand that the costs of the war had pushed their nation to the verge of bankruptcy, the Japanese public was enraged by the Treaty of Portsmouth as many Japanese had expected the war to end with Russia ceding the Russian Far East to Japan and for Russia to pay an indemnity.

The United States was widely blamed in Japan for the Treaty of Portsmouth with Roosevelt having allegedly "cheated" Japan out of its rightful claims at the peace conference. On 5 September 1905 the Hibiya incendiary incident – as the anti-American riots were euphemistically described – erupted in Tokyo and lasted for three days, forcing the government to declare martial law.

==== Effects on Montenegro ====
The Treaty of Portsmouth overlooked Montenegro's participation in the war against Japan, leaving the two countries still technically belligerents until 2006, when the Japanese prime minister dispatched the Vice-Minister of Foreign affairs (Akiko Yamanaka) with a personal letter from him for the Prime Minister of Montenegro formally ending the war.

== Assessment ==
=== Historical significance ===
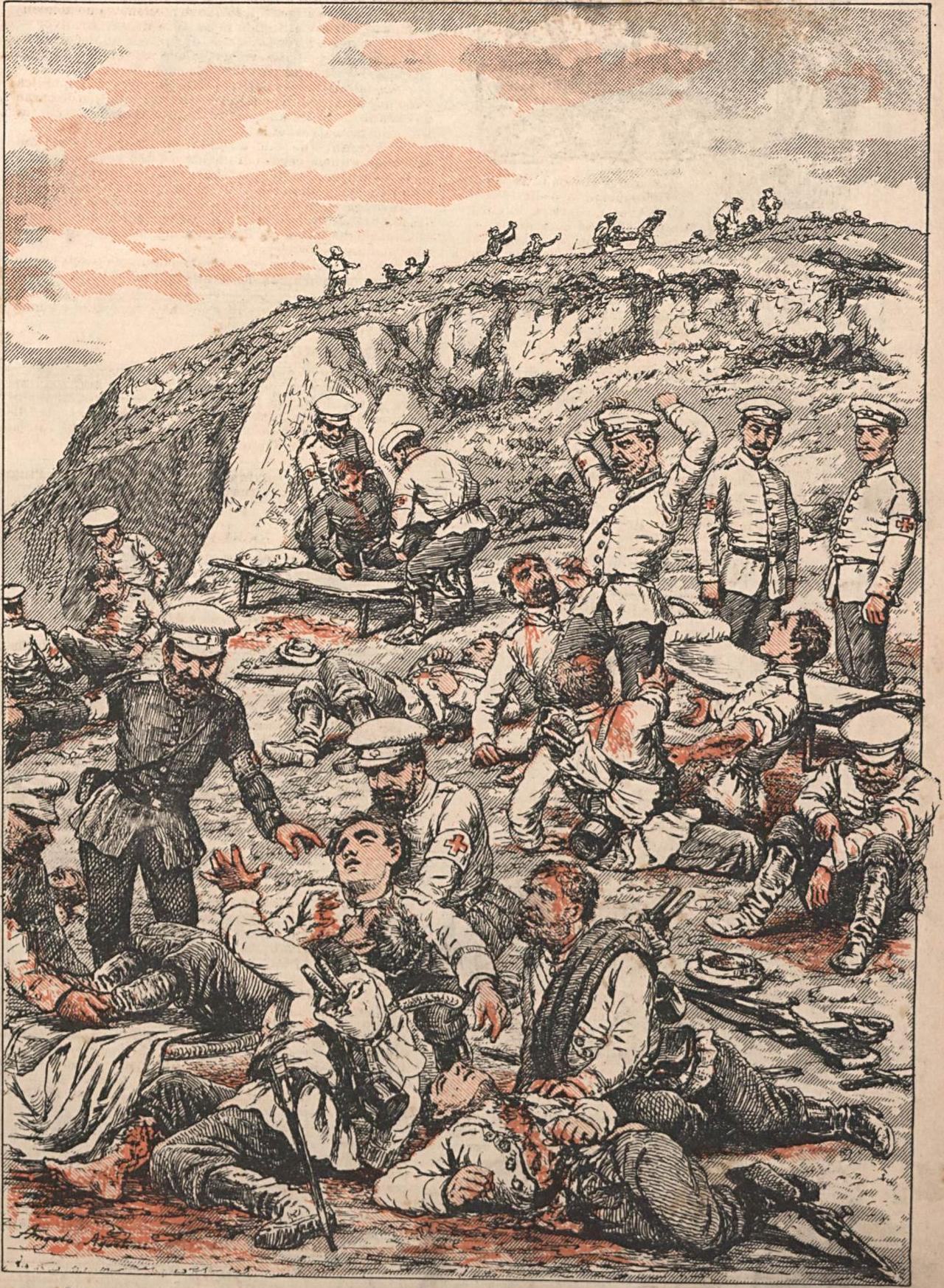
After the Battle of Liaoyang: Transport of wounded Russians by the Red Cross (Angelo Agostini)

The Russo–Japanese War introduced a number of characteristics that came to define 20th-century politics and warfare. Many of the innovations brought by the Industrial Revolution, such as rapid-firing artillery and machine guns, as well as more accurate rifles, were first tested on a mass scale. Military operations on both sea and land showed that modern warfare had undergone a considerable change since the Franco-Prussian War of 1870–71. Most army commanders had previously envisioned using these weapon systems to dominate the battlefield on an operational and tactical level but as events played out, the technological advances would forever alter the conditions of war as well.

For East Asia this was the first confrontation in thirty years involving two modern armed forces. The advanced weaponry led to massive casualties. Neither Japan nor Russia had prepared for the number of deaths that would occur in this new kind of warfare, and neither had the resources to compensate for such losses. This also left its impression on society at large, with the emergence of transnational and nongovernmental organizations, like the Red Cross, becoming prominent after the war. The consequent identification of common problems and challenges began the slow process that came to dominate much of the 20th century.

It has also been argued that the conflict had characteristics of what was later to be described as "total war". These included the mass mobilization of troops into battle and the need for so extensive a supply of equipment, armaments, and supplies that both domestic support and foreign aid were required. It is also argued that domestic response in Russia to the inefficiencies of the tsarist government set in motion the eventual dissolution of the Romanov dynasty.

=== Reception around the world ===
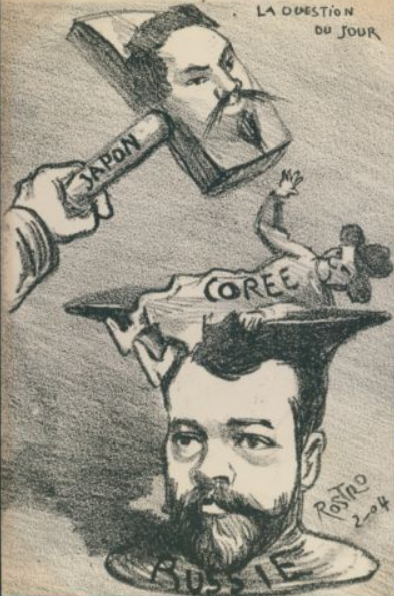
French postcard of political satire during the Russo–Japanese War

To the Western powers, Japan's victory demonstrated the emergence of a new Asian regional power. With the Russian defeat, some scholars have argued that the war had set in motion a change in the global world order with the emergence of Japan as not only a regional power but as the main Asian power. Rather more than the possibilities of diplomatic partnership were emerging, however. The US and Australian reaction to the changed balance of power brought by the war was mixed with fears of a Yellow Peril eventually shifting from China to Japan. American figures such as W. E. B. Du Bois and Lothrop Stoddard saw the victory as a challenge to western supremacy. This was reflected in Austria, where Baron Christian von Ehrenfels interpreted the challenge in racial as well as cultural terms, arguing that "the absolute necessity of a radical sexual reform for the continued existence of the western races of men has ... been raised from the level of discussion to the level of a scientifically proven fact". To stop the Japanese "Yellow Peril" would require drastic changes to society and sexuality in the West.

Certainly the Japanese success increased self-confidence among anti-colonial nationalists in colonised Asian countries – Vietnamese, Indonesians, Indians and Filipinos – and to those in declining countries like the Ottoman Empire and Persia in immediate danger of being absorbed by the Western powers. It also encouraged the Chinese who, despite having been at war with the Japanese only a decade before, still considered Westerners the greater threat. As Sun Yat-sen commented, "We regarded that Russian defeat by Japan as the defeat of the West by the East. We regarded the Japanese victory as our own victory". Even in far-off Tibet the war was a subject of conversation when Sven Hedin visited the Panchen Lama in February 1907. While for Jawaharlal Nehru, then only an aspiring politician in British India, "Japan's victory lessened the feeling of inferiority from which most of us suffered. A great European power had been defeated, thus Asia could still defeat Europe as it had done in the past." Within the Ottoman Empire, the Committee of Union and Progress embraced Japan as a role model.

Like many Asians, many African Americans welcomed the Japanese victory as a blow against global white supremacy. Whether left or right, moderate or radical, black politicians and activists saw Japan as a role model that showed that the white man should not underestimate non-white nations. Joseph Bryant, writing in The Colored American Magazine, claimed that the Japanese victory marked "the beginning of a new era" and predicted that Japan's rise would mean the death of "absolute Aryan domination of the world" and that in the next century Asians, not Europeans, would lead civilization.

In Europe, subject populations were similarly encouraged. James Joyce's novel Ulysses, set in Dublin in 1904, contains hopeful Irish allusions as to the outcome of the war. And in partitioned Poland the artist Józef Mehoffer chose 1905 to paint his "Europa Jubilans" (Europe rejoicing), which portrays an aproned maid taking her ease on a sofa against a background of Eastern artefacts. Painted following demonstrations against the war and Russian cultural suppression, and in the year of Russia's defeat, its subtly coded message looks forward to a time when the Tsarist masters will be defeated in Europe as they had been in Asia.

The significance of the war was also evident to Socialist thinkers:

The Russo-Japanese War now gives to all an awareness that even war and peace in Europe – its destiny – is not decided between the four walls of the European concert, but outside it, in the gigantic maelstrom of world and colonial politics. And it's in this that the real meaning of the current war resides for social-democracy, even if we set aside its immediate effect: the collapse of Russian absolutism. This war brings the gaze of the international proletariat back to the great political and economic connectedness of the world, and violently dissipates in our ranks the particularism, the pettiness of ideas that form in any period of political calm.

— Rosa Luxemburg, In the Storm, Le Socialiste, May 1–8, 1904 (translator: Mitch Abidor)

=== Military results ===
Russia had lost two of its three fleets. Only its Black Sea Fleet remained, the result of the 1878 Treaty of Berlin which had prevented the fleet from leaving the Black Sea through the Bosphorus, since Turkey and Britain would not waive the relevant clauses. The Berlin treaty superseded the London Straits Convention of 1841, which had been favourable to Russia.

Japan became the sixth-most powerful naval force by combined tonnage, while the Russian Navy declined to one barely stronger than that of Austria–Hungary. The actual costs of the war were large enough to affect the Russian economy and, despite grain exports, the nation developed an external balance of payments deficit. The cost of military re-equipment and re-expansion after 1905 pushed the economy further into deficit, although the size of the deficit was obscured.

The Japanese were on the offensive for most of the war and used massed infantry assaults against defensive positions, which would later become the standard of all European armies during World War I. The battles of the Russo–Japanese War, in which machine guns and artillery took a heavy toll on Russian and Japanese troops, were a precursor to the trench warfare of World War I. A German military advisor sent to Japan, Jakob Meckel, had a tremendous impact on the development of the Japanese military training, tactics, strategy, and organization. His reforms were credited with Japan's overwhelming victory over China in the First Sino-Japanese War of 1894–1895. However, his over-reliance on infantry in offensive campaigns also led to a large number of Japanese casualties.

The Empire of Japan's territorial expansion

Military and economic exhaustion affected both countries. Japanese historians regard this war as a turning point for Japan, and a key to understanding the reasons why Japan may have failed militarily and politically later. After the war, acrimony was felt at every level of Japanese society, and it became the consensus within Japan that their nation had been treated as the defeated power during the peace conference. As time went on, this feeling, coupled with the sense of "arrogance" at becoming a Great Power, grew and added to growing Japanese hostility towards the West, and fuelled Japan's military and imperial ambitions. Furthermore, Japan's substantiated interests in Korea and Liaodong led to the creation of a Kwantung Army, which became an autonomous and increasingly powerful regional force. Only five years after the war, Japan de jure annexed Korea as part of its colonial empire. Two decades after that, the Kwantung Army staged an incident that led to the invasion of Manchuria in the Mukden Incident; the Kwantung Army eventually came to be heavily involved in the state's politics and administration, leading to a series of localized conflicts with Chinese regional warlords that finally extended into the Second Sino-Japanese War in 1937. As a result, most Chinese historians consider the Russo–Japanese War as a key development in Japan's spiral into militarism in the 1920s–30s.

Following the victory of the Battle of Tsushima, Japan's erstwhile British ally presented a lock of Admiral Nelson's hair to the Imperial Japanese Navy, judging its performance then as on a par with Britain's victory at Trafalgar in 1805. It is still on display at Kyouiku Sankoukan, a public museum maintained by the Japan Self-Defence Force. Nevertheless, there was a consequent shift in British strategic thinking, resulting in enlargement of its naval docks at Auckland, New Zealand; Bombay, British India; Fremantle and Sydney, Australia; Simon's Town, Cape Colony; Singapore and British Hong Kong. The naval war confirmed the direction of the British Admiralty's thinking in tactical terms even as it undermined its strategic grasp of a changing world. Tactical orthodoxy, for example, assumed that a naval battle would imitate the conditions of stationary combat and that ships would engage in one long line sailing on parallel courses; but more flexible tactical thinking would now be required as a firing ship and its target manoeuvred independently.

== Military attachés and observers ==
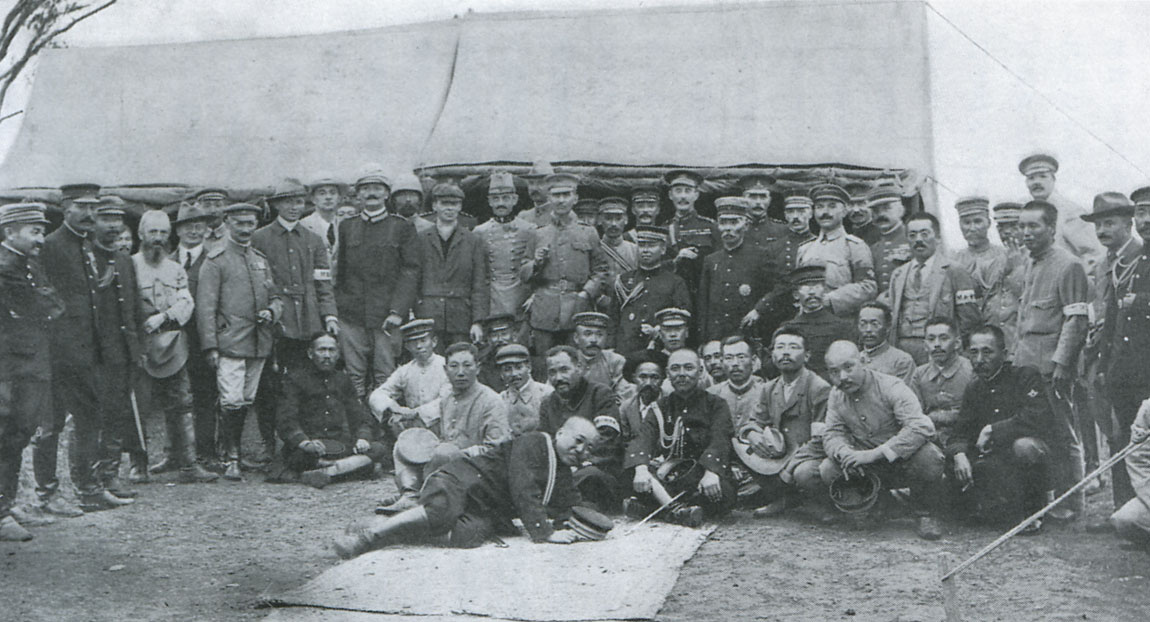
Japanese general, Kuroki, and his staff, including foreign officers and war correspondents after the Battle of Shaho (1904)

Military and civilian observers from every major power closely followed the course of the war. Most were able to report on events from the perspective of embedded positions within the land and naval forces of both Russia and Japan. These military attachés and other observers prepared first-hand accounts of the war and analytical papers. In-depth observer narratives of the war and more narrowly focused professional journal articles were written soon after the war; these post-war reports conclusively illustrated the battlefield destructiveness of this conflict. This was the first time the tactics of entrenched positions for infantry defended with machine guns and artillery became vitally important. Both would become dominant factors in World War I. Even though entrenched positions had already been a significant part of both the Franco-Prussian War and the American Civil War, it is now apparent that the high casualty counts, and the tactical lessons readily available to observer nations, were completely disregarded in preparations for war in Europe, and during much of the course of World War I.

In 1904–1905, Ian Standish Monteith Hamilton was the military attaché of the British Indian Army serving with the Imperial Japanese Army in Manchuria. As one of the several military attachés from Western countries, he was the first to arrive in Japan after the start of the war. He therefore would be recognized as the dean of multi-national attachés and observers in this conflict, although out-ranked by British field marshal, William Gustavus Nicholson, 1st Baron Nicholson, who was later to become chief of the Imperial General Staff.

== Economics ==
Despite its gold reserves of 106.3 million pounds, Russia's pre-war financial situation was not enviable. The country had large annual budget deficits, and was largely dependent on borrowed money.

Russia's war effort was funded primarily by France, in a series of loans totalling 800 million francs (£30.4 million); another loan in the amount of 600 million francs was agreed upon, but later cancelled. These loans were extended within a climate of mass bribing of the French press (made necessary by Russia's precarious economic and social situation and poor military performance). Although initially reluctant to participate in the war, the French government and major banks were co-operative since it became clear that Russian and French economic interests were tied. In addition to French money, Russia secured a loan in the amount of 500 million marks (£24.5 million) from Germany, who also financed Japan's war effort.

Japan's pre-war gold reserves were a modest £11.7 million; a major portion of the total cost of the war was covered by money borrowed from the United Kingdom, Canada, and the United States. During his canvassing expedition in London, the Japanese vice-governor of the Bank of Japan Takahashi Korekiyo met Jacob Schiff, an American banker and head of Kuhn, Loeb & Co. Schiff, in response to Russia's anti-Jewish pogroms and sympathetic to Japan's cause, extended a critical series of loans to the Empire of Japan, in the amount of 200 million US dollars (£41.2 million). He also raised loans from the Rothschild family in Britain. Japan's total war expenditure was 2,150 million yen, of which 38%, or 820 million yen, was raised overseas.

== List of battles ==
- 8–9 February 1904: Battle of Port Arthur: naval battle, inconclusive
- 9 February 1904: Battle of Chemulpo Bay: naval battle, Japanese victory
- 30 April – 1 May 1904: Battle of Yalu River, Japanese victory
- 25–26 May 1904: Battle of Nanshan: Japanese victory
- 14–15 June 1904: Battle of Te-li-Ssu: Japanese victory
- 17 July 1904: Battle of Motien Pass: Japanese victory
- 24 July 1904: Battle of Tashihchiao: Japanese victory
- 31 July 1904: Battle of Hsimucheng: Japanese victory
- 10 August 1904: Battle of the Yellow Sea,: naval battle, Japanese victory
- 14 August 1904: Battle off Ulsan: naval battle, Japanese victory
- 20 August 1904: Battle of Korsakov: naval battle, Japanese victory
- 19 August 1904 – 2 January 1905: Siege of Port Arthur, Japanese victory
- 25 August – 3 September 1904: Battle of Liaoyang: Japanese victory
- 5–17 October 1904 Battle of Shaho: Inconclusive
- 26–27 January 1905: Battle of Sandepu: Inconclusive
- 21 February – 10 March 1905: Battle of Mukden: Japanese victory
- 27–28 May 1905: Battle of Tsushima: naval battle, decisive Japanese victory
- 7–31 July 1905: Invasion of Sakhalin: Japanese victory

== Cultural legacy ==
=== Visual arts ===
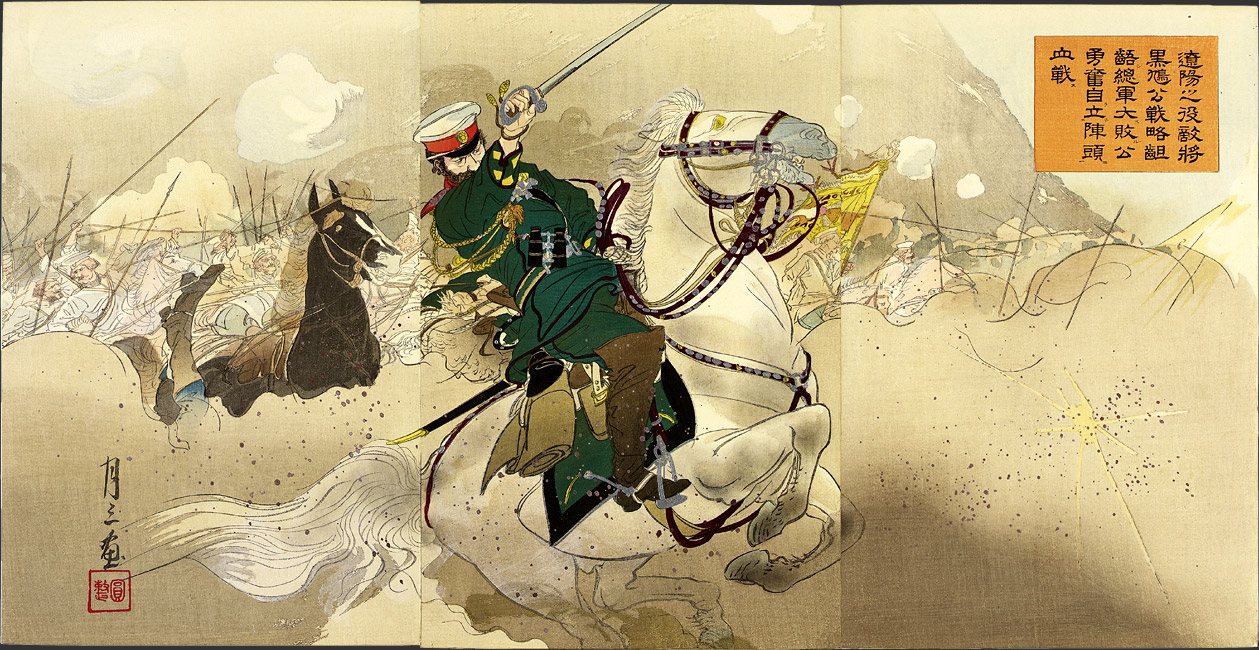
Ogata Gessan, The Battle of Liaoyang, woodblock print, 1904

The Russo–Japanese War was covered by dozens of foreign journalists who sent back sketches that were turned into lithographs and other reproducible forms. Propaganda images were circulated by both sides, often in the form of postcards and based on insulting racial stereotypes. These were produced not only by the combatants but by those from European countries who supported one or the other side or had a commercial or colonial stake in the area. War photographs were also popular, appearing in both the press and in book form.

In Russia, the war was covered by anonymous satirical graphic luboks for sale in markets, recording the war for the domestic audience. Around 300 were made before their creation was banned by the Russian government. Their Japanese equivalents were woodblock prints. These had been common during the Sino-Japanese war a decade earlier and celebrations of the new conflict tended to repeat the same imagery and situations. But by this time in Japan postcards had become the most common form of communication and they soon replaced prints as a medium for topographical imagery and war reportage. In some ways, however, they were still dependent on the print for their pictorial conventions, not least in issuing the cards in series that assembled into a composite scene or design, either as diptychs, triptychs or even more ambitious formats. However, captioning swiftly moved from the calligraphic side inscription to a printed title below, and not just in Japanese but in English and other European languages. There was a lively sense that these images served not only as mementoes but also as propaganda statements.

War artists were to be found on the Russian side and even figured among the casualties. Vasily Vereshchagin went down with the Petropavlovsk, Admiral Makarov's flagship, when it was sunk by mines. However, his last work, a picture of a council of war presided over by the admiral, was recovered almost undamaged. Another artist, Mykola Samokysh, first came to notice for his reports during the war and the paintings worked up from his diary sketch-books. Other depictions appeared after the event. The two by the Georgian naïve painter Niko Pirosmani from 1906 must have been dependent on newspaper reports since he was not present. Then, in 1914 at the outset of World War I, Yury Repin made an episode during the Battle of Yalu River the subject of a broad heroic canvas.

=== Music ===
On either side, there were lyrics lamenting the necessity of fighting in a foreign land, far from home. One of the earliest of several Russian songs still performed today was the waltz "Amur Waves" (Amurskie volny), which evokes the melancholy of standing watch on the motherland far east frontier.

Two others grew out of incidents during the war. "On the Hills of Manchuria" (Na sopkah Manchzhurii; 1906) is another waltz composed by Ilya Shatrov, a decorated military musician whose regiment suffered badly in the Battle of Mukden. Originally only the music was published, and the words by Stepan Petrov were added later.

The second song, "Variag", commemorates the Battle of Chemulpo Bay in which that cruiser and the gunboat Korietz steamed out to confront an encircling Japanese squadron rather than surrender. That act of heroism was first celebrated in a German song by Rudolf Greintz in 1907, which was quickly translated into Russian and sung to a martial accompaniment. These lyrics mourned the fallen lying in their graves and threatened revenge.

Nikolai Rimsky-Korsakov also reacted to the war by composing the satirical opera The Golden Cockerel, completed in 1907. Although it was ostensibly based on a verse fairy tale by Alexander Pushkin written in 1834, the authorities quickly realised its true target and immediately banned it from performance. The opera was premiered in 1909, after Rimsky-Korsakov's death, and even then with modifications required by the censors.

=== Poetry ===
Some Japanese poetry dealing with the war has remained popular more than a century later. General Nogi Maresuke's "Outside the Goldland Fortress" was learned by generations of schoolchildren and valued for its bleak stoicism. The army surgeon Mori Ōgai kept a verse diary which tackled such themes as racism, strategic mistakes, and the ambiguities of victory, which has gained appreciation with historical hindsight. In the present day there is also a growing appreciation of Yosano Akiko's parting poem to her brother as he left for the war, which includes the critical lines:

Never let them kill you, brother!
His Imperial Majesty would not come out to fight ...
How could He possibly make them believe
that it is honourable to die?

Even the Emperor Meiji himself entered the poetic lists, writing in answer to all the lamentations about death in a foreign land that the patriotic soul returns to the homeland.

European treatments were similarly varied. Jane H. Oakley attempted an epic treatment of the conflict in 86 cantos. The French poet Blaise Cendrars was later to represent himself as on a Russian train on its way to Manchuria at the time in his La prose du Transsibérien et de la Petite Jehanne de France (1913) and energetically evoked the results of the war along the way:

I saw the silent trains the black trains returning from the Far East and passing like phantoms ...
At Talga 100,000 wounded were dying for lack of care
I visited the hospitals of Krasnoyarsk
And at Khilok we encountered a long convoy of soldiers who had lost their minds
In the pesthouses I saw gaping gashes wounds bleeding full blast
And amputated limbs danced about or soared through the raucous air

Much later, the Scottish poet Douglas Dunn devoted an epistolary poem in verse to the naval war in The Donkey's Ears: Politovsky's Letters Home (2000). This follows the voyage of the Russian Imperial Navy flagship Kniaz to its sinking at the Battle of Tsushima.

=== Fiction ===
Fictional coverage of the war in English began even before it was over. An early example was Allen Upward's The International Spy. Set in both Russia and Japan, it ends with the Dogger Bank incident involving the Baltic Fleet. The political thinking displayed there is typical of the time. There is great admiration for the Japanese, who were British allies. Russia is in turmoil, but the main impetus towards war is not imperialism as such but commercial forces. "Every student of modern history has remarked the fact that all recent wars have been promoted by great combinations of capitalists. The causes which formerly led to war between nation and nation have ceased to operate" (p. 40). The true villain plotting in the background, however, is the German Emperor, seeking to destabilise the European balance of power in his country's favour. Towards the end of the novel, the narrator steals a German submarine and successfully foils a plot to involve the British in the war. The submarine motif reappeared in George Griffith's science fiction novel, The Stolen Submarine (1904), although in this case it is a French super-submarine which its developer sells to the Russians for use against the Japanese in another tale of international intrigue.

Though most English-language fiction of the period took the Japanese side, the Rev. W. W. Walker's Canadian novella, Alter Ego, is an exception. It features a Canadian volunteer in the Russian army who, on his return, agrees to talk about his experiences to an isolated upcountry community and relates his part in the Battle of Mukden. Though this incident only occupies two of the book's six chapters, it is used to illustrate the main message there, that war is "anti-Christian and barbarous, except in a defensive sense" (Ch. 3).

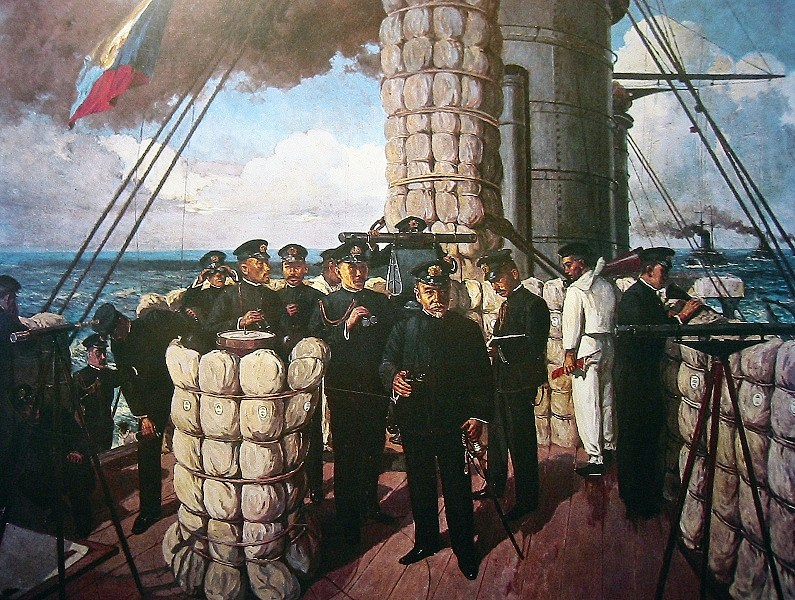
Painting of Admiral Heihachirō Tōgō on the bridge of the Japanese battleship Mikasa, before the Battle of Tsushima in 1905

Various aspects of the war were also common in contemporary children's fiction. Categorised as Boys' Own adventure stories, they offer few insights into the conflict, being generally based on news articles and sharing without any reflection in the contemporary culture of imperialism. Among these, Herbert Strang was responsible for two novels: Kobo told from the Japanese side, and Brown of Moukden viewed from the Russian side. Three more were written by the prolific American author, Edward Stratemeyer: Under the Mikado's Flag, At the Fall of Port Arthur, and Under Togo for Japan, or Three Young Americans on Land and Sea (1906). Two other English-language stories begin with the action at Port Arthur and follow the events thereafter: A Soldier of Japan: a tale of the Russo–Japanese War by Captain Frederick Sadleir Brereton, and The North Pacific by Willis Boyd Allen (1855–1938). Two more also involve young men fighting in the Japanese navy: Americans in For the Mikado by Kirk Munroe, and a temporarily disgraced English officer in Under the Ensign of the Rising Sun by Harry Collingwood, the pen-name of William Joseph Cosens Lancaster (1851–1922), whose speciality was naval fiction.

Another literary genre affected by the outcome of the war was invasion literature, either fuelled by racialist fears or generated by the international power struggle. Shunrō Oshikawa's novel The Submarine Battleship (Kaitei Gunkan) was published in 1900 before the actual fighting began but shared the imperial tensions that produced it. It is the story of an armoured ram-armed submarine involved in a Russo–Japanese conflict. Three other novels appeared in 1908 and are thought of as significant now because of their prophetic dimension. American author Arthur Wellesley Kipling (1885–1947) prefaced his The New Dominion – A Tale of Tomorrow's Wars with a note counselling future vigilance. The scenario there is an attack by German and Japanese allies which the US and British navies victoriously fend off. In Germany itself an air attack on the American fleet is described by Ferdinand Heinrich Grautoff (1871–1935), writing under the name Parabellum, in his novel Banzai!. Published in Berlin in 1908, it was translated into English the following year. An Australian author using the pseudonym Charles H. Kirmess first serialised his The Commonwealth Crisis and then revised it for book publication as The Australian Crisis in 1909. It is set in 1912 and told from the standpoint of 1922, following a military invasion of Australia's Northern Territory and colonisation by Japanese settlers.

Most Russian fictional accounts of the war had a documentary element. Alexey Novikov-Priboy served in the Baltic Fleet and wrote about the conflict on his return, but his early work was suppressed. It was not until the changed political climate under Soviet rule that he began writing his historical epic Tsushima, based on his own experiences on board the battleship Oryol as well as on testimonies of fellow sailors and government archives. The first part was published in 1932, the second in 1935, and the whole novel was later awarded the Stalin Prize. It describes the heroism of Russian sailors and certain officers whose defeat, in accordance with the new Soviet thinking, was due to the criminal negligence of the Imperial Naval command. A German novel by Frank Thiess, originally published as Tsushima in 1936 (and later translated as The Voyage of Forgotten Men), covered the same journey round the world to defeat.

Later there appeared a first-hand account of the siege of Port Arthur by Alexander Stepanov (1892–1965). He had been present there as the 12-year-old son of a battery commander and his novel, Port Arthur: a historical narrative (1944), is based on his own diaries and his father's notes. The work is considered one of the best historical novels of the Soviet period. A later novel in which the war appears is Valentin Pikul's The Three Ages of Okini-San (1981). Centred on the life of Vladimir Kokovtsov, who rose through the ranks to admiral of the Russian fleet, it covers the period from the Russo–Japanese War through to the February and October Revolutions. A much later Russian genre novel uses the period of the war as background. This is Boris Akunin's The Diamond Chariot (2003), in the first part of which the detective Erast Fandorin is charged with protecting the Trans-Siberian Railway from Japanese sabotage.

The main historical novel dealing with the war from the Japanese side is Shiba Ryōtarō's Clouds Above the Hill, published serially in several volumes between 1968 and 1972, and translated in English in 2013. The closely researched story spans the decade from the Sino-Japanese War to the Russo–Japanese War and went on to become the nation's favourite book.

== Filmography ==
- Port Arthur (1936)
- Kreiser Varyag (1946)
- Nichiro sensō shōri no hishi: Tekichū ōdan sanbyaku-ri (1957)
- Meiji tennô to nichiro daisenso (1958)
- Battle of the Japan Sea (1969, 佐藤 勝: 日本海大海戦, Nihonkai-Daikaisen) depicts the naval battles of the war, the attacks on the Port Arthur highlands, and the subterfuge and diplomacy of Japanese agents in Sweden. Admiral Togo is portrayed by Toshiro Mifune.
- The Battle of Tsushima (1975) documentary, depiction of the naval Battle of Tsushima
- The Battle of Port Arthur (1980, sometimes referred as 203 Kochi), depiction of the Siege of Port Arthur
- Battle Anthem (1983, 日本海大海戦・海ゆかば, Nihonkai-Daikasen: Umi Yukaba) Toshiro Mifune reprises his role as Admiral Togo from Battle of the Japan Sea (1969)
- Reilly, Ace of Spies (1983). Russian-born British spy Sidney Reilly's role in providing intelligence that allowed the Japanese surprise attack that started the Siege of Port Arthur is dramatised in the second episode of this TV series.
- Saka no Ue no Kumo, of which the third series dealt with the war period (December 2011)
- Golden Kamuy (2018), an anime adaptation of the manga of the same name. The story takes place just after the Russo–Japanese War, and features many flashbacks and references to it. Several of its principal characters are veteran Japanese army men who fought in the Siege of Port Arthur.
- The Prisoner of Sakura (2019, ソローキンの見た桜, Sorokin no mita saka, В плену у сакуры, V plenu u sakury), a joint Japan-Russia co-production, which was based on the true story of a prison camp in Matsuyama, Ehime Prefecture, during the war. The movie is centered around the romance between a Russian officer, a prisoner of war, and a Japanese nurse who find themselves on opposing sides of the war.

== See also ==
- Outline of the Russian Revolutions of 1905 and 1917 and Civil War
- Foreign policy of the Russian Empire
- Kaneko Kentarō
- List of warships sunk during the Russo–Japanese War
- Korea under Japanese rule
- Manchuria under Qing rule
- Baron Rosen
- Ōtsu incident
- Russian Imperialism in Asia and the Russo–Japanese War
- Western imperialism in Asia
- Japan-Russia relations

== Bibliography ==
- Chapman, John W. M. (2004). "Russia, Germany and the Anglo-Japanese Intelligence Collaboration, 1896–1906". In Erickson, Mark; Erickson, Ljubica (eds.). Russia War, Peace and Diplomacy. London: Weidenfeld & Nicolson. pp. 41–55. ISBN 0-297-84913-1.
- Connaughton, R. M. (1988). The War of the Rising Sun and the Tumbling Bear—A Military History of the Russo-Japanese War 1904–5. London: Routledge. ISBN 0-415-00906-5.
- Correspondence regarding the negotiations between Japan and Russia (1903–1904) Presented to the Imperial diet. March 1904. Washington? D.C., Gibson brothers? printers. 1904.
- Cox, Gary P. (January 2006). "The Russo-Japanese War in Global Perspective: World War Zero". The Journal of Military History. 70 (1): 250–251. doi:10.1353/jmh.2006.0037. S2CID 161979005.
- Duus, Peter (1998). The Abacus and the Sword: The Japanese Penetration of Korea. University of California Press. ISBN 978-0-520-92090-3.
- Esthus, Raymond A. (October 1981). "Nicholas II and the Russo-Japanese War". The Russian Review. 40 (4): 396–411. doi:10.2307/129919. JSTOR 129919. online Archived 27 July 2019 at the Wayback Machine
- Fiebi-von Hase, Ragnhild (2003). The uses of 'friendship': The 'personal regime' of Wilhelm II and Theodore Roosevelt, 1901–1909. In Mombauer & Deist 2003, pp. 143–75
- Forczyk, Robert [in German] (2009). Russian Battleship vs Japanese Battleship, Yellow Sea 1904–05. Osprey. ISBN 978-1-84603-330-8.
- Gordon, Andrew (20 July 2014). "Social Protest In Imperial Japan: The Hibiya Riot of 1905". Asia-Pacific Journal: Japan Focus. 12 (29–3).
- Hwang, Kyung Moon (2010). A History of Korea. London: Palgrave. ISBN 978-0230205468.
- Jukes, Geoffrey (2002). The Russo-Japanese War 1904–1905. Essential Histories. Wellingborough: Osprey Publishing. ISBN 978-1-84176-446-7. Archived from the original on 31 October 2020.
- Katō, Yōko (April 2007). "What Caused the Russo-Japanese War: Korea or Manchuria?". Social Science Japan Journal. 10 (1): 95–103. doi:10.1093/ssjj/jym033.
- Keegan, John (1999). The First World War. New York City: Alfred A. Knopf. ISBN 0-375-40052-4.
- Kowner, Rotem. Historical Dictionary of the Russo-Japanese War, also published as The A to Z of the Russo-Japanese War (2009) excerpt Archived 8 March 2021 at the Wayback Machine
- Mahan, Alfred T. (April 1906). "Reflections, Historic and Other, Suggested by the Battle of the Japan Sea". US Naval Institute Proceedings. 32 (2–118). Archived from the original on 16 January 2018.
- McLean, Roderick R. (2003). Dreams of a German Europe: Wilhelm II and the Treaty of Björkö of 1905. In Mombauer & Deist 2003, pp. 119–41
- Mombauer, Annika; Deist, Wilhelm, eds. (2003). The Kaiser – New Research on Wilhelm II's Role in Imperial Germany. Cambridge University Press. ISBN 978-052182408-8.
- Nish, Ian (1985). The Origins of the Russo-Japanese war. Longman. ISBN 9780582491144.
- Olender, Piotr (2010). Russo-Japanese Naval War 1904–1905: Battle of Tsushima. Vol. 2. Sandomierz, Poland: Stratus s.c. ISBN 978-83-61421-02-3.
- Paine, S. C. M. (2017). The Japanese Empire: Grand Strategy from the Meiji Restoration to the Pacific War. Cambridge University Press. ISBN 978-1-107-01195-3.
- Paine, S.C.M. (2003). The Sino-Japanese War of 1894–1895: Perceptions, Power, and Primacy. Cambridge University Press. ISBN 0-521-81714-5. Archived from the original on 29 October 2020.
- Röhl, John C.G. (2014). Wilhelm II: Into the Abyss of War and Exile, 1900–1941. Translated by Sheila de Bellaigue & Roy Bridge. Cambridge University Press. ISBN 978-052184431-4. Archived from the original on 1 October 2020.
- Schimmelpenninck van der Oye, David (2005). The Immediate Origins of the War. In Steinberg et al. 2005.
- Simpson, Richard (2001). Building The Mosquito Fleet, The US Navy's First Torpedo Boats. South Carolina: Arcadia Publishing. ISBN 0-7385-0508-0.
- Steinberg, John W.; et al., eds. (2005). The Russo-Japanese War in Global Perspective: World War Zero. History of Warfare/29. Vol. I. Leiden: Brill. ISBN 978-900414284-8.
- Steinberg, John W. (January 2008). "Was the Russo-Japanese War World War Zero?". The Russian Review. 67 (1): 1–7. doi:10.1111/j.1467-9434.2007.00470.x. ISSN 1467-9434. JSTOR 20620667.
- Sondhaus, Lawrence (2001). Naval Warfare, 1815–1914. Routledge. ISBN 978-0-415-21477-3.
- Storry, Richard (1979). Japan and the Decline of the West in Asia, 1894–1943. New York City: St. Martins' Press. ISBN 978-033306868-7.
- Strachan, Hew (2003). The First World War. Vol. 1 - To Arms. Oxford University Press. ISBN 978-019926191-8.
- Tikowara, Hesibo (1907). Before Port Arthur in a Destroyer; The Personal Diary of a Japanese Naval Officer. Translated by Robert Grant. London: J. Murray.
- Walder, David (1974). The Short Victorious War: The Russo-Japanese Conflict, 1904-5. New York: Harper & Row. ISBN 0060145161.
- Warner, Denis; Warner, Peggy (1974). The Tide at Sunrise, A History of the Russo-Japanese War 1904–1905. New York City: Charterhouse. ISBN 9780883270318.
- Watts, Anthony J. (1990). The Imperial Russian Navy. London, UK: Arms and Armour Press. ISBN 0-85368-912-1.
- Wells, David; Wilson, Sandra, eds. (1999). The Russo-Japanese War in Cultural Perspective, 1904-05. Macmillan. ISBN 0-333-63742-9.
- Willmott, H. P. (2009). The Last Century of Sea Power: From Port Arthur to Chanak, 1894–1922, Volume 1. Indiana University Press. ISBN 978-0-25300-356-0.
