= Amur Waves =

1909 waltz by Max Kyuss

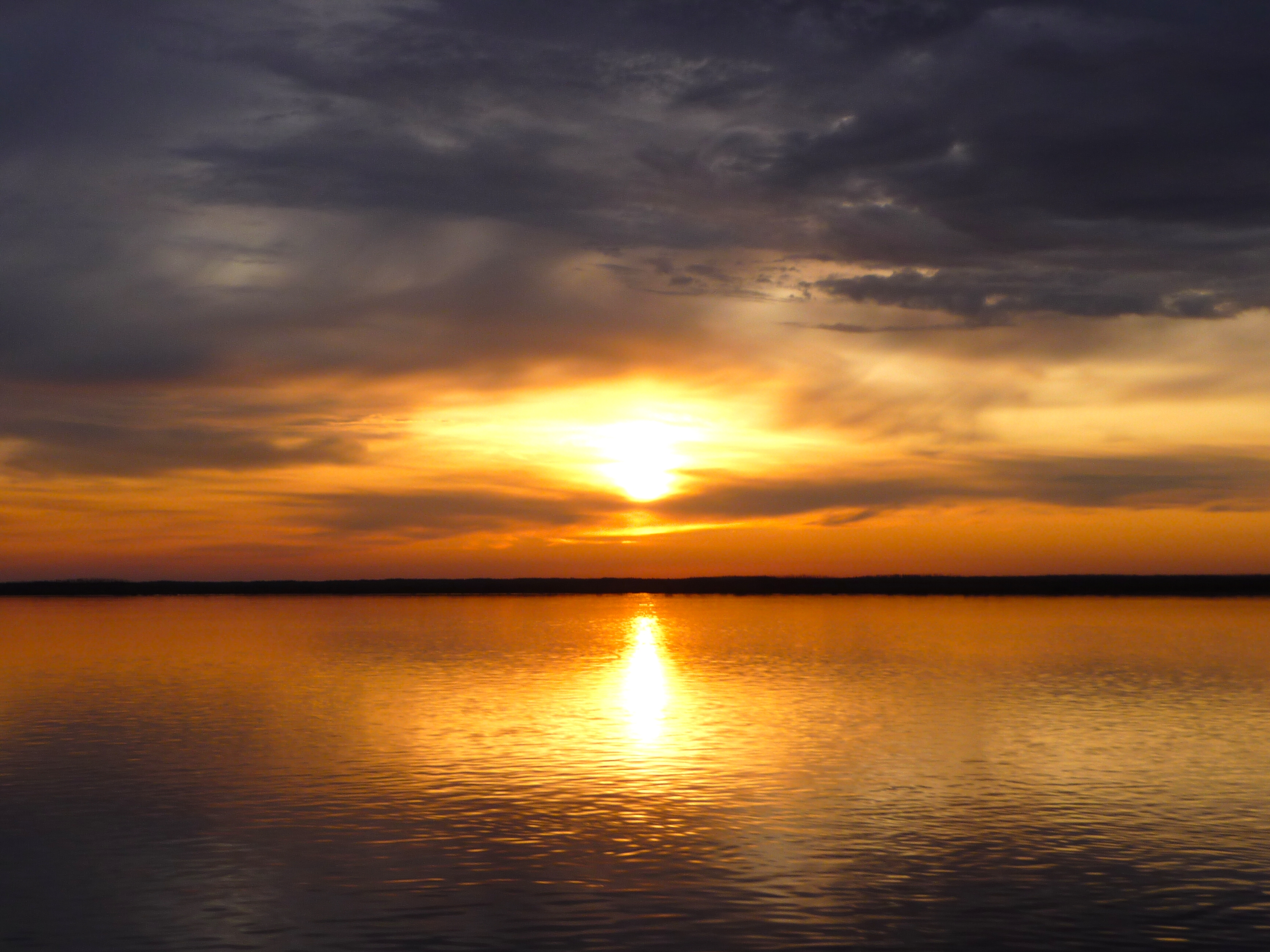

Amur Waves (Russian: Амурские волны) is a waltz (Opus 12) written in 1909 by composer and conductor Max Kyuss. It has orchestral, instrumental, choral and vocal and instrumental processing.

== History ==
Amur Waves was written by Max Kyuss in 1909, during his service as a conductor of the 11th East-Siberian regiment, stationed in Vladivostok since 1906. It is believed that the waltz is dedicated to a Far Eastern public activist Vera Yakovlevna Kirilenko, with whom, according to some sources, the composer was in love. According to some reports, the waltz was presented to them by Vera Yakovlevna, who at that time was a member of the board of the Vladivostok branch of the Society for Universal Help to War Rows and Their Families, and thus contributed as a charitable contribution.

Initially, the waltz was called Waves of the Amur Bay. Vladivostok is located on the shores of the Amur Bay. Then the bay fell out of the name, and the waltz became associated with Amur River.

During a short period of time, the waltz became popular not only in the Far East, but also in the center of Russia. Waltz was performed everywhere; the notes were reprinted many times and were actively bought up. On the cover of the music album, this was a portrait of Kirilenko.

In the 1920–1930s, the waltz began to be performed without specifying the name of the author, sometimes folk music was announced.

The second peak of waltz popularity came in the middle of the 20th century, when a text was written to it and it began to be performed with a choir. The initiator of the waltz arrangement for the choir was the head of the Song and Dance Ensemble of the Far Eastern Military District, Rumyantsev. The text was written by actor Serafim Popov. At the same time, the name of the author of waltz music was returned. Subsequently, the text was somewhat revised by Konstantin Vasilyev, a soloist of the ensemble of the Baltic Fleet.

In the following years, the waltz became so popular that, to a certain extent, it earned the right to be considered a musical symbol of Eastern Siberia and the Far East: its performance in the USSR opened musical programs for Siberia and the Far East.

This tradition has been preserved: the waltz melody is the call sign for some of the Far Eastern and East Siberian radio stations and television channels. In addition, the Far Eastern express Ocean from Khabarovsk to Vladivostok sets off for this music. In general, the ocean is sent to farewell slav.

There are vocal and instrumental waltz treatments.

It is performed primarily in China and Japan.
