= Yellow Russia =

Planned Imperial Russian expansion into China

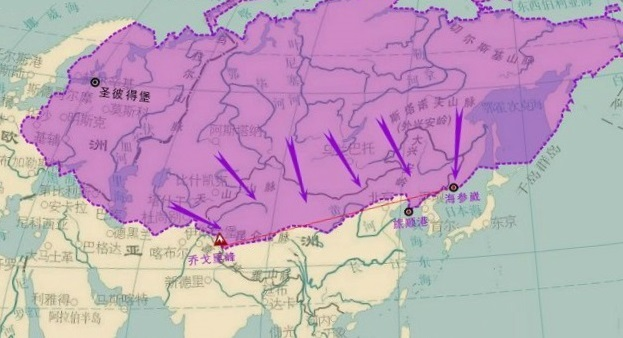
Map of the Russian Empire with the borders of Yellow Russia

Yellow Russia (Russian: Желтороссия, romanized: Zheltorossiya; Chinese: 黃俄羅斯計劃, abbr. 黃俄）was an Imperial Russian geopolitical concept and colonial project dating back to the late 19th to the early 20th centuries. Its intention was the taking of Chinese land, especially in Northeast China (Manchuria) and Xinjiang.

The term was first coined by Russian journalist Ilya Levitov in 1905 in his work "Yellow Russia as a Buffer Colony". It involved seizing northeastern lands from the weakened Qing China, resettling Cossacks and peasants to Manchuria, and converting the Chinese inhabitants to Orthodox Christianity.

== Origins ==
The name 'Yellow Russia' was first used by journalist Ilya Levitov, who wrote: “By Yellow Russia I mean the space in which the Russian element mixes with the Yellow race, especially the one that stretches from Lake Baikal to the Pacific Ocean. This space is, as it were, isolated from Russia and has something in common with it”.

However, the concept and ideas of Russian expansion into China (and wider East Asia) date further back. They emerged in part from Russian Slavophillic Ideology, as well as Russian Orientalist and Pan-Slavic intellectuals, writers/poets and nobility, and from an idea of a Russian messianic role to "civilise" the peoples of Asia. Russian author Fyodor Dostoevsky is quoted as saying:

"In Europe we were hangers-on and slaves, but in Asia we are masters. In Europe we were Tatars, but in Asia we too are Europeans. The mission, our civilising mission in Asia will give us spirit and draw us out there, if only we would get on with it!"

— Fyodor Dostoyevsky, A Writer's Diary, January 1881 Issue, Chapter II, Section 3, "Geok-Tepe. What Does Asia Mean to Us?"

== Attempts to secure influence in Northeast China ==
Russia gained a significant amount of presence in the Pacific with the Convention of Peking in 1860, gaining all of Outer Manchuria, and in 1860 founded the port of Vladivostok, which would become Russia's main power base in the Pacific. However, the city's port was icebound for three months a year, and even when the port was thawed had its access to the wider ocean restricted and controlled by Japan, who in the event of hostilities with Russia, would be able to isolate the port and cut off its access to the open sea. Thus, access to the wider Pacific Ocean could be affected by relations with Japan. The Japanese could control the La Pérouse Strait (near Hokkaido) north of Vladivostok, the Tsugaru Strait (between Hokkaido and Honshu) in the east, and the Tsushima Strait (between Korea and Japan) in the south. Seeking to counteract this and improve its geographical position, Russia attempted to occupy the island of Tsushima in 1861, but was forced to withdraw later that year by the British Empire.

Nevertheless, Russia was slowly strengthening its position in the Far East. By 1897, the population of the far eastern part of Russia grew to approximately 5,758,800 people.

Following the Convention for the Lease of the Liaotung Peninsula, Russia received the Kwantung Region for its use, ruling it as Russian Dalian, built the Chinese Eastern Railway (CER) and the South Manchurian Railway, and received control of these railways. In 1901 the construction of a naval base at Port Arthur began on the Liaodong Peninsula. In 1900, after the suppression of the Boxer Rebellion, the whole of Manchuria was occupied by Russian troops.

Russian attempts to increase influence and gain economic power in Manchuria were also encouraged greatly by the businessman Aleksandr Bezobrazov. In 1896, King Gojong of Korea was persuaded by Jules Briner, a Russian merchant, to grant a timber concession along the Yalu River. However, by 1898 it was clear to Briner that he couldn't organise the company and he sold it to Bezobrazov. Bezobrazov convinced many in the Royal circle, such as Illarion Vorontsov-Dashkov and Prince Felix Yusupov to take stock in the company, and eventually Bezobrazov and Grand Duke Alexander Mikhailovich of Russia presented it to the Tsar. Bezobrazov reportedly made a strongly favourable impression on Nicholas II, and Bezobrazov and Counts Vorontsov-Dashkov convinced him (and through the Tsar, the Dowager Empress) to invest in the Yalu timber enterprise and established an East Asian Development Company along with other timber concessions in the region, with Bezobrazov's circle also containing his cousin Alexey Abaza and Yevgeny Alekseyev. The enterprise was established as a private company in 1901. The Bezobrazov group played an instrumental role in the adoption of the 'new course' policy towards Manchuria and Korea, advocating the building up of the Russian military presence in Manchuria, opposing foreign influence and investment in Manchuria, and strengthening of Russian influence and economic interests in Korea. As part of this, Bezobrazov along with Alekseyev persuaded the Tsar to halt the withdrawal of Russian troops from Mukden in 1903 despite the advice of those such as General Kuropatkin, and in June 1903 the Yalu River Timber Company was established, with Bezobrazov as a state secretary facilitating communication between the company and the Russian government. The 'Bezobrazov Clique' helped drive the continual reinforcement and expansion of Russian interests in Manchuria up until the outbreak of the Russo-Japanese War in February 1904.

== End of the project ==
Russia's expansionist goals in East Asia inevitably came into conflict with the interests of Japan, which claimed the same areas of China and wanted economic dominance in Korea, leading to war between Russia and Japan in February 1904, where Russia was defeated. As a result of the Russo-Japanese War, the Russian imperial project in China collapsed; Russia lost Port Arthur and Dalian, ceding to Japan the Liaodong Peninsula, South Manchurian Railway and Southern Sakhalin. Efforts of settling the Russian Far East continued after the war and the Amur Railway was constructed from 1907-1916 partly as an alternative to the CER, but the expansionist project into Chinese territory was effectively over.

In 1932, the Japanese authorities founded the puppet state of Manchukuo in Manchuria, which included Harbin. In 1935, the USSR sold the Chinese Eastern Railway to Manchukuo, regaining co-ownership of the railway in 1945 along with the Republic of China, before fully returning it to the PRC in December 1952.

== See also ==
- Russians in China
- Russian Harbin
- Albazinians
- Zheltuga Republic
- Sino-Russian border conflicts
- Green Ukraine
