= Aleksandr Bezobrazov =

Aleksandr Bezobrazov may refer to:

- Aleksandr Bezobrazov (businessman) (1855–1931), businessman and political adventurer from the Russian Empire
- Aleksandr Bezobrazov (engineer), army officer and aviator of the Imperial Russian Air Force

== See also ==
- Bezobrazov
