= Russian ship Retvizan =

The Imperial Russian Navy named at least five of its ships Retvizan. The name comes from the Swedish ship of the line Rättvisan (meaning "The Justice") which the Russians captured at the Battle of Vyborg Bay in 1790.

- Russian ship of the line Retvizan (1783) - Ex-Swedish 62-gun ship of the line, sold in 1813.
- Russian ship of the line Retvizan (1818) - 74-gun ship of the line, hulked in 1824 and broken up in 1833.
- Russian ship of the line Retvizan (1839) - 74-gun ship of the line, hulked in 1852.
- Russian ship of the line Retvizan (1855) - Steam-powered, 81-gun ship of the line, stricken in 1880.
- Russian battleship Retvizan - Sunk in 1904 during the Siege of Port Arthur; salvaged and put into service by the Japanese as Hizen. Sunk as a target in 1924.
