= Alexey Abaza =

Russian admiral (1853–1915)

Rear Admiral Aleksei Mikhailovich Abaza
- Алексей Михайлович Абаза
- Born: 30 April 1853; Russian Empire
- Died: April 1915 (aged 61–62) or 3 February 1917 (aged 63); Mezherechka, Podolsk Governorate, Russian Empire
- Military career
- Allegiance: Russian Empire
- Service: Imperial Russian Navy
- Service years: 1873–1915
- Rank: Rear admiral
- Commands: Priboy; Svetlana; Vityaz; Asia; Svetlana; Training detachment, Naval Cadet Corps; Guards Naval Crew
- Conflicts: Russo-Japanese War

Aleksei Mikhailovich Abaza (Russian: Алексе́й Миха́йлович Абаза́; 30 April 1853 – 1915 or 3 February 1917) was an Imperial Russian Navy officer who achieved the rank of rear admiral. As a Royal Dignitary of Russia, he was one of the leading committee members which governed foreign affairs with an emphasis on Far Eastern issues at the beginning of the 20th century. The policies that he and his fellow committee members pursued played a significant role in causing the outbreak of the Russo-Japanese War of 1904–1905.

== Biography ==
=== Ancestry ===
Abaza was descended from a Moldovan noble family. He was born on 30 April 1853, the son of Mikhail Ageevich Abaza (1825–1859) and Alexandra Alekseevna, nee Zolotareva. Two of his father's brothers were Erast Ageevich Abaza (1819–1855), a military officer and amateur musician noted for a Russian romance he wrote that set the words of Ivan Turgenev's poem Misty Morning (Russian: Утро туманное) to music and was killed in the Crimean War, and Alexander Ageevich Abaza (1821–1895), a statesman who served as the Russian Empire's State Comptroller from 1871 to 1874 and its Minister of Finance from 1880 to 1881. After Prince Kudashev killed Abaza's father in a duel near the village of Melnikovka in the Cherkassk District in Kiev Governorate in 1859, Abaza's mother married Count Lev Alekseyevich Bobrinsky (1831–1915) in 1866.

=== Naval career ===
After education at the Naval Cadet Corps, Abaza entered the Imperial Russian Navy on 1 May 1873 as a Junker in the Baltic Fleet, in which he made a training cruise in the Gulf of Finland aboard the armored frigate Sevastopol. From 1873 to 1874, he made a cruise in the Mediterranean Sea aboard the armored frigate Kniaz Pozharsky. Between 1874 and 1879 he made an around the world cruise on the steam corvette 'Bayan. During the cruise, he was promoted to midshipman on 5 December 1875 and to michman on 11 September 1876.

After completing the voyage aboard Bayan, Abaza became flag lieutenant to the commander of the Pacific Ocean Squadron in the Russian Far East, Admiral Avraamy Aslanbegov. While visiting Japan, the Japanese government awarded him the Order of the Rising Sun. He made cruises aboard the cruiser Asia, the armored cruiser Minin, the clipper Nayezdnik, and again aboard Kniaz Pozharsky. He was promoted to lieutenant on 1 January 1881, and in 1882 he was awarded the Order of Saint Stanislaus Third Class and served on the cruiser Afrika.

In 1883, Abaza made a cruise aboard the clipper Sobol, visiting the Tatar Strait and foreign ports. In 1885 he served aboard the armored cruiser Dmitrii Donskoi and the yacht Strelna.

Abaza traveled to Elbing in the German Empire in 1886 to organize the transfer of three torpedo boats there to the Black Sea Fleet. He then was assigned to accompany the managing director of the Ministry of the Navy, Vice Admiral Ivan Shestakov, on a trip to the ports of eastern Siberia. He returned from the Russian Far East on the Dobroflot steamer Moskva, having completed a round-the-world voyage. He then commanded the steamers Priboy and Svetlana.

In 1887, Abaza cruised in the Baltic Sea on the yacht Strelna, the torpedo boat No. 139, the cruiser Asia, and the armored cruiser General-Admiral. In 1888 he again served on Strelna.

In 1889, Abaza served as adjutant in the retinue of General admiral Grand Duke Alexei Alexandrovich, visiting the Black Sea Fleet and putting to sea on the steamship Eriklik and the battleship Ekaterina II. He was promoted to captain second rank in 1890. Between 1892 and 1894 he served consecutively as commanding officer of the steam corvette Vityaz and the cruiser Asia.

Abaza was promoted to captain first rank on 2 April 1895. He traveled to France to oversee the construction there of the protected cruiser Svetlana, then commanded her until 1899, when he was appointed commander of the Guards Naval Crew, a Life Guards formation of the Russian Imperial Guard. He was promoted to rear admiral on 1 April 1901.

== Political career ==
On 6 May 1902, Abaza was appointed to the retinue of Tsar Nicholas II. On 10 November 1902 he became the Assistant Chief of the Ministry of Merchant Shipping and Ports and served as commander of the training detachment of the Naval Cadet Corps. He became acting deputy head of the ministry on 20 January 1903.

On 10 October 1903, Abaza was appointed manager of the Special Committee for the Affairs of the Far East. In this position, he enjoyed the right of a personal report to Nicholas II. Along with his cousin, Aleksandr Mikhailovich Bezobrazov, who was a state secretary, he had a great influence on diplomatic work with Japan, actually pushing aside the Russian Ministry of Foreign Affairs. The so-called "Bezobrazov clique" — made up of Abaza, Bezobrazov, and Admiral Yevgeni Ivanovich Alekseyev — was convinced of Japan's weakness and negotiated with Japan as if Russia was in a position of strength; according to then-Finance Minister Sergei Witte, a note Abaza presented to Nicholas II in March 1903 actually decided the question of starting a war with Japan. The "Bezobrazov clique" in this way played a predominant role in triggering the outbreak of the Russo-Japanese War in February 1904.

With the war underway, Abaza traveled incognito to Western Europe in the autumn of 1904 to organize the purchase through third parties of seven South American cruisers — the armored cruisers Garibaldi, General San Martin, Pueyredon, General Belgrano from Argentina and the armored cruisers Esmeralda and O'Higgins and protected cruiser Chacabuco from Chile – so that Russia could use them in military operations against Japan. The mission ended in failure.

On 13 June 1905, Abaza was dismissed from the post of manager of the Special Committee for the Far East and the committee was abolished. Although this left him in the tsar's retinue and in the Guards Naval Crew, his political influence on state affairs came to an end.

Subsequently, after the Russo-Japanese War culminated in Russia's defeat, Abaza drew up another note justifying the behavior of the 'Bezobrazov clique" leading up to the war.

The Russian government official and politician Vladimir Gurko, a contemporary of Abaza, described him as follows:

Being a seaman by service, he accidentally fell in with the heads of Russian foreign policy, and boldly took upon himself the resolution of extremely complex and delicate international issues, without the slightest preparation for that, relying only on the possibility of direct relations with [Tsar Nicholas II at] Tsarskoye Selo ...

Abaza died either in 1915 or on 3 February 1917.

== Personal life ==
Abaza married Natalia Feodorovna, nee Vasilchikova, who died in France sometime after 1930. They had six children: Alexander, born 12 March 1887, who reached the rank of captain second rank in the Imperial Russian Navy and died in Bordeaux, France, in September 1943; Vladimir; Leo, born 18 June 1897; Elizaveta, who was born in 1892 and died in 1941 in Saratov in the Soviet Union; Elena, born 4 June 1894; and Andrey, who was born in 1903 and died in 1941 in a Sevvostlag forced labor camp in the Soviet Union.
