= Russian battleship Retvizan =

Russian battleship

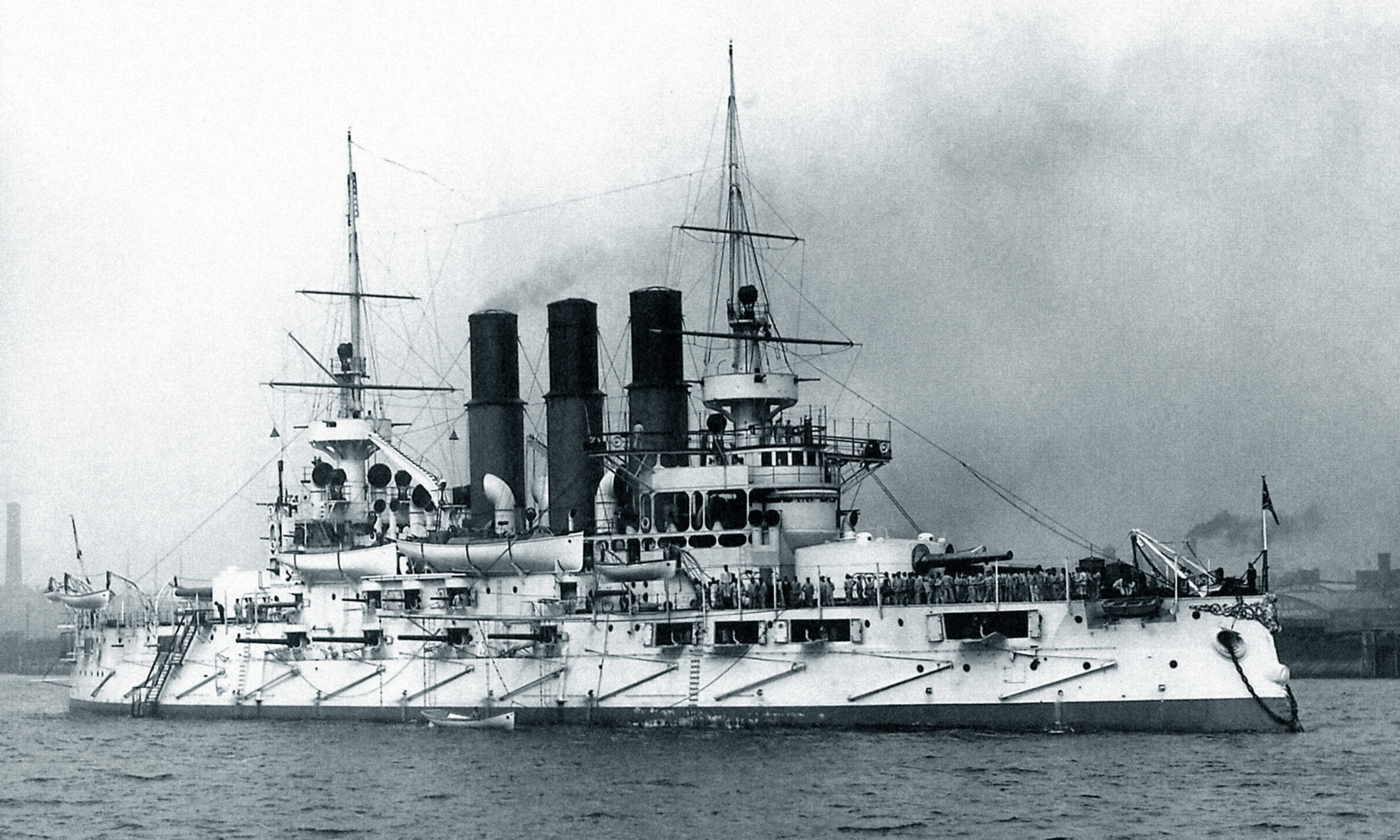
- Retvizan in the Delaware River, 1902

Class overview
- Name: Retvizan
- Operators: Imperial Russian Navy
- Preceded by: Potemkin
- Succeeded by: Tsesarevich
- Built: 1899–1902
- In commission: 1902–1922
- Completed: 1

History

Russian Empire
- Name: Retvizan
- Ordered: 2 May 1898 (Note: All dates used in this article are New Style)
- Builder: William Cramp & Sons, Philadelphia
- Cost: $4,360,000
- Yard number: 300
- Laid down: 29 July 1899
- Launched: 23 October 1900
- Commissioned: 23 March 1902
- Captured: 2 January 1905
- Fate: Sunk by Japanese howitzers in Port Arthur, China, 6 December 1904

Empire of Japan
- Name: Hizen
- Namesake: Hizen Province
- Acquired: 2 January 1905
- Out of service: April 1922
- Renamed: Hizen
- Reclassified: 1 September 1921 as a 1st-class coast defence ship
- Refit: 27 November 1905 – November 1908
- Stricken: 20 September 1923
- Fate: Sunk as gunnery target, 25 July 1924

General characteristics (as built)
- Type: Pre-dreadnought battleship
- Displacement: 12,780 long tons (12,985 t) (normal)
- Length: 386 ft 8 in (117.9 m)
- Beam: 72 ft 2 in (22 m)
- Draught: 25 ft (7.6 m)
- Installed power: 16,000 ihp (11,931 kW); 24 Niclausse boilers
- Propulsion: 2 shafts, 2 triple-expansion steam engines
- Speed: 18 knots (33 km/h; 21 mph)
- Range: 4,900 nmi (9,100 km; 5,600 mi) at 10 knots (19 km/h; 12 mph)
- Complement: 28 officers, 722 men
- Armament: 2 × twin 12 in (305 mm) guns; 12 × single 6 in (152 mm) guns; 20 × single 75 mm (3 in) guns; 24 × single 47 mm (1.9 in) guns; 6 × single 37 mm (1.5 in) guns; 6 × 15 in (381 mm) torpedo tubes; 45 mines
- Armour: Krupp armour; Belt: 9 in (229 mm); Deck: 2–3 in (51–76 mm); Barbettes: 4–8 in (102–203 mm); Turrets: 9 in (229 mm); Conning tower: 10 in (254 mm); Bulkheads: 7 in (178 mm)

Retvizan (Russian: Ретвизан) was a pre-dreadnought battleship built before the Russo-Japanese War of 1904–1905 for the Imperial Russian Navy. She was built by the American William Cramp & Sons because Russian shipyards were already at full capacity. Named after a Swedish ship of the line that was captured during the battle of Vyborg Bay in 1790 (Swedish: Rättvisan, meaning both fairness and justice), Retvizan was briefly assigned to the Baltic Fleet, but was transferred to the Far East in 1902.

The ship was torpedoed during the Japanese surprise attack on Port Arthur during the night of 8/9 February 1904 and grounded in the harbour entrance when she attempted to take refuge inside, as her draft had significantly deepened from the amount of water she had taken aboard after the torpedo hit. She was refloated and repaired in time to join the rest of the 1st Pacific Squadron when they attempted to reach Vladivostok through the Japanese blockade on 10 August. The Japanese battle fleet engaged them again in the Battle of the Yellow Sea, forcing most of the Russian ships to return to Port Arthur after their squadron commander was killed and his flagship damaged. Retvizan was sunk by Japanese howitzers in December after the Japanese gained control of the heights around the harbour.

The Japanese raised and repaired Retvizan after Port Arthur surrendered in January 1905. She was commissioned into the Imperial Japanese Navy as Hizen (肥前) in 1908. Based in Sasebo when Japan declared war on Germany in 1914, the ship was sent to reinforce the weak British squadron off British Columbia, but diverted to Hawaii after reports of a German gunboat there. Hizen was unsuccessfully sent to search for other German ships after the Americans interned the gunboat in November. After World War I she supported the Japanese intervention in the Russian Civil War and was disarmed in 1922 in accordance with the terms of the Washington Naval Treaty. The ship was sunk as a gunnery target in 1924.

== Background ==
Tsar Nicholas II had desired a warm-water port on the Pacific since his accession to the throne in 1894. He achieved this ambition in March 1898 when Russia signed a 25-year lease for Port Arthur and the Liaotung Peninsula with China. Japan had previously forced China to sign over the port and its surrounding territory as part of the treaty that concluded the First Sino-Japanese War of 1894–95, but the Triple Intervention of France, Russia, and Germany forced them to return the port in exchange for a sizeable increase in the indemnity paid by the Chinese. Japan invested much of the indemnity money in expanding its fleet, while Russia began a major building programme ("For the Needs of the Far East") to defend its newly acquired port.

Russian shipyards were already at maximum capacity so the Naval Ministry decided to order ships from abroad. Charles Henry Cramp, the owner and son of the founder of William Cramp & Sons in Philadelphia, had a relationship with the Imperial Russian Navy dating back to the late 1870s when his firm built the auxiliary cruisers Afrika, Asia, Europa and Zabiiaka. Cramp also repaired several Russian warships visiting America in 1893, and he cultivated the contacts he made in the Russian Navy throughout the 1890s. As such, he was ideally positioned to offer to build a battleship for the Russians in his shipyard when they began to look abroad.

== Design and description ==
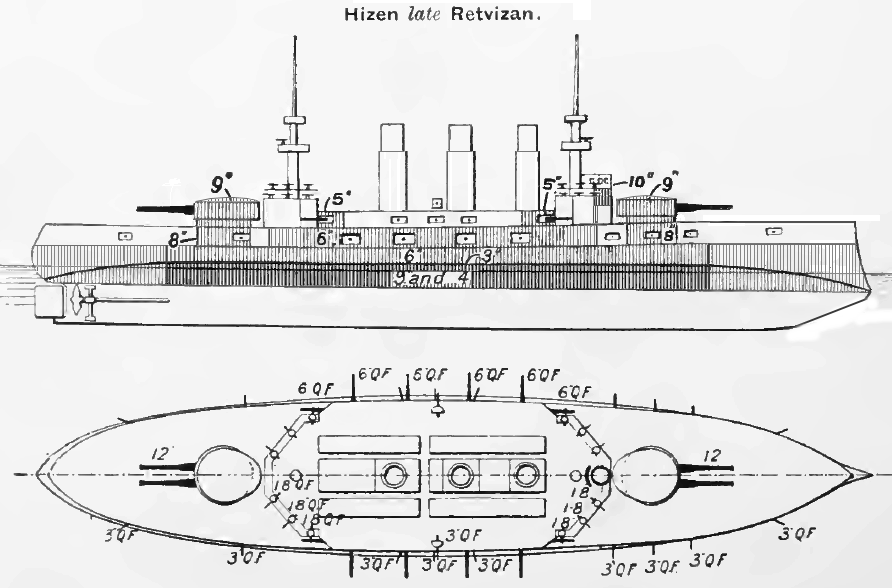
Plan and right elevation line drawing showing the armour (shaded areas) in the elevation view and the armament in the plan view

Preliminary design work on a battleship intended to equal the latest Japanese ships began in late 1897 and early 1898 by the Naval Technical Committee; the displacement was limited to 12,000 long tons (12,193 t) for economic reasons. The basic design was that of the Peresvet class with its speed increased to 18 knots (33 km/h; 21 mph) using only two shafts and its steaming range increased to 5,000 nautical miles (9,300 km; 5,800 mi) at 10 knots (19 km/h; 12 mph). The Naval Ministry intended to conduct an international design competition with the ships being built abroad as the Baltic shipyards were at full capacity.

Cramp's contacts kept him informed of the Russians' intentions and he sailed to Saint Petersburg to offer his services and design expertise in March 1898. Initially Cramp offered American designs to the Russians, including an updated version of USS Iowa as it was a relatively close match for the Russian specification, but the Russians preferred their own designs. Both sides compromised and the final design was based on the Potemkin. The new ship had four fewer 6-inch (152 mm) guns, but twice the coal capacity for improved range and a longer, slightly narrower hull for more speed. The contract was signed on 23 April 1898 for a price of $4,360,000. The protected cruiser Varyag was ordered at the same time for $2,138,000.

=== General characteristics ===
Retvizan was 382 feet 3 inches (116.5 m) long at the waterline and 386 feet 8 inches (117.9 m) long overall. She had a beam of 72 feet 2 inches (22 m) and a draught of 25 feet (7.6 m). The ship displaced 12,780 long tons (12,985 t) at normal load. Her hull was subdivided by fourteen transverse watertight bulkheads; in addition a longitudinal centreline bulkhead divided the engine room. Retvizan had a complete double bottom that extended up the side to the lower edge of the armoured deck. She had a metacentric height of 3 feet 2 inches (1.0 m). Her crew consisted of 23 officers and 722 enlisted men.

=== Propulsion ===
Retvizan had a pair of three-cylinder vertical triple-expansion steam engines with a total designed output of 16,000 indicated horsepower (11,931 kW). The Russian Navy preferred to use Belleville boilers, but Cramp pressed for Niclausse boilers, not least because he was the American agent for them and was supported by the General Admiral Grand Duke Alexei Alexandrovich. Twenty-four Niclausse-type boilers provided steam to the engines at a working pressure of 18 standard atmospheres (1,824 kPa; 265 psi). On sea trials, the engines produced 17,111 ihp (12,760 kW) and a top speed of 17.99 knots (33.3 km/h; 20.7 mph), just under the contract speed of 18 knots. Not surprisingly, Cramp claimed that she reached 18.01 knots to avoid contractual penalties. Following Retvizan's arrival in Russia, the propeller pitch was adjusted and she exceeded 18 knots. She carried a normal load of 1,016 long tons (1,032 t) of coal that gave her a range of 4,900 nautical miles (9,100 km; 5,600 mi) at 10 knots (19 km/h; 12 mph), and a maximum load of 2,000 long tons (2,032 t) that increased her range to 8,000 nautical miles (15,000 km; 9,200 mi) at the same speed.

=== Armament and fire control ===
Retvizan's armament was built by the Obukhov Works in Saint Petersburg and shipped to America for installation. The main armament consisted of two pairs of 12-inch 40-calibre guns mounted in French-style electrically operated centre-pivot twin turrets fore and aft. These guns had a maximum elevation of +15° and could depress to −5°. The ship carried 77 rounds per gun and the guns could fire one round every 80 to 90 seconds. They fired a 730-pound (330 kg) shell at a muzzle velocity of 2,592 ft/s (790 m/s) to a range of 12,000 yards (11,000 m).

Eight of the twelve 45-calibre 6-inch Canet Pattern 1892 quick-firing (QF) guns were mounted in casemates on the main deck while four were mounted on the upper deck. They fired shells that weighed 91.3 lb (41.4 kg) with a muzzle velocity of 2,610 ft/s (800 m/s). They had a maximum range of around 12,000 yards (11,000 m) and could fire three to five rounds per minute. The guns were provided with 200 rounds each.

The ship carried many smaller guns to defend itself against attack by torpedo boats. The largest of these were twenty QF 75-millimetre (3 in) Canet Pattern 1892 guns. Fourteen of these were in embrasures on the main deck and six were mounted on the upper deck, between the six-inch casemates. Each gun was provided with 325 rounds. They fired an 11-pound (4.9 kg) shell at a muzzle velocity of 2,700 ft/s (820 m/s) to a maximum range of 7,005 yards (6,405 m). The rate of fire was between twelve and fifteen rounds per minute. A total of twenty-four 47-millimetre (1.9 in) Hotchkiss guns were carried; four in each fighting top and eight at each end of the superstructure. They fired a 3.3-pound (1.5 kg) shell at a muzzle velocity of 2,100 ft/s (650 m/s). Six 37-millimetre (1.5 in) Hotchkiss guns were mounted in the bridge wings. They fired a 1.1-pound (0.50 kg) shell at a muzzle velocity of 1,540 ft/s (470 m/s).

Retvizan carried six 15-inch (381 mm) torpedo tubes. Four were above water, one each in the bow and stern and the aft pair of broadside tubes; the forward broadside tubes were underwater. A total of 17 torpedoes were carried. The ship was designed to carry two second-class torpedo boats each equipped with a single torpedo tube and a small quick-firing gun. The ship could also carry 45 mines.

The ship was fitted with Liuzhol stadiametric rangefinders that used the angle between two vertical points on an enemy ship, usually the waterline and the crow's nest, to estimate the range. The gunnery officer consulted his references to get the range and calculated the proper elevation and deflection required to hit the target. He transmitted his commands via a Geisler electro-mechanical fire-control transmission system to each gun or turret.

=== Armour ===
The total weight of the Krupp armour was 3,300 long tons (3,353 t) or 25.8% of the displacement. The armour was mostly made in the United States, although a contract was let for deck armour from Russia on 6 January 1899. The main waterline belt had a maximum thickness of 9 inches (229 mm) and tapered to 5 inches (127 mm) thick at its lower edge. It was 256 feet (78.0 m) long and 7 feet (2.1 m) high, of which about 3 feet (0.9 m) was above the waterline. The 6-inch upper belt was as long as the main belt and was 7 feet 6 inches (2.3 m) high. Armour plates 2 inches (51 mm) thick protected the ends of the ship to a height equal to that of the main and upper belts combined. Bulkheads 7 inches (177.8 mm) thick provided transverse protection for the ship's vitals. The lower casemate armour was 5 inches (127 mm) thick and armour screens 1.5 inches (38 mm) thick separated each gun. The upper casemate armour consisted of five inches of armour plate with semicircular 1.5-inch thick gun shields enclosing the guns.

The front and sides of the turrets were 9 inches (229 mm) thick with 2-inch roofs. Their barbettes were 8 inches (203 mm) thick above the upper deck, but diminished to 4 inches (102 mm) below it. The conning tower and its communication tube had 10-inch (254 mm) walls. The armour deck inside the central citadel was level with the top of the main belt and sloped down to meet the lower edge of the main belt. It was two inches thick on the flat and 2.5 inches (64 mm) on the slope. Fore and aft of the citadel the deck thickened to 3 inches (76 mm) to the ends of the ship and reinforced the ram bow.

== Construction and service ==
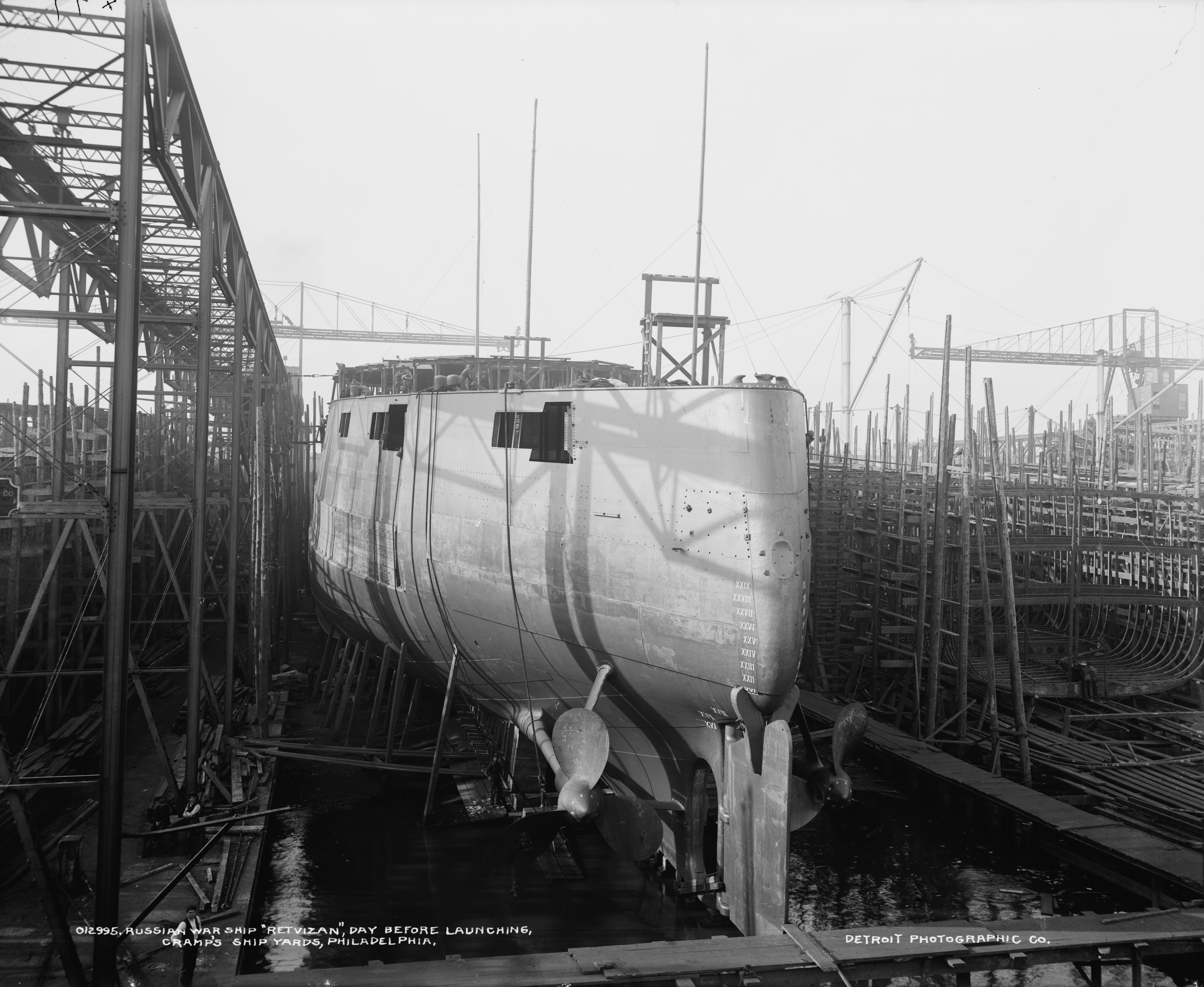
Retvizan under construction in Philadelphia, October 1900.

Named after the Swedish ship of the line Rättvisan (Justice) which was captured by the Russians at the Battle of Viborg Bay in 1790, Retvizan was ordered on 2 May 1898 for delivery in thirty months. The detailed sketch design was forwarded at the end of 1898 to Saint Petersburg for approval and work commenced on the ship around that time, although she was not officially laid down until 29 July 1899 as yard number 300. Construction was delayed by a strike at the shipyard that began in August 1899 and continued until the strike collapsed in early 1900. Other delays were caused by differences between American and Russian shipbuilding techniques and the insistence of the Naval Ministry on approving any design changes even though a Russian commission had been sent to Philadelphia to supervise her construction.

Her armament arrived in Philadelphia missing electrical cables and with incomplete documentation, which required Cramp's electricians to piece things together themselves, for which Cramp charged an extra $50,000. She was launched on 23 October 1900 and ran her acceptance trials in October 1901. The trials were successful but revealed incomplete work that Cramp had to finish before he received his last payment. More work needed to be done on the armament, but it had to wait until she arrived in Russia. Retvizan was accepted on 23 March 1902, under the command of Captain Eduard Schensnovich who commanded her throughout her Russian service.

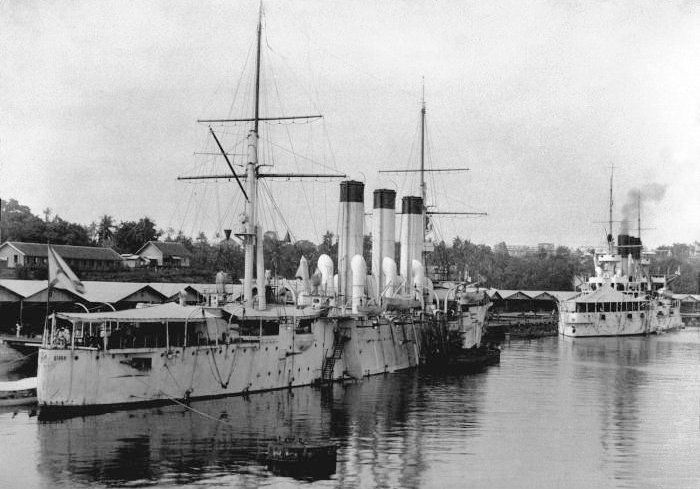
Diana and Retvizan in transit at Weh Island on their way to Port Arthur in 1903

Retvizan sailed for the Baltic Sea on 13 May 1902 and stopped to re-coal in Cherbourg, France, en route. After leaving Cherbourg a boiler tube burst on 14 June, scalding six stokers, three of them fatally. After her arrival she was fitted with radio equipment and took part in a naval review in Reval staged for the state visit of Kaiser Wilhelm II of Germany in August. Later that month she tested an experimental system for coaling at sea; it was deemed successful, but her equipment was removed before she sailed for the Pacific. Retvizan departed on 13 November 1902 in company with the battleship Pobeda and the cruisers Diana, Pallada and Bogatyr; she arrived at Port Arthur on 4 May 1903.

=== Battle of Port Arthur ===
The Pacific Squadron began mooring in the outer harbour at night as tensions with Japan increased, in order to react more quickly to any Japanese attempt to land troops in Korea. Both Russia and Japan had ambitions to control both Manchuria and Korea which naturally caused problems between them. A further issue was the Russian failure to withdraw its troops from Manchuria in October 1903. Japan had begun negotiations to reduce the tensions in 1901, but the Russian government was slow and uncertain in its replies because it had not yet decided exactly how to resolve the problems. Japan interpreted this as deliberate prevarications designed to buy time to complete the Russian armament programs. The final straws were news of Russian timber concessions in northern Korea and the Russian refusal to acknowledge Japanese interests in Manchuria while continuing to place conditions on Japanese activities in Korea. These caused the Japanese government to decide in December 1903 that war was now inevitable.

Retvizan was on searchlight duty on the night of 8/9 February 1904 and attracted many torpedoes during the Japanese surprise attack that night. She was hit on the port side forward by a torpedo which blew a 220-square-foot (20 m^{2}) hole in her side. Five men in the torpedo compartment were killed and all electrical power was knocked out. The ship took on enough water to give her a list of 11°; this was reduced to 5° by counter-flooding. A sail was used to cover the hole and steam was raised so she could head for the inner harbour. The 2,200 long tons (2,235 t) of water she had taken aboard had increased her draft enough to cause her to ground in the harbour entrance. She was not refloated until 8 March, but played an important role in the meantime in defeating a Japanese attempt to seal the entrance with block ships on 23–24 February. Repairs began immediately after she was towed into the harbour and were completed on 3 June although no docks were available and a cofferdam had to be built. She sailed with the rest of the Russian squadron on 23 June in an abortive attempt to reach Vladivostok. Rear Admiral Wilgelm Vitgeft returned to Port Arthur when he encountered the Japanese fleet, led by Admiral Tōgō Heihachirō, shortly before sunset as he did not wish to engage the numerically superior Japanese in a night battle.

During the summer, Retvizan landed two 6-inch, two 47 mm and six 37 mm guns to reinforce the landward defences of the port. She was hit on 9 August by seven 4.7-inch (120 mm) shells fired by a battery with a narrow view of the harbour. Schensnovich was slightly wounded, a barge adjacent to the ship was sunk and she was holed below the waterline. The ship took on a 1° list from 400 long tons (410 t) of water, which was corrected by counter-flooding. The holes were patched, although the water was not pumped out, and she sailed the next day with the fleet in another attempt to reach Vladivostok. This sortie resulted in the Battle of the Yellow Sea.

=== Battle of the Yellow Sea ===
The battle began as a long-range gunnery duel, during which the Russian ships hit the Japanese ships numerous times and forced Tōgō to temporarily disengage. Over two hours after the start of the battle, the Japanese fleet closed the range and started shooting again at 17:35. Forty minutes later a shell struck Retvizan's forward turret near the gun ports, killing one turret crewman and wounding six others from the blast pressure. The impact knocked one 12-inch shell off its loading tray, crushing two other sailors and also setting fire to the canvas covering the gun ports. Fearing that the fire might spread, the surviving crewmen flooded the turret, knocking out its electrical system. The crew was able to get the turret partially functional within an hour.

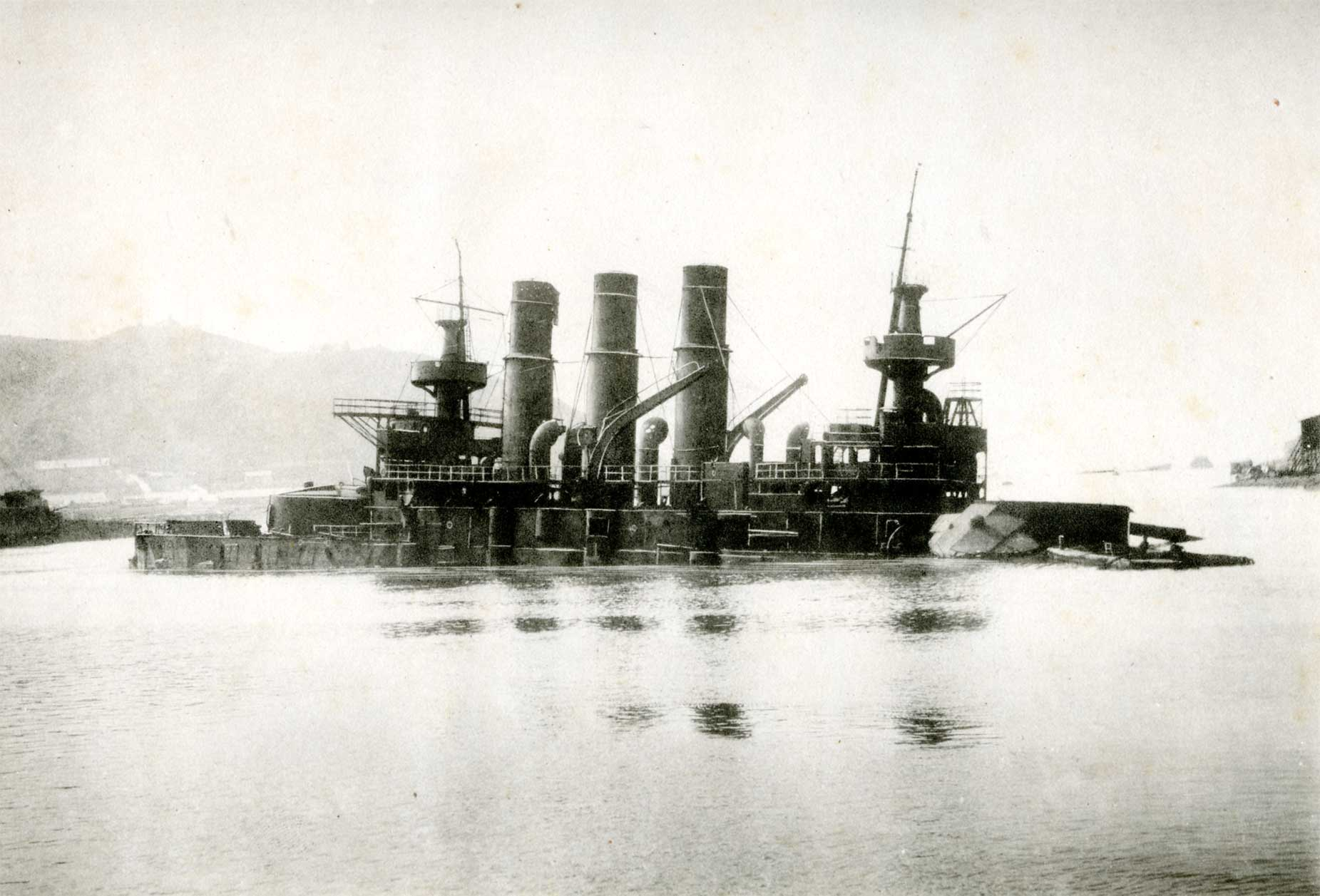
Retvizan sunk in Port Arthur

At approximately 18:40 hours on 10 August, during the final phase of the battle, the Russian flagship Tsesarevich was hit by 12-inch shells which killed Admiral Vitgeft and his immediate staff. The Russian battleship was turning out of control, disrupting the Russian formation. As the Japanese pre-dreadnoughts continued to pound the Tsesarevich with their 12-inch fire, Retvizan's captain boldly charged Tōgō's battleline in an attempt to divert the Japanese shellfire onto his ship. The Japanese battle line immediately shifted their fire onto the oncoming Retvizan, firing so many shells that they were unable to adjust their fire due to the number of shell splashes engulfing the Russian battleship. As the Russian squadron was now disorganized, Tōgō's battleships were running low on ammunition and some ships' main guns were disabled, he turned the battle over to his cruisers and destroyers. Retvizan had effectively ended the duel between the opposing fleets, and had saved Tsesarevich from destruction. During the battle, Retvizan received 18 hits from large-calibre shells, and suffered 6 sailors killed and another 42 men wounded, including Schensnovich.

She was subsequently besieged in Port Arthur and sunk in shallow water by thirteen 28-centimetre (11 in) howitzer shells on 6 December 1904 after the Imperial Japanese Army gained control of the heights surrounding the harbour. Schensnovich was the senior surviving naval officer and signed the capitulation of Port Arthur for the Imperial Russian Navy on 2 January 1905.

=== Japanese service ===
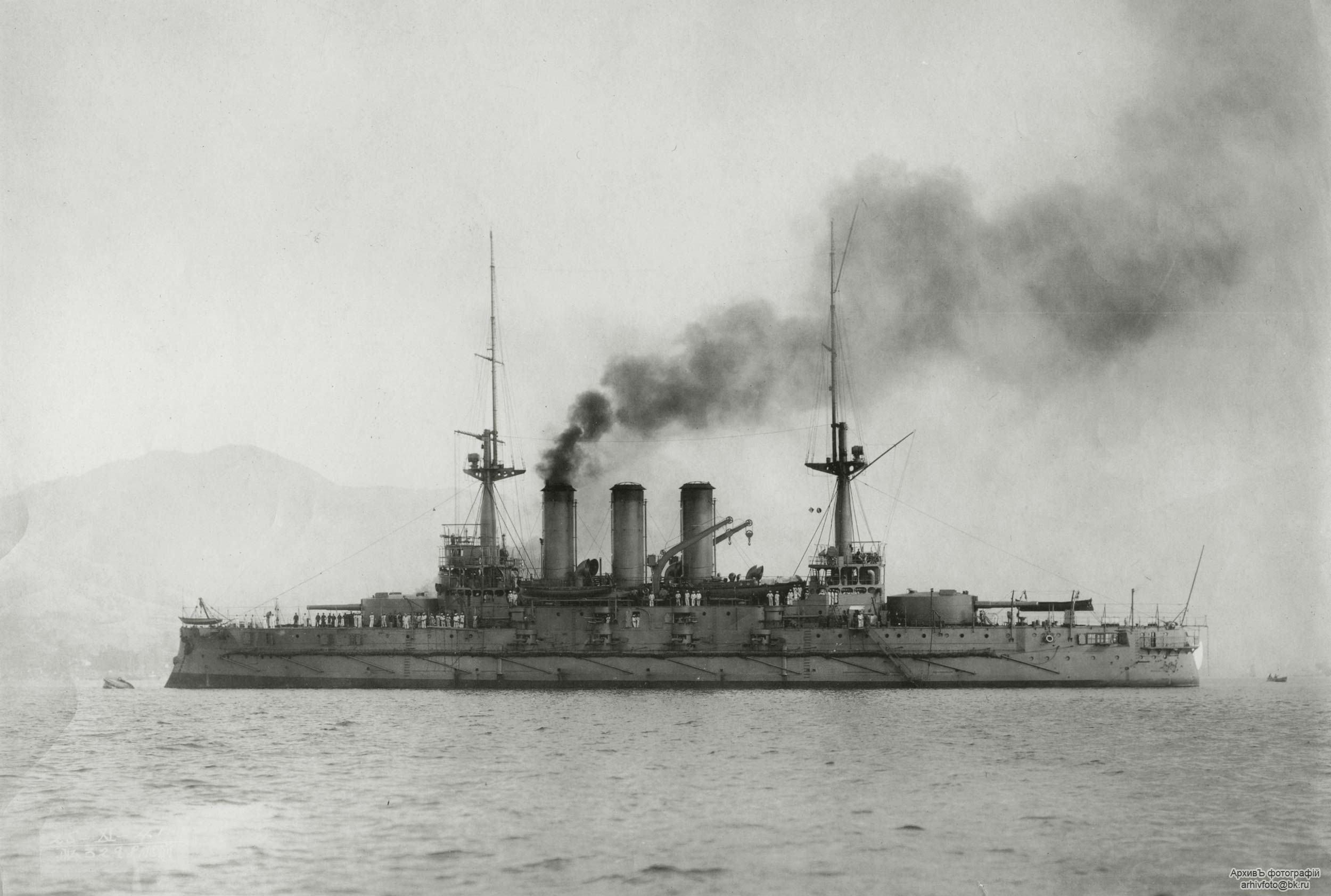
Japanese battleship Hizen

Retvizan was raised by the Japanese on 22 September 1905 and renamed Hizen, after Hizen Province, two days later. The ship departed Port Arthur on 19 November and arrived at Sasebo on 27 November where her repairs lasted until November 1908. Her fighting tops were removed, her light weapons were replaced by Japanese ones, and her boilers were replaced by Miyabara boilers. The barrels and breeches of her main guns were replaced by Japanese-built examples and all four above-water torpedo tubes were removed. In Japanese service her crew numbered 796 officers and crewmen.

Hizen was assigned to the 1st Fleet on 1 December 1909 and was refitted in 1913. After World War I broke out, she was dispatched to Esquimalt, British Columbia, in October 1914 to reinforce the weak British squadron there, then diverted to Honolulu, Hawaii, before the end of the month to watch the German gunboat SMS Geier after that ship arrived on 15 October. Hizen watched the port in company with the armoured cruiser Asama until Geier was interned on 8 November by the Americans. Afterwards she and Asama headed south in search of the German East Asia Squadron, but never located it; the ship was recalled home in February 1915. On 13 December 1915, Hizen was assigned to the 5th Division of the 3rd Fleet until relieved on 10 May 1917. The ship served in the Indian Ocean at some point during the war where she probably escorted troop convoys.

Hizen supported the Japanese intervention in the Russian Civil War in 1918 and was often stationed in Vladivostok as a guardship. On 1 September 1921 she was reclassified as a 1st class coast defence ship and disarmed at Sasebo in April 1922 in accordance with the Washington Naval Treaty. She was stricken from the official naval roll on 20 September 1923 and sunk as a target ship in the Bungo Channel on 25 July 1924.
