= Hans William von Fersen =

Baltic German admiral

Freiherr Hans William von Fersen
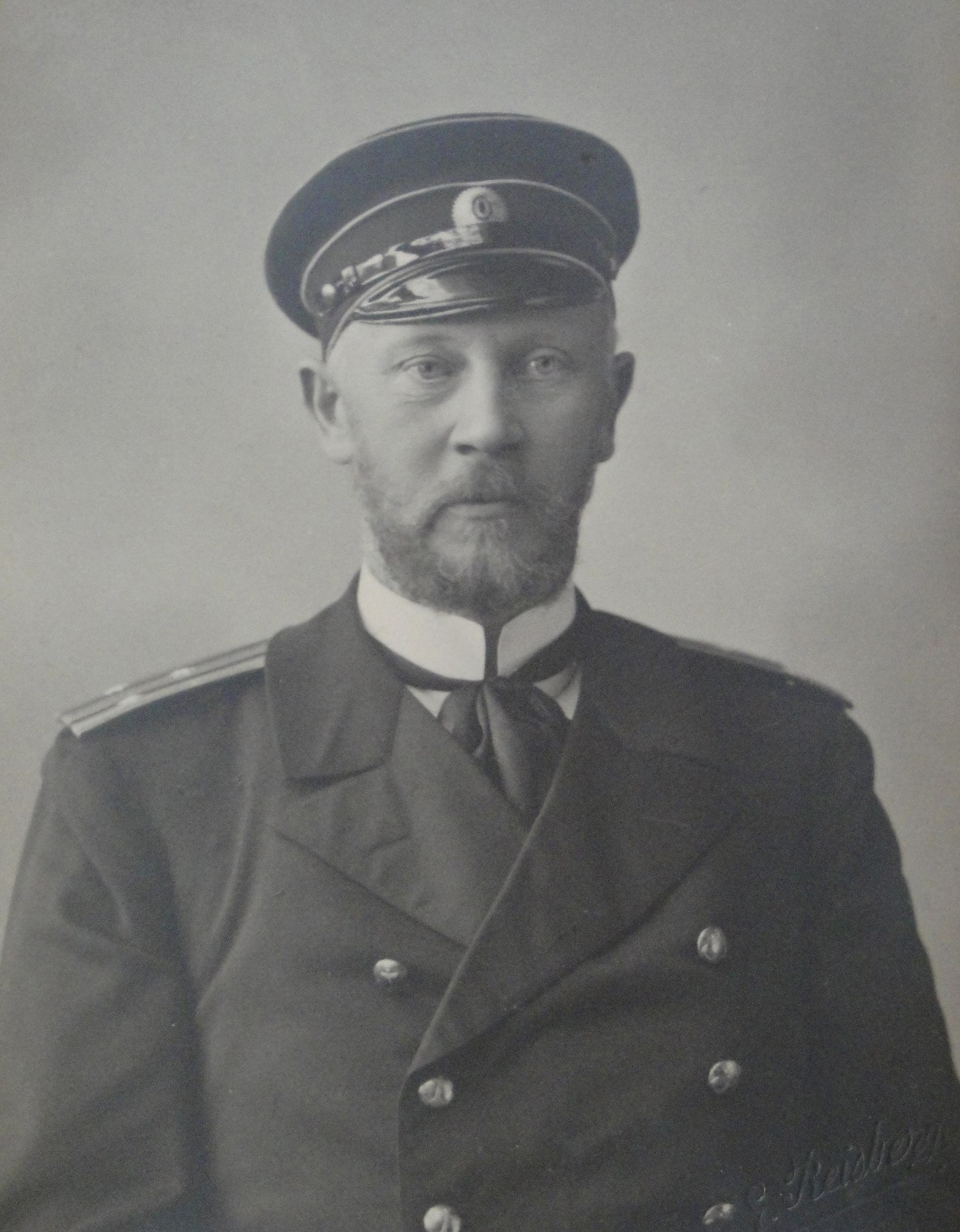
- Baron von Fersen
- Born: 14 May [O.S. 2 May] 1858; Kolk Manor, Kolk, Kreis Harrien, Governorate of Estonia, Russian Empire (in present-day Kolga, Kuusalu Parish, Harju County, Estonia)
- Died: 6 May 1937 (aged 78); Kose, Estonia
- Other name: Vasily Nikolaevich Fersen
- Military career
- Allegiance: Russian Empire
- Branch: Imperial Russian Navy
- Service years: 1876–1917
- Rank: Vice admiral
- Conflicts: Russo Japanese War; World War I

Hans William Freiherr von Fersen (Note: Russian: Василий Николаевич Ферзен, tr. Vasiliy Nikolaevich Ferzen) (14 May [O.S. 2 May] 1858 – 6 May 1937) was an admiral in the navy of the former Russian Empire.

== Biography ==
Fersen was born into a Baltic German family in what is now Estonia. From his mother's side, he has Scottish ancestry, as his maternal great-grandfather is Friedrich von Stuart.

Fersen graduated from the Sea Cadet Corps in 1875 and joined the Imperial Russian Navy in 1876. In 1878–80 he served aboard the cruiser Asia with the Russian Pacific Fleet, transferring to the cruiser Afrika from 1880 to 1883. On 10 July 1883 he was posted to Kronstadt. He was promoted to lieutenant on 1 January 1885 and served aboard the gunboat Bobr as officer of the watch later that year. He remained on the Bobr on its long-distance navigational training voyage to the Far East from 1886 to 1888.

From 1889 to 1890 Fersen attended the Russian navy mine warfare school and served in staff posts in the Russian Baltic Fleet from 1890 to 1896. In 1896 he commanded the destroyer Vzryv. In 1897–99 he was senior officer aboard the cruiser Afrika. On 28 April 1899 he was promoted to captain 2nd rank and served as naval attaché to the United States from September 1899 to 1902.

On 7 October 1902 Fersen was appointed to command the cruiser Izumrud in the Second Pacific Squadron based at Vladivostok. During the Russo-Japanese War of 1904–1905, he fought at the Battle of Tsushima. At the end of the battle, he refused to obey the order of Admiral Nikolai Nebogatov to surrender and broke through the Japanese blockade. The ship was however wrecked in Vladimir Bay in the Russian Primorsky Krai. Fersen received no punishment for his insubordination and was promoted to captain 1st rank in 1905.

In early 1906, Fersten was sent to suppress social unrest in Estonia during the unsettled times after the 1905 Russian Revolution. He returned to Vladivostok and served as commander of the Russian naval base there from 1906 to 1907. He returned to Petrograd and commanded the cruiser Aurora from March 1908 to January 1909. He was promoted to rear admiral in 1910 and commanded the 2nd Destroyer Division of the Baltic Fleet between 1909 and 1911 and the cruiser squadron of the Baltic Fleet from 1911 to 1913. On 14 April 1913 he was promoted to vice admiral and given command of the battleship squadron of the Baltic fleet. He served on the General Staff of the Russian navy during World War I and, following the February Revolution, retired from service on 13 April 1917.

After the Bolsheviks took power, Fersen decided to leave Russia, and subsequently settled in his country house in Kose, Estonia, where he died in 1937.

He had four children, including Wladislaw Nikolai (1892–1962) and Magnus Arvid von Fersen (1892–1938) who also served as officers in the Imperial Russian Navy.

== Awards ==
- Silver medal to the memory of the reign of Alexander III of Russia, 1896
- Order of St. Stanislaus 2nd degree, 6 December 1898
- Order of St. Anne 2nd degree, 14 April 1902
- Order of the Lion and the Sun (Persia), 1902
- Order of St Vladimir, 3rd degree, 1906
- Bronze medal commemorating the Russo-Japanese War of 1904–1905, 1906
- Order of St. Stanislaus 1st degree, 1912
- Bronze medal commemorating 300 years reign of the House of Romanov, 1913
- Order of St. Anne 1st degree, 1914
- Order of St Vladimir, 2nd degree, 1915
- Bronze medal commemorating the Battle of Gangut, 1915
