= Eduard Schensnovich =

Russian admiral (1852–1910)

Eduard Nikolaevich Schensnovich
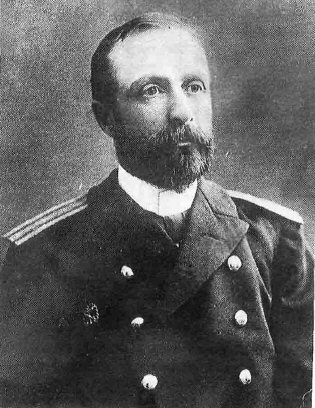
- Schensnovich before 1905
- Born: January 6, 1853; Arkhangelsk, Russian Empire
- Died: January 3, 1911 (aged 57); Saint Petersburg, Russian Empire
- Military career
- Allegiance: Russian Empire
- Branch: Imperial Russian Navy
- Service years: 1871–1910
- Rank: Vice Admiral
- Conflicts: Russo-Japanese War
- Awards: Order of St. George; Order of St. Vladimir; Order of Saint Stanislaus (Imperial House of Romanov); Order of St. Anna

Eduard Nikolayevich Schensnovich (Shchensnovich) (Russian: Эдуа́рд Никола́евич Щенсно́вич, romanized: Eduárd Nikoláevič Ščensnóvič; Polish: Edward Nikołajewicz Szczęsnowicz; January 6, 1852 – January 3, 1911) was an admiral in the Imperial Russian Navy.

== Biography ==
Schensnovich was born in Arkhangelsk into an ethnic Polish noble family in the Russian Empire. His father, Nikolai Schensnovich, was a career naval officer, who had been exiled to Arkhangelsk in 1833 for his role in the November Uprising. The family moved to Kronstadt in 1862. Schensnovich entered military service in 1867, and joined the Sea Cadet Corps in Petrograd, graduating as a midshipman in 1871. His first assignment was to the clipper ship Pearl in the Pacific Ocean in 1871, following which he joined the gunboat Smerch as a warrant officer. In 1876 he was posted to the Black Sea Fleet serving on board torpedo boats, and was promoted to lieutenant in 1877. During the Russo Turkish War of 1877 he served as a mine warfare specialist. In 1878 he joined the mine warfare school of the Russian Baltic Fleet and represented Russia during the Exposition Universelle (1878) in Paris, and went on to study the latest developments in mines in France and England later that year. From 1880 to 1885 he conducted numerous experiments with naval mines as part of the Russian Navy technical department, wrote numerous technical articles, and was decorated for his successes in the development of new weapons.

In 1885, Schensnovich was promoted to Captain 2nd Rank and commanded the destroyer division of the Russian Pacific Fleet. In 1886, he returned to the Baltic Fleet and commanded gunboats and destroyers, and was also involved in the drafting of tactics and battle plans for potential use against the Imperial German Navy in the event of a conflict. In 1895 he was base commander in Vladivostok.

In 1898, Schensnovich was promoted to Captain 1st Rank and was sent to Philadelphia to supervise the construction of the battleship Retvizan and cruiser Varyag in America. He returned to Russia in 1902 aboard the Retvizan which he commanded for the duration of her Russian Navy career. On September 21, 1902 Retvizan and Varyag were assigned to the Far East and arrived at Port Arthur April 20, 1903.

During the Russo-Japanese War of 1904–1905, Schensnovich was based at Port Arthur. The Retvizan was struck by Japanese torpedoes during one of the opening sorties of the Battle of Port Arthur. After emergency repairs, Schensnovich took part in the Battle of the Yellow Sea where, by attempting to ram the Japanese flagship, he proved to be a far more aggressive captain than many of his colleagues. During the battle, Retvizan took many hits, and Schensnovich was severely wounded in the abdomen by shrapnel. He never fully recovered from this injury. Captain Schensnovich signed the capitulation of Port Arthur for the Imperial Russian Navy on 2 January 1905.

After repatriation following the war, Schensnovich was based with the Baltic Fleet and promoted to rear admiral in 1905. By express order of Tsar Nicholas II, on March 19, 1906, he was made base commander at Libau and commander of the first Russian Navy submarine squadron, with responsibility for developing all aspects of submarine warfare. From 1908, he was promoted to vice admiral and made a member of the Admiralty Board, directing a committee to rewrite the rules and regulations for conduct of the Imperial Russian Navy, and issuing numerous memorandums on the shortcomings of the Russian shipbuilding industry and tactics during the Russo-Japanese War. His health continued to deteriorate, and he died in 1911.

== Honors ==
- Order of St. Stanislaus 3rd class, 1878
- Order of St. Anne 3rd class, 1880 or 1881
- Order of St. Stanislaus 2nd class, 1890
- Order of St. Anne 2nd class, 1894
- Order of St Vladimir, 4th class, 1897
- Order of Prince Danilo I, Montenegro, 1899
- Order of St Vladimir, 3rd class, 1902
- Order of the Red Eagle, 2nd class, Prussia, 1902
- Order of the Saviour, Commander's Cross, Greece, 1903
- Order of St. George, 4th class, 1904
- Commemorative medal of the Russo-Japanese War (1906)
- Order of St. Stanislaus 1st class, 1907
- Golden Sword of St George "for bravery", 1907
- Order of St. Anne 1st class, 1910
