= Aleksey Kuropatkin =

Russian Imperial Minister of War from 1898 to 1904

- Алексей Куропаткин
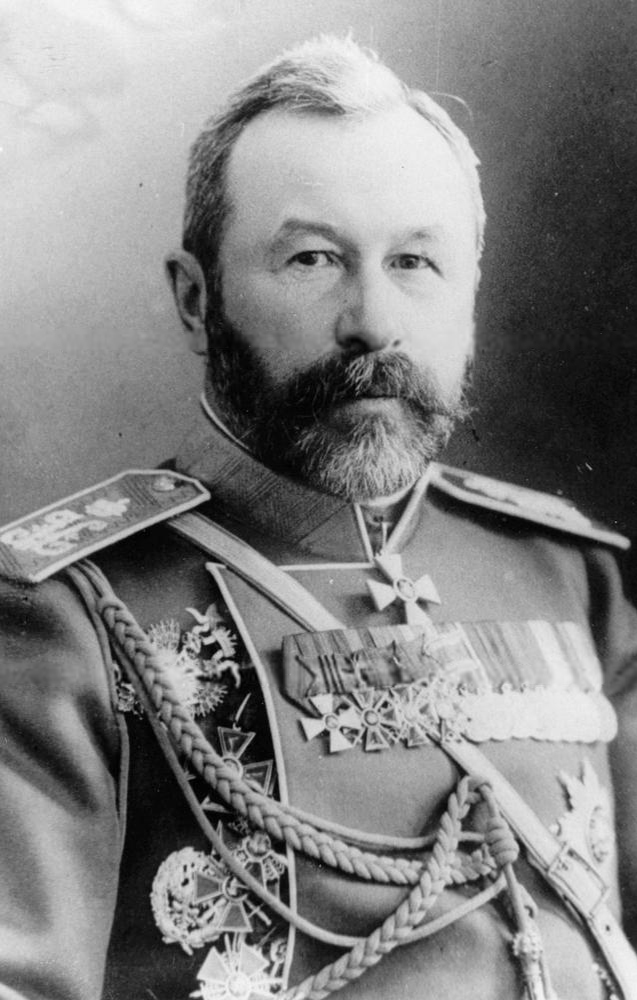

Minister of War
- In office 1 January 1898 – 7 February 1904
- Monarch: Nicholas II
- Preceded by: Pyotr Vannovsky
- Succeeded by: Viktor Sakharov

Personal details
- Born: March 29, 1848 Kholmsky Uyezd, Pskov Governorate, Russian Empire
- Died: January 16, 1925 (aged 76) Pskov Governorate, Russian SFSR, Soviet Union

Military service
- Allegiance: Russian Empire
- Branch/service: Russian Imperial Army
- Years of service: 1864–1907; 1915–1917
- Rank: General
- Commands: Fifth Army
- Battles/wars: Conquest of Central Asia; Conquest of Bukhara; Siege of Samarkand; Battle of Geok Tepe; Boxer Rebellion; Russo-Japanese War; Battle of Mukden; Battle of Liaoyang; World War I
- Awards: see awards

Aleksey Nikolayevich Kuropatkin (Russian: Алексе́й Никола́евич Куропа́ткин; March 29, 1848 – January 16, 1925) was a Russian politician and military officer who served as the Russian Imperial Minister of War from January 1898 to February 1904 and as a field commander subsequently. Historians often hold him responsible for major Russian defeats in the Russo-Japanese War of 1904 to 1905, most notably at the Battle of Mukden (1905) and at the Battle of Liaoyang (August–September 1904).

== Biography ==
=== Early years ===
Kuropatkin was born in 1848 in Kholmsky Uyezd, Pskov Governorate, in the Russian Empire. His father, a retired army captain, came from landed gentry. Educated in the Cadet Corps and Pavlovsky Military School, Kuropatkin entered the Imperial Russian Army in 1864. On August 8, 1866, he was promoted to lieutenant in the 1st Turkestan Infantry Battalion, and took part in the conquest of Bukhara, the storming of Samarkand and other battles in the Russian conquest of Turkestan. He was promoted to major in August 1870.

From 1872 to 1874, Kuropatkin studied at the Nicholas General Staff Academy, after which he was dispatched as a military attaché to Berlin and Paris, completing his military studies, and with the French troops in French Algeria, accompanying a French expedition to Sahara. Returning to Russia in late 1875, he was assigned to the Turkestan Military District. He was awarded the Order of St. George (4th class) for his role in the Russian conquest of Kokand.

From 1875-1876, Kuropatkin was employed in a diplomatic mission to Yaqub Beg (ruler of Kashgaria) to resolve the issues of Russian border claims in the Fergana Valley.

From September 1877 to September 1878, he was Chief of Staff of the 16th Infantry Division. In August 1879, he was commander of the Turkestan Rifle Brigade. In December 1880, he and 5 companies made an 18-day march across 500 miles of desert to join General Mikhail Skobelev’s invasion of Turkmenistan. Kuropatkin led the main assault at the Battle of Geok Tepe on January 24, 1881. He was awarded the Order of St. George (3rd class) for his victory in the battle. After the war, he wrote a detailed and critical history of the operations which was highly regarded.

During the 1880s, Kuropatkin served on the south-eastern frontier in command of the Turkestan Rifle Brigade. He was promoted to major general on January 29, 1882. He joined the General Staff the following year, and was promoted to lieutenant general in 1890.

From 1890 to 1898, Kuropatkin was governor of the Transcaspian Region in Central Asia, based in Askhabad. During his tenure, he was known to have developed trade, agriculture and towns in an area formerly known for endemic banditry and slavery. He established a local judicial and school system, and encouraged the settlement of colonists from the interior provinces of the Russian Empire.

In 1895 on Kuropatkin was bestowed the extraordinary Russian mission, called the Extraordinary Embassy to Persia in order to proclaim the ascension to the throne of Nicholas II. One member of the mission was Pavel Piasetsky, who later painted his famous Panorama of Persia, showing the way from Anzali to Teheran.

=== Minister of War ===
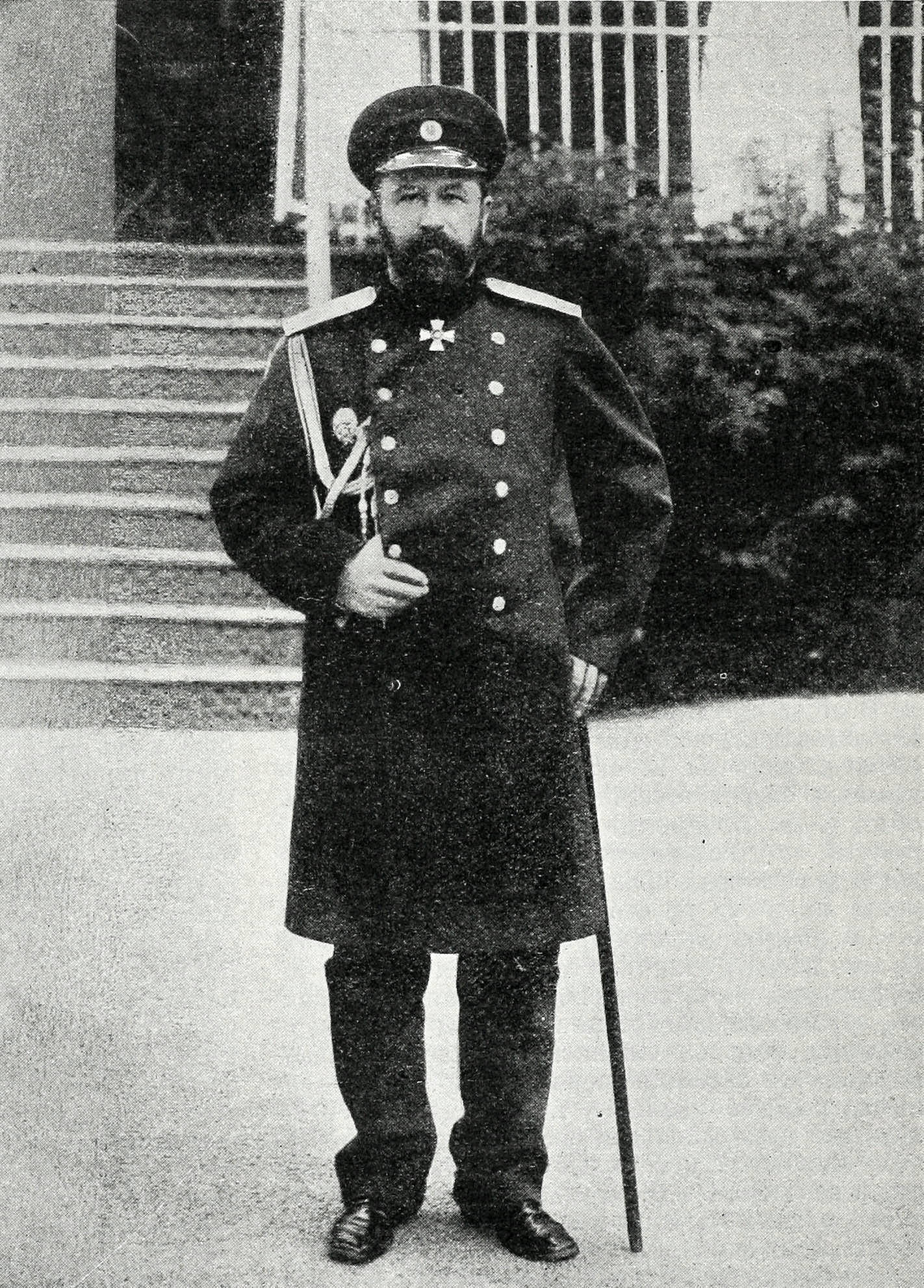
General Aleksey Kuropatkin

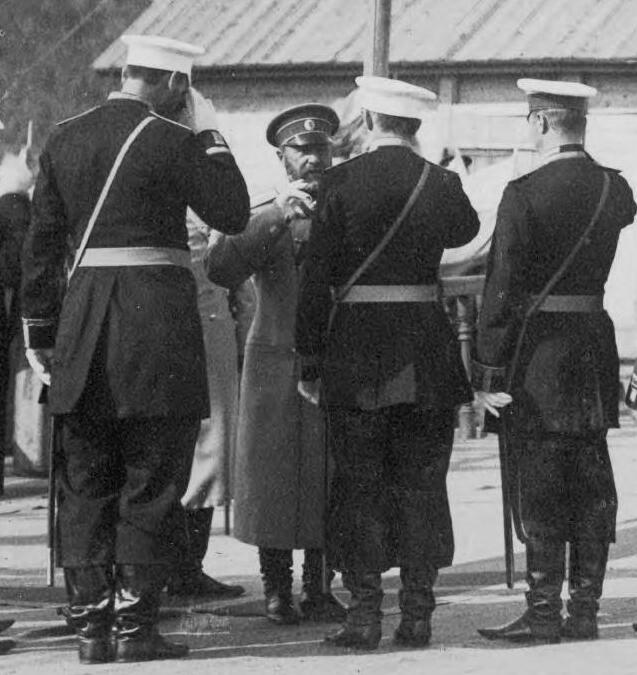
Kuropatkin greeting soldiers at Alexandrovsk-Sakhalinsky in 1903

In 1898, Kuropatkin was recalled to St. Petersburg and appointed War Minister. His first priority was of improving the command structure of the army, as well as the living conditions of its officers. His reforms included measures to rejuvenate the army by setting age limits for line officers and candidates for higher office, and by increasing the period of secondment of officers from the General Staff to combat units. He attempted to improve the quality of officers by raising the two-year cadet training program to three years, and by opening seven new cadet schools. He also increased the frequency of training maneuvers.

However, with respect to the lower ranks, Kuropatkin's reforms fell short. While aware of the poor standards of food, clothing, and housing, he was unable to secure the necessary funds for improvements, so his activities were confined to improving morale through the increased use of chaplains, the abolition of corporal punishment, and improved field kitchens.

=== Russo-Japanese War ===
Kuropatkin was involved in the negotiations with the Empire of Japan before the Russo-Japanese War in 1904. He did not support an armed conflict with Japan and opposed the Bezobrazov Circle. His views became firmer after a visit to Japan in June 1903.

Kuropatkin was heavily involved in the fiasco of the Russian land forces during the war. Although the rationale of his military approach was to wage a war of attrition and to avoid an offensive until the Trans-Siberian Railway brought sufficient troops and materiel, his cautiousness and hesitancy markedly influenced the repeated Russian defeats. Military historians consider his indecisiveness and organizational deficiencies in directing large-scale military operations as a major element in the Russian defeat. Kuropatkin also was influenced by his racism against Asians, reportedly telling the Tsar that he would only need two Russian soldiers for every three Japanese soldiers.

After the Russian defeat at the Battle of Mukden, Kuropatkin was relieved of command and handed over his post to Nikolai Linevich, formerly commander of the 1st Manchurian Army. However, he insisted that he stay at the front and was given permission to take over Linevich's old post.

In 1906, following the end of the Russo-Japanese War, Kuropatkin served as a member of the State Council of Imperial Russia. However, in 1907 he retired to his country house, and wrote his own, yet candid, defense, which was published in a number of books in several languages. The Russian government reportedly confiscated the history he wrote.

=== World War I ===
At the start of World War I, Kuropatkin requested to be reinstated and to be sent to the front; however, his requests were blocked by Grand Duke Nikolai Nikolaevich. Nevertheless, once Tsar Nicholas II assumed the post of Supreme Commander, he put Kuropatkin in charge of the Grenadier Corps in October, 1915. At the end of January 1916, he was appointed commander of the 5th Army, and in February 1916, he became Commander of the Northern Front, in succession to General Pavel Plehve, whose health had broken down. In early March, his forces undertook a limited offensive near Riga, but were outflanked and forced to withdraw to the Daugava River. A second and larger offensive later that month only managed to advance a couple of kilometers. Tsar Nicholas II did not accept Kuropatkin's excuses of a lack of artillery support, poor roads and bad weather. He planned a night attack which included setting up batteries of searchlights to blind the German defenders, a tactic which had worked in 1904 against Japanese troops. Unfortunately for his men in 1915, on being sent 'over the top', they were silhouetted and suffered thousands of casualties.

Kuropatkin was relieved of command on July 22, 1916, and reassigned to Turkestan, where the Russian involvement in World War I, especially against the Ottoman Empire was extremely unpopular among the indigenous peoples and which had led to the Central Asian revolt of 1916. Kuropatkin served as Governor-General of the Turkestan Military District as well as ataman of the Semirechye Cossacks, leading the brutal suppression of the revolt.

=== Post-Revolution ===
In the February Revolution of 1917 Kuropatkin was in Petrograd, and quickly pledged his allegiance to the Russian Provisional Government, cutting the royal insignia off his epaulettes. He was confirmed in his post as commander of the Turkestan Military District by Provisional Government War Minister Alexander Guchkov. However, this was disputed by the Bolshevik Tashkent Soviet of Soldiers and Workers' Deputies, who placed him under arrest and sent him back to Petrograd. Freed by order of the Provisional Government, he returned to his home province. Following the October Revolution, he became very skilled at playing the violin and taught at an agriculture school that he had founded, until his death in 1925.

=== Writings ===
- 1882 – Kashgaria, Eastern or Chinese Turkistan: Historical and Geographical Sketch of the Country, its Military Strength, Industries, and Trade. Calcutta, Thacker, Spink and Co., etc. etc. 1882.
- 1909 – The Russian Army and the Japanese War, being historical and critical Comments on the Military Policy and Power of Russia and on the Campaign in the Far East. 1909.

== Honours ==
- Order of St. Alexander Nevsky, with diamonds
- Order of St. George, 4th class,
- Order of St. George, 3rd class,
- Order of the White Eagle
- Order of St Vladimir 4th degree
- Order of St Vladimir 3rd degree
- Order of St Vladimir 2nd degree
- Order of St. Stanislaus 3rd degree
- Order of St. Stanislaus 2nd degree
- Order of St. Stanislaus 1st degree.
- Order of St. Anne 3rd degree
- Order of St. Anne 2nd degree
- Order of St. Anne 1st degree

Foreign

- France: Legion of Honor, Chevalier
- Kingdom of Romania: Order of the Star of Romania
- Kingdom of Bulgaria: Order of St Alexander
- Kingdom of Italy: Grand Cordon of the Order of Saints Maurice and Lazarus - July 1902 - during a visit to Russia of King Victor Emmanuel III of Italy

== Sources ==
- Chisholm, Hugh, ed. (1911). "Kuropatkin, Alexei Nikolaievich" . Encyclopædia Britannica. Vol. 15 (11th ed.). Cambridge University Press. pp. 952–953.
- «Personal» // «The Advertiser, Adelaide», Monday 26 January 1925, p. 9
- Alfred Knox. General Kuropatkin. The Slavonic Review, Vol. 4, No. 10 (Jun., 1925), pp. 164–168
- Kowner, Rotem (2006). "Historical Dictionary of the Russo-Japanese War". Scarecrow. 620pp. ISBN 0-8108-4927-5
- Kashgaria, Eastern Or Chinese Turkistan: Historical and Geographical Sketch of the Country, Its Military Strength, Industries, and Trade. By Aleksei Nikolaevich Kuropatkin. Translated by Walter Edward Gowan. Published by Thacker, Spink and Co., 1882
  - Kessinger Publishing. 2004. ISBN 1-4179-1928-0.
  - McCutchen Press. 2008. ISBN 1-4086-7524-2.
- The Russian Army and the Japanese War: Being Historical and Critical Comments on the Military Policy and Power of Russia and on the Campaign in the Far East. By Aleksei Nikolaevich Kuropatkin. Translated by Alexander Bertram Lindsay. E.P. Dutton, 1909. Volume I Volume II
- Connaughton, R.M (1988). The War of the Rising Sun and the Tumbling Bear—A Military History of the Russo-Japanese War 1904–5, London, ISBN 0-415-00906-5.
- Jukes, Geoffry. The Russo-Japanese War 1904–1905. Osprey Essential Histories. (2002). ISBN 978-1-84176-446-7.
- Warner, Denis & Peggy. The Tide at Sunrise, A History of the Russo-Japanese War 1904–1905. (1975). ISBN 0-7146-5256-3.

Military offices
Preceded by Pyotr Vannovskiy	Minister of War; 1 January 1898 – 7 February 1904	Succeeded by Viktor Sakharov
