= Panorama of Persia =

Painting by Pavel Yakovlevich Pyasetsky showing the way from Anzali to Tehran

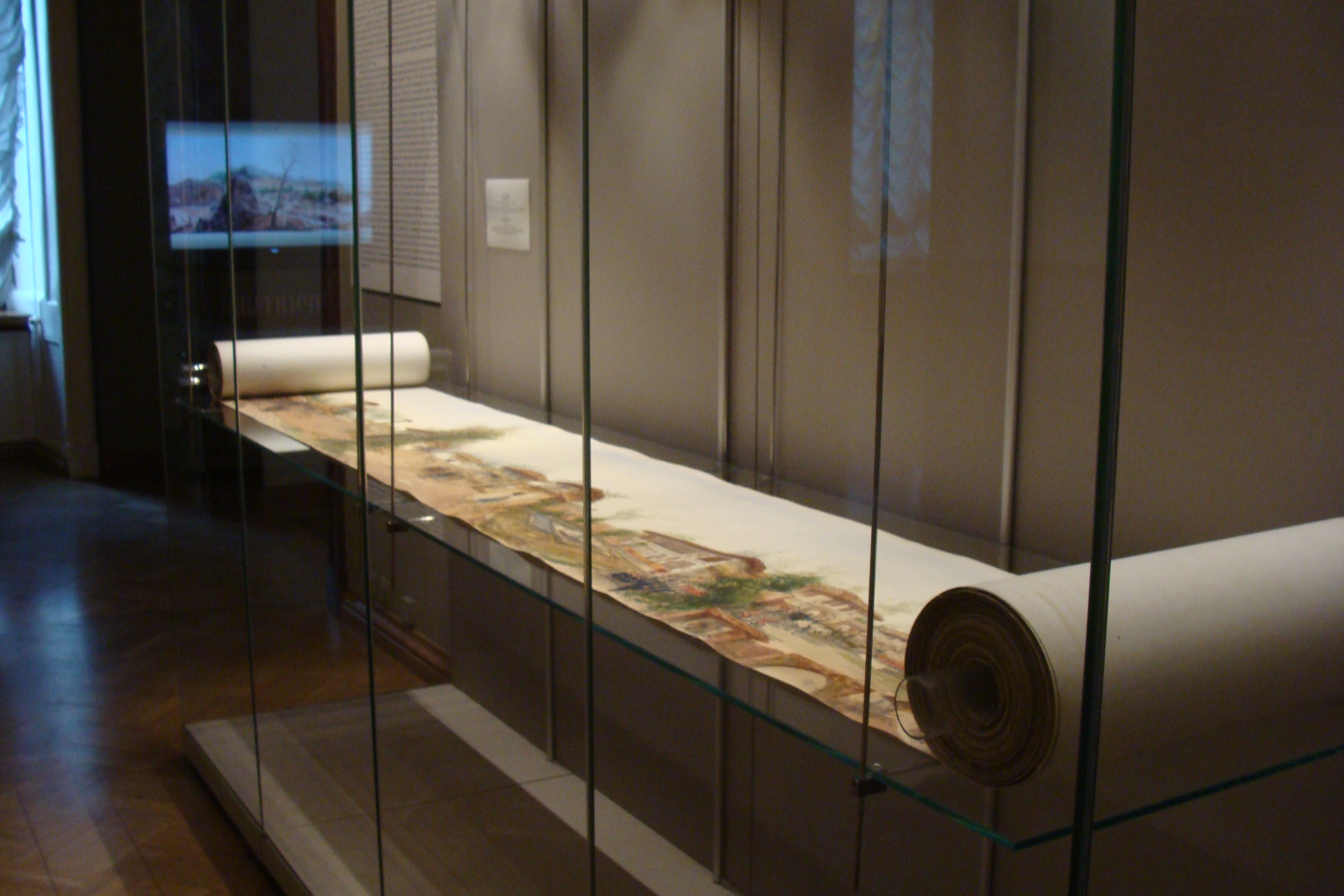
"Panorama of Persia" scroll by Pavel Piasetsky. The scroll measures 59.6 × 48.5 cm. It is the property of the State Hermitage Museum and went on display there in September 2015 as part of the "Culture and art of Iran of the VIII-early XX centuries" exhibition (State Hermitage Museum), 2nd floor, room no 389

Panorama of Persia officially "Panorama of Persia En Route of the Extraordinary Embassy of Russia Headed by Lieutenant-General A. N. Kuropatkin, from Enzeli to Teheran" is a painting by Pavel Yakovlevich Pyasetsky showing the way from Anzali to Tehran. It was finished in February 1895 in Ashgabat with paper, watercolour, white pigment and graphite pencil materials. It is now the property of the State Hermitage Museum in Saint-Petersburg, Russia.

Pavel Pyasetsky was among the members of the mission under command of Aleksey Kuropatkin. In 1895 Kuropatkin was bestowed the extraordinary Russian mission, called the Extraordinary Embassy to Persia in order to proclaim the accession to the throne of Nicholas II. Pavel Pyasetsky later painted his famous Panorama of Persia.
