= Russian cruiser Afrika =

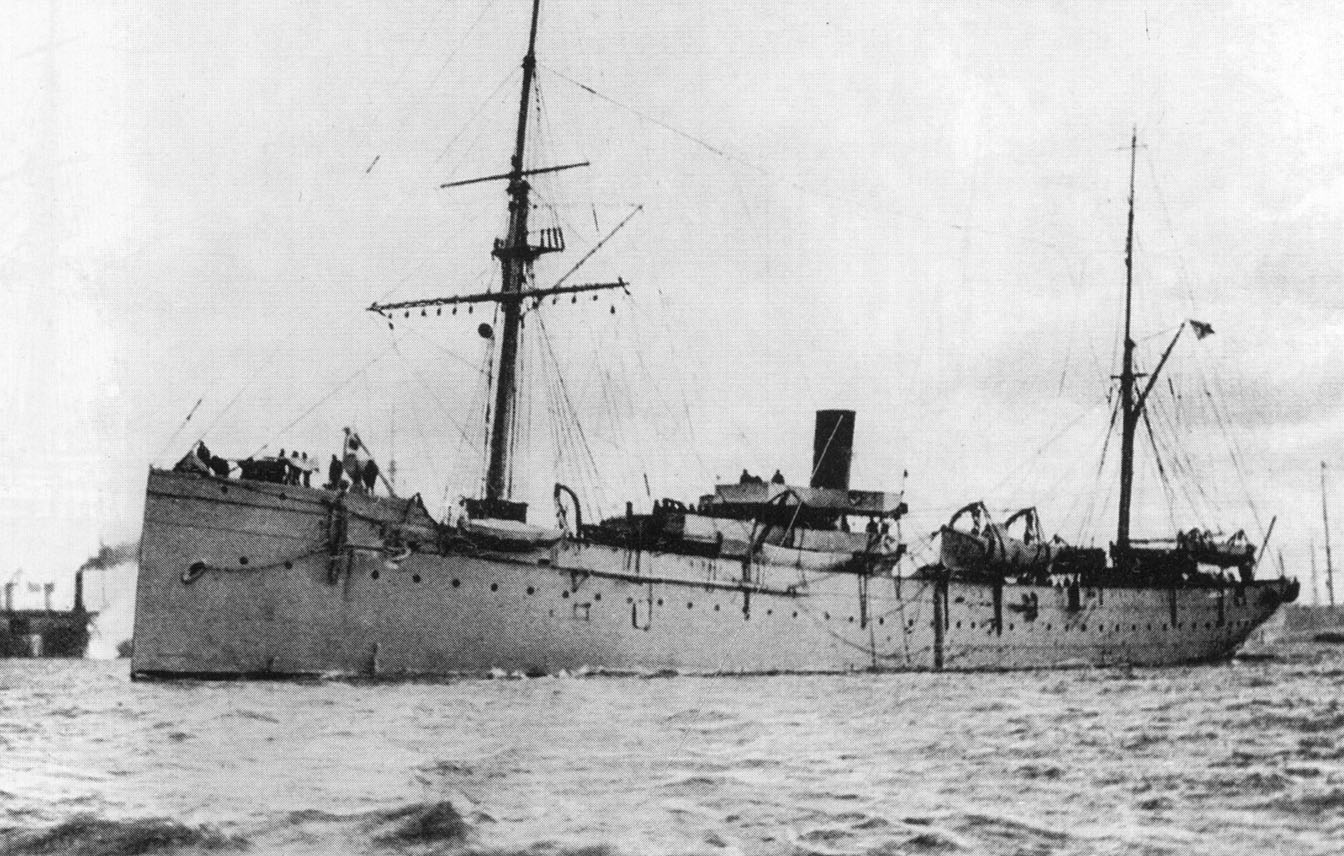

Afrika (Russian - Африка) was a sail- and steam-powered second-class cruiser of the Imperial Russian Navy. She was 2775 tonnes, 83 m long, 11.06 m in the beam and had four boilers powering a single vertical triple expansion steam engine. Her maximum speed was 12.75 knots, whilst her crew was 148 sailors and 12 officers. Those who served aboard her included Alexey Abaza and Hans William von Fersen.

Built by John Roach and Sons at the Delaware River Iron Ship Building and Engine Works shipyard in Chester, Pennsylvania, she was launched in May 1877 under the name Saratoga. She was acquired by Russia exactly a year later for $335,000 and sailed for Europe on 29 December 1878 under her first captain Yevgeni Ivanovich Alekseyev. She anchored at Kronstadt in summer 1879 to have her armament installed - this became her home port. These were five 152 mm guns, four 107 mm guns and 25.04 mm guns. She was accepted into the Russian fleet on 1 February 1879. In 1882 geographers aboard her surveyed parts of the Kamchatka Peninsula, naming its easternmost point Cape Afrika after the ship.

Her second captain Fyodor Vazsilievitch Dubasov was appointed on 2 November 1883. New boilers were installed in winter 1891–1892. In 1898 two torpedo tubes were added and her third captain was appointed, Nikolai Dmitrievitch Dabitch, who held the command until 1900. Also in 1898 admiral Alexei Popov made the first Russian naval wireless telegraphy transmission from Afrika to the transport ship Europe. In March 1906 she was converted into a naval school, before being permanently anchored in October 1918. She was attached to the Baltic Fleet in December 1920 for use as a transport ship and floating artillery depot, before being sold for scrap to Germany in September 1923.
