= Yevgeni Ivanovich Alekseyev =

Russian admiral (1843–1917)

- Евге́ний Ива́нович Алексе́ев
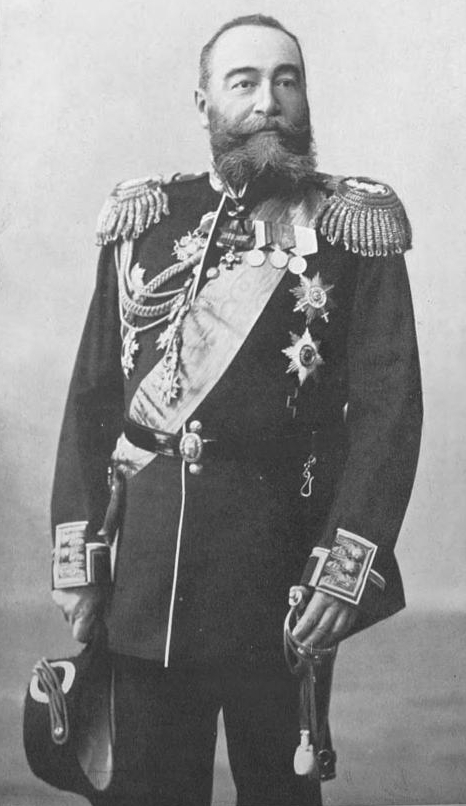

Viceroy of the Russian Far East
- In office 13 August 1903 – 12 October 1904
- Monarch: Nicholas II

Personal details
- Born: May 13, 1843 St Petersburg, Russian Empire
- Died: May 27, 1917 (aged 74) Yalta, Taurida Governorate, Russia

Military service
- Allegiance: Russian Empire
- Branch/service: Imperial Russian Navy
- Years of service: 1859–1904
- Rank: Admiral
- Battles/wars: Boxer Rebellion; Siege of the International Legations; Russian invasion of Manchuria; Russo-Japanese War

Yevgeni Ivanovich Alekseyev or Alexeyev (Russian: Евге́ний Ива́нович Алексе́ев; b. 23 May [O.S. 11 May] 1843 – d. May 27, 1917) was a Russian admiral in the Imperial Russian Navy, viceroy of the Russian Far East, and commander-in-chief of Imperial Russian forces at Port Arthur and in Manchuria during the first year of the Russo-Japanese War of 1904–05.

== Biography ==
According to rumor, Alekseyev was an illegitimate son of Emperor Alexander II (r. 1855–1881). Alekseyev was raised by the family of Lieutenant Ivan Maximovich Alekseyev (1796–1849) in Sevastopol.

At the age of 13 Alexeyev attended the Naval Cadet Corps and completed his training three years later. He was assigned as a midshipman for four years to the corvette Varyag on a world tour. Commissioned as an ensign in 1867, he served on numerous ships in the Imperial Russian Navy including the ironclad Kniaz Pozharsky, and in 1878 received his first command: the cruiser Afrika, which he commanded on a voyage around the world from 1880 to 1883.

From 1883 to 1888 Alexeyev served as a naval attaché to France; he was promoted to the rank of captain in 1886. During this time he took the place of Grand Duke Alexei Alexandrovich who was in jail after he was arrested for a drunken fight at a brothel in Marseille, winning the Grand Duke's patronage. After his return to Russia in 1889 he was given command of the protected cruiser Admiral Kornilov. In 1891 he made another round-the-world cruise, this time accompanied by the Tsarevich Nicholas (the future Tsar Nicholas II, r. 1894–1917)—during the Eastern journey of Nicholas II.

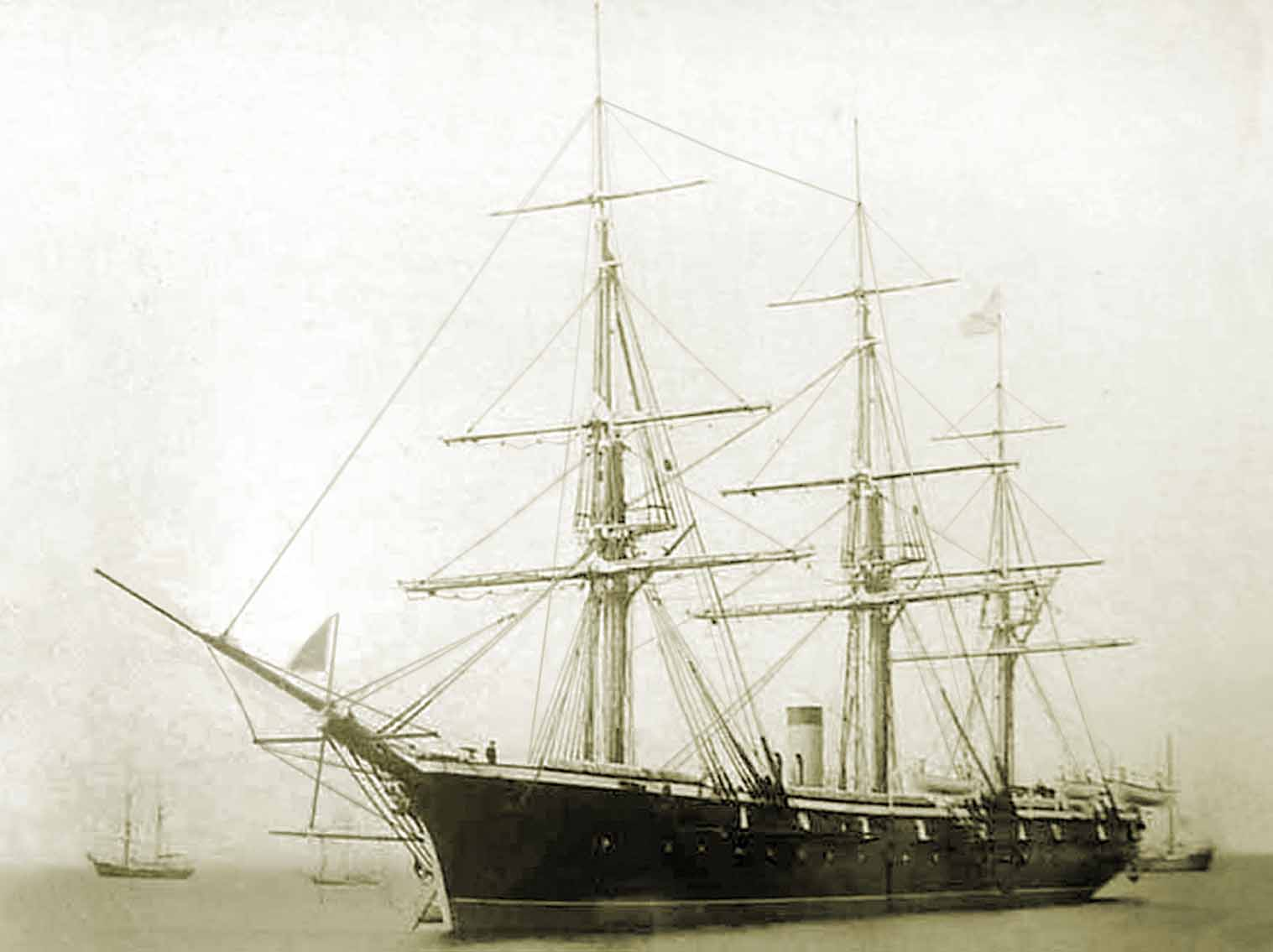
The corvette Varyag

Alexeyev was promoted to rear admiral in 1892 and served on the General Staff of the Imperial Russian Navy, becoming vice admiral in 1894 and deputy chief-of-staff in 1895. From 1895 to 1897 he commanded the Russian Pacific Fleet, initially at Vladivostok, and from December 1897, at Port Arthur in the southern Liaodong Peninsula leased from Qing-dynasty China. In 1898 he was appointed governor of the Kwantung Fortified Region, and was again named commander of the Russian Pacific Fleet from 1899. He participated in the suppression of the Boxer Rebellion of 1899-1901 in China as commander of an army corps, following an appointment by War Minister Aleksey Kuropatkin and was promoted to Adjutant general.

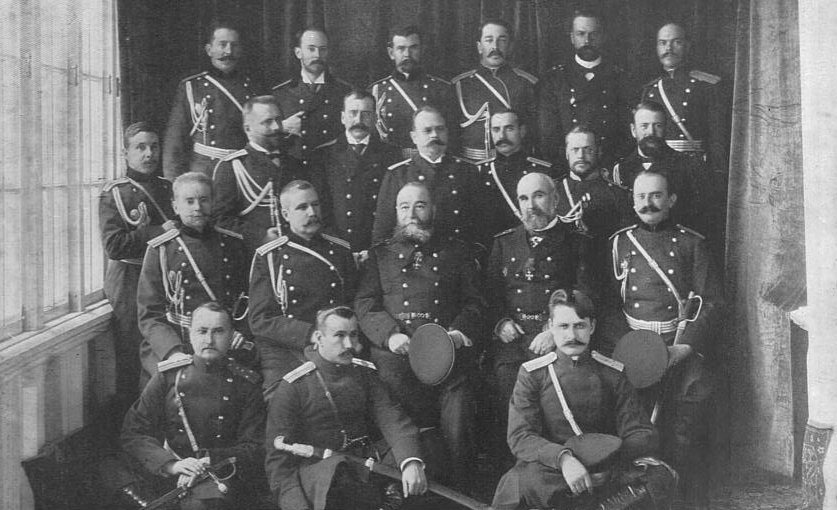
Admiral Alekseyev and his field headquarters, 1900

The failure of Russia to withdraw its forces from Manchuria as scheduled after the end of the Boxer Rebellion further alarmed the Empire of Japan, still upset by the Triple Intervention, by Russian de facto annexation of the Liaodong Peninsula and by increasing Russian influence over the Korean Empire – all of which the Japanese deemed detrimental to their interests and national security.

Alexeyev was a key member of the "Bezobrazov Circle", a politically-motivated investment-group organized by Aleksandr Mikhailovich Bezobrazov, whose investors included many members of the highest level in the Russian court. The "Bezobrazov Circle" aimed to establish a commercial enterprise reminiscent of the British East India Company which would reward its investors with financial benefits while setting the stage for the conquest of Manchuria and Korea. Alexeyev reassured the Emperor that increased aggressive action in the region would not provoke a military response from Japan.

On August 13, 1903, Emperor Nicolas II appointed Alexeyev as Far Eastern viceroy, with all civil and military authority over Russian possessions in the Far East, including Russian-occupied Manchuria, the Liaodong Peninsula, and Russia's Amur Military District (present-day Primorsky Krai). As viceroy, he was beyond the jurisdiction of any ministry and reported directly to the Tsar; however, his exact functions remained poorly defined—historian Ian Nish stated: "he himself was unclear about the extent of his autonomy... In any event Alekseyev, who already had been given in May very great powers of coordination, did not greatly welcome the new title and almost declined to accept it."

With the outbreak of the Russo-Japanese War on February 9, 1904, Alexeyev became commander of all Russian land and naval forces in the Far East. He assumed direct command over the Russian Pacific Squadron after the dismissal of Vice Admiral Oskar Stark (February 24, 1904) until the arrival of Vice Admiral Stepan Makarov (March 8, 1904), and again after Makarov's death (13 April [O.S. 31 March] 1904) until the appointment (April 1, 1904) of Vice Admiral Nikolai Skrydlov.

On land, Alexeyev had serious and continual disagreements with General Aleksey Kuropatkin, the former Minister of War, over the strategy employed against the Japanese. Alexeyev forced Kuropatkin to take a more aggressive position, despite Kuropatkin's insistence on waging a defensive war of attrition until the completion of the Trans-Siberian Railroad, which would bring reinforcements and supplies. Following a direct order from the Tsar, Alexeyev left Port Arthur on May 5, 1904, for Mukden, and following the Russian defeat at the Battle of Shaho (5 to 17 October 1904, New Style), was relieved of his command and ordered back to St. Petersburg on October 12, 1904.

In June 1905 the post of viceroy was abolished, and Alexeyev became a member of the State Council of Imperial Russia. In his later years he moved to Russian Armenia and worked as a school teacher. In April 1917, in the wake of the February Revolution and the abdication of Emperor Nikolai II in March 1917, he retired from public life. He died a few weeks later in Yalta, on 9 June [O.S. 27 May] 1917.

== Honors ==
- Order of St. Stanislaus, 3rd degree, 1871
- Order of the Crown of Italy, Officer's Cross 1873 (Italy)
- Order of St Vladimir, 4th degree with bow, 1875 .
- Order of Osmanieh, 4th degree 1876 (Ottoman Empire)
- Order of St. Stanislaus, 2nd degree 1877.
- Order of St. Anne, 2nd degree 1879
- Legion of Honor, Commander, 1888 (France)
- Order of the Redeemer, Commander's Cross 1889 (Greece)
- Order of St Vladimir, 3rd degree, 1890
- Order of St. Stanislaus, 1st degree, 1894
- Order of St. Anne, 1st degree, 1896
- Order of the Double Dragon, 1886 (China)
- Order of the Rising Sun, 1st degree, 1896 (Japan)
- Order of St Vladimir, 2nd degree, 1898
- Order of the White Eagle, with swords, 1901
- Legion of Honor, Grand Croix, 1901 (France)
- Order of the Red Eagle, 1st class with swords, 1901 (Prussia)
- Order of Leopold II, Grand Cross, 1901 (Belgium)
- Order of St. George, 3rd class, 1903
- Order of St. Alexander Nevsky, 1906
- Order of St Vladimir, 1st degree, 1915
