= Russian cruiser Izumrud =

Imperial Russian Navy ship (1904–05)

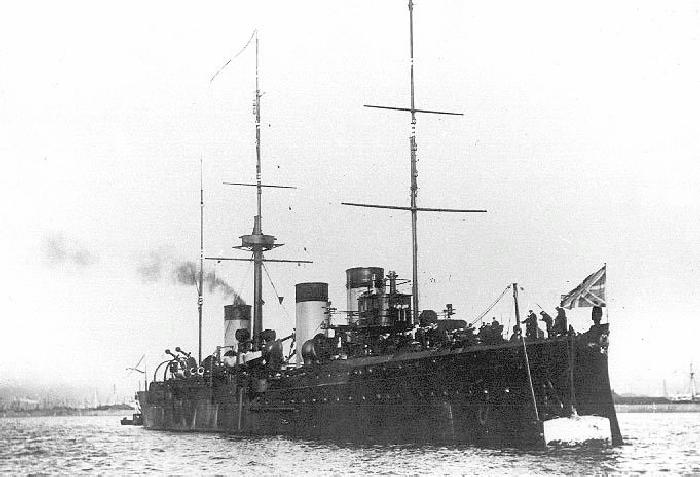

History

Russian Empire
- Name: Izumrud
- Builder: Nevski Works, Russia
- Laid down: 1 January 1901
- Launched: 1 October 1903
- Commissioned: January 1904
- Fate: Wrecked near Vladivostok, 29 May 1905

General characteristics
- Type: Protected cruiser
- Displacement: 3,103 long tons (3,153 t)
- Length: 111 m (364 ft 2 in)
- Beam: 12.2 m (40 ft)
- Draught: 5 m (16 ft 5 in)
- Installed power: 16 Yarrow boilers; 17,000 ihp (13,000 kW)
- Propulsion: 3 shafts, 3 triple-expansion steam engines
- Speed: 24 knots (44 km/h; 28 mph)
- Range: 3,790 nmi (7,020 km; 4,360 mi)
- Complement: 350
- Armament: 8 × 120 mm (4.7 in) Canet guns; 4 × 47 mm (1.9 in) Hotchkiss guns; 6 × 7.62 mm Maxim machine guns; 4 × 457 mm (18 in) torpedo tubes
- Armour: Krupp armour; 32–76 mm (1.3–3.0 in) on sloping deck; 32 mm (1.3 in) on belt

The wreck of Izumrud

Izumrud (Russian: Изумруд, meaning "Emerald") was a protected cruiser of the Imperial Russian Navy, and the lead ship in the two-ship Izumrud class. Izumrud and her sister ship Zhemchug were based on the German-built Novik.

== Background ==
Izumrud was ordered as part of the Imperial Russian Navy's plan to expand the Russian Pacific Fleet based at Port Arthur and Vladivostok to counter the growing threat posed by the Imperial Japanese Navy towards Russian hegemony in Manchuria and Korea.

== Operational history ==
Izumrud was laid down at the Nevski Works in Saint Petersburg, Russia on 1 January 1901. However, construction was delayed due to priority given to completion of Novik. The Zakladka, or formal ceremony of laying a plate, took place on 14 June 1902. Izumrud was launched on 1 October 1903. Construction continued to be plagued by delays, including an ice storm in December. However, with the start of the Russo-Japanese War in early 1904, construction efforts were greatly accelerated.

Izumrud was formally commissioned in January 1904 and she was assigned to the Second Pacific Squadron of the Russian Pacific Fleet.

=== During the Russo-Japanese War ===
Under the overall command of Admiral Zinovy Rozhestvensky, Izumrud was part of the Second Pacific Squadron intended to relieve the Japanese siege of Port Arthur. Captained by Commander Vasili Fersen, she participated in the decisive Battle of Tsushima from 27–28 May 1905. At the end of the battle, Fersen refused to obey the order of Admiral Nikolai Nebogatov to surrender, and used her speed to escape through the Japanese blockade. However, on the night of 28 May, she ran aground in Vladimir Bay 43°54′N 135°30′E in the Russian Maritime Province. She was destroyed by explosive charges set by her crew, who later reached Vladivostok by land.
