= Bezobrazov =

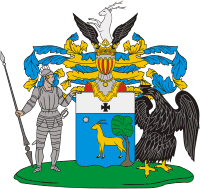
Coat of arms of Bezobrazov family

The Bezobrazov family (Russian: Безобра́зов) was a prominent Russian noble family, whose members held significant positions within the Russian Empire.

== History ==
The family first appeared in written documents in the 15th century. They had numerous noble untitled branches and the branch of the family that held the title of Count Chernyshev-Bezobrazov.

== Notable members ==
- Aleksandr Aleksandrovich Bezobrazov (fl. 1914), army officer, aviator, aircraft designer
- Aleksandr Mikhailovich Bezobrazov (1783–1871), governor of St. Petersburg, Yaroslavl and Tambov
- Aleksandr Mikhailovich Bezobrazov (1855–1931), businessman and political adventurer
- Petr Bezobrazov (1845–1906), naval officer
- Vladimir Bezobrazov (1828–1889), economist
