= Ilya Levitov =

Russian journalist and ethnographer

Ilya Semenovich Levitov (Russian: Илья Семенович Левитов; c. 1850–1918) was a Russian journalist and ethnographer.

== Life and works ==
Ilya Semenovich Levitov was born in the town of Alyoshki, Taurida Governorate of the Russian Empire in 1850. In 1870–72 he enrolled at Novorossiysk University. In 1873 he transferred to Heidelberg University in Germany, where he was influenced by the entrepreneur and explorer A. M. Sibiryakov. He was the author of several guidebooks.

He later served in the shipping company of A. M. Sibiryakov in Siberia, becoming secretary of the temporary Tyumen committee for providing assistance to settlers (since 1884).

He was a participant in trips to Manchuria, China, Japan, India, Indochina and Europe. He also worked with the city administration of Port Arthur, where he collaborated with "Novy Kray". During the siege of Port Arthur during the Russo-Japanese War, Levitov's diaries and notes were lost. He was also an author of publications about settlers in Siberia.

== The idea of "Yellow Russia" ==
Levitov is considered to be the author of the term "Yellow Russia". In a number of articles and brochures, he proposed and developed a project to create a colonial territory on the far southeastern borders of the Russian Empire – "Yellow Russia", namely the Chinese regions of Manchuria and Xinjiang. In 1905 he wrote: "By Yellow Russia, I mean the space where the Russian element is blended with the yellow race, especially the region stretching from Lake Baikal to the Pacific Ocean."

"Yellow Russia" would have provided the Russian Empire with the possibility of expansion in the direction of the Yellow Sea, unrestricted access to the Pacific Ocean with warm-water ports and would have served as a buffer between the Russian Empire and Japan. This concept caused a debate among Russian publicists who supported colonial expansion in the period preceding the war with Japan.

== Works ==
- Guide to the Sights of Moscow (1881)
- Guide to the center of Moscow (1882)
- Moscow to Tomsk // Russian Thought, 1883. - Book 7. - Pp. 1-30, (2nd pag.).|
- Guide to Western Siberia (1884)
- Siberian Monopolists (1892)
- Siberian Kites (1893)
- Yellow Russia. Report (St. Petersburg, 1901)
- Yellow Russia as a buffer colony (St. Petersburg, 1905)
- Standard of Russian spinning materials and its national significance (St. Petersburg, 1913)
