= Karl Jessen =

Russian vice-admiral (1852–1918)

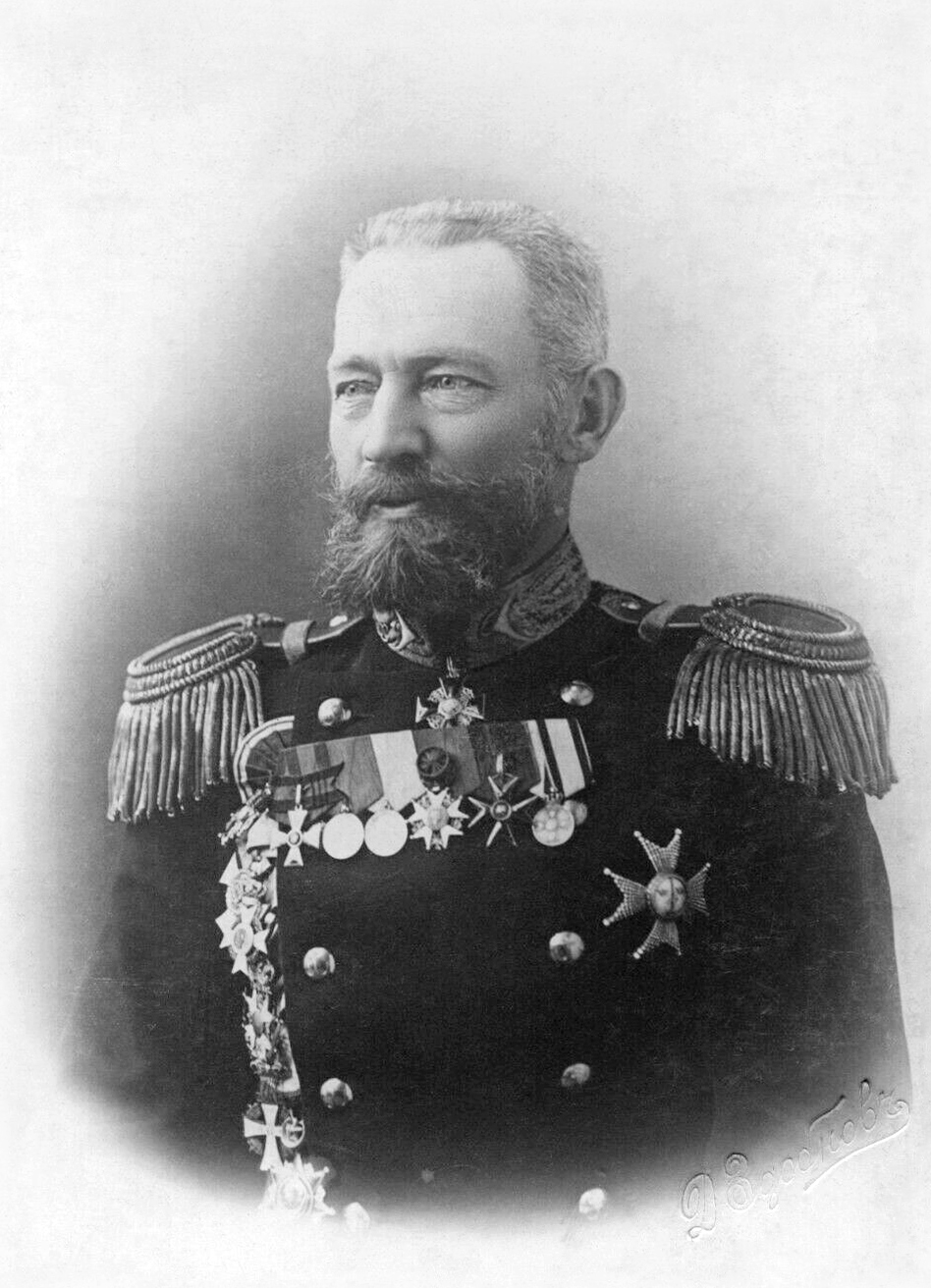
- Portrait, 1902
- Born: 30 June 1852; Dorpat, Governorate of Livonia, Russian Empire
- Died: 30 November 1918 (aged 66); Petrograd, Russia
- Military career
- Allegiance: Russia
- Branch: Imperial Russian Navy
- Service years: 1879–1916
- Rank: Vice-admiral
- Conflicts: Russo Japanese War

Karl Johann Peter Jessen (Russian: Карл Петрович Иессен, romanized: Karl Petrovich Iessen; 30 June 1852 – 30 November 1918) was a Vice admiral in the Imperial Russian Navy during the Russo-Japanese War.

== Biography ==
Jessen was of Danish descent, born in Livonia, where his father, Hans Peter Boje Jessen was a doctor of veterinary medicine. He graduated from the Sea Cadets in 1875 and was commissioned as a lieutenant on 18 July 1879. He graduated from the school of mine warfare in 1881, and for naval artillery in 1884. He was assigned as mine warfare officer on several vessels, and was briefly assigned as a military attache to Germany. In 1890, he was given command of the destroyer Adler with the Russian Black Sea Fleet.

Between 1891 and 1893, Jessen was executive officer on the protected cruiser Admiral Kornilov, assigned to the Russian Baltic Fleet and the Far East. From 1894 to 1895 he was commander aboard the steamship Neva. From 1895 to 1896 he commanded the cruiser Asia. In 1897, Jessen was promoted captain, 1st rank. From 1898 to 1905 he assumed command of the cruiser Gromoboi, which was assigned to the Russian Pacific Fleet.

On 1 January 1904, Jessen was promoted to the rank of rear admiral. With the start of the Russo-Japanese War on 8 February, he was appointed deputy commander of Port Arthur and used the battleship Sevastopol as his flagship. However, on 10 March, Vice-Admiral Makarov reassigned Jessen to command the cruiser squadron based at Vladivostok, and he transferred his flag to the armored cruiser Rossia. This cruiser squadron conducted commerce raiding and other offensive operations while the remainder of the Russian Pacific Fleet remained bottled in Port Arthur by a Japanese blockade.

Jessen's operations threatened Japanese shipping and supply lines, and resulted in the Imperial Japanese Navy appointing Admiral Kamimura Hikonojo to command the IJN 2nd Fleet to track down and destroy his squadron. Jessen evaded the Japanese on several occasions, sinking a number of vessels in the Sea of Japan. From 12 June he was briefly replaced by Vice Admiral Petr Bezobrazov.

On 14 August 1904, during the Battle off Ulsan, he fought an inconclusive engagement against the Japanese fleet under Admiral Kamimura. During the engagement, Gromoboï was badly damaged, with 94 crewmen killed and 182 wounded and Rurik forced to scuttle, with 204 crewman killed and 305 wounded. In recognition of his efforts in the battle, he was awarded the Order of St. George (fourth grade).

On 9 November 1904, Jessen was appointed commander of the 1st Squadron of the Pacific Fleet. However, with the fall of Port Arthur to the Japanese, he played no further offensive role, and concentrated on coastal defense of the region around Vladivostok with his much depleted forces. In November 1905, he led the remaining Russian ships back to Baltic Sea, where they arrived in April 1906. After his return to Petrograd, he was reprimanded and faced a court martial, accepting a promotion to the rank of vice-admiral and an honorable discharge from the navy in 1908.

In 1912, he became owner of the Myulgrabenskoy shipyard near Riga. In 1913, his firm received a contract to build nine new destroyers as part of the program to rebuild the Russian Baltic Fleet. Karl Petrovich Jessen died in 1918 in Petrograd.

== Honors ==
- Order of St. Anne, 3rd degree, (01/01/1889).
- Order of St Vladimir, 4th degree in 18 companies, (17/01/1895).
- Order of St. Anne 2nd degree, (06/12/1897).
- Order of St. George, 4th degree (09/27/1904).
- Order of St. Stanislaus, 1st degree, (06/07/1904).

== Sources ==
- Connaughton, R. M (1988). The War of the Rising Sun and the Tumbling Bear—A Military History of the Russo-Japanese War 1904–5, London, ISBN 0-415-00906-5.
- Jukes, Geoffry. The Russo-Japanese War 1904–1905. Osprey Essential Histories. (2002). ISBN 978-1-84176-446-7.
- Kowner, Rotem (2006). Historical Dictionary of the Russo-Japanese War. The Scarecrow Press. ISBN 0-8108-4927-5.
- Warner, Denis & Peggy. The Tide at Sunrise, A History of the Russo-Japanese War 1904–1905. (1975). ISBN 0-7146-5256-3.
