= Vladimir Bezobrazov =

Russian economist, editor and state official

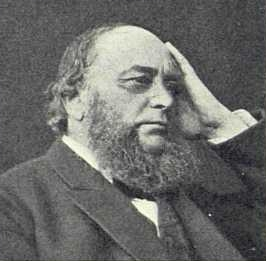
- Born: Владимир Павлович Безобразов; January 15, 1828; Vladimir, Imperial Russia
- Died: August 29, 1889 (aged 61); Noskovo, Moscow Governorate, Imperial Russia
- Occupation: economist • state official • journalist

Vladimir Pavlovich Bezobrazov (Russian: Владимир Павлович Безобразов; 15 January 1828 – 29 August 1889) was one of the leading Russian economists of the 19th century; he was also a state official, magazine editor, publicist and lecturer. He wrote numerous essays and articles, mostly on political economy, the banking system, law, and finance.

== Early life ==
Bezobrazov was born in Vladimir, into an old noble Bezobrazov family. He was the son of Paul Nikolaevich Bezobrazov (1787–1852) and his wife, Elizaveta Pavlovna Poltoratskaya (1798–1888).

== Biography ==
Bezobrazov was a member of the Saint Petersburg Academy of Sciences from 1864. In the 1860s he edited the Ministry of State Properties Magazine, and later the Geographical Society Herald. As a Ministry of Finance official, he took active part in organizing and monitoring Russian regional bank system. In the 1860s, at the height of the Alexander II-induced reforms, he became one of the initiators and leaders of the Russian Geographical Society's Political and Economical committee. In 1868 Bezobrazov was elected the Moscow Governorate's glasny; in 1885 he became a member of the Russian Senate.

He taught political economy and financial law at the Alexandrovsky Lyceum and in the 1870s tutored four members of the Russian monarch's family, Grand Dukes Alexey Alexandrovich, Nikolai Konstantinovich, Sergey Alexandrovich, and Konstantin Konstantinovich.

In 1873 Bezobrazov, part of the team of eleven renowned lawyers, co-founded the Institut de Droit International in Ghent. The same year he started publishing the Russian Knowledge Anthology (Сборник государственных знаний), featuring articles and essays by leading Russian economists and lawyers.

He died on 29 August 1889 in Noskovo, Moscow Governorate.
