= Kholmsky Uyezd (Pskov Governorate) =

Kholmsky Uyezd (Хо́лмский уе́зд) was one of the subdivisions of the Pskov Governorate of the Russian Empire. It was situated in the eastern part of the governorate. Its administrative centre was Kholm.

== Demographics ==
At the time of the Russian Empire Census of 1897, Kholmsky Uyezd had a population of 88,157. Of these, 93.4% spoke Russian, 2.5% Estonian, 1.1% Finnish, 1.1% Latvian, 0.9% Belarusian, 0.6% Yiddish, 0.2% German, 0.1% Polish and 0.1% Romani as their native language.
