= Russian ship of the line Retvizan (1855) =

Wooden-hulled, steam-powered ship for Imperial Russian Navy

History

Russian Empire
- Name: Retvizan
- Builder: New Admiralty Shipyard, St. Petersburg
- Laid down: 17 September 1854 (Note: All dates used in this article are Old Style)
- Launched: 17 September 1855
- In service: 1858
- Stricken: 22 November 1880

General characteristics (as of 1858)
- Type: 81-gun steam-powered ship of the line
- Displacement: 3,823 long tons (3,884 t)
- Tons burthen: 2,641 bm
- Length: 215 ft 10 in (65.8 m) (p/p)
- Beam: 52 ft 8 in (16.1 m)
- Draft: 23 ft 1 in (7.0 m)
- Installed power: 500 nominal horsepower
- Propulsion: 1 shaft; 1 Nobel steam engine
- Speed: 9.5 knots (17.6 km/h; 10.9 mph)
- Armament: 29 × 68-pounder smoothbore shell guns; 8 × long 30-pounder guns; 30 × short 30-pounder guns; 16 × 30-pounder howitzers

Retvizan (Russian: Ретвизан) was a wooden-hulled, steam-powered, 84-gun third-rate ship of the line built for the Imperial Russian Navy in the 1850s. The ship served with the Baltic Fleet until she was stricken from the Navy List in 1880. During that time she was deployed in the Mediterranean for two years. Her engine was removed in 1863 and Retvizan became a training ship in 1874.

== Description, construction and career ==
Retvizan was 215 feet 10 inches (65.8 m) long between perpendiculars, with a beam of 52 feet 8 inches (16.1 m) and a maximum draft of 23 feet 1 inch (7.0 m). The ship displaced 3,823 long tons (3,884 t) and measured 2,641 tons bm. She was equipped with a Russian-built Nobel steam engine of 500 nominal horsepower that drove a single propeller shaft.

All of Retvizan's guns were smoothbores and in 1858 they consisted of one 60-pounder gun on a pivot mount as a chase gun on the forecastle as well as two short 30-pounder guns and ten 30-pounder howitzers distributed between the forecastle and quarterdeck. On her upper deck the ship carried four long 30-pounders and 28 short 30-pounder guns. The armament of her lower deck consisted of twenty-eight 60-pounder shell guns and four long 30-pounder guns. In 1862, all of her 30-pounder weapons were replaced by 36-pounders of exactly the same type. Five years later, her armament was reduced to sixteen 60-pounder shell guns on the lower deck and 16 short 36-pounder guns on the upper deck.

The ship was laid down on 17 September 1854 at the New Admiralty Shipyard in St. Petersburg and launched on 12 August 1854. Retvizan was named after the Swedish ship of the line Rättvisan (meaning The Justice) which was captured by the Russians at the Battle of Viborg Bay in 1790. She conducted her sea trials in 1857 and was deployed in the Mediterranean in 1858–59. The ship returned to the Baltic Sea afterward and cruised with the Baltic Fleet in 1860–62. Her engine was removed in 1863, and Retvizan was placed in reserve until 1874 when she became a gunnery training ship until she was stricken on 22 November 1880. Retvizan was considered the best ship of its type in the navy.
