= Aleksandr Bezobrazov (engineer) =

- Military career
- Allegiance: Russian Army
- Branch: Army

Aleksandr Aleksandrovich Bezobrazov was an army officer and aviator of the Imperial Russian Air Force who constructed an experimental fighter aircraft design in 1914. The type was a single-seat triplane on which the wings had an extreme stagger—the upper wing was well forward of the fuselage while the middle set was centrally located and the bottom set nearly under the tail section. Initial power plant was a 60 hp Anzani, but this was later upgraded to an 80 hp Gnome-Rhone. First flight was on 2 October 1914 at the hands of Bezobrazov's assistant, F. E. Moska, and the aircraft was flown later in Sevastopol, but it was never put into production.
