= Russian ironclad Kniaz Pozharsky =

Imperial Russian Navy's iron-hulled armored frigate

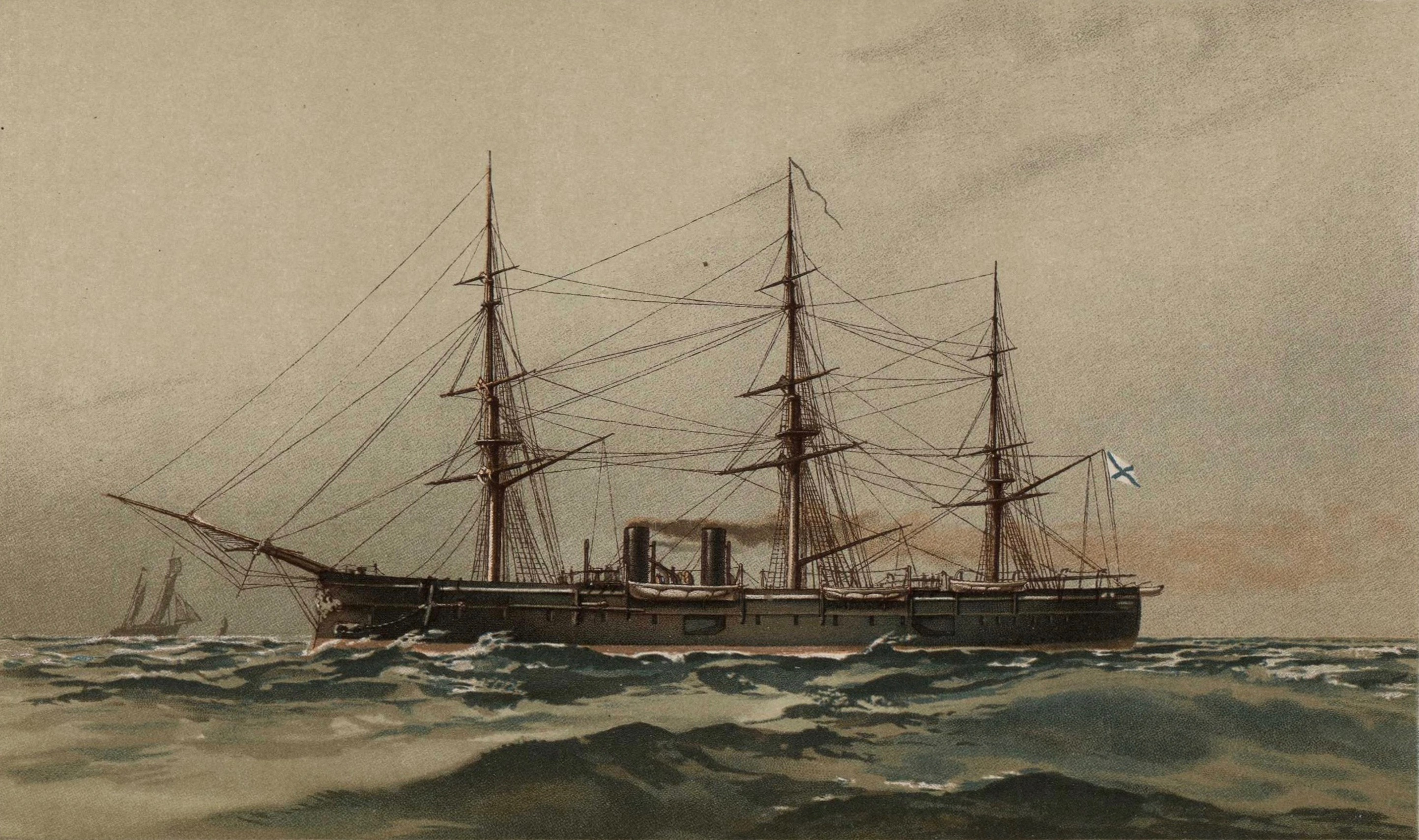
- Kniaz Pozharsky as depicted by an 1893 lithograph

Class overview
- Operators: Imperial Russian Navy
- Preceded by: Pervenets class
- Succeeded by: None
- Built: 1864–73
- In commission: 1873–1909
- Completed: 1
- Scrapped: 1

History

Russian Empire
- Name: Kniaz Pozharsky (Russian: Князь Пожарский)
- Namesake: Dmitry Pozharsky
- Operator: Imperial Russian Navy
- Builder: Charles Mitchell Shipyard, St. Petersburg
- Laid down: 30 November 1864 (Note: All dates used in this article are New Style)
- Launched: 12 September 1867
- Completed: 1870
- Renamed: Blokshiv Nr. 1, 27 October 1909
- Stricken: 14 April 1911
- Fate: Scrapped 1911?

General characteristics
- Type: Central battery ironclad
- Displacement: 5,138 long tons (5,220 t)
- Length: 272 ft 8 in (83.1 m)
- Beam: 49 ft (14.9 m)
- Draft: 24 ft 6 in (7.5 m)
- Installed power: 2,835 ihp (2,114 kW)
- Propulsion: 1 shaft, 1 Horizontal direct-action steam engine; 8 cylindrical boilers
- Speed: 11 knots (20 km/h; 13 mph)
- Range: 3,000 nautical miles (5,600 km; 3,500 mi)
- Complement: 495 officers and crewmen
- Armament: 8 × 1 - 9-inch (229 mm)/22 guns
- Armor: Belt: 4.5 in (114 mm); Battery: 4.5 in (114 mm)

The Russian ironclad Kniaz Pozharsky (Russian: Князь Пожарский) was an iron-hulled armored frigate built for the Imperial Russian Navy during the 1860s. She was the first Russian armored ship to leave European waters when she cruised the Pacific Ocean in 1873–75. The ship did not participate in the Russo-Turkish War of 1877–78, and remained in the Baltic Sea until 1879–80, when she made another cruise to the Pacific. Kniaz Pozharsky was assigned to the Baltic Fleet for the rest of her career. She mainly served as a training ship after her refit in 1885 until she was hulked in 1909 and probably scrapped in 1911.

== Design and description ==
Originally classified as an armored corvette, Kniaz Pozharsky was redesignated as an armored frigate on 20 November 1866. She was laid out as a central battery ironclad with the armament concentrated amidships. The ship was fitted with a ram and her crew numbered approximately 495 officers and enlisted men.

Kniaz Pozharsky was 272 feet 8 inches (83.1 m) long at the waterline. She had a beam of 49 feet (14.9 m) and a draft of 24 feet 6 inches (7.5 m). The ship was designed to displace 4,506 long tons (4,578 t), but displaced 5,138 long tons (5,220 t) as built, an increase of over 600 long tons (610 t). Kniaz Pozharsky was fitted with a double bottom and was considered to be a steady gun platform and a good sea boat.

=== Propulsion ===
The ship had a simple horizontal direct-acting steam engine driving a single two-bladed propeller. Steam was provided by eight cylindrical boilers. The engine produced 2,835 indicated horsepower (2,114 kW) during sea trials which gave the ship a maximum speed around 11.7 knots (21.7 km/h; 13.5 mph). Kniaz Pozharsky carried a maximum of 600 long tons (610 t) of coal which gave her an economical range of 3,000 nautical miles (5,600 km; 3,500 mi). She was ship-rigged with three masts and a maximum sail area of 27,000 square feet (2,508 m^{2}). To reduce drag while under sail her funnel was retractable and her propeller could be hoisted into the hull.

=== Armament ===
Kniaz Pozharsky was armed with eight Obukhov 9-inch (229 mm) breech-loading guns. In an attempt to provide axial fire, the sides of the hull at the upper deck level were cut away in front of and behind the battery. While providing better coverage than the traditional broadside layout, this still left a considerable area on which no gun could bear.

The solid shot of the 20-caliber gun weighed approximately 300 pounds (136 kg), while the gun itself weighed 14,908 pounds (6,762 kg). The gun had a muzzle velocity of 1,276 ft/s (389 m/s) and was credited with the nominal ability to penetrate 9.3 inches (236 mm) of wrought iron armor at the muzzle.

Watts and Gardiner credit the ship with three spar torpedoes as well as three towed torpedoes, but these are not mentioned by Wright or Silverstone.

=== Armour ===
Figures for Kniaz Pozharsky's armor protection vary between sources. They agree that she had a complete waterline belt of wrought iron that had a total height of 11 feet (3 m) with 5 feet (1.5 m) below the waterline. Thicknesses for the belt are quoted from 100 to 114 millimeters (3.9 to 4.5 in) thick. The guns were protected by a section of 114-millimeter armor, 80 feet (24.4 m) long; no information on any armored transverse bulkheads is available. The armor was backed by 17 or 18 inches (432 or 457 mm) of teak.

== Service ==
Kniaz Pozharsky was laid down on 30 November 1864 at the Mitchell Shipyard in Saint Petersburg with the name of Pozharsky, but it was changed before she was launched on 12 September 1867. Sources differ on when the ship entered service; they give either 1870 or 1873. About 1873 Kniaz Pozharsky became the first Russian armored ship to deploy to the Pacific, but returned to the Baltic Fleet in 1875. She remained in the Baltic Sea during the Russo-Turkish War and the ensuing war scare with Great Britain. The ship made another cruise to the Pacific in 1879–80. Kniaz Pozharsky served as the flagship during the fleet maneuvers of 1884 and she was reviewed by Tsar Alexander III of Russia. The ship was extensively refitted the following year and received new boilers, her propeller was fixed in place and her retractable funnel was replaced by two fixed funnels.

Kniaz Pozharsky was rearmed during the refit, but sources differ on the light guns fitted. Her 9-inch guns were replaced by new, more powerful 35-caliber 8-inch (203 mm) guns, likely the 12.74 long tons (12.94 t) model with a muzzle velocity of 1,796 ft/s (547 m/s). Two 6-inch (152 mm), 23-caliber guns were also fitted, possibly as chase guns. Wright and Watts agree that eight 4-pounder guns and four quick-firing guns of unspecified size were added; Silverstone does not mention the four quick-firers, but Gardiner says that four 83.4-millimeter (3.3 in) guns were fitted. The ship was reclassified as a "cruiser of the 1st rank" in 1892 and her light armament was modified by the substitution of four 47-millimeter (1.9 in) Hotchkiss guns for four of the 4-pounders and the addition of six 37-millimeter (1.5 in) Hotchkiss guns. Two above-water 15-inch (381 mm) torpedo tubes were also added at this time.

After her refit, Kniaz Pozharsky served mostly as a training ship with the Naval School Division, although she was not formally reclassified as a school ship until 24 March 1906. After she was reclassified her armament was reduced to a single 6-inch gun, four 4-pounders, two 47-millimeter and six 37-millimeter Hotchkiss guns. The ship was hulked on 27 October 1909 and renamed Blokshiv No. 1. She was struck from the Navy List on 14 April 1911 and probably scrapped shortly afterward because the elderly monitor Lava was renamed as Blokshiv No. 1 that same day.
