= Aleksandr Bezobrazov (businessman) =

Russian politician (1853–1931)

Aleksandr Mikhailovich Bezobrazov
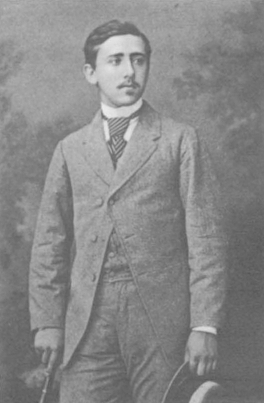
- Born: 13 September 1855; Tambov, Russian Empire
- Died: 9 October 1931 (aged 76); Paris, France

Aleksandr Mikhailovich Bezobrazov (Russian: Александр Михайлович Безобразов (1855-1931) was a businessman and political adventurer from the Russian Empire who exerted a major influence on the foreign policies of the Russian Empire in the years prior to the Russo-Japanese War.

== Early life ==
Aleksandr Mikhailovich was born into an old Russian Bezobrazov noble family, as the eldest son of Mikhail Alexandrovich Bezobrazov (1815-1879) and his wife, Countess Olga von Nostitz-Jänkendorf (1828-1894).

== Career ==
He joined the Imperial Russian Army, attaining the rank of captain in the Horse Guards. After the assassination of Tsar Alexander II in 1881, he became a member of a secret counter-revolutionary organization known as the “Holy Militia”.

In 1896, Bezobrazov submitted a petition to the throne, in which he predicted the inevitability of war with the Empire of Japan and urging an aggressive policy against Japan in Korea and Manchuria. His proposal involved the establishment of a commercial enterprise reminiscent of the British East India Company, which would provide the government with tangible financial benefits while setting the stage for the peaceful conquest of the region. Although the proposal met with sympathy at Court, Bezobrazov was initially thwarted by Finance Minister Sergei Witte, who suspected Bezobrazov’s political intentions.

However, in 1896, King Kojong of Korea was persuaded by Jules Briner, a Russian merchant based in Vladivostok, to grant a timber concession along the Yalu River border between Korea and Manchuria. Briner offered to sell the concession to the Russian government in 1897. In 1898, Bezobrazov was introduced in person to Tsar Nicholas II by Grand Duke Aleksandr Mikhailovich Romanov, along with Bezobrazov’s cousin, Rear Admiral Alexey Abaza. This formed the core of what was later called the “Bezobrazov Circle”, along with Mikhail Rodzianko, Admiral Yevgeni Ivanovich Alekseyev, and others. Bezobrazov convinced Tsar Nicholas II of his plans, and the imperial cabinet approved the purchase over Witte’s objections in May 1898. To avoid complications with foreign powers, the concession was chartered as a private company in July 1901, and it was suggested that shares might be offered to Germany and France (although not to Japan or Great Britain). In the interim, the Boxer Rebellion had resulted in a tremendous increase in Russian military influence in the area, and Russia was able to obtain similar concessions from China on the Manchurian side of the Yalu River.

After the signing of the Anglo-Japanese Alliance, Tsar Nicholas dispatched Bezobrazov to the region in person, where he alarmed Admiral Alekseyev with talk of war with Japan, and the need to stop the withdrawal of Russian troops from Manchuria. In 1902, with Witte out of favor at court, Bezobrazov was given almost unlimited access to state funds and was allowed to set up a private company called the Yalu River Timber Concessions. Although the company ostensibly was private, Bezobrazov was appointed a state secretary. Russian army units, dressed as civilians, established several military strongholds along the Yalu River, including some on the Korean side of the river. Bezobrazov also armed local Honghuzi bandits to drive out Chinese settlers in the region.

From May 1903, Bezobrazov’s influence continued to increase, as the Tsar, after appointing Alekseyev as viceroy of the Far East, instructed him to discuss economic policy with Bezobrazov rather than Witte. Bezobrazov also returned to Manchuria to organize the Russian Timber Producing Association of the Far East. This Association was merged with Witte’s Manchurian Mining Association in August 1903. However, the actual outbreak of conflict between Japan and Russia in February 1904 caused the collapse of Bezobrazov’s enterprises, which were already financially overextended. He fled his creditors to Switzerland, but returned to Russia in late 1904. He left Russia again after the October Revolution and died in exile in Paris in 1931.
