= Russian cruiser Asia =

Warship

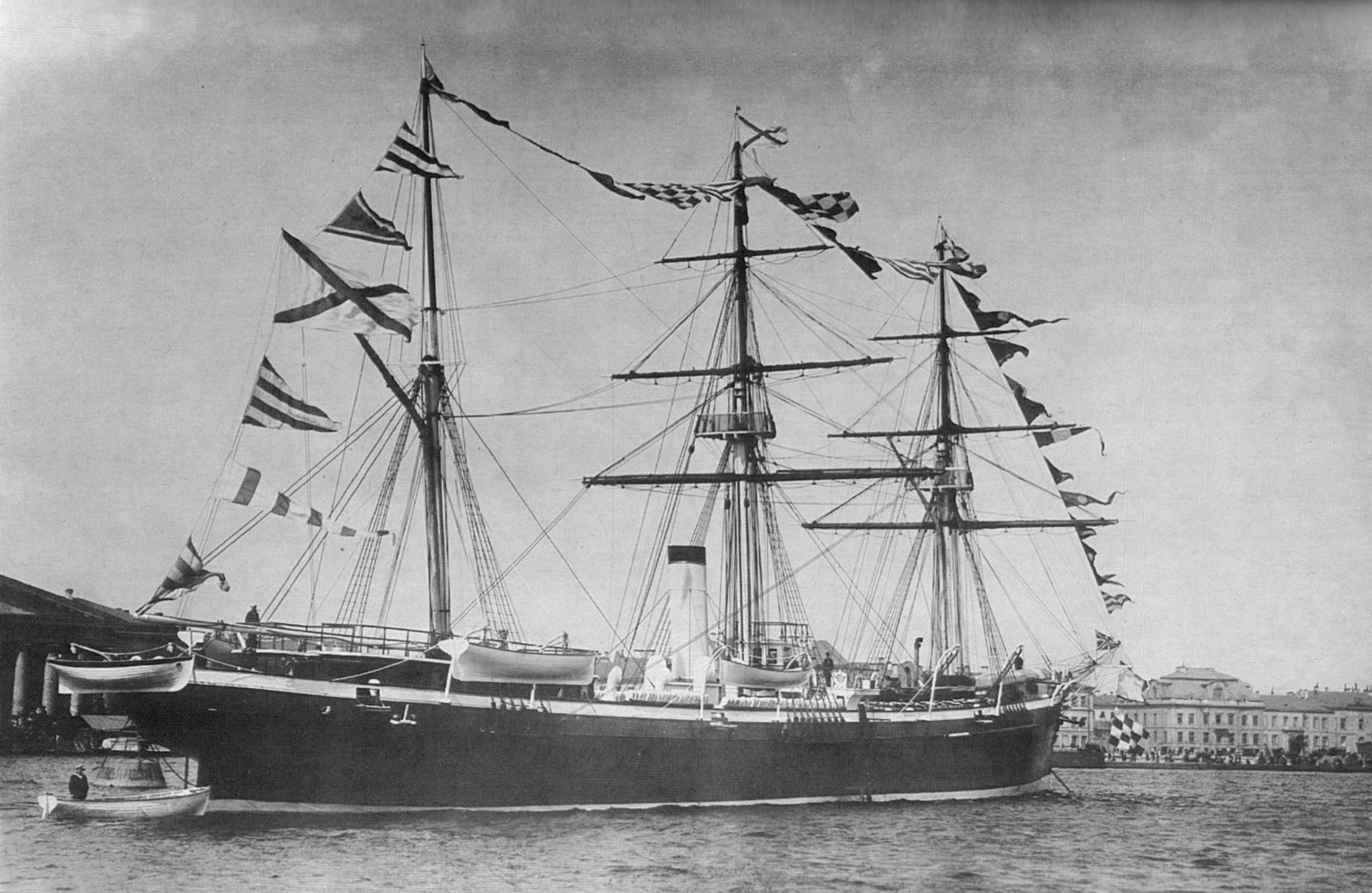

History

United States
- Name: Columbus
- Owner: William P. Clyde & Co, Philadelphia
- Port of registry: Philadelphia
- Builder: William Cramp & Sons, Philadelphia
- Yard number: 184
- Laid down: 1873
- Launched: 18 September 1873
- Completed: 1874
- Maiden voyage: 10 February 1874
- Home port: New York
- Fate: Sold to Russia, May 1878

Russian Empire
- Name: Asia; Kavkaz (1912-1914)
- Builder: William Cramp & Sons, Philadelphia
- Yard number: 204 (for conversion)
- Acquired: Purchased May 1878
- Reclassified: Cruiser 2nd Class, 1 February 1892
- Stricken: May 1918
- Fate: Scrapped in Germany, 1923

General characteristics
- Type: Cruiser
- Displacement: 2,449 long tons (2,488 t)
- Length: 82.3 m (270 ft 0 in)
- Beam: 10.7 m (35 ft 1 in)
- Draught: 4.8 m (15 ft 9 in)
- Propulsion: Steam engine, 1,200 hp (890 kW); After 1898 : Steam engine, 2,700 hp (2,000 kW)
- Speed: 12.5 knots (23.2 km/h; 14.4 mph); After 1898 : 15.7 knots (29.1 km/h; 18.1 mph)
- Range: 9,600 nmi (17,800 km)
- Complement: 11 officers and 207 men
- Armament: 3 × 152 mm (6 in) guns; 5 × 107 mm (4.2 in) 9-pounder guns; 4 × 25 mm (1 in) guns; 2 × 445 mm (17.5 in) torpedo tubes

Asia (Russian: А́зия) was a cruiser of the Imperial Russian Navy. The ship was originally the Philadelphia-built iron merchant steamship Columbus completed in 1874

The iron passenger-cargo steamship Columbus was built 1873/74 in Philadelphia by William Cramp & Sons as Yard No.184 for local shipowner William P Clyde & Co.

Columbus was bought by Russia in May 1878, one of three merchant ships purchased in the United States to be transformed into naval cruisers: State of California became Europa, Saratoga became Afrika, and Columbus became Asia. After initial conversion by her builders, Cramp, in Philadelphia, she was sailed to Russia by a Russian crew for further outfitting in Kronstadt during 1878 and 1879.

The cruiser saw initial duty in the Far East, but then returned to the Baltic. She was downgraded to Cruiser 2nd Class on 1 February 1892. The future Vice Admiral Karl Jessen was her commanding officer in 1895 and 1896. In 1898 she received a new engine, increasing her power from 1,200 hp (890 kW) to 2,700 hp (2,000 kW), and adding 2.2 knots (4 km/h; 3 mph) to her top speed.

In August 1911, now rather obsolete, Asia was transferred to the reserve fleet. In October 1912 she was renamed Kaukas (Russian: "Кавказ"). Following the outbreak of the First World War, she was once again renamed Asia on 11 September 1914, assigned to the Baltic Fleet's transport squadron and used as a minelayer.

The ship was deactivated in May 1918 and scrapped in 1923.
