= Yulian Bialozor =

Russian general (1862–1942)

Yulian Yulianovich Bialozor (Belozor)
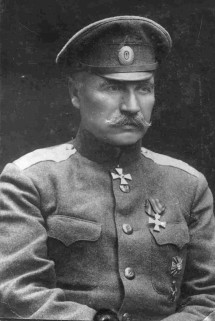
- Born: 10 January 1862; Sventsyany uezd, Vilna Governorate, Russian Empire
- Died: 13 April 1942 (aged 80); Vilnius, Lithuania
- Military career
- Allegiance: Russian Empire
- Branch: Imperial Russian Army
- Service years: 1881–1918
- Rank: Lieutenant General
- Conflicts: Boxer Rebellion; Russo-Japanese War; World War I

Yulian Yulianovich Bialozor (Belozor) (Russian: Юлиан Юлианович Бялозор (Белозор); 10 January 1862 – 13 April 1942), was an Imperial Russian Army lieutenant general who served in the Boxer Rebellion, Russo-Japanese War, and World War I.

== Biography ==
Bialozor descended from the hereditary nobles of the Vilna Governorate of the Wieniawa coat of arms; the family has been known since the end of the 15th century.

=== Education ===
Bialozor studied at the Vilna Real School. In 1878, he entered the Vilna Infantry Junker School. In 1881, he graduated from the college in the 2nd category and was commissioned as a lieutenant officer.

=== Service ===
Bialozor began his military career as an ensign on 9 January 1882. He was promoted to second lieutenant of the 64th Kazan Infantry Regiment on 1 September 1884, followed by a promotion to lieutenant on 25 October 1888 and to staff captain on 11 December 1889. In 1890, he transferred to the Amur region, where he served in various units including the 6th and 10th East Siberian linear battalions, 8th and 9th East Siberian rifle battalions, and the 5th and 22nd East Siberian rifle regiments. Achieving the rank of captain on 15 July 1893, Bialozor was promoted to lieutenant colonel on 26 February 1901. During the battle of Jingzhou on 13 May 1904, he commanded the center comprising the 12th, 3rd, 8th, and 4th companies of the 5th East Siberian Rifle Regiment. Bialozor sustained severe injuries, including shell shock, wounds to the head, left hand from a shell fragment, and a rifle bullet through the left leg, rendering him unconscious on the battlefield and subsequently captured by the Japanese. In December 1905, Bialozor was released from captivity. On 3 May 1907, he was transferred to the 76th Kuban Infantry Regiment, and on 26 February 1908, he was promoted to colonel for his military distinction. During 1907, he served as a defense witness in the Supreme Military Criminal Court in the case involving the resignations of Anatoly Stessel, Alexander Fok, Konstantin Smirnov, and Viktor Reis. On 7 June 1909, he became commander of the 263rd (later the 207th from 30 August 1909) Novobayazet Infantry Regiment of the 52nd Division in the III Caucasian Army Corps at Temir-Khan-Shura. Subsequently, on 23 June 1912, he assumed command of the 10th Siberian Rifle Regiment, and on 26 September 1912, he took over command. Promoted to major general on 22 February 1913, with a special assignment under the commander of the troops of the Amur Military District and enlistment in the army infantry, he continued his career. On 17 October 1914, he served as Chief of the sanitary department at the 9th Army headquarters. He later became brigade chief of the 3rd Grenadier Division on 13 February 1915, and subsequently Chief of the 2nd Infantry Brigade from 26 February 1915 (later of the division from 28 March 1915). Promoted to lieutenant general on 6 December 1915, for his military achievements and confirmed as head of the division, he continued to excel. In September 1917, he was appointed commander of the 9th Army on the Romanian Front, followed by his participation from December 1917 to February 1918 in forming the 2nd volunteer brigade near Chisinau, consisting of about 800 personnel. In February 1918, he disbanded the volunteer brigade, and in March 1918, he declined to lead a detachment of officers gathered by Mikhail Drozdovsky in Chisinau for a march to join the Volunteer Army. In 1920, he settled in Vilna in his own house on the Menagerie.

He is buried at the Antakalnis Cemetery.

== Awards ==
- Order of St. Stanislaus, 3rd Class, 25 May 1893; 2nd Class with Swords, 27 January 1901; 1st Class, 12 June 1913
- Order of St. Anne, 3rd Class, 28 December 1897; 2nd Class with Swords, 15 June 1901; 1st Class, 13 May 1915
- Golden Weapon for Bravery, 30 January 1906 – "for the battle at the Tsinajou position near Port Arthur on 13 May 1904"
- Order of St. Vladimir, 4th Class, 3 December 1908 – "for 25 years of blameless service in officer ranks"; 3rd Class, 25 February 1911; 2nd Class with swords, 13 October 1915
- Order of St. George, 4th Class, 11 January 1915 – "for distinction in the battle with the Austrians on 20 October 1915"; 3rd Class, 7 October 1916

Foreign

- Order of the Double Dragon, 3rd Class, 2nd Class (Qing dynasty)
- Order of the Crown, 3rd Class (Prussia)
- Order of the Red Eagle, 3rd Class (Prussia)
- Military Order of the Dragon (United States)

Medals

- in memory of the reign of Alexander III
- in memory of military events in China 1900–1901.
- with a bow for the Russo-Japanese War of 1904–1905.
- in memory of the 300th anniversary of the House of Romanov
- for his labors in the excellent execution of the general mobilization of 1914.
- Breastplate in memory of the 50th anniversary of the conquest of the Eastern Caucasus.
