= Tsukamoto Katsuyoshi =

Japanese lieutenant general (1847–1912)

Baron Tsukamoto Katsuyoshi
- 塚本勝嘉
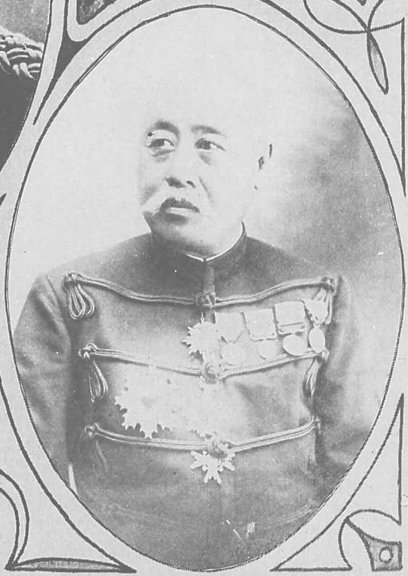
- Born: 27 December 1847; Ogaki, Gifu, Japan
- Died: 15 January 1912 (aged 64)
- Military career
- Allegiance: Empire of Japan
- Branch: Imperial Japanese Army
- Service years: 1872–1908
- Rank: Lieutenant General
- Commands: IJA 4th Division, IJA 9th Division
- Conflicts: Boshin War; Taiwan Expedition; Satsuma Rebellion; Boxer Rebellion; First Sino-Japanese War; Russo-Japanese War

Baron Tsukamoto Katsuyoshi (塚本勝嘉, Katsuyoshi Tsukamoto; 27 December 1847 – 15 January 1912) was a lieutenant general in the early Imperial Japanese Army.

== Biography ==
Tsukamoto was born as the third son to a samurai named Inomichi Juzaemon of the Ogaki Domain (present day Gifu prefecture), and was adopted into the Tsukamoto family as a child. As a young samurai, he commanded a squad dispatched by the domain during the suppression of the anti-Shogunate forces in the Second Chōshū expedition; however, he later fought for the pro-imperial Satchō Alliance when the domain changed its alliance in the Boshin War. In 1872 he was commissioned as a second lieutenant in the fledgling Imperial Japanese Army. He was commander of the 6th Battalion during the 1874 Taiwan Expedition. Afterwards, he was stationed at the Kumamoto Garrison, and participated in suppression of the Satsuma Rebellion from February to October 1877.

During the First Sino-Japanese War Tsukamoto was commander of the IJA 6th Infantry Regiment, and served with distinction at the Battle of Pyongyang. After the war, he served as commandant of the Army Staff College and Chief of Staff of the IJA 6th Infantry Division. In September 1897, he was promoted to major general.

Tsukamoto commanded the IJA 21st Infantry Brigade during the Boxer Rebellion and early in the Russo-Japanese War, including the Battle of Nanshan. In September 1904, he was promoted to lieutenant general. He succeeded General Ogawa Mataji as commander of the IJA 4th Infantry Division after the latter was wounded in combat during the Battle of Liaoyang. He continued to command the division through the Battle of Mukden. After the end of the war, he was reassigned to command the IJA 9th Infantry Division.

In September 1907, Tsukamoto was ennobled with the title of baron (danshaku) under the kazoku peerage system. He left active service in December 1908, and died in 1912. He was posthumously given the honorary title of Junior Second Court Rank

== Decorations ==
- 1893 - Order of the Sacred Treasure, 3rd class
- 1895 - Order of the Rising Sun, 3rd class
- 1895 - Order of the Golden Kite, 4th class
- 1905 - Grand Cordon of the Order of the Sacred Treasure
- 1906 - Grand Cordon of the Order of the Rising Sun
- 1906 - Order of the Golden Kite, 2nd class

=== Foreign ===
- 1901 - Netherlands - Order of Orange-Nassau, Grand Officer
