= Roman Kondratenko =

Russian military commander (1857–1904)

Roman Isidorovich Kondratenko
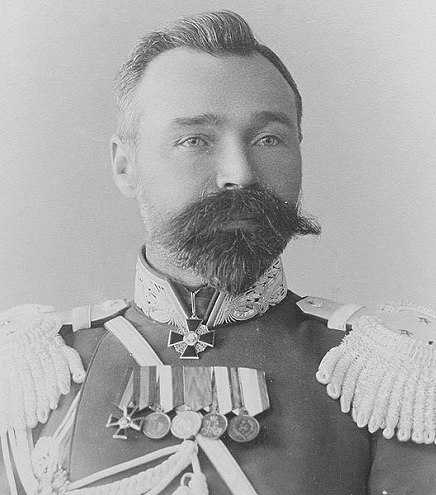
- Born: October 12, 1857; Tiflis, Caucasus Viceroyalty, Russian Empire
- Died: December 15, 1904 (aged 47); Port Arthur, Manchuria
- Military career
- Allegiance: Russia
- Branch: Imperial Russian Army
- Service years: 1877–1904
- Rank: Lieutenant General
- Commands: 7th East Siberian Rifle Division
- Conflicts: Russo Japanese War; Siege of Port Arthur †

Roman Isidorovich Kondratenko (Russian: Роман Исидорович Кондратенко; October 12, 1857 – December 15, 1904) was a Russian general in the Imperial Russian Army remembered for his role in the Siege of Port Arthur during the Russo-Japanese War of 1904–1905.

== Biography ==
Roman Kondratenko was born in Tiflis, (now the capital of Georgia) as the tenth child to a retired Army major of Ukrainian origin. He was sent to study at the Polotsk Cadet Corps in Polotsk (located in what is now Belarus) with the assistance of an elder brother, and obtained a scholarship to study at public expense. Graduating with honors in 1877, he was able enter the Nikolaev Engineering Institute, now Military engineering-technical university. He got a praporshchik and was assigned to the 1st Caucasian sapper battalion. Kondratenko was admitted into the Military Engineering Academy in 1879, and in 1884 he became an attendee of the General Staff Academy. After serving some time on the engineering department (1882–1894), he received command of a regiment in 1895 and was promoted to major general in 1901 and served as chief of staff of the Amur Military District. In 1903, Kondratenko received command of the 7th East Siberian Rifle Brigade, based at Port Arthur. The brigade was expanded into the 7th East Siberian Rifle Division, and Kondratenko was promoted to lieutenant general.

=== Russo-Japanese War ===
After Kondratenko's arrival at Port Arthur in 1903, he reorganized and improved on its already massive fortifications over a period of several months, anticipating the coming conflict with the Empire of Japan. After the start of the Siege of Port Arthur, he was the soul of the Russian defenses, personally directing efforts of the defending troops in the most difficult and dangerous areas, and overseeing repairs of the fortifications due to battle damage. Kondratenko successfully repulsed four Japanese assaults, making skillful use of both army and Imperial Russian Navy forces, and effectively functioned as third in command of Port Arthur, after General Anatoly Stoessel and Lieutenant General Konstantin Smirnov.

However, on December 2, 1904, he was mortally wounded when the armory of the fort he was defending took a direct hit from Japanese howitzer fire. Only eighteen days after his death, generals Stoessel and Alexander Fok surrendered Port Arthur to the Japanese.

After the war, the body of General Kondratenko was transported to St. Peterburg and buried in Alexander Nevsky Lavra. In the memory of Kondratenko's courage, the Japanese erected a granite cenotaph on the spot of his death.

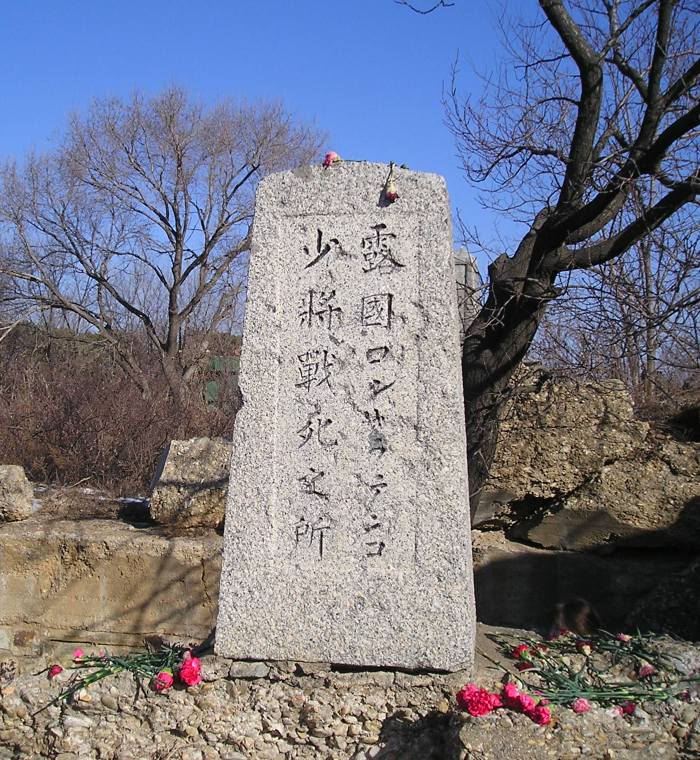
General Kondratenko's cenotaph, erected by the Japanese at the site of his death

== Honors ==
- Order of St. Stanislaus 3rd class, 1884
- Order of St. Anne 3rd class, 1889
- Order of St. Stanislaus 2nd class, 1892
- Order of St. Anne 2nd class, 1892
- Order of St Vladimir 4th class, 1899
- Order of St. George, 4th class
- Order of St. George, 3rd class

The Okhotnik-class destroyer General Kondratenko was named after him.

== Sources ==
- "Кондратенко, Роман Исидорович" . Brockhaus and Efron Encyclopedic Dictionary (in Russian). 1906.
- Connaughton, R.M (1988). The War of the Rising Sun and the Tumbling Bear—A Military History of the Russo-Japanese War 1904–5, London, ISBN 0-415-00906-5.
- Jukes, Geoffry. The Russo-Japanese War 1904–1905. Osprey Essential Histories. (2002). ISBN 978-1-84176-446-7.
- Kowner, Rotem (2006). Historical Dictionary of the Russo-Japanese War. The Scarecrow Press. ISBN 0-8108-4927-5.
- Warner, Denis & Peggy. The Tide at Sunrise, A History of the Russo-Japanese War 1904–1905. (1975). ISBN 0-7146-5256-3.
