= Tretyakov =

Tretyakov, Tretiakov (Russian: Третьяков) (masculine) or Tretyakova (Russian: Третьякова) (feminine) is a common Russian surname which means literally '[son] of the third child (son) in family'. Notable people with the surname include:

- Aleksandr Tretyakov (skeleton racer) (born 1985), Russian skeleton racer
- Nikolai Tretyakov (1854–1917), Russian general
- Pavel Tretyakov (1832–1898), Russian businessman and art collector
- Sergei Tretyakov (arts patron) died 1892, Russian art collector and patron, brother of Pavel
- Sergei Tretyakov (writer) (1892–1937), Russian writer
- Sergei Tretyakov (intelligence officer) (1956–2010), Russian spy and defector
- Sergei Tretyakov (scientist), Russian-Finnish electrical engineer
- Viktor Tretyakov (born 1946), Russian violinist and conductor
- Valery Tretyakov (disambiguation), several people

== See also ==
- Tretyakov Gallery, art gallery in Moscow
- Tretyakovsky Proyezd, street in Moscow
