= Mitrofan Nadein =

Russian lieutenant general

Mitrofan Aleksandrovich Nadein
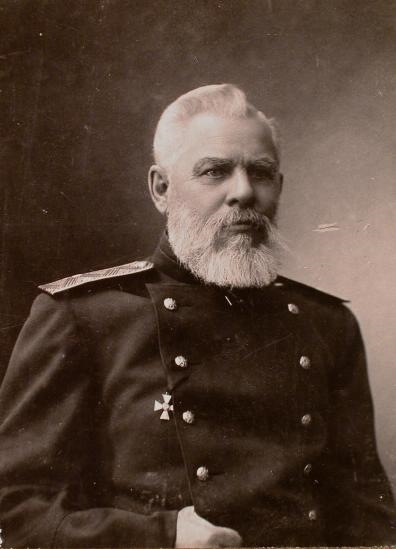
- Major-General Mitrofan Nadein, commander of the 2nd Brigade of the 4th Siberian Rifle Division, chief of the Sanchagou Detachment
- Native name: Митрофанъ Александровичъ Надеинъ (Note: Pre-1918 Russian orthography)
- Born: 1839
- Died: 1907
- Allegiance: Russia
- Branch: Imperial Russian Army
- Rank: Lieutenant general
- Battles: Russo-Turkish War; Battle of Shipka Pass; Russo-Japanese War; Siege of Port Arthur; Battle of Nanshan
- Awards: Order of Saint George; Golden Weapon for Bravery

Mitrofan Aleksandrovich Nadein (Russian: Митрофан Александрович Надеин) was a Russian lieutenant general, a participant in the siege of Port Arthur and the battle of Nanshan (Jinzhou).

== Description ==
He entered the service as a junker in the Podolsk Infantry Regiment (1856), in 1863 was promoted to lieutenant; in 1877–78 Nadein in the ranks of the Podolsk regiment took part in the war with Turkey, was wounded during the defence of Shipka and for his distinction was promoted to major, awarded the Order of St. George, 4th degree, and the Golden Weapon for Bravery; in 1894 he was promoted to colonel and appointed commander of the 228th Infantry Reserve Khvalynsky Battalion, in 1904 he was promoted to major general and appointed commander of the 2nd Brigade of the 4th Siberian Rifle Division, with which he joined the garrison of Port Arthur and took part in its defence. On May 16, (Note: New Style dates) 1904, at the village of Shisaliteza Nadein was wounded in the arm and contused in the head, and on May 26 he directly ordered the defence of the Jinzhou position. For leading the defence of the fortress' eastern front during the repulsion of Japanese assaults in October and November 1904 Nadein was awarded the Order of St. George, 3rd degree, and at the end of the fortress' defence for distinction — the rank of lieutenant general.

== Sources ==
- Velichko, Konstantin; Novitsky, Vasily; Schwarz, Aleksey von; Apushkin, Vladimir; Schulz, Gustav von (1914). Военная энциклопедия Сытина [Sytin Military Encyclopedia]. Vol. 16: Минный – Нисса. Moscow: Типография Т-ва И. Д. Сытина. p. 519.
