= Tsukamoto =

- Pronunciation: Tsuka-moto
- Language: Japanese

Origin
- Origin: (Japan) Japanese
- Region of origin: Japan

Tsukamoto (written: 塚本 or 柄本) is a Japanese surname.

Notable people with the surname include:

- Akimasa Tsukamoto (塚本 明正; born 1969), Japanese footballer
- Ann Tsukamoto (born 1952), American scientist
- Hidehiko Tsukamoto (塚本 秀彦; born 1978), Japanese boxer
- Hideki Tsukamoto (塚本 秀樹; born 1973), Japanese footballer
- Tsukamoto Katsuyoshi (塚本 勝嘉; 1847–1912), Japanese general
- Koichi Tsukamoto (塚本 幸一; 1920–1998), Japanese businessman
- Koju Tsukamoto (塚本 公樹; 1942–2004), Japanese rower
- Mary Tsukamoto (1915–1998), Japanese-American educator, cultural historian, and civil rights activist
- Nami Tsukamoto (柄本 奈美; born 1979), Japanese ballet dancer
- Shinya Tsukamoto (塚本 晋也; born 1960), Japanese film director and actor
- Taishi Tsukamoto (塚本 泰史; born 1985), Japanese footballer
- Takashi Tsukamoto (塚本 高史; born 1982), Japanese actor, singer and model

== Fictional characters ==
- Chisa Tsukamoto (塚本 千紗), a character in the visual novel Comic Party
- Shuichi Tsukamoto (塚本 秀一), a character in the novel series Sound! Euphonium
- Tenma Tsukamoto (塚本 天満), a character in the manga series School Rumble
- Tsukushi Tsukamoto (柄本 つくし), protagonist of the manga series Days
- Yakumo Tsukamoto (塚本 八雲), a character in the manga series School Rumble
- Yoshiro Tsukamoto (塚本よしひろ), a character in the mystery novel Honeymoon to Nowhere by Akimitsu Takagi

== See also ==
- 9256 Tsukamoto, a main-belt asteroid
- Tsukamoto Station, a railway station in Osaka, Osaka Prefecture, Japan
