= 4th Division (Imperial Japanese Army) =

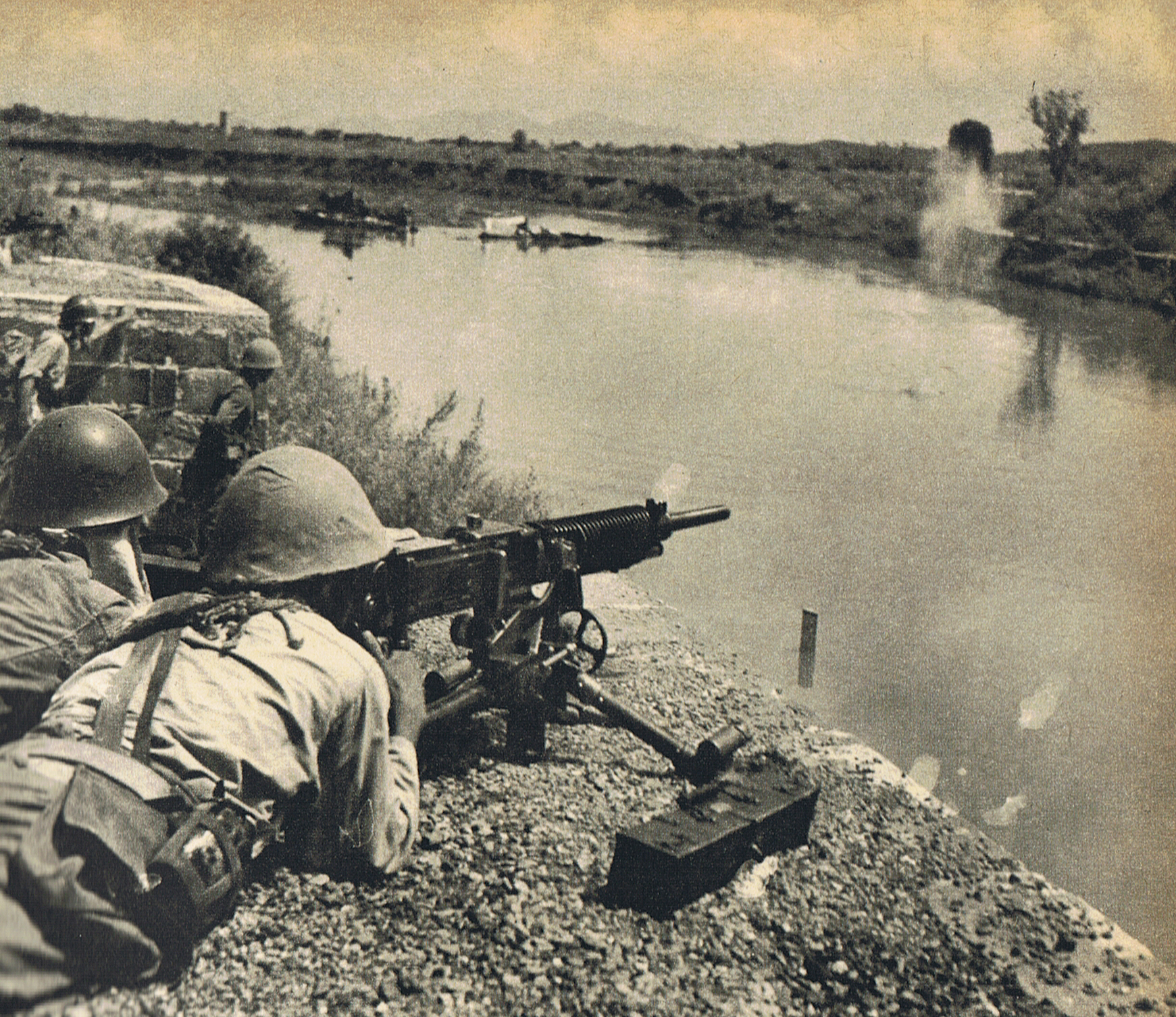
- A soldier of the IJA 4th Division firing type 92 heavy machine gun during the Battle of Changsha. Near Miluo river, Hunan Province, China.
- Active: 1888 - 1945
- Disbanded: 1945
- Country: Empire of Japan
- Branch: Imperial Japanese Army
- Type: Infantry
- Size: Division
- Garrison/HQ: Osaka City, Japan
- Nickname: Yodo Division
- Engagements: First Sino-Japanese War; Russo-Japanese War; Siberian Intervention; Shandong Incident; World War II

Commanders
- Notable commanders: Takashima Tomonosuke; Prince Kitashirakawa Yoshihisa; Ichinohe Hyoe; Abe Nobuyuki; Terauchi Hisaichi; Prince Higashikuni Naruhiko; Tomoyuki Yamashita.

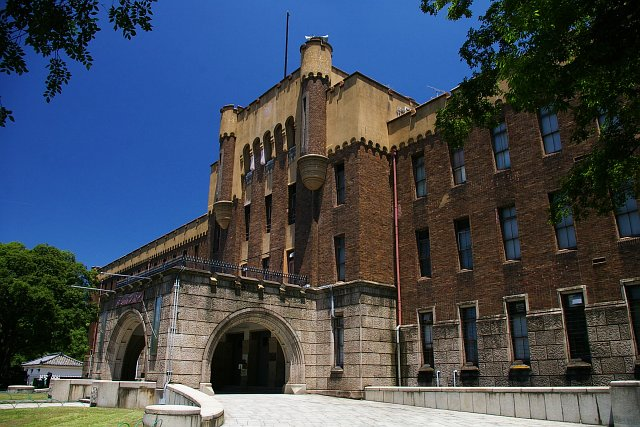
HQ of the 4th Division in Osaka, Japan.

The 4th Division (第4師団, Daishi shidan) was an infantry division in the Imperial Japanese Army. Its call-sign was Yodo Division (淀兵団, Yodo-heidan), which came from the Yodo River.

== History ==
The 4th Division was formed in Osaka City in January 1871 as the Osaka Garrison (大阪鎮台, Osaka chindai), one of six regional commands created in the fledgling Imperial Japanese Army. The Osaka Garrison had responsibility for the central region of Honshū (Kansai district), ranging from Shiga Prefecture to Hyōgo Prefecture. The six regional commands were transformed into divisions under the army reorganization of 14 May 1888.

=== Early action ===
The 4th regional command played a vital role in the defeat of the Satsuma Rebellion in 1877.

During the First Sino-Japanese War in 1895, the 4th division landed on Liaodong Peninsula and performed security duties as part of army reserve, though its 7th Mixed Brigade was sent to northern Formosa in September 1895 during the Japanese invasion of Taiwan, and helped to pacify the Kapsulan (Yilan) district.

During the Russo-Japanese War, the division, led by Lieutenant General Ogawa Mataji, participated in the Battle of Nanshan, Battle of Liaoyang (where the commander was wounded and replaced by Lieutenant General Tsukamoto Katsuyoshi), Battle of Shaho and Battle of Mukden.

The division later served in the Siberian Intervention and the Jinan Incident (1928).

=== Action in Second Sino-Japanese War and Pacific War ===
On 10 February 1937, the 4th Division came under the command of the Kwantung Army in Manchuria. Actually departing Osaka 6 September 1937, and landing in Daegu 12 September 1937. It participated in Central Hubei Operation, Battle of South Henan, and Jiangbei operation (attacking from northern Anlu). It was transferred to the 11th Army on 1 July 1940. In September 1941, the division participated in Battle of Changsha (1941). From 11 June 1941, it started reorganization to a triangular division, giving the 70th infantry regiment to the 25th division, eventually transferred to the active reserve force in the Japanese home islands.

In March 1942, the reorganization was complete and the 4th Division was then reassigned to the 14th Army, arriving in the Philippines to participate in the Battle of Bataan on 3 April 1942. The 4th Division also significantly contributed to Japanese efforts in the Battle of Corregidor on 5 May 1942. After the Philippines campaign (1941–1942) ended on 8 May 1942, the division was returned to the home islands to perform security duties.

It came under the control of the 25th Army in September 1943. The 4th Division departed from Moji-ku, Kitakyūshū on 10 October 1943 and performed garrison duties on Padang, Sumatra from early November 1943 to counter potential attacks from the west and to serve as a reserve force for northern Sumatra. Whilst garrisoned in padang, they were also tasked on training local militias under the occupation of West Sumatra known as the Giyuugun (義勇軍, Giyūgun). Parts of the 4th Division were on Chicago Maru transport when it was sunk 15 October 1943, and therefore were temporarily diverted to Kaohsiung, Taiwan. Assigned to the 15th Army on 14 January 1945, its final headquarters was in Lampang, Thailand.

The 4th Division started disbanding in June 1946. The soldiers were repatriated from Bangkok back to the Japanese ports of Uraga and Kagoshima. The last sub-unit, a field hospital, departed Bangkok 4 June 1946 and arrived at Kagoshima 25 June 1946. By 27 June 1946 the dissolution of the 4th Division was complete.

=== Memorial headquarters building ===
The original headquarters for the 4th Division was Osaka Castle. When the castle was reconstructed in 1931, a new headquarters building was erected within the castle grounds a short distance away by donations raised from the citizens of Osaka, so that the castle and its immediate surroundings could be made into a public park. In 1940, the headquarters moved again, this time to Hōkoku Shrine (Osaka) area.

The divisional arsenal in Osaka detonated 14 August 1945 due to Allied bombing, resulting in light damage to the headquarters buildings. As of 2013, the headquarters building remained as a war memorial within the Osaka Castle Park.

Noted commanders in the history of the 4th Division have included Takashima Tomonosuke, Prince Kitashirakawa Yoshihisa, Ichinohe Hyoe, Abe Nobuyuki, Terauchi Hisaichi, Prince Higashikuni Naruhiko and Tomoyuki Yamashita.

== See also ==
- List of Japanese Infantry Divisions

== Reference and further reading ==
- Madej, W. Victor. Japanese Armed Forces Order of Battle, 1937-1945 [2 vols] Allentown, PA: 1981

This article incorporates material from the article 第4師団 (日本軍) in the Japanese Wikipedia, retrieved on 21 January 2016.
