= Alexander Fok =

Russian lieutenant-general (1843–1926)

Alexander Viktorovich Fok
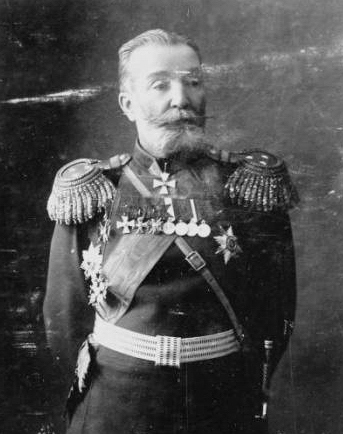
- Alexander Fok
- Born: 6 September 1843
- Died: 2 December 1926 (aged 83) Svishtov, Bulgaria
- Allegiance: Russia; Bulgaria
- Branch: Imperial Russian Army
- Service years: 1864–1906
- Rank: Lieutenant General
- Conflicts: Russo-Turkish War; Boxer Rebellion; Russo Japanese War; Battle of Nanshan; First Balkan War
- Awards: Order of St. George

Alexander Viktorovich Fok (also Foch; Russian: Алекса́ндр Ви́кторович Фок; 6 September 1843 – 2 December 1926) was a Russian lieutenant general of the Imperial Russian Army during the Russo-Japanese War.

== Biography ==
Fok graduated from the Konstantinovskoe Artillery School in St. Petersburg in 1864, and from 1871 to 1876 served in the Special Corps of Gendarmes, an elite uniformed security police force responsible for state security. From 1877 to 1878, he saw combat in the Russo-Turkish War. From 1900, Fok was commander of the 4th East Siberian Rifle Brigade, and participated in the suppression of the Boxer Rebellion.

During the Russo-Japanese War, Fok commanded the 4th East Siberian Rifle Division stationed at Port Arthur. He was noted for his precipitous retreat and failure to reinforce Colonel Nikolai Tretyakov at the Battle of Nanshan, leading directly to the Russian defeat. He was relieved of command on 21 August 1904 for refusing direct orders to send reserves forward to reinforce faltering Russian lines at the fortification of East Panlung and West Panlung during the Siege of Port Arthur. However, he remained on the staff of General Anatoly Stessel, who insisted on naming Fok commander of the landward defenses of Port Arthur and promoting him to lieutenant general after the death of General Roman Kondratenko. Fok was further awarded the Order of St. George (3rd degree) in October 1904. As commander, Fok constantly refused to commit reserves or reinforcements to front-line units, and after eight months of the siege was one of the first to urge acceptance of the surrender terms extended by Japanese general Nogi Maresuke at the end of 1904.

Taken as a prisoner of war by the Japanese after the fall of Port Arthur, Fok returned to Russia after the end of the war. Faced with strong public criticism, he was arrested and brought before a court martial in late 1906 on his return, but was acquitted and released from military service in 1908.

Fok retired from service, but later participated in the Balkan War of 1912–1913 as a volunteer in the Bulgarian Army. He died in 1926 under uncertain circumstances, and according to his wish was buried in a mass grave outside Svishtov in Bulgaria.

== Honors ==
- Order of St. George, 3rd class, 1903
