= Valery Tretyakov =

Valery or Valeri Tretyakov may refer to:

- Valeri Tretyakov (footballer) (born 1945), Russian football coach and player
- Valery Tretyakov (general) (born 1941), Soviet and Russian general
