= Konstantin Smirnov =

Russian military commander

Konstantin Nikolaevich Smirnov
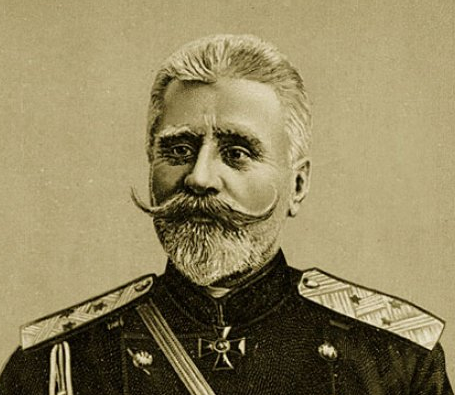
- Chromolithography by D. N. Plushcheev, 1904
- Born: May 19, 1854; Odessa, Russian Empire
- Died: November 9, 1930 (aged 76); Pančevo, Yugoslavia
- Military career
- Allegiance: Russian Empire
- Branch: Russian Imperial Army
- Service years: 1872–1908
- Rank: Lieutenant General
- Unit: Imperial Russian Army
- Conflicts: Russo-Japanese War; Siege of Port Arthur (surrendered)

Konstantin Nikolaevich Smirnov (Russian: Константин Николаевич Смирнов; 19 May 1854 – 9 November 1930) was a Russian general in the Imperial Russian Army.

== Biography ==
Smirnov was born in Odessa to a family of minor Ruthenian nobility originally from the Minsk Governorate of the Russian Empire. He graduated from the Mikhailovsky Artillery School and the General Staff Academy, and served as commandant of the Odessa Infantry Cadet School from 1896-1898. He was chief of staff of the Warsaw Fortress in 1899. In 1900, he was transferred to the Far East to command the Imperial Russian Army’s Second Infantry Brigade.

With the start of the Russo-Japanese War, Smirnov was appointed commander of the fortress of Port Arthur, Manchuria with a total of over 50,000 men on 4 March 1904. Occupied by the Russians since 1897, the defenses of Port Arthur had been heavily enhanced and modernized in the intervening years, and its position was considered one of the most heavily fortified in the world. However, the previous commander, Anatoly Stessel, chose to interpret the orders to mean that Smirnov was assigned as his subordinate, and remained at Port Arthur, countermanding Smirnov's orders and denying his requests for supplies and reinforcements, and sending misleading telegrams to the Tsar blaming Smirnov for any setbacks and ignoring direct orders from General Aleksei Kuropatkin to leave Port Arthur by a destroyer on 3 July 1904. Stessel's command of the Port Arthur defenses was ineffective throughout the Siege of Port Arthur. Port Arthur was surrendered to the Japanese on 1 January 1905 by Stessel and his close crony General Alexander Fok without consultation to other senior Russian staff, including Smirnov.

After the end of the war, Smirnov published a condemnation of the events, charging Stessel, Fok and others of cowardice and dereliction of duty. He also testified at the court-martial which sentenced them to death on 7 February 1908. This sentence was later commuted to ten years imprisonment. For the charge of cowardice, he was challenged to a duel by Fok, and was wounded in the stomach in the fourth exchange of shots.

Following the October Revolution, Smirnov emigrated to Yugoslavia, where he would die of pneumonia at Pančevo, in what is now Serbia.

== Awards ==
- Order of St. Anne 1st degree with swords (10/24/1904)
- Order of St Vladimir 4th degree, 2nd degree with swords (10/24/1904)
- Order of St. Stanislaus 1st degree with swords (04/08/1904)
