= 4th Siberian Rifle Division =

4th Siberian Division
- 4-я Сибирская стрелковая дивизия
- Active: 1906–1918
- Country: Russian Empire
- Branch: Russian Imperial Army
- Role: Infantry

The 4th Siberian Rifle Division was an infantry formation of the Russian Imperial Army. It was demobilized in 1918.

== Organization ==
- 1st Brigade
  - 13th Siberian Rifle Regiment
  - 14th Siberian Rifle Regiment
- 2nd Brigade
  - 15th Siberian Rifle Regiment
  - 16th Siberian Rifle Regiment
- 4th Siberian Rifle Artillery Brigade

== Commanders (Division Chiefs) ==
- 1905: lieutenant general Alexander Fok
- 1909: lieutenant general Nikolai Krauze
