= Anatoly Stessel =

Russian general (1848–1915)

Anatoly Mikhaylovich Stessel
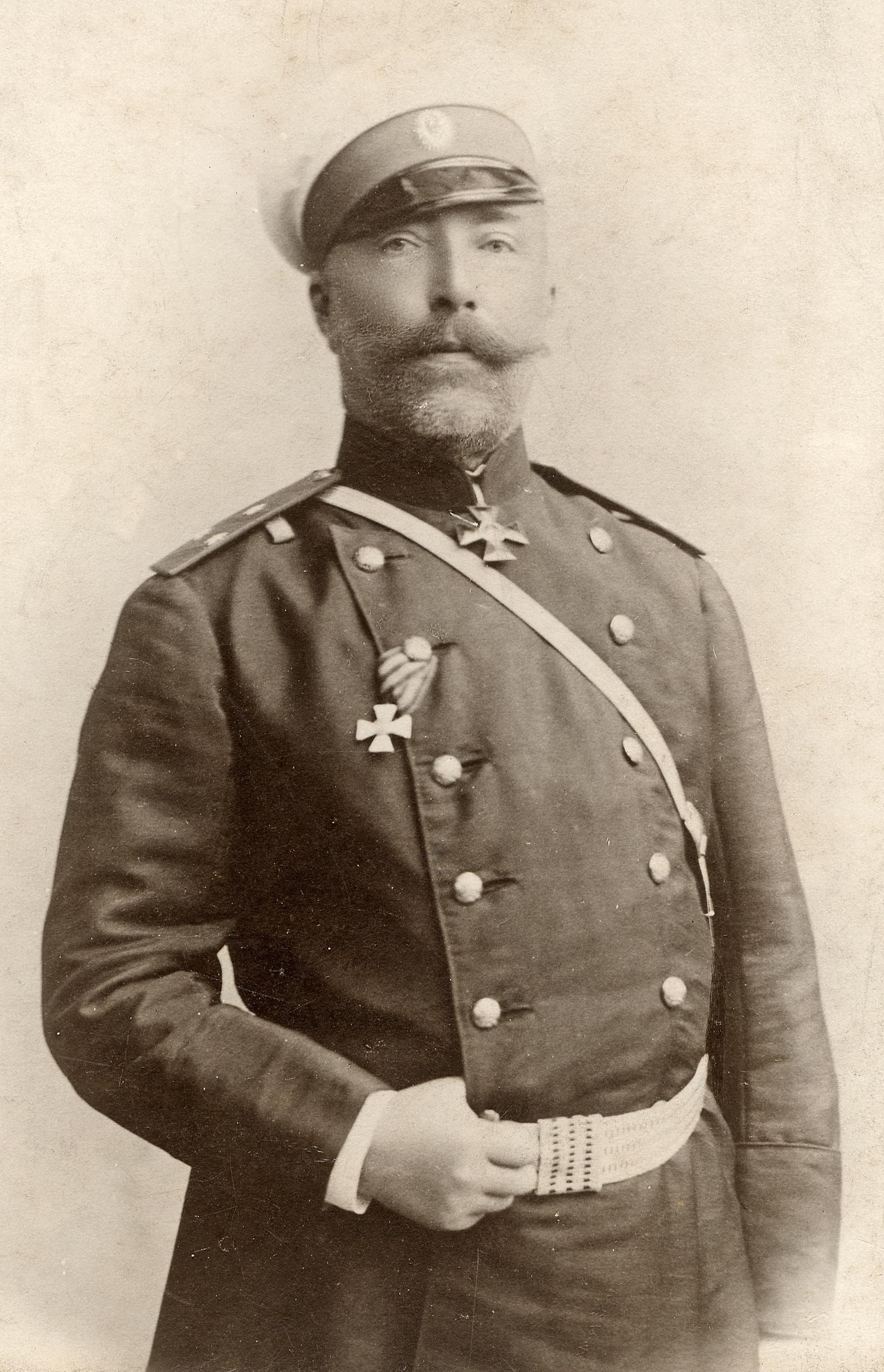
- Anatoly Stessel in the 1890s.
- Born: 28 June 1848
- Died: 18 January 1915 (aged 66); Khmelnik, Podolia Governorate, Russian Empire
- Military career
- Allegiance: Russia
- Branch: Imperial Russian Army
- Service years: 1866–1906
- Rank: General
- Conflicts: Russo-Turkish War; Boxer Rebellion (WIA); Russo-Japanese War; Battle of Nanshan; Siege of Port Arthur (surrendered)

Anatoly Mikhaylovich Stessel (Russian: Анато́лий Миха́йлович Сте́ссель; Anatolij Stößel; 10 July [O.S. 28 June] 1848 – 18 January [O.S. 5 January] 1915) was a Russian baron of German descent, a military leader, and general. He was sentenced to death by a court martial after surrendering the Russian garrison at Port Arthur during the Russo-Japanese War, but pardoned by Tsar Nicholas II.

== Biography ==
=== Education and early service ===
Anatoly Stessel, born in 1848, was the son of Lieutenant General Ivan Matveevich Stessel and grandson of Lieutenant General Ivan Matveyevich Stessel, the commandant of Tsarskoye Selo. He graduated from the Pavel Military School in 1866.

Stessel participated in the Russo-Turkish War (1877–1878). He subsequently commanded the 16th Ladoga Infantry Regiment in 1897, and then from 1897 to 1899 the 44th Kamchatka Infantry Regiment. He was appointed to head the 3rd East Siberian Brigade (1899–1903), and distinguished himself for his role in the suppression of the Boxer Movement of 1899–1901 in Qing China, being wounded in combat during the Battle of Tientsin in July 1900. He was subsequently awarded the Order of St. George (4th degree).

=== Service in the Russo-Japanese War ===
From 12 August 1903 Stessel commanded the Russian garrison of Port Arthur in Manchuria – a total of over 50,000 men. Imperial Russia had occupied Port Arthur from 1897, and had heavily enhanced and modernized its defenses in the intervening years – its position was considered one of the most heavily fortified in the world.

The Russo-Japanese War of 1904-1905 started in February 1904; Stessel was promoted to governor of the Kwantung Military District in March 1904, and Lieutenant General Konstantin Smirnov was appointed as his successor at Port Arthur. However, Stessel chose to interpret the orders to mean that Smirnov was his subordinate, and remained at Port Arthur, countermanding Smirnov's orders and denying his requests for supplies and reinforcements, and sending misleading telegrams to the Tsar blaming Smirnov for any setbacks. He also ignored orders from General Aleksei Kuropatkin (the commander-in-chief of the Russian land forces in Manchuria) to leave Port Arthur on a destroyer on 3 July 1904.

==== Surrender of the Port of Dal'niy ====
The Russian Empire had acquired the Liaodong peninsula from China by lease in 1898 in the aftermath of the First Sino-Japanese War. Russia spent more than 10 million golden rubles developing what was a scattering of Chinese fishing villages into the port city of Dal'niy as its primary warm-water port in Asia, connected to the Trans-Siberian Railway via the branch line Chinese Eastern Railway through Harbin.

On 29 May 1904, the port of Dal'niy was surrendered to the Japanese without a fight after Japanese forces cut it off. Stessel neglected to destroy the port facilities or remove the equipment. About a hundred warehouses, a power plant, railroad workshops, a large quantity of rails and rolling stock, significant coal reserves, and 50 cargo ships fell into Japanese hands intact. Throughout the war, the Japanese used Dal'niy to send reinforcements, weapons, ammunition, and provisions to their troops in Manchuria. Japanese destroyers were also based there.

==== Surrender of Port Arthur ====
Stessel's command of the Port Arthur defenses was ineffective throughout the Siege of Port Arthur (July 1904 to January 1905). In August 1904, after the Japanese victory at the Battle of Nanshan in May 1904, Stessel refused Japanese offers to evacuate the women and non-combatants from Port Arthur, and by autumn food was in short supply.

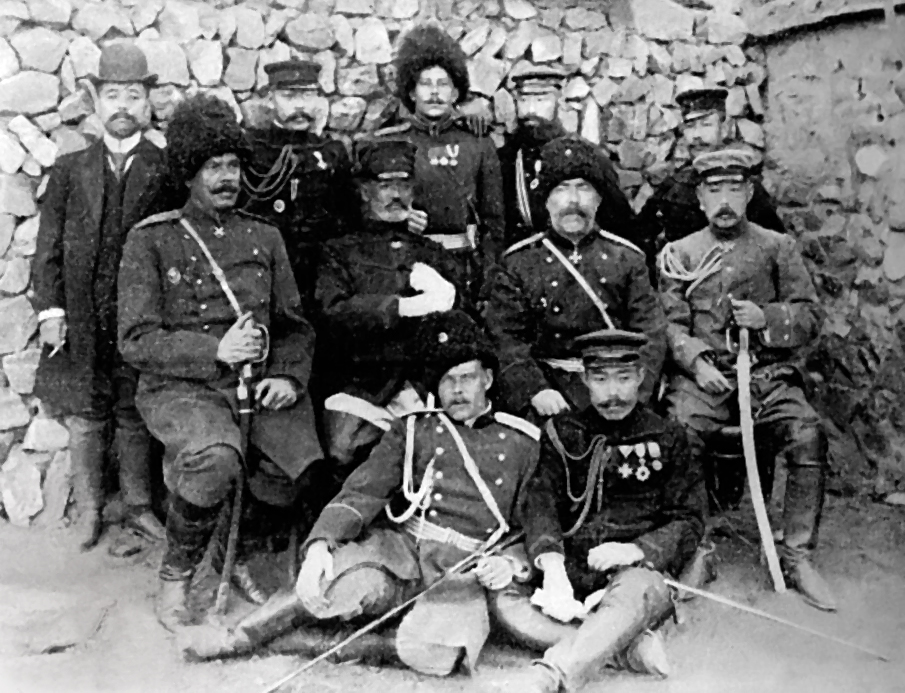
Nogi (center left), Stoessel (center right) and their staffs

Following the death of General Roman Kondratenko on 15 December 1904 at Fort Chikuan, Stessel appointed the incompetent Alexander Fok in his place. On 18 December 1904 the Japanese exploded an 1800-kilogram mine under Fort Chikuan (東鶏冠山北堡塁 in Japanese), which fell that night. On 28 December 1904 a number of mines were detonated under Fort Erhlung, destroying that fort as well.

On 31 December 1904 a series of mines were exploded under Fort Sungshu, Port Arthur's sole surviving major fortress, which surrendered that day. On 1 January 1905 Wantai finally fell to the Japanese. On the same day, Stessel and Fok sent a message to a surprised Japanese General Nogi Maresuke, offering to surrender. None of the other senior Russian staff had been consulted, and many were outraged.

Shortly before Stessel surrendered, the fortress commandant, General Smirnov, who was categorically opposed to the capitulation, had sent a report to Kuropatkin, in which he claimed that Stessel "...due to a lack of knowledge in artillery and engineering matters, is unable to lead the defense of the fortress in these areas; as for the military unit..., given his repeated displays of cowardice, he is incapable of leading this unit either...".

General Nogi accepted the offer of surrender, and the two sides signed a ceasefire agreement on 2 January 1905 at Shuishiying. After occupying the city, the Japanese were surprised to find large stores of food and ammunition. According to Smirnov's testimony at Stessel's court-martial, the fortress still had 23,000 men under arms, 200,000 shells and 7 million rifle cartridges, and sufficient flour supply for 40 days.

While the Japanese interned the surviving men and officers of the Russian garrison at Port Arthur as prisoners-of-war, they allowed Stessel to return to St. Petersburg in comfortable quarters on a British passenger-liner with a trainload of his personal belongings. Stessel remained on active duty until his court-martial began, at which point he resigned "due to illness".

It was in large part due to popular outrage over his conduct that Stessel was subjected to court-martial proceedings. On 13 March 1905 Emperor Nicholas II ordered that an investigative commission be formed to examine the case of the surrender of the fortress to the Japanese by Stessel.

The commission, chaired by Adjutant General H.H. Roop, a member of the State Council, included 12 generals and admirals. After a year of deliberations, he was sentenced to death on 7 February 1908 with a recommendation that his sentence be commuted to ten years imprisonment.

On 6 May 1909 Emperor Nicholas II pardoned Stessel with all rights, titles, and privileges. He died in 1915 in Khmilnyk (in present-day Vinnytsia Oblast, Ukraine).

== Awards ==
- Order of St. George, 4th class
- Order of St. George, 3rd class
- Order of St. Anne 3rd degree, 2nd degree, 1st degree
- Order of St Vladimir 4th degree, 3rd degree.
- Order of St. Stanislaus 1st degree, 2nd degree, 3rd degree
- Order of the Rising Sun, 2nd degree, (Japan)
- Order of the Red Eagle, (Prussia)
- Pour le Mérite, (Prussia)
- Order of Bravery (Bulgaria)
