= Ogawa Mataji =

Japanese general (1848–1909)

Viscount Ogawa Mataji
- 小川 又次
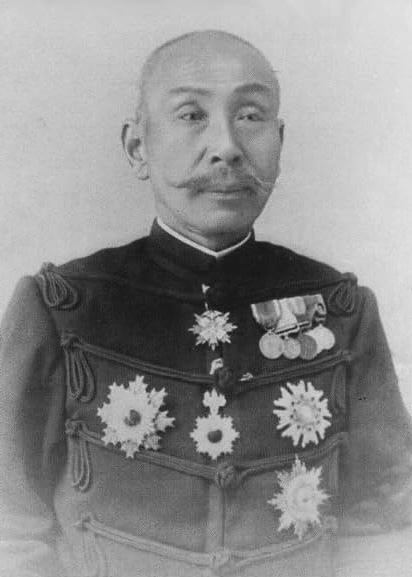
- Born: August 22, 1848; Kokura, Buzen Province, Japan
- Died: August 20, 1909 (aged 60); Tokyo, Japan
- Military career
- Allegiance: Empire of Japan
- Branch: Imperial Japanese Army
- Service years: 1871–1908
- Rank: General
- Conflicts: Taiwan Expedition; Satsuma Rebellion; First Sino-Japanese War; Russo-Japanese War

Viscount Ogawa Mataji (小川 又次; 22 August 1848 – 20 October 1909) was a general in the early Imperial Japanese Army. He was also the father-in-law of Field Marshal Gen Sugiyama.

== Life and military career ==
Ogawa was born to a samurai family; his father was a retainer to the daimyō of Kokura Domain, in what is now Kitakyushu, Fukuoka. He studied rangaku under Egawa Hidetatsu and fought as a Kokura samurai against the forces of Chōshū Domain during the Bakumatsu period.

After the Meiji Restoration, Ogawa attended the Imperial Japanese Army Academy and was commissioned as a second lieutenant in January 1871 and promoted to lieutenant in February 1874. He participated in the Taiwan Expedition of April 1874. Afterwards, he served with the IJA 1st Infantry Regiment under the Tokyo Garrison, and as a battalion commander with the IJA 13th Infantry Regiment from April 1876. From February 1877, he fought in the Satsuma Rebellion, but was wounded in combat in April and promoted to major the same month.

In March 1878, Ogawa was Deputy Chief-of-Staff to the Kumamoto Garrison. He was sent as a military attaché to Beijing from April to July 1880. In February 1881, he was promoted to lieutenant-colonel and chief of staff of the Osaka Garrison. In March 1882, he was chief of staff of the Hiroshima Garrison. Promoted to colonel in October 1884, he was assigned the IJA 8th Infantry Regiment. In May 1885, he joined the Imperial Japanese Army General Staff Office. German General Jakob Meckel, hired by the Japanese government as a foreign advisor and instructor in the Imperial Japanese Army Academy highly praised Ogawa and fellow colonel Kodama Gentarō as the two most outstanding officers in the Imperial Japanese Army. Ogawa was especially noted for his abilities as a military strategist and planner, and earned the sobriquet “the modern Kenshin") from General Kawakami Soroku.

== First Sino-Japanese War ==
Ogawa was promoted to major general in June 1890, and given command of the IJA 4th Infantry Brigade, followed by command of the 1st Guards Brigade. At the start of the First Sino-Japanese War in August 1894, he was chief of staff of the Japanese First Army. In August 1895, he was elevated to the kazoku peerage with the title of danshaku (baron). He commanded the 2nd Guards Brigade from January 1896 and was subsequently promoted to lieutenant general in April 1897, assuming command of the IJA 4th Infantry Division. In May 1903, he was awarded the Order of the Sacred Treasures, first class.

== Russo-Japanese War ==
During the Russo-Japanese War of 1904-1905, Ogawa retained command of the IJA 4th Division under the Japanese Second Army of General Oku Yasukata. The division was in combat at the Battle of Nanshan, Battle of Telissu and Battle of Liaoyang. At the Battle of Liaoyang, Ogawa was injured in combat, and forced to relinquish his command and return to Tokyo. In January 1905, he was promoted to general, but took a medical leave from December 1905. He was awarded the Order of the Golden Kite, 2nd class in 1906. In September 1907 he was elevated to viscount (shishaku) He officially retired in November.

Ogawa died on 20 October 1909 due to peritonitis after being hospitalized for dysentery. His grave is located at Aoyama Cemetery in Tokyo, and he also has a grave in his hometown of Kokura.

== Decorations ==
- 1885 – Order of the Rising Sun, 3rd class
- 1895 – Order of the Sacred Treasure, 2nd class
- 1895 – Order of the Rising Sun, 2nd class
- 1895 – Order of the Golden Kite, 3rd class
- 1903 – Grand Cordon of the Order of the Sacred Treasure
- 1906 – Grand Cordon of the Order of the Rising Sun
- 1906 – Order of the Golden Kite, 2nd class
