= Battle of Nanshan =

1904 battle in the Russo-Japanese War

Coordinates: 39°04′49″N 121°43′27″E

- Part of the Russo-Japanese War
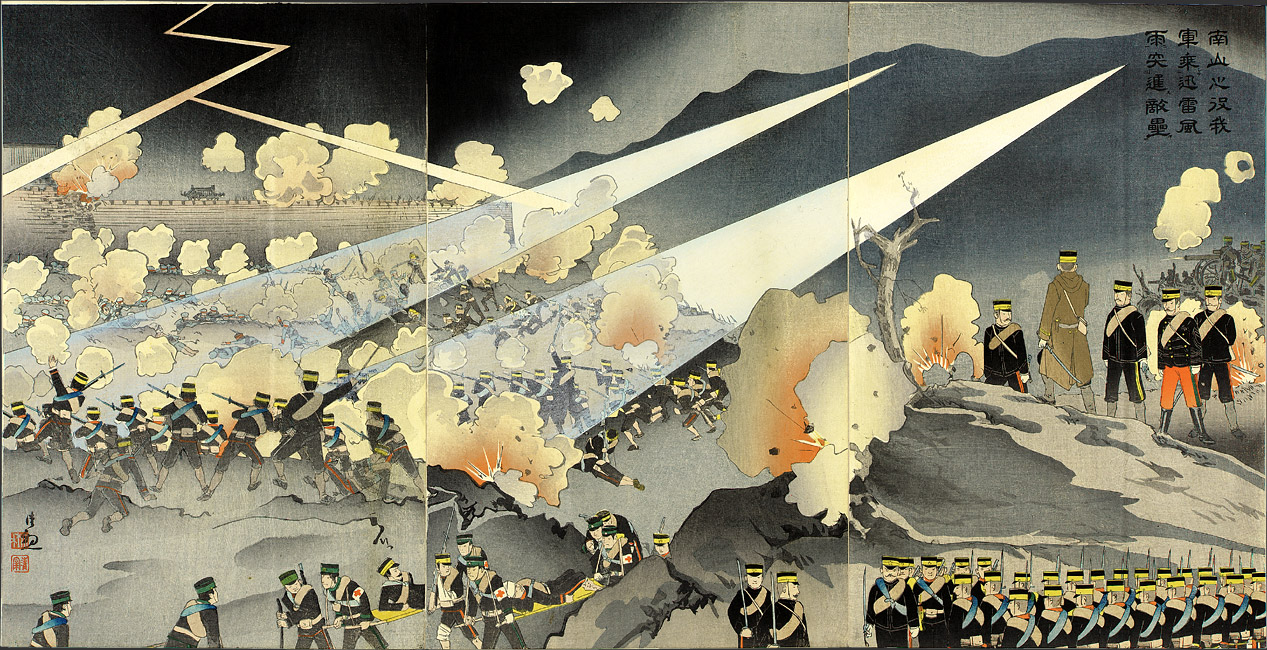
- Japanese assault on the Russian trenches during an lightning storm
Date	24–26 May 1904 (Note: Old Style date: 11–13 May 1904)
Location	North of Port Arthur, Manchuria
Result	Japanese victory

Belligerents
Empire of Japan	Russian Empire

Commanders and leaders
Oku Yasukata	(Russian Empire) Anatoly Stessel (Russian Empire) Mitrofan Nadein (Russian Empire) Alexander Fok (Russian Empire) Nikolai Tretyakov (Russian Empire) Aliagha Shikhlinski

Strength
35,500 to 40,000	3,800: 13,000 to 17,000 in all (did not take part in the battle)

Casualties and losses
6,198 killed, wounded or captured	1,616; 182 killed 836 wounded 598 missing

The Battle of Nanshan (南山の戦い, Nanzan no tatakai), also known as the battle of Jinzhou or Chinchou (Russian: Сражение при Цзинь-чжоу/Кинь-чжоу), was one of many vicious land battles of the Russo-Japanese War. It took place on 24–26 May 1904 across a two-mile-wide defense line across the narrowest part of the Liáodōng Peninsula, covering the approaches to Port Arthur and on the 116-meter high Nanshan Hill, the present-day Jinzhou District, north of the city center of Dalian, Liaoning, China.

== Background ==
After the Japanese victory at the Yalu River, the Japanese Second Army commanded by General Yasukata Oku landed on Pitzewo (modern day Pikou), on the Liaodong Peninsula, some 70 miles northeast from Port Arthur. The Second Army was 38,500 strong and consisted of three divisions: the First Division (Tokyo), Third Division (Nagoya) and Fourth Division (Osaka). Landing was completed by 5 May 1904.

The Japanese intention was to break through this Russian defensive position, capture the port of Dalny, and lay siege to Port Arthur.

Russian Viceroy Yevgeni Alekseyev had been recalled to Moscow for consultations with Tsar Nicholas II. He had left Major-General Baron Anatoly Stoessel in command of Russian ground forces in the Kwantung Peninsula, and Admiral Wilgelm Vitgeft in control of the Russian fleet at Port Arthur. Since no direct orders had been left, the indecisive and incompetent Admiral Vitgeft allowed the Japanese landing to proceed unopposed.

General Stoessel had approximately 17,000 men and the 4th, 5th, 13th, 14th and 15th East Siberian Rifles (all were under the full supervision of General Mitrofan Nadein), from which about 3,000 men of the 5th East Siberian Rifles under Colonel Nikolai Tretyakov were dug into fortified positions on Nanshan hill, where they planned to hold out despite knowing they would be greatly outnumbered. The reserve divisions were under command of Lieutenant-General Alexander Fok, a former police officer who had risen to his position through political patronage rather than experience or ability. The Russian forces had 114 pieces of field artillery, machine guns, and had dug a network of trenches and barbed wire. The Japanese were well aware of the fortifications, as a Colonel Doi of Japanese intelligence was one of the thousands of "Chinese laborers" recruited by the Russians to work on the project in 1903.

== The battle ==
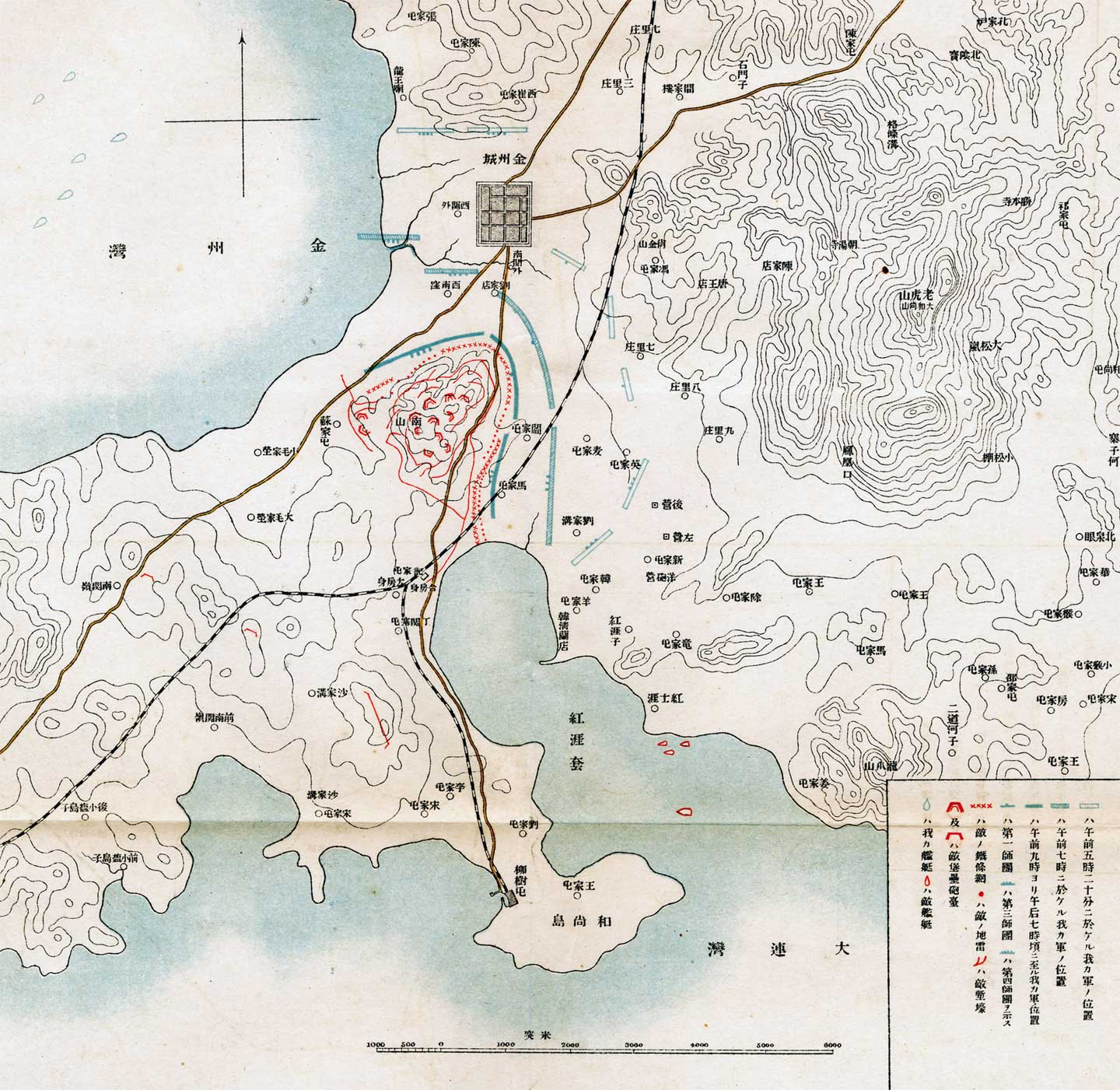
Japanese map of the Battle of Nanshan

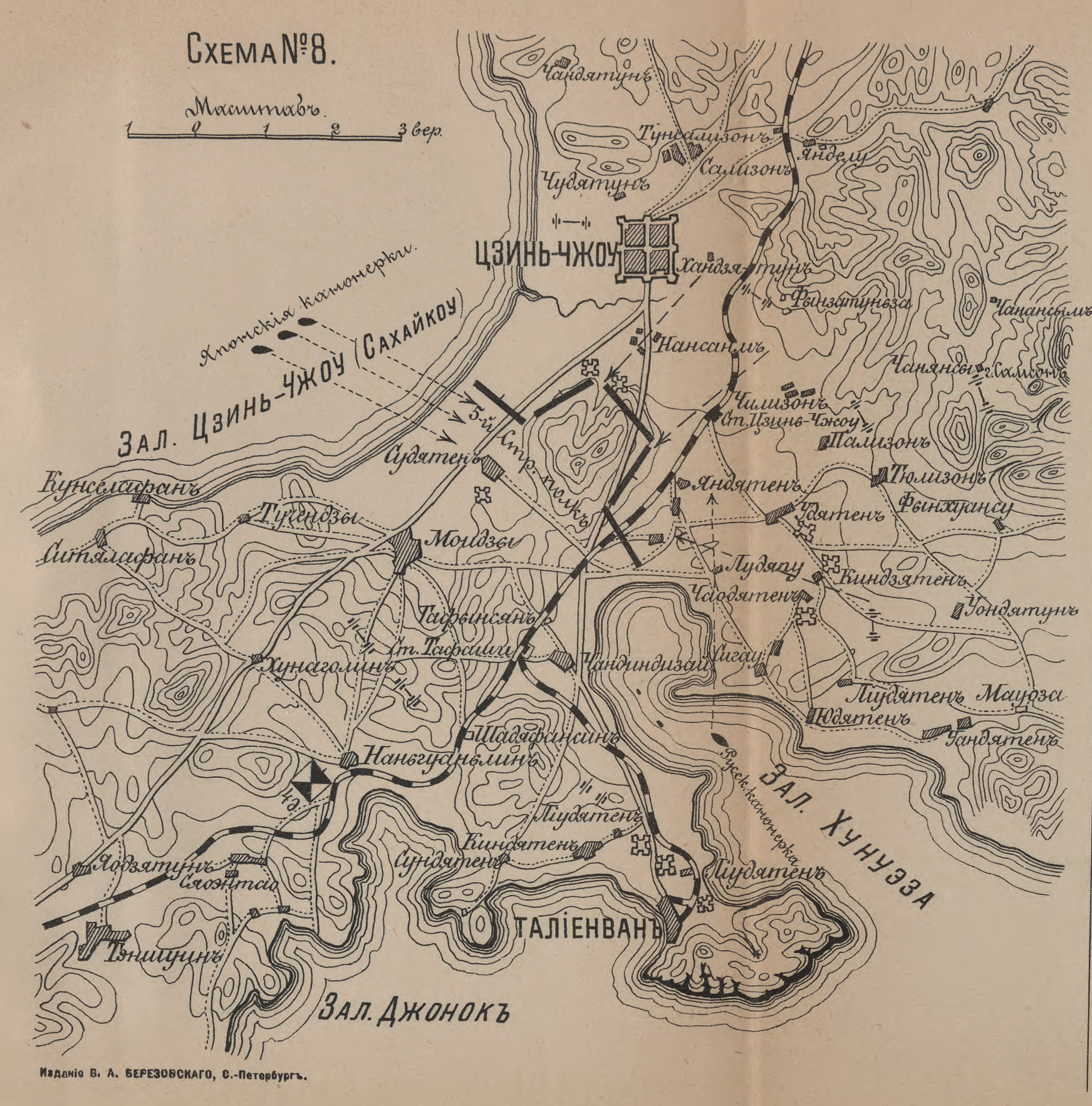
Russian map of the Battle of Nanshan

On the Russian side, the overall direction of the battle was first exercised by General Nadein, and then by General Fok.

On 24 May 1904, during a heavy thunderstorm, the Japanese Fourth Division under the command of Lieutenant General Ogawa Mataji attacked the walled town of Chinchou (modern-day Jinzhou District 金州), just north of Nanzan hill. Despite being defended by no more than 400 men with antiquated artillery, the Fourth Division failed on two attempts to breach its gates. Two battalions from the First Division attacked independently at 05:30 on 25 May 1904, finally breaching the defenses and taking the town.

With his flank thus secure, General Oku could then commence the main assault on the entrenched Russian forces on Nanshan Hill. The assault was postponed a day due to the weather. On 26 May 1904, Oku began with prolonged artillery barrage from Japanese gunboats offshore, followed by infantry assaults by all three of his divisions. The Russians, with mines, Maxim machine guns and barbed wire obstacles, inflicted heavy losses on the Japanese during repeated assaults. By 18:00, after nine attempts, the Japanese had failed to overrun the firmly entrenched Russian positions. Oku had committed all of his reserves, and both sides had used up most of their artillery ammunition.

Finding his calls for reinforcement unanswered, Colonel Tretyakov was amazed to find that the uncommitted reserve regiments were in full retreat: in the midst of battle Nadein ordered 2 battalions from reserve to occupy the empty trenches of the left flank, but for some reason only 2 companies were sent in. Tretyakov's remaining ammunition reserves had been blown up under orders of General Fok. Fok, paranoid of a possible Japanese landing between his position and the safety of Port Arthur, was panicked by a flanking attack by the decimated Japanese Fourth Division along the west coast. In his rush to flee the battle, Fok had neglected to tell Tretyakov of the order to retreat, and Tretyakov thus found himself in the precarious position of being encircled, with no ammunition and no reserve force available for a counter-attack. Tretyakov had no choice but to order his troops to fall back to the second defensive line. By 19:20, the Japanese flag flew from the summit of Nanshan Hill. Tretyakov, who had fought well and who had lost only 400 men during the battle, lost 650 more men in his poorly supported retreat back to the main defensive lines around Port Arthur.

== Results ==
The Russians lost a total of about 1,616 killed, wounded and missing during the battle. Although the Japanese did not win lightly, having at least 6,198 casualties, they could claim victory. Among the 739 dead was the eldest son of General Nogi Maresuke. The Japanese had fired 34,000 artillery shells during the battle – more than had been expended during the entire First Sino-Japanese War. The Japanese had also fired 2.19 million rifle and machine gun rounds in one day of fighting- more than the number (c. 2 million) fired by the Prussians during the entire Austro-Prussian War.

Due to lack of ammunition, the Japanese could not move from Nanshan until 30 May 1904. To their amazement, they found that the Russians had made no effort to hold the strategically valuable and easily defendable port of Dalny, but had retreated all the way back to Port Arthur. Although the town had been looted by the local civilians, the harbor equipment, warehouses and railway yards were all left intact.

After Japan occupied Dalny, a memorial tower was erected on top of Nanshan Hill with the famous poem by General Nogi. The tower was demolished after the Pacific War, and only the foundation is left. A portion of the stone tablet with the poem is now stored in the Lüshun Prison.

== Gallery ==
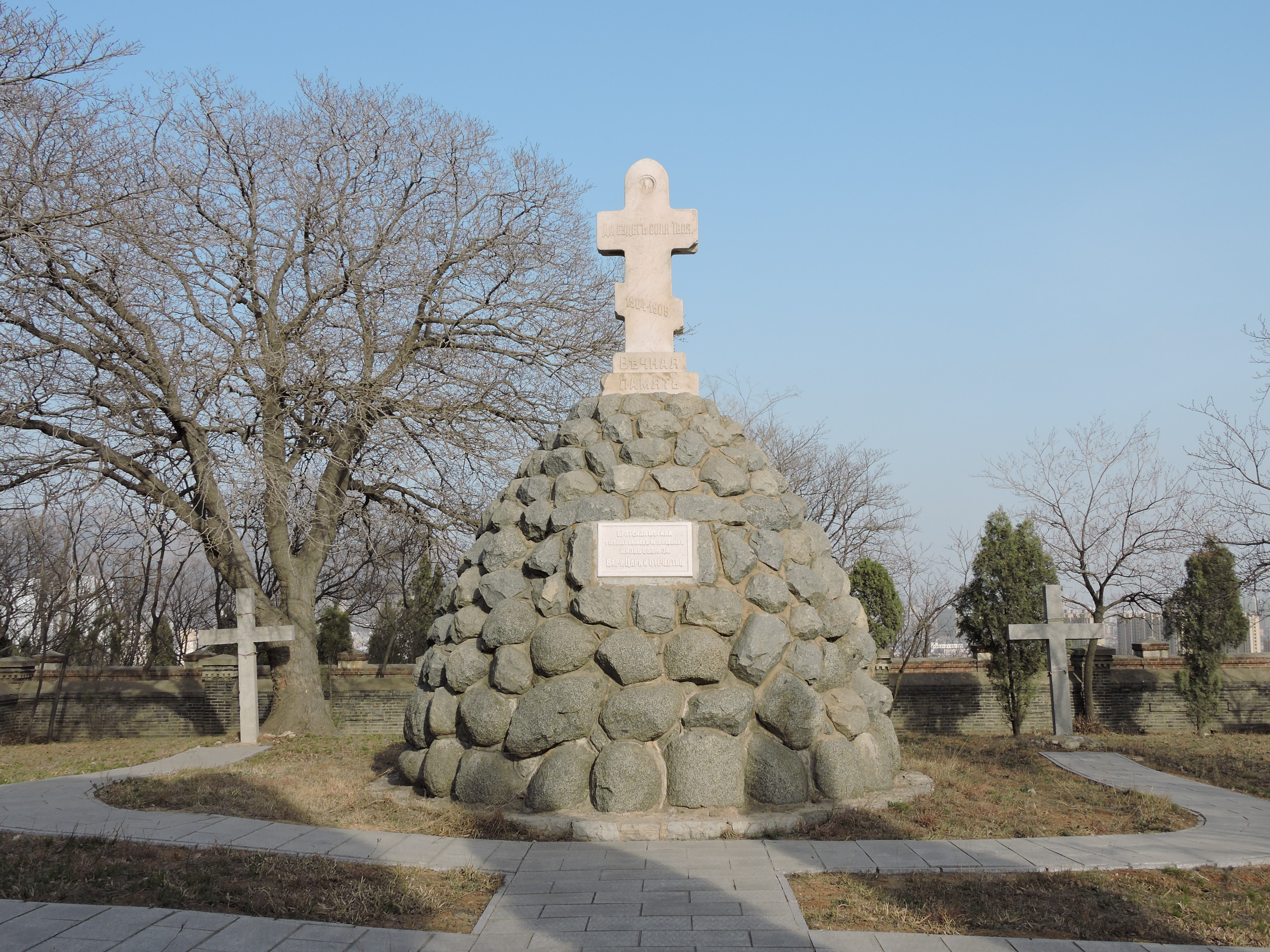
The Russian Army cemeteries at Nanshan Soviet Military Cemetery in Jinzhou

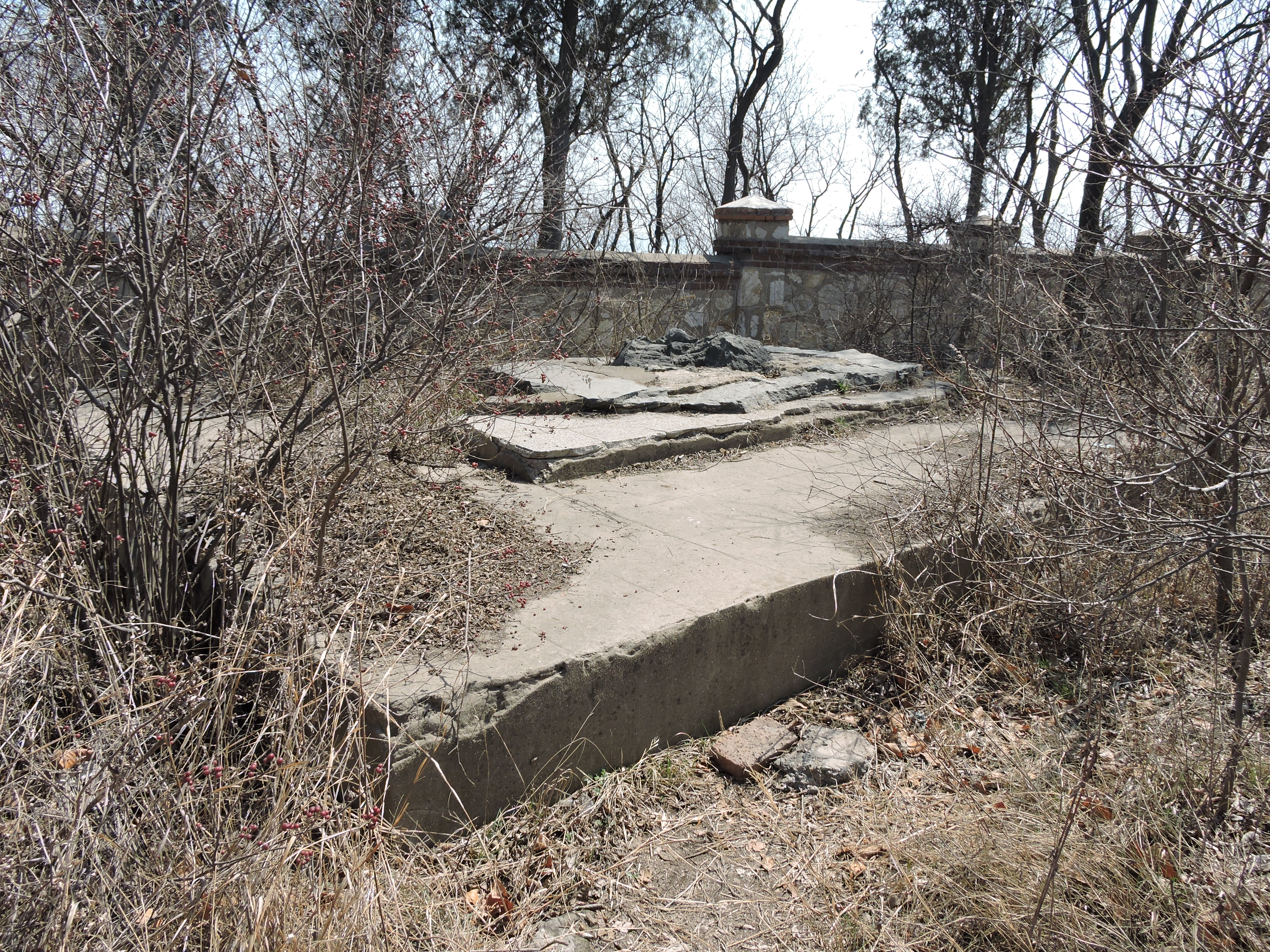
Ruins of the Stele of the poem by Maresuke Nogi

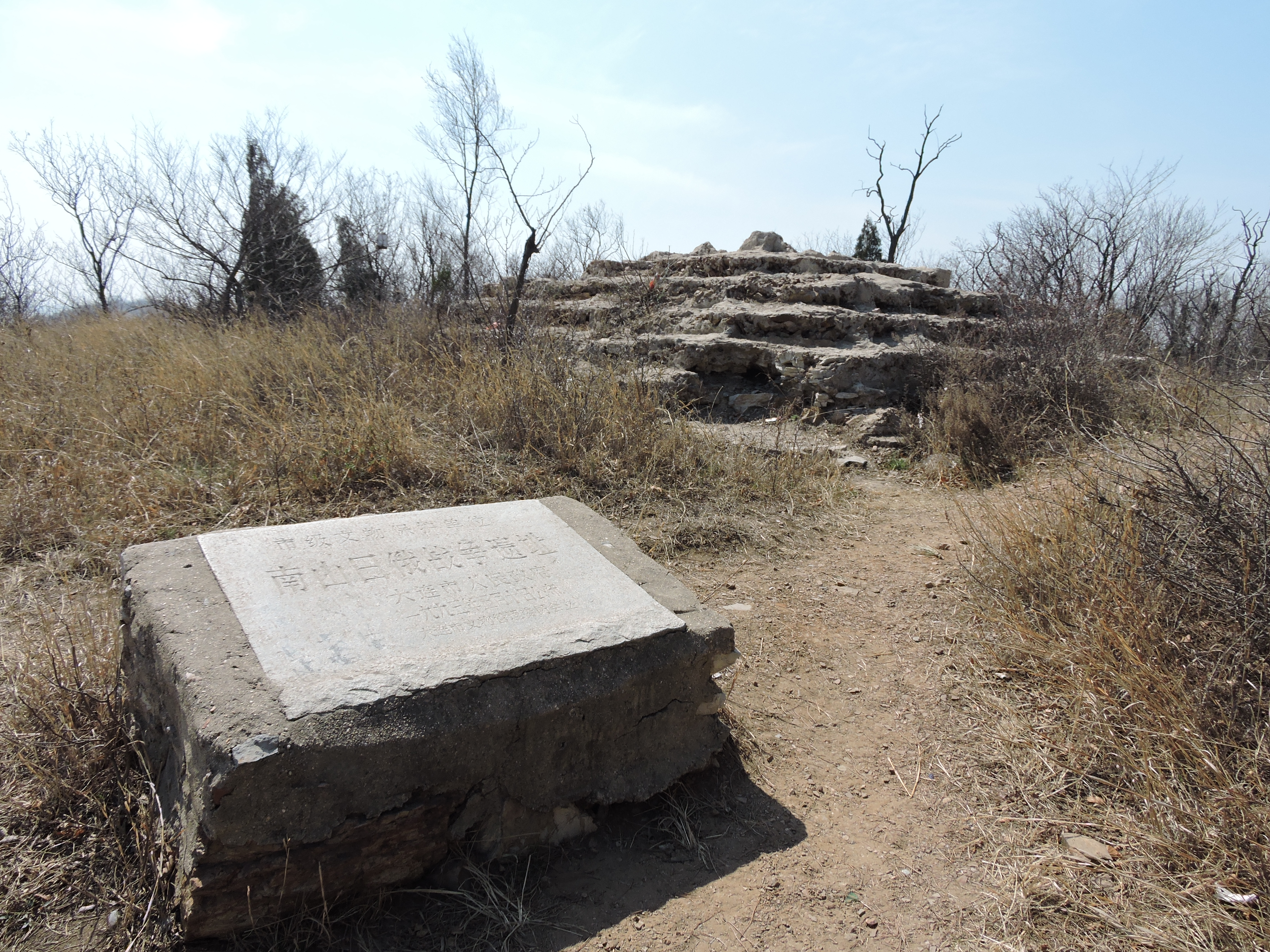
The site of the "Nanshan Achievement Monument"

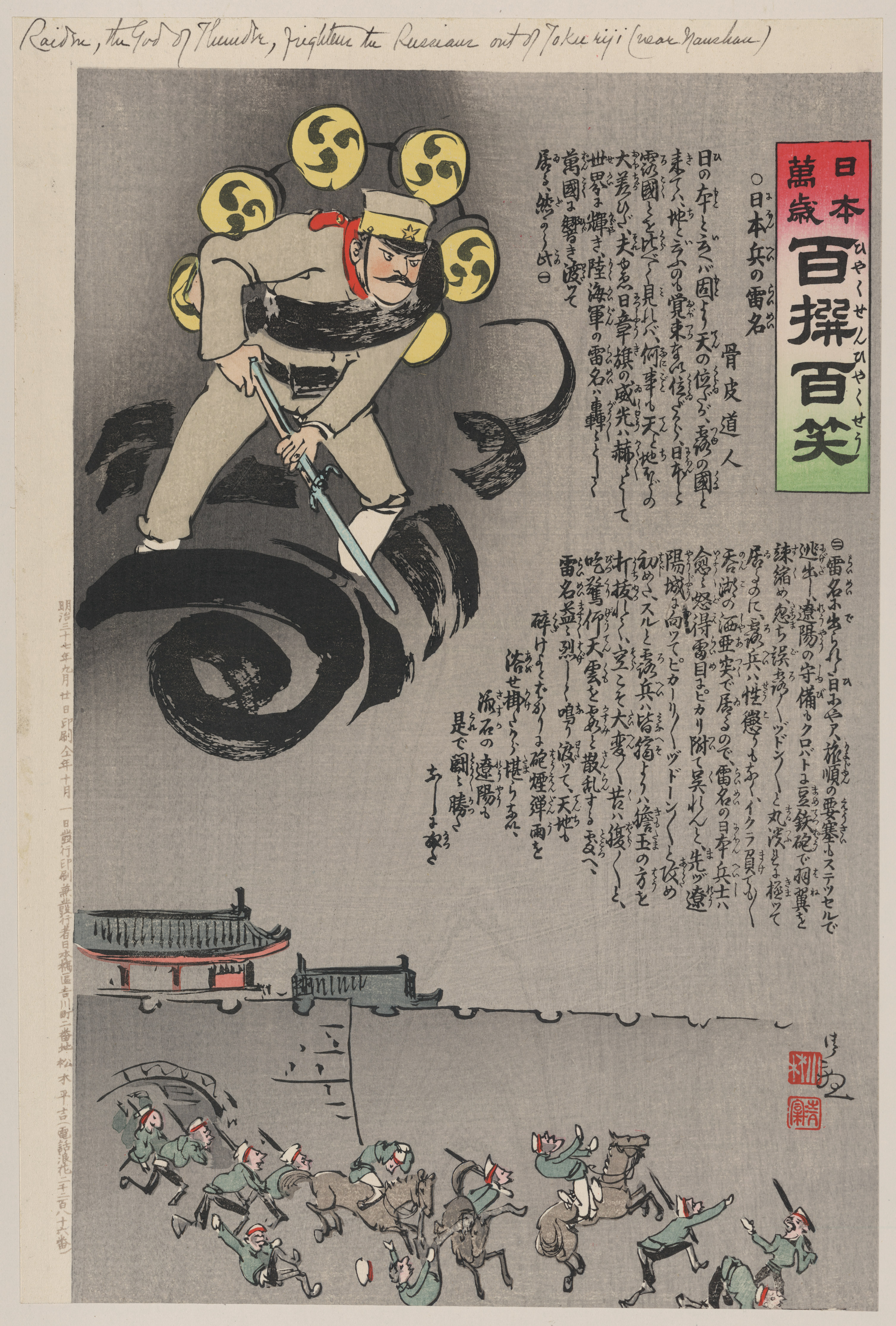
Raijin frightens the Russians out of Tokuriji. Propagandistic print by Kobayashi Kiyochika, 1904.

== Sources ==
- Connaughton, Richard (2003). Rising Sun and Tumbling Bear. Cassell. ISBN 0-304-36657-9
- Jukes, Geoffrey. The Russo-Japanese War 1904–1905. Osprey Essential Histories. (2002). ISBN 978-1-84176-446-7.
- Kowner, Rotem (2006). Historical Dictionary of the Russo-Japanese War. The Scarecrow Press. ISBN 0-8108-4927-5.
- Murray, Nicholas. “Nanshan, Battle of (25-26 May 1904),” Russia at War, Timothy Dowling (ed.), ABC-CLIO, (December 2014).
- Nish, Ian (1985). The Origins of the Russo-Japanese War. Longman. ISBN 0-582-49114-2
- Sedwick, F. R. (1909). The Russo-Japanese War. Macmillan.
- Arsenyev, Konstantin; Shevyakov, Vladimir (1907). Brockhaus and Efron Encyclopedic Dictionary (in Russian). Vol. IIА. Пруссия—Фома. Россия. Friedrich A. Brockhaus (Leipzig), Ilya A. Efron (St. Petersburg). pp. 858–859.
- Bodart, Gaston (1908). Militär-historisches Kriegs-Lexikon (1618–1905) (in German). Vienna and Leipzig: C. W. Stern. p. 593.
