= Nikolai Tretyakov =

Russian military engineer and commander

Nikolai Alexandrovich Tretyakov
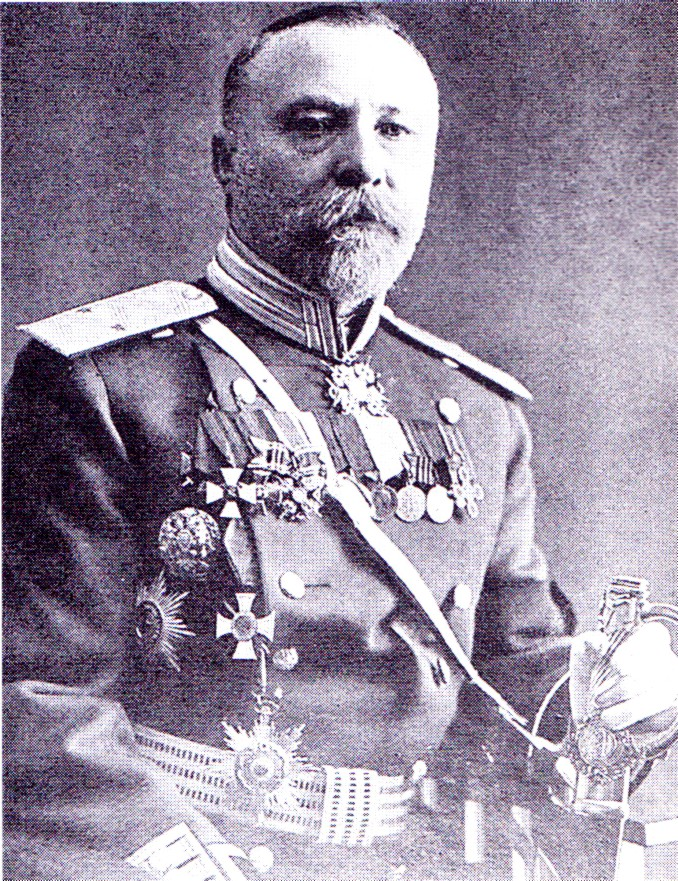
- General Nikolai Tretyakov
- Born: 2 October 1854; Simbirsk, Simbirsk Governorate, Russian Empire
- Died: 5 February 1917 (aged 62); Russian Empire
- Military career
- Allegiance: Russian Empire
- Branch: (Russian Empire) Russian Imperial Army
- Service years: 1872–1917
- Rank: Engineer-general
- Conflicts: Boxer Rebellion; Russo-Japanese War; Battle of Nanshan; Siege of Port Arthur (WIA); World War I

Nikolai Aleksandrovich Tretyakov (Note: In this name that follows East Slavic naming customs, the patronymic is Aleksandrovich and the family name is Tretyakov.) (Russian: Третьяков, Николай Александрович; 2 October 1854 – 5 February 1917) was a military engineer and general in the Imperial Russian Army, noted for his heroic role in the Siege of Port Arthur during the Russo-Japanese War.

== Biography ==
Tretyakov was born in Simbirsk, where his family were members of the local nobility. He graduated from the 2nd Moscow Military Gymnasium on August 10, 1872 and entered military service. In 1875, after graduation from the Nikolaev Engineering School, he was commissioned as a second lieutenant. He was promoted to lieutenant on July 13, 1877 and returned to the Nikolaev Academy of Engineering from which he graduated in 1878, and was subsequently promoted to captain. He became a lieutenant colonel in April 1892, and was assigned command of a sapper company at Vladivostok in April 1893. On May 21, 1895 he became commander of the 1st East Siberian Demining Brigade.

Promoted to colonel on December 25, 1899, Tretyakov was with the Russian expeditionary forces in the Boxer Rebellion in northern China. On February 27, 1901, he was appointed commander of the 5th East Siberian Rifles regiment.

During the Russo-Japanese War of 1904-1905, Tretyakov distinguished himself with a heroic defense against the Imperial Japanese Army at the Battle of Nanshan, during which he was wounded. He was promoted to major general on October 22, 1904 and continued to command the 5th East Siberian Rifles throughout the Siege of Port Arthur.

After the end of the war, on October 17, 1910, Tretyakov became inspector of field engineering in the Kiev Military District. He was promoted to lieutenant general on December 6, 1910. He was made commander of the 10th Siberian Rifle Division on February 28, 1911 and of the 3rd Siberian Infantry Division on October 12, 1911.

At the start of World War I, from August 12, 1914 Tretyakov was in command of the 1st Siberian Infantry Division. He was appointed commander of the Russian 23rd Army Corps on September 5, 1915, but asked to be transferred to the reserves only a week later. In December 1915, he was appointed commander of the Russian XLII Army Corps, and on March 20, 1916 to that of the Russian XXXVII Army Corps. He was promoted to Engineer-general, (a military-technical rank in the Imperial Russian Army), on December 6, 1916.

Tretyakov died of pneumonia on February 27, 1917.

== Awards ==
- Order of St. Stanislaus 3rd degree with swords and bow, 1879
- Order of St. Anne 3rd degree 1880
- Order of St. Stanislaus 2nd degree 1887.
- Order of St. Anne 2nd degree, 1891
- Order of St Vladimir 4th degree, 1895.
- Gold Sword for Bravery, 1901
- Order of St Vladimir, 3rd degree with swords, 1903
- Order of St. George, 4th class, 1904
- Order of St. Stanislaus 1st degree with sword, 1905
- Order of St. Anne 1st degree with swords, 1907
- Order of St Vladimir, 2nd degree, 1913
- Order of the White Eagle, with swords, 1916
- Order of St. Anne 4th degree, 1916
