= Pyotr Kitkin =

Russian and Soviet admiral (1877–1954)

- Born: 12 June 1877; St. Petersburg, Russian Empire
- Died: 18 September 1954 (aged 77) Leningrad, Soviet Union
- Buried: Volkovo Cemetery
- Allegiance: Russian Empire; Soviet Union
- Branch: Imperial Russian Navy; Soviet Navy
- Service years: 1896–1948
- Rank: Rear Admiral
- Conflicts: Russo-Japanese War; Siege of Port Arthur
- Awards: Imperial awards; Saint George Sword; Order of St. Anna II degree; Order of St. Vladimir III degree; Port Arthur Cross; Order of Saint Vladimir IV degree; Order of St. Stanislaus; Soviet awards; Order of Lenin; Order of the Red Banner (twice); Order of the Red Star; Medal "For the Defence of Leningrad"; Medal "For the Victory over Germany in the Great Patriotic War 1941–1945"

Pyotr Pavlovich Kitkin (Russian: Пётр Павлович Киткин; 12 June 1877 – 18 September 1954) was a Russian military commander in the First and Second World Wars, being promoted twice to Rear Admiral, once by the Imperial Russian Navy on 28 July 1917, and once by the Soviet Navy, on 5 November 1944.

== Biography ==
=== Tsarist naval officer ===
In 1896 Kitkin graduated from the Naval Cadet Corps, and on 25 September 1896, was promoted to midshipman with the appointment to the Black Sea Fleet and was enlisted in the 29th naval crew. Between 1896 and 1899 he served on the battleships Chesma and Georgii Pobedonosets, the cruiser Pamiat Merkuria, the minesweeper Ingul and the training ship Berezan. In 1899 he was a flag officer on the flagship of the Black Sea Fleet's practical squadron. In September 1899, he attended the a mine officer classes, and on 7 September 1900 was appointed a mine officer of the 2nd rank. Between 1900 and 1901 he served as a mine officer aboard the gunboat Uralets. Promoted to lieutenant in January 1901, he served that year as a watch officer on the Berezan.

In October 1901 Kitkin was appointed to serve with the Pacific Squadron, and in February 1902 he was appointed a junior mine officer of the 1st rank cruiser Gromoboi. From June 1903 he was junior mine officer of the cruiser Rurik. In September 1903 he was appointed senior mine officer of the cruiser Askold, and he served aboard her during the Russo-Japanese War and the Siege of Port Arthur. In March 1904 he was appointed a mine officer of the 1st rank. After the battle of the Yellow Sea on 28 July 1904, the Askold, with Kitkin aboard, escaped to Shanghai and was interned there. After the war Kitkin went to serve with the Black Sea Fleet once more.

In June 1906 Kitkin served as mine officer of the minesweeper Dunai, and from May 1906 he was the senior mine officer of the battleship Georgii Pobedonosets. In February 1907 he was transferred to the Baltic Fleet and enlisted in the 8th naval crew. Promoted to senior lieutenant in June 1907, he served as mine officer of the destroyer Lyogky from September 1907. In January 1908 he was seconded to the Naval Technical Committee for training, and from June 1908 commanded the torpedo boat Prozorlivy. In November 1908 he was appointed mine officer of the flagship of the commander of the destroyer division, which on 12 March 1909 became the 2nd mine division of the Baltic Sea. From December 1908 he held the rank of First lieutenant. From October 1909 to July 1910 he was senior officer of the gunboat Khivinets, and from 1910 specialised in minesweeping. Promoted to captain 2nd rank in April 1911, he was appointed chief of the Baltic minesweeping division on 15 January 1912. In November 1913 he commanded the lead ship of the division, the gunboat Grozyashchii.

In September 1914, with the outbreak of the First World War, Kitkin was promoted to Captain 1st rank for courageously resisting the enemy. In December 1914, he left the post of commander of the minesweepers, and in May 1915, he was appointed acting commander of the Baltic minesweeping division, before being confirmed in this post. In July 1917 he was promoted to rear admiral.

=== Soviet service ===
After 1918 Kitkin served in the Soviet Navy (RKKF). From 1918 to 1919 he was head of minesweeping, and from 1919 to 1920 the chief of the Baltic mine defences. In 1921 he was arrested by the Petrograd Special Department of the GPU, but was soon released. From 1921 to 1923 he was chairman of the Scientific and Technical Commission of Mine-Trial Experiments, and from 1923 to 1924 the chairman of the mine section of the NTK. From 1924 to 1926 he was the head of the mine testing site. From 1926 to 1931 he was Chairman of the Commission for Marine Mine Experiments. Simultaneously, from 1922-1941, he was teaching at the Naval Academy. In February 1931, he enlisted in the RKKF reserve, and in February 1936 he was dismissed to the reserve. In May 1942, he was appointed captain 1st rank, and from 1942 to 1943 commanded the Svir.

In 1943 and 1944, Kitkin served as a specialist on naval mines for the Military Council of the Baltic Fleet, and from October 1944, was senior engineer-designer of the technical department of the NIMTI Navy. On 27 October 1944, by order of the People's Commissariat of the Navy, his period of freelance hire service, from 1936 to 1942, was counted as active service in the Navy. On 5 November 1944 he was promoted to rear admiral, and in January 1947, he was appointed head of the gunnery training department. In 1946, for his inventions in the field of mine warfare, the VAK approved the award of the degree of Doctor of Technical Sciences.

In May 1948 he retired. He died in Leningrad on 18 September 1954, and was buried on the Literary Bridge of the Volkovo Cemetery.

== Scientific activity ==
During his service in the Navy, many of Kitkin's inventions in the field of mines and trawls were adopted for service: mines arr. 1906, 1908, 1912, a cutter trawl (1913), a cartridge with two drums for the trawler boat (1920), a mine protector and a special purpose subversive cartridge (1928), a device known as a snake trawl (1929) a milestone (1929), special sweeping units for convoys (1936), and a device for the self-explosion of mines (1942).

== Ship ==
After Admiral Kitkin's death, a Soviet ship was named in his honour.

== Medals ==
=== Awards of the Russian Empire ===
- Saint George Sword (1916)
- Order of St. Anna II degree (1913), swords to him (1915);
- Order of St. Vladimir III degree with swords (1915);
- Port Arthur Cross" (191? Year);
- Order of St. Vladimir IV degree (1912);
- Order of St. Stanislaus II degree with swords (1907);
- Order of St. Anne III degree with swords and a bow (1905).

=== Awards of the USSR ===
- Order of Lenin (1945);
- Order of the Red Banner (1944);
- Order of the Red Banner (1948);
- Order of the Red Star (1943);
- Medal "For the Defense of Leningrad" (1943);
- Medal "For victory over Germany in the Great Patriotic War of 1941-1945";
- A gold watch "A staunch defender of the proletarian revolution from the Revolutionary Military Council of the USSR" (1928).

=== Foreign awards ===
- Officer of the Order of the Legion d'Honneur (France).
