= Dongjiguan Mountain =

Hill in Dalian, China

Coordinates: 38°49′52.8″N 121°17′9.3″E

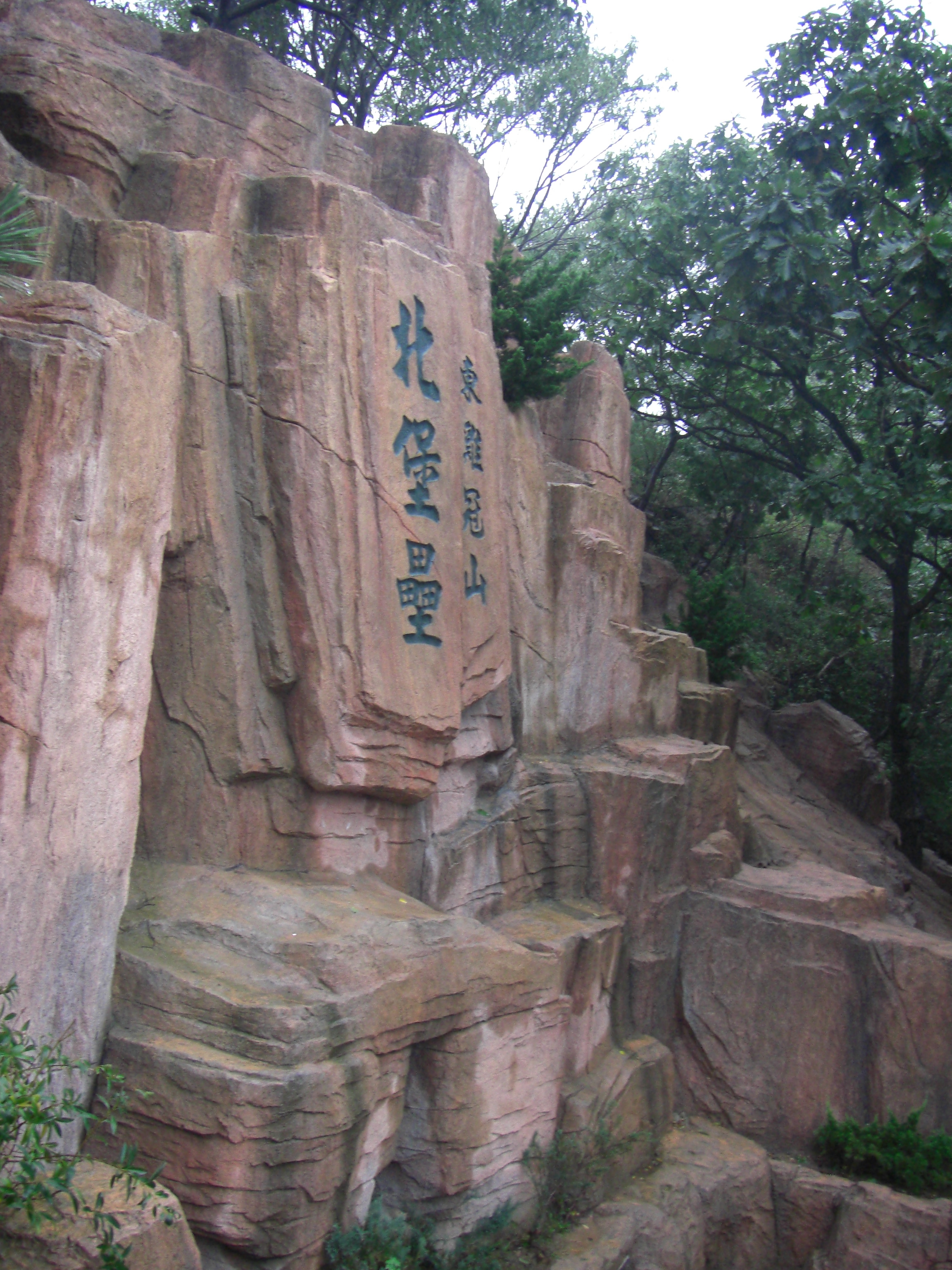
The North Fort at Donjiguan Mountain

Dongjiguan Mountain (Chinese: 东鸡冠山, meaning "East Cockscomb Mountain") or Tongchikuan Mountain is a hill in Lushunkou District, Dalian, Liaoning, China. The Imperial Russian Army built a fort on the north side of this mountain to defend the Lüshun Naval Port.

During the Russo-Japanese War of 1904–05, the Japanese Imperial Army, after several unsuccessful assaults, conquered it in December 1904, one month before the ceasefire. The Russian General Roman Kondratenko was killed in one of these assaults.

Dongjiguan Mountain is now part of the Dongjiguan Mountain Scenic Area where visitors can learn the history of the Russo-Japanese War.

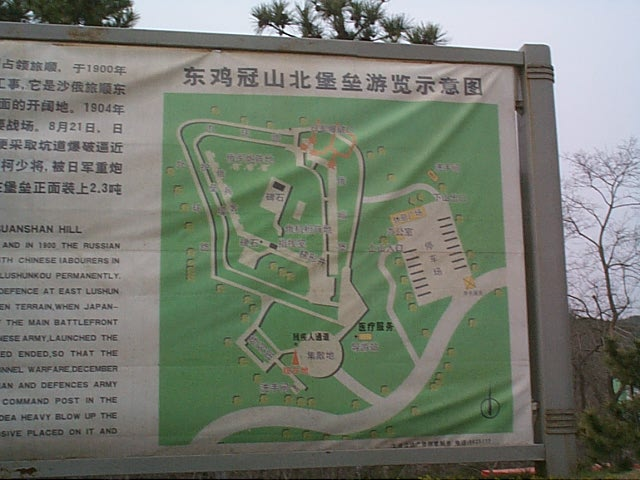
The Layout of the North Fort at Dongjiguan Mountain

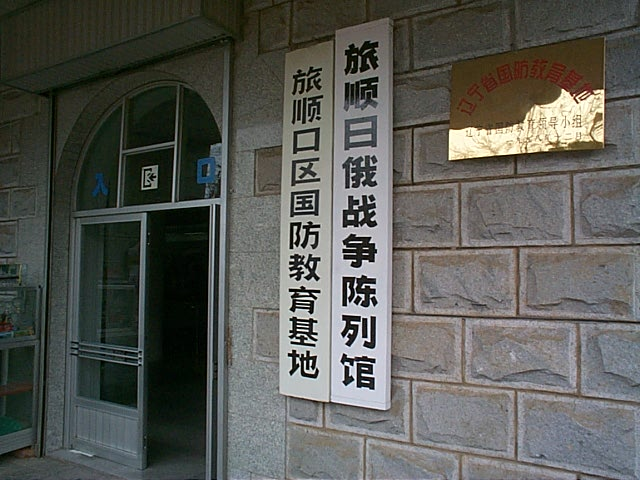
The North Fort is now open to the public for educational purposes

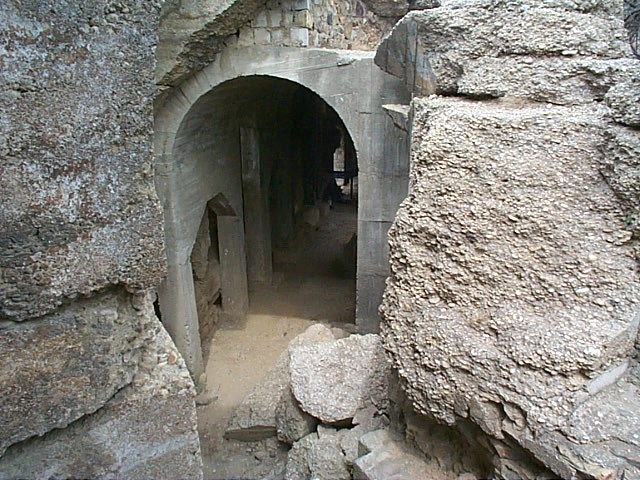
The side entrance to the fort

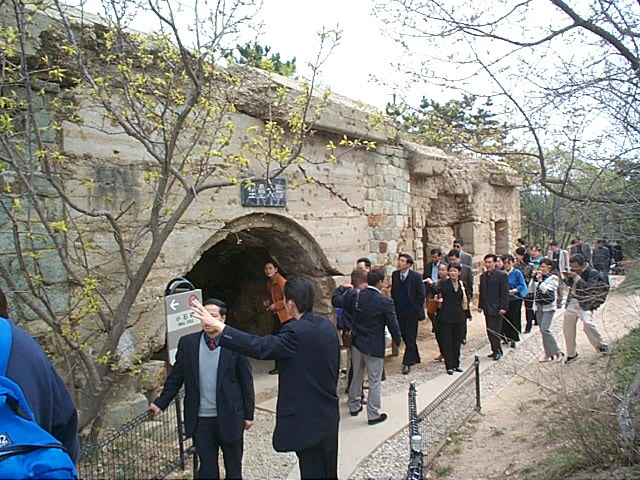
The North Fort of Dongjiguan Mountain, with many domestic and foreign visitors

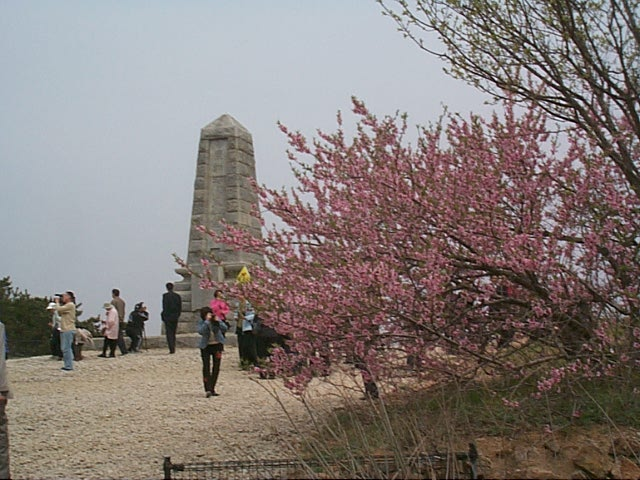
The victory memorial of the North Fort battle

== See also ==
- Siege of Port Arthur
