= Siege of Port Arthur =

Land battle of the Russo-Japanese war

Coordinates: 38°48′45″N 121°14′30″E

- Part of the Russo-Japanese War
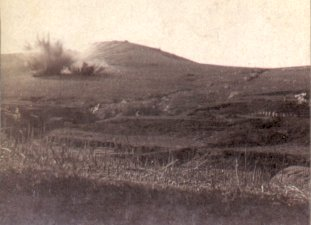
- A Russian shell bursting near Japanese siege guns during the siege
Date	August 1, 1904 – January 2, 1905 (5 months and 1 day)
Location	Port Arthur, Russian Dalian (now Dalian, Liaoning, China)
Result	Japanese victory

Belligerents
Japan	Russia

Commanders and leaders
Nogi Maresuke; Kodama Gentarō; Nakamura Satoru; Tōgō Heihachirō	Roman Kondratenko †; Alexander Fok (surrendered); Konstantin Smirnov (surrendered); Nikolai Tretyakov (WIA)

Strength
201,000: 150,000 troops; 51,000 reserves; 474 artillery pieces	101,000: 50,000 troops; 44,000 volunteers; 12,000 sailors; 7,000 recruits; 506 artillery pieces

Casualties and losses
91,549: 57,780 army casualties; 33,769 sick; 16 warships lost including 2 battleships and 4 cruisers	55,675: 31,306 army casualties; 24,369 captured; Entire fleet lost

The siege of Port Arthur (Japanese: 旅順攻囲戦, romanized: Ryojun Kōisen; Russian: Оборона Порт-Артура, romanized: Oborona Port-Artura; August 1, 1904 – January 2, 1905) was the longest and most violent land battle of the Russo-Japanese War.

Port Arthur, the deep-water port and Russian naval base at the tip of the Liaodong Peninsula in Manchuria, had been widely regarded as one of the most strongly fortified positions in the world. However, during the First Sino-Japanese War, General Nogi Maresuke had taken the city from the forces of Qing China in only a few days. The ease of his victory during the previous conflict, and overconfidence by the Japanese General Staff in its ability to overcome improved Russian fortifications, led to a much longer campaign and far greater losses than expected.

The siege saw the introduction of much technology used in subsequent wars of the 20th century (particularly in World War I) including massive 28 cm howitzers that fired 217-kilogram (478-pound) shells with a range of 8 kilometers (5.0 miles), rapid-firing light howitzers, Maxim machine guns, bolt-action magazine rifles, barbed wire entanglements, electric fences, arc lamp, searchlights, tactical radio signalling (and, in response, the first military use of radio jamming), hand grenades, extensive trench warfare, and the use of modified naval mines as land weapons.

== Background ==
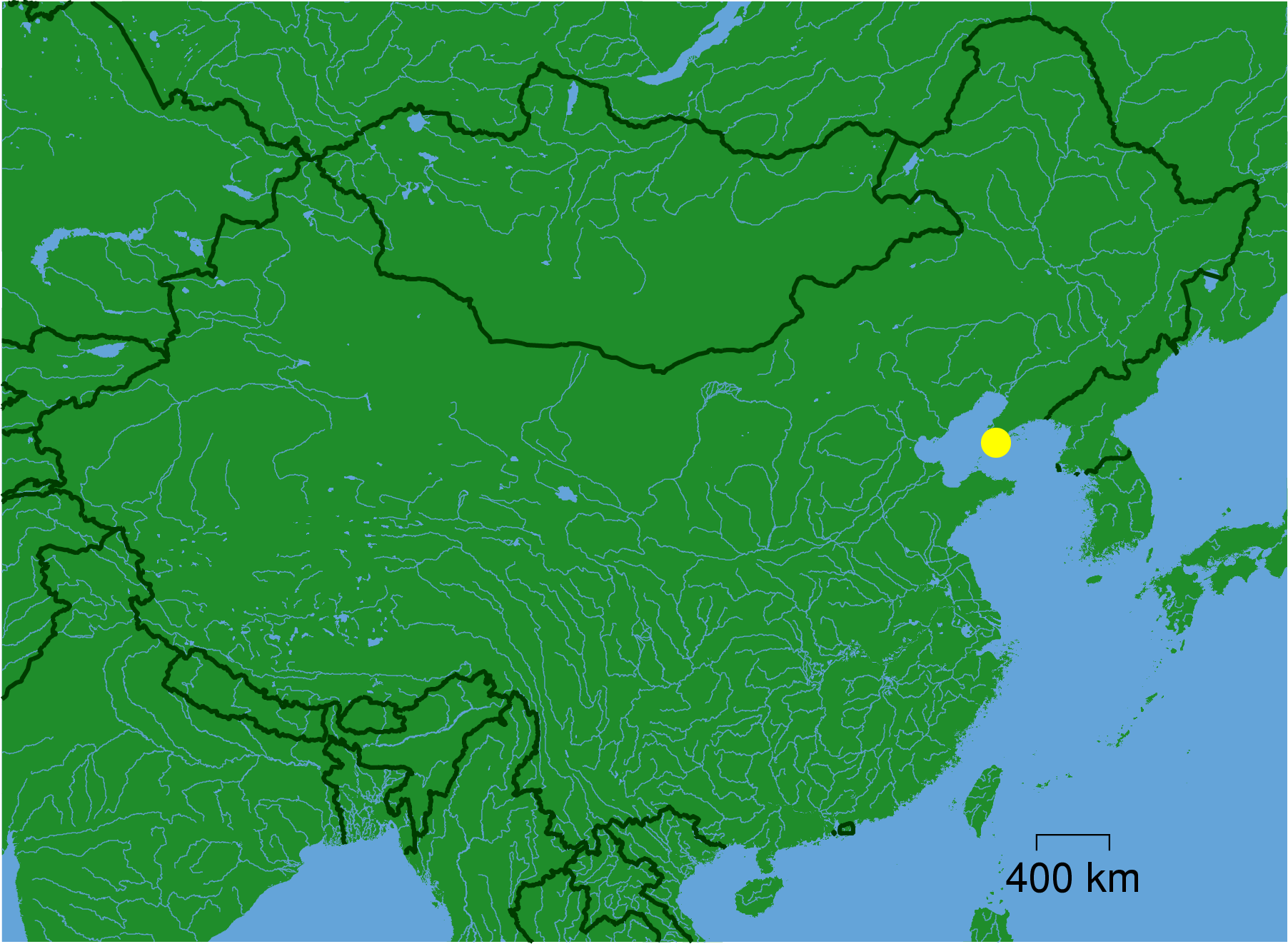
Location within China

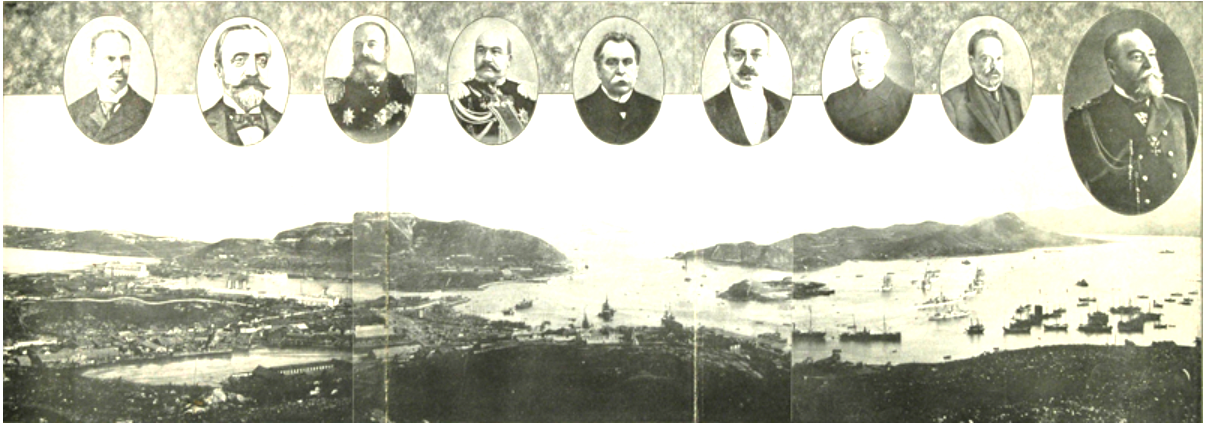
View of Port Arthur with Imperial Russian leaders. From left, Ambassador to China, Pavel Lessar; Ambassador to Japan, Roman Rosen; Minister of Navy, Theodor Avellan; Minister of Army, Vladimir Sakharov: Interior Minister, Vyacheslav von Plehve; Foreign Minister, Vladimir Lambsdorff; Prince Dmitry Khilkov; Finance Minister, Sergei Witte; Viceroy Yevgeni Alekseyev.

The Russian forces manning the defenses of Port Arthur under Major-General Baron Anatoly Stoessel consisted of almost 50,000 men including the crews of the Russian warships in port (the total population of Port Arthur at the time was around 87,000) and 506 guns. He also had the option of removing the guns from the fleet to bolster the land defenses.

Russian improvements to the defences of Port Arthur included a multi-perimeter layout with overlapping fields of fire and making the best possible use of the natural terrain. However, many of the redoubts and fortifications were still unfinished, as considerable resources were either in very short supply or had been diverted to improving the fortifications at Dalny, further north on the Liaodong Peninsula.

The outer defense perimeter of Port Arthur consisted of a line of hills, including Hsiaokushan and Takushan near the Ta-ho River in the east, and Namakoyama, Akasakayama, 174-Meter Hill, 203-Meter Hill and False Hill in the west. All of these hills were heavily fortified. Approximately 1.5 kilometers (0.93 miles) behind this defensive line was the original stone Chinese wall, which encircled the Old Town of Lushun from the south to the Lun-ho River at the northwest. The Russians had continued the line of the Chinese wall to the west and south, enclosing the approaches to the harbor and the New Town of Port Arthur with concrete forts, machine gun emplacements, and connecting trenches.

General Stoessel withdrew to Port Arthur on July 30, 1904. Facing the Russians was the Japanese Third Army, about 150,000 strong, backed by 474 artillery guns, under the command of General Baron Nogi Maresuke.

From the beginning Nogi and the Imperial General Staff differed on strategy, an area they thought little of his abilities in. They wanted him to attack from the northwest as he had done so successfully in the earlier conflict. But Nogi believed the Russians would anticipate that angle for that very reason and so planned his attack from the northeast, which also had the advantage of being closer to the railhead he used as a supply depot. Nogi also saw that position offering the possibility of seizing all the Russian forts in one action, preferably via the direct route offered by the Wantai ravine.

== Battles ==
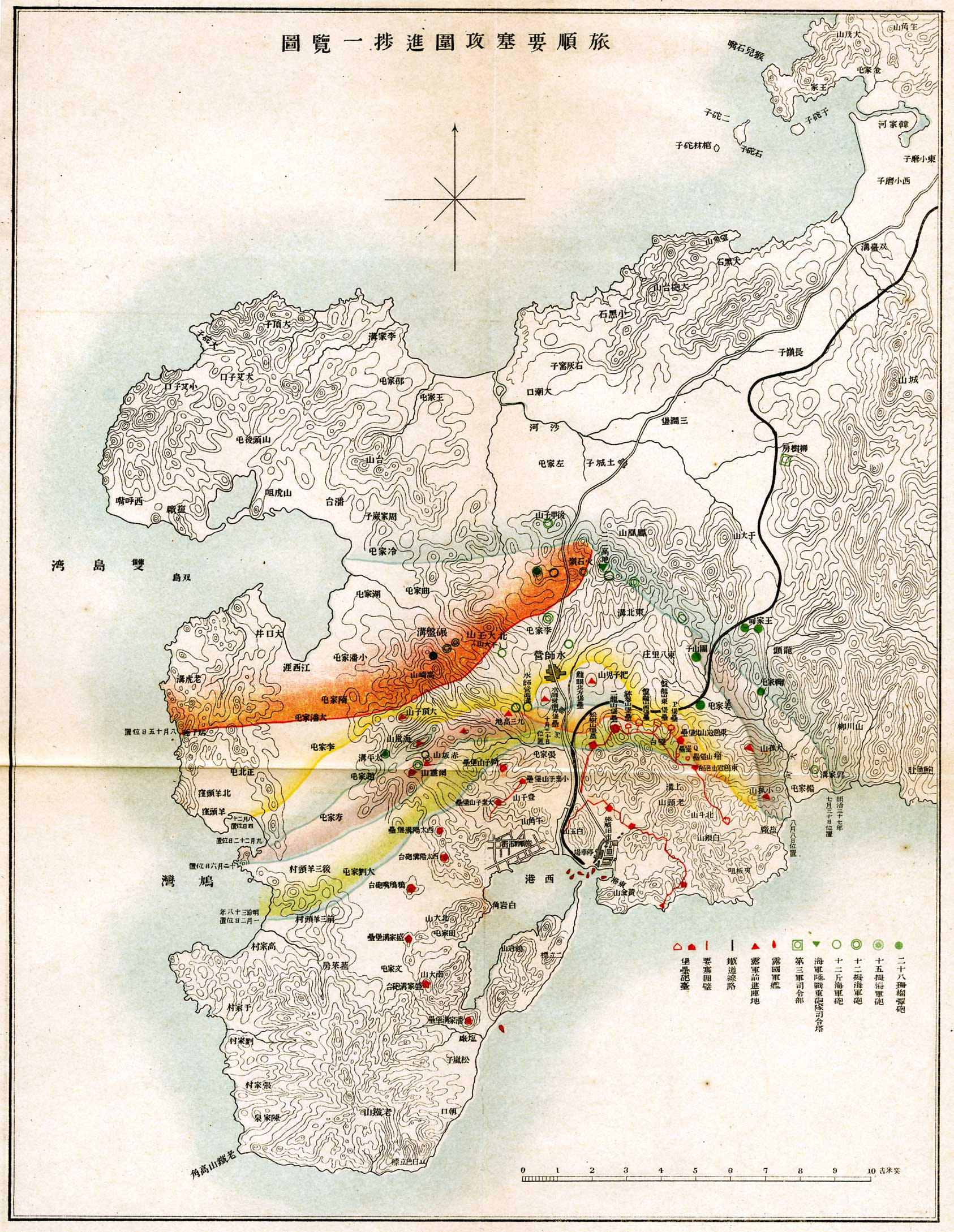
Advances of the Japanese 3rd Army Blue line: July 30, Red: August 15, Yellow: August 20, Green: January 2

=== Battle of the Orphan Hills ===
The shelling of Port Arthur began on August 7, 1904, by a pair of land-based 4.7-inch (120 mm) guns, and was carried on intermittently until August 19, 1904. The Japanese fleet also participated in shore bombardment, while in the northeast the army prepared to attack the two semi-isolated hills protruding from the outer defense perimeter: 600-foot (180 m) high Takushan (Big Orphan Hill) and the smaller Hsuaokushan (Little Orphan Hill). These hills were not heavily fortified, but had steep slopes and were fronted by the Ta River, which had been dammed by the Russians to provide a stronger obstacle. The hills commanded a view over almost a kilometer of flat ground to the Japanese lines, and it was thus essential for the Japanese to take these hills to complete their encirclement of Port Arthur.

After pounding the two hills from 04:30 until 19:30, General Nogi launched a frontal infantry assault, which was hampered by heavy rain, poor visibility and dense clouds of smoke. The Japanese were able to advance only as far as the forward slopes of both hills, and many soldiers drowned in the Ta River. Even night attacks suffered unexpectedly high casualties, as the Russians used powerful searchlights to expose the attackers to artillery and machine-gun cross-fire.

Undeterred, Nogi resumed artillery bombardment the following day, August 8, 1904, but his assault stalled again, this time due to heavy fire from the Russian fleet led by the cruiser Novik. Nogi ordered his men to press on regardless of casualties. Despite some confusion in orders behind the Russian lines, which led to some units abandoning their posts, numerous Russian troops held on tenaciously. The Japanese finally managed to overrun the Russian positions mostly through sheer superiority in numbers. Takushan was captured at 20:00, and the following morning, August 9, 1904, Hsiaokushan also fell to the Japanese.

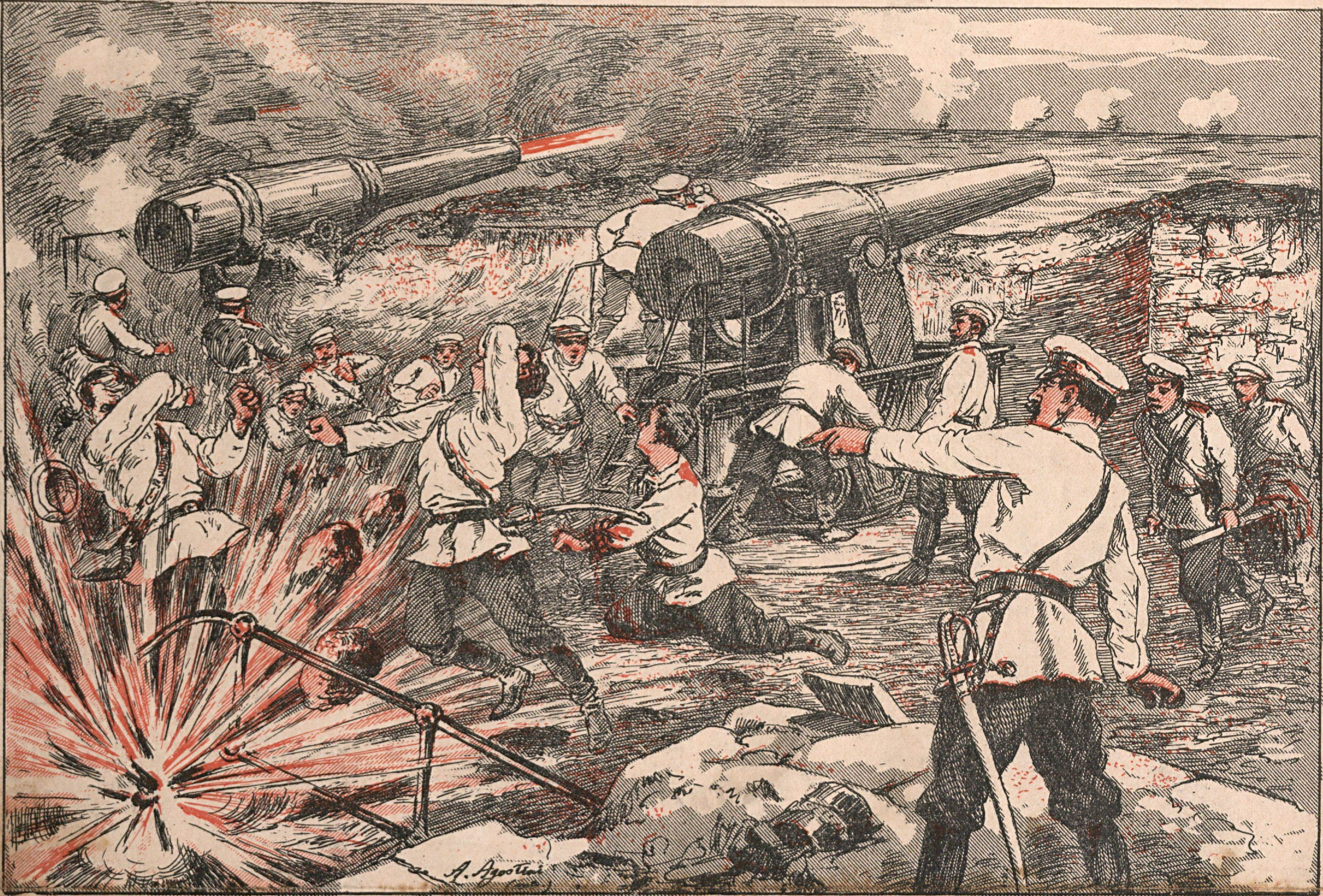
The siege of Port Arthur – Russian batteries against Togo (Angelo Agostini, O Malho, 1904)

Gaining these two hills cost the Japanese 1,280 killed and wounded. The Japanese Army complained bitterly to the Navy about the ease with which the Russians were able to obtain naval fire support; in response the Japanese Navy brought in a battery of 12-pounder guns, with a range sufficient to ensure that there would be no recurrence of a Russian naval sortie.

The loss of the two hills, when reported to the Tsar, caused him to consider the safety of the Russian Pacific Fleet trapped at Port Arthur, and he sent immediate orders to Admiral Wilgelm Vitgeft, in command of the fleet after the death of Admiral Stepan Makarov, to join the squadron at Vladivostok. Vitgeft put to sea at 08:30 on August 10, 1904, and engaged the waiting Japanese under Admiral Tōgō Heihachirō in what was to become known as the Battle of the Yellow Sea.

On August 11, 1904, the Japanese sent an offer of temporary cease-fire to Port Arthur, so the Russians could allow all non-combatants to leave under guarantee of safety. The offer was rejected, but the foreign military observers all decided to leave for safety on August 14, 1904.

=== Battle of 174 Meter Hill ===
At noon on August 13, 1904, General Nogi launched a photo reconnaissance balloon from the Wolf Hills, which the Russians attempted to shoot down. Nogi was reportedly very surprised at the lack of coordination of the Russian artillery efforts, and he decided to proceed with a direct frontal assault down the Wantai Ravine, which, if successful, would carry Japanese forces directly into the heart of the city. Given his previous high casualty rate and his lack of heavy artillery, the decision created controversy in his staff; however, Nogi was under orders to take Port Arthur as quickly as possible.

After sending an immediately refused message to the garrison of Port Arthur demanding surrender, the Japanese began their assault at dawn on August 19, 1904. The General Staff embargoed all correspondents from reporting anything that happened until after Port Arthur had fallen. The main thrust was directed at 174 Meter Hill, with flanking and diversionary attacks along the line from Fort Sung-shu to the Chi-Kuan Battery. The Russian defensive positions on 174 Meter Hill itself were held by the 5th and 13th East Siberian Regiments, reinforced by sailors, under the command of Colonel Nikolai Tretyakov, a veteran of the Battle of Nanshan.

Just as he had done at the Battle of Nanshan, Tretyakov, despite having his first line of trenches overrun, tenaciously refused to retreat and held control of 174 Meter Hill despite severe and mounting casualties. On the following day, August 20, 1904, Tretyakov asked for reinforcements but, just as at Nanshan, none were forthcoming. With more than half of his men killed or wounded and with his command disintegrating as small groups of men fell back in confusion, Tretyakov had no choice but to withdraw, and 174 Meter Hill was overrun by the Japanese; it had cost the Japanese some 1,800 killed and wounded, and the Russians over 1,000.

At Wantai, Nogi had disregarded intelligence on the strength of the Russian defenses (Note: The fault was not his alone. The single Japanese map made available to the 3rd Army did not show the newer Russian fortifications, and depicted those it did show as improvised. Also, while they did visit the front lines, neither Nogi nor his staff used those visits to take a look at Russian positions themselves, relying instead on intelligence gathered by inexperienced junior infantry officers, who often saw their approaches to the enemy lines as a means to bolster their reputations by heroically attacking rather than discreetly assessing formations or troop counts.) that warned they had 10 times as many machine guns as the Japanese, along with an artillery advantage. He was also unaware of a covered road connecting the two forts that allowed the Russians to quickly move troops and materiel between them. Stoessel also repositioned his defenses to better stop an attack from that direction, suggesting he had a spy in Nogi's staff. Japanese troops were under constant fire as they approached, with machine guns raking troops from the front and the rear taking heavy bombardment.

The assaults on the other sections of the Russian line had also cost the Japanese heavily, but with no results and no ground gained. When Nogi finally called off his attempt to penetrate Wantai on August 24, he had only 174 Meter Hill and the West and East Pan-lung to show for his loss of more than 18,000 men. With all other positions remaining firmly under Russian control, Nogi at last decided to abandon frontal assaults in favor of a siege, at least until reinforcements arrived.

On August 25, the day after Nogi's last assault had failed, Marshal Ōyama Iwao engaged the Russians under General Aleksey Kuropatkin at the Battle of Liaoyang. Had the Japanese not lost so many troops at 174-Meter Hill and Wantai, they might have been available to assist Ōyama, giving him the chance to destroy the Russian Army at that battle, instead of merely pushing it further north.

=== Siege ===
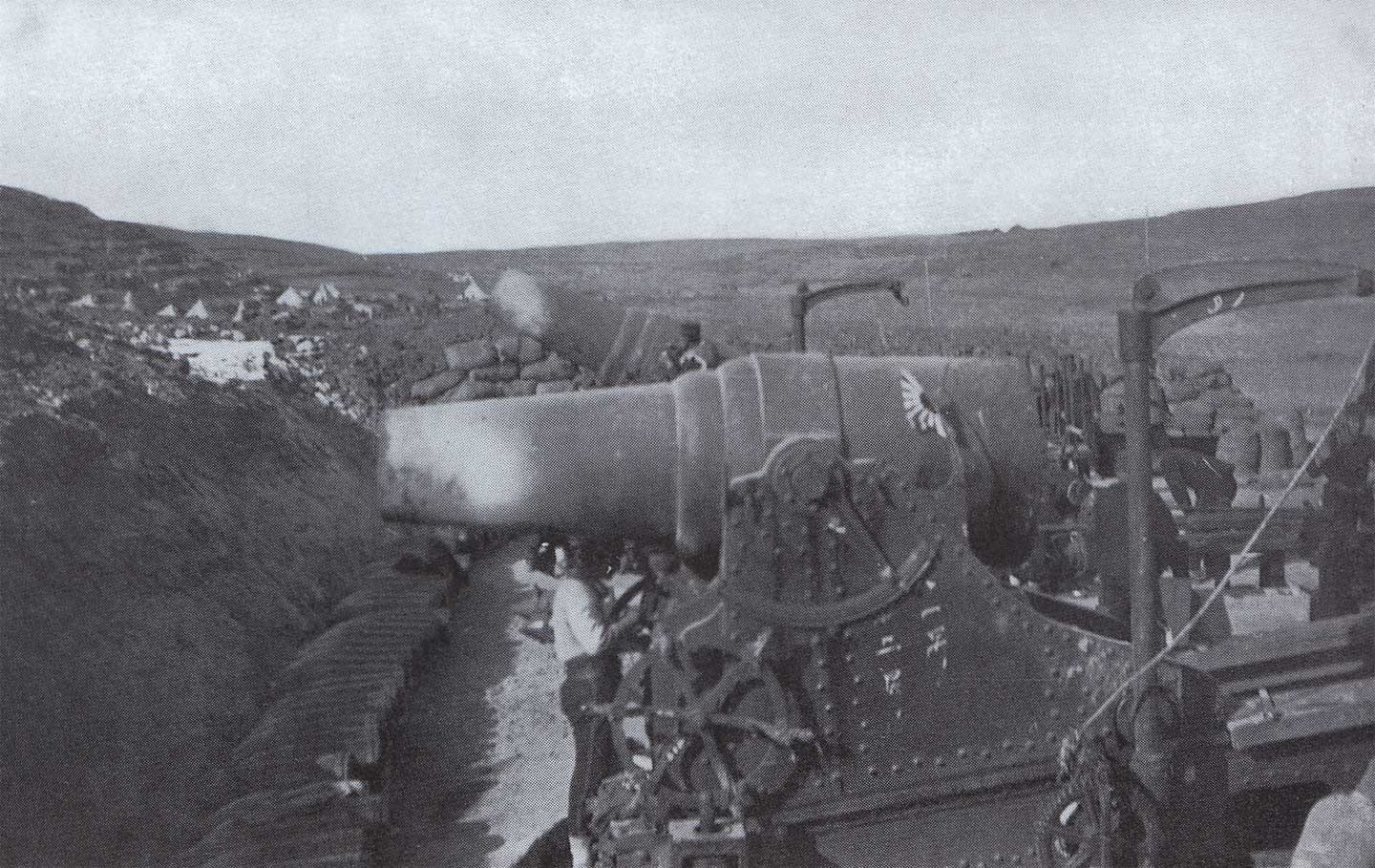
Japanese 11-inch howitzers during the siege of Port Arthur

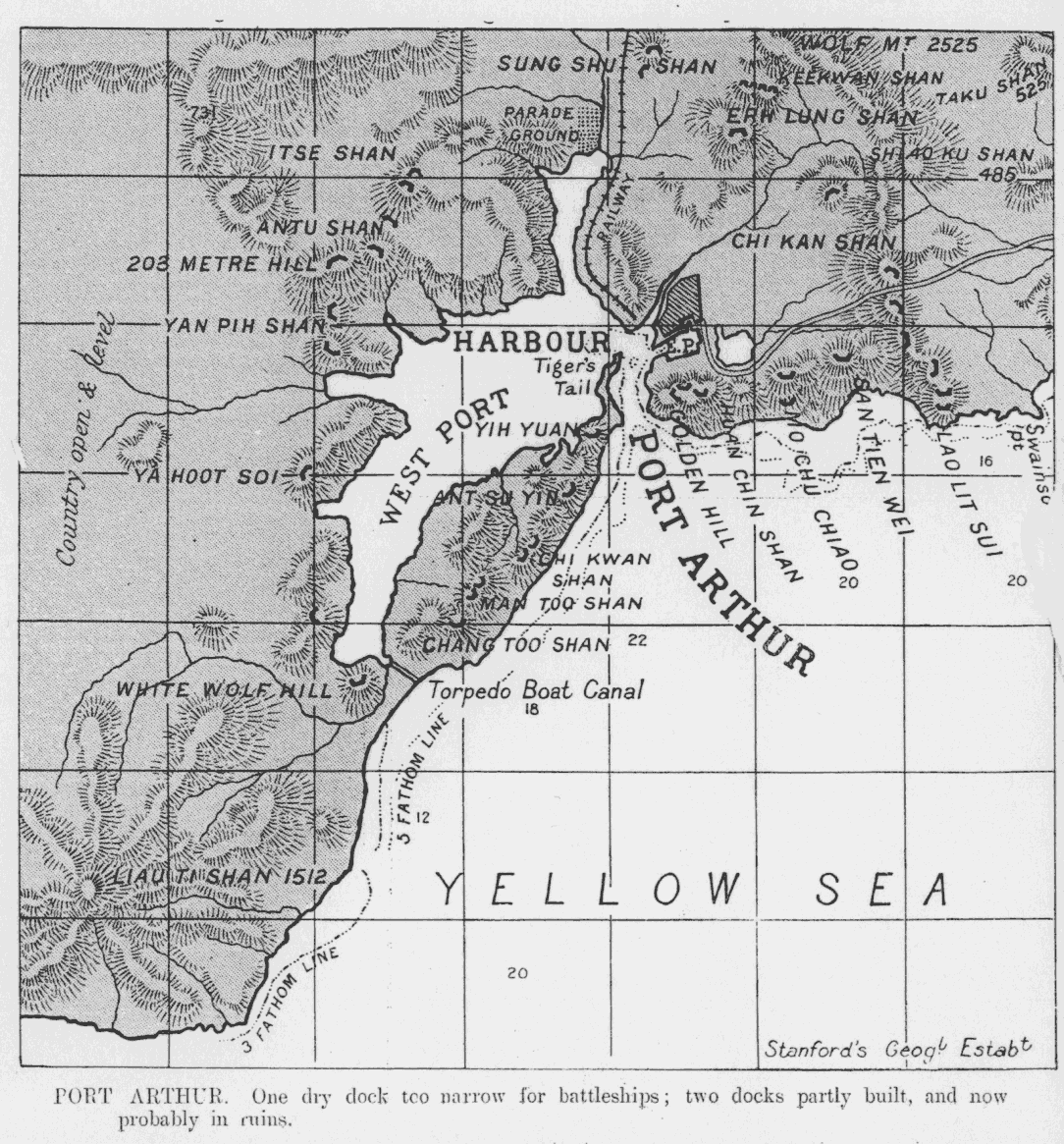
Map of Port Arthur

Having failed to penetrate the Port Arthur fortifications by direct assault, Nogi now ordered sappers to construct trenches and tunnels under the Russian forts in order to explode mines to bring down the walls. By now, Nogi had also been reinforced by additional artillery and 16,000 more troops from Japan, which partially compensated for the casualties sustained in his first assaults. However, the major new development was the arrival of the first battery of huge 11-inch (280 mm) siege howitzers, replacing those lost when the transport Hitachi Maru, loaded with a battalion of the First Reserve Regiment of the Guards, was sunk by Russian cruisers on June 15. The massive 11-inch howitzers could throw a 227-kilogram (500.4-pound) shell over 9 kilometers (5.6 miles), and Nogi at last had the firepower necessary to make a serious attempt against the Russian fortifications. The huge shells were nicknamed "roaring trains" by the Russian troops (for the sound they made just before impact), and during the guns' period at Port Arthur over 35,000 of these shells were fired. The Armstrong howitzers had originally been installed in shore batteries in forts overlooking Tokyo Bay and Osaka Bay, and had been intended for anti-ship operations.

While the Japanese set to work in the sapping campaign, General Stoessel continued to spend most of his time writing complaining letters to the Tsar about lack of cooperation from his fellow officers in the navy. The garrison in Port Arthur was starting to experience serious outbreaks of scurvy and dysentery due to the lack of fresh food.

Nogi now shifted his attention to the Temple Redoubt and the Waterworks Redoubt (also known as the Erhlung Redoubt) to the east, and to 203 Meter Hill and Namakoyama to the west. At this time neither Nogi nor Stoessel seem to have realized the strategic importance of 203 Meter Hill: its unobstructed views of the harbor would have enabled the Japanese to control the harbor and to fire on the Russian fleet sheltering there. This fact was only brought to Nogi's attention when he was visited by General Kodama Gentarō, who immediately saw that the hill was the key to the whole Russian defense.

By mid-September the Japanese had dug over eight kilometers (5.0 miles) of trenches and were within 70 meters (230 feet) of the Waterworks Redoubt, which they attacked and captured on September 19, 1904. Thereafter they successfully took the Temple Redoubt, while another attacking force was sent against both Namakoyama and 203 Meter Hill. The former was taken that same day, but on 203 Meter Hill the Russian defenders cut down the dense columns of attacking troops with machine-gun and cannon fire. The attack failed, and the Japanese were forced back, leaving the ground covered with their dead and wounded. The battle at 203 Meter Hill continued for several more days, with the Japanese gaining a foothold each day, only to be forced back each time by Russian counter-attacks. By the time General Nogi abandoned the attempt, he had lost over 3,500 men. The Russians used the respite to begin further strengthening the defenses on 203 Meter Hill, while Nogi began a prolonged artillery bombardment of the town and those parts of the harbor within range of his guns.

On October 26 Nogi directed the use of the tunnels and saps for another assault on the Russian forts in the northeast. The plan was to fill in the trenches between the tunnel exits and the forts after a three-day artillery bombardment, so as to better facilitate a direct ground attack. However the trenches were much wider than the 50 metres (160 ft) the Japanese had been led to believe by poor intelligence, and to make room for ground troops the Japanese artillery slowed their pace of fire, which also gave the Russians time to repair the damage the shelling did. Eventually the artillery became useless as the heat from the near constant use distorted the barrels, reducing their accuracy. Some of the missed strikes caused further casualties among the Japanese infantry attacking the forts.

Nogi attempted yet another mass "human wave" assault on 203 Meter Hill on October 29, 1904, intending the hill to be a present for the Meiji Emperor's birthday. However, aside from seizing some minor fortifications, the attack failed after six days of hand-to-hand combat, leaving Nogi with the deaths of an additional 124 officers and 3,611 men and no victory.

The onset of winter did little to slow the intensity of the battle. Nogi received additional reinforcements from Japan, including 18 more Armstrong 11-inch (280 mm) howitzers, which were manhandled from the railway by teams of 800 soldiers along an eight-mile (13 km)-long narrow gauge track that had been laid expressly for that purpose. These howitzers were added to the 450 other guns already in place. One innovation of the campaign was the centralization of the Japanese fire control, with the artillery batteries connected to the field headquarters by miles of telephone lines.

Now well aware that the Russian Baltic Fleet was on its way, the Japanese Imperial Headquarters fully understood the necessity of destroying what Russian ships were still serviceable at Port Arthur. It thus became essential that 203 Meter Hill be captured without further delay, and political pressure began to mount for Nogi's replacement.

=== Battle of 203 Meter Hill ===
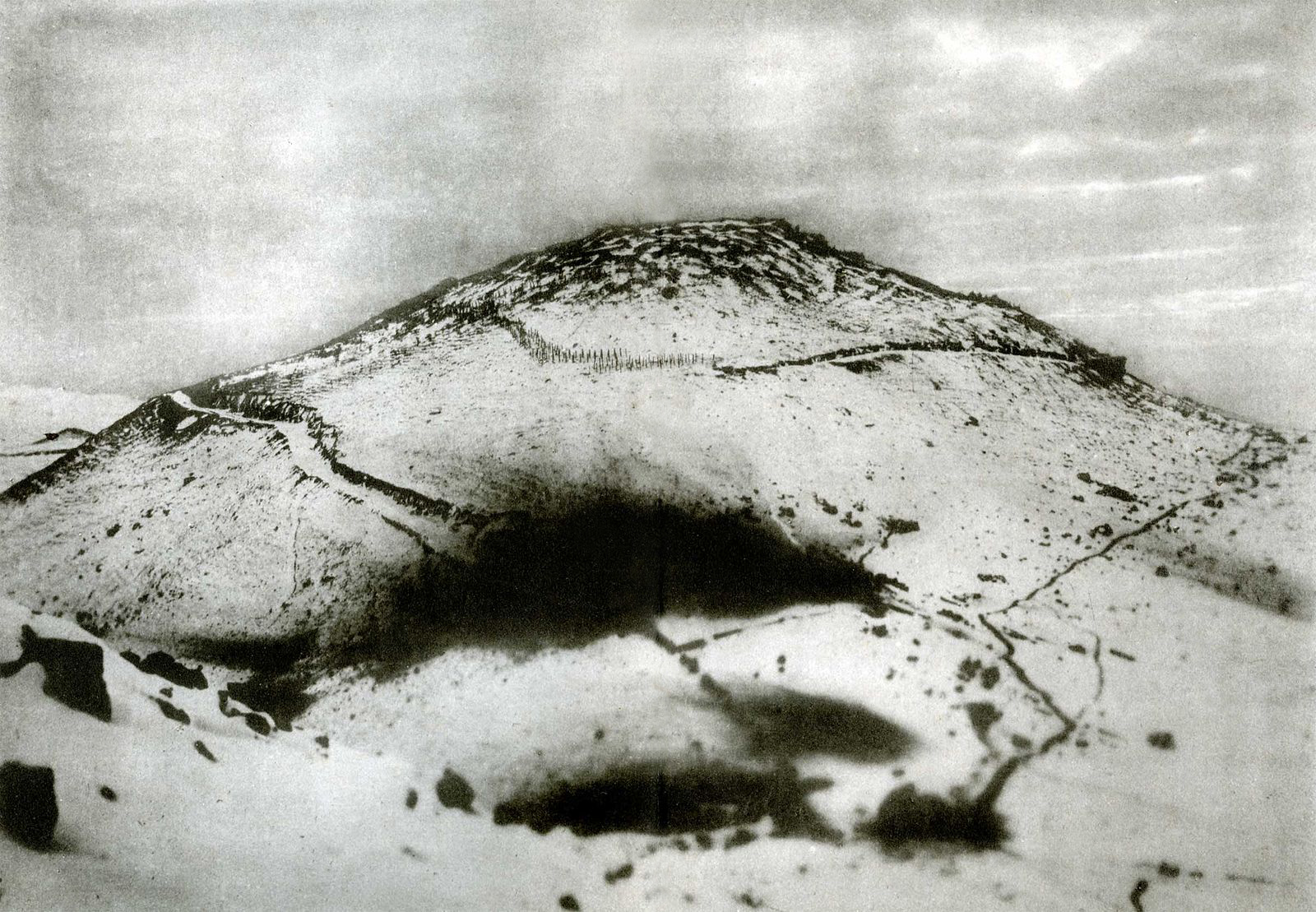
203 Meter Hill, December 14, 1904

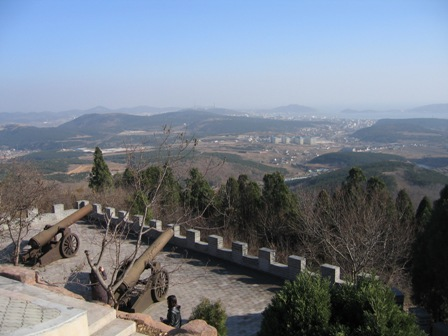
Port Arthur viewed from the summit of the 203 Meter Hill, November 2004

The highest elevation within Port Arthur, designated "203 Meter Hill", overlooked the harbor. The name "203-Meter Hill" is a misnomer, as the hill consists of two peaks (203 meters and 210 meters high, and 140 metres (460 ft) apart) connected by a sharp ridge. It was initially unfortified; however, after the start of the war the Russians realized its critical importance and built a strong defensive position. As well as the natural strength of its elevated position with steep sides, it was protected by a massive redoubt and two earth-covered keeps reinforced by steel rails and timber, and completely surrounded by electrified barbed wire entanglements. It was also connected to the neighboring strongholds on False Hill and Akasakayama by trenches. On top of the lower peak was the fortified Russian command post in reinforced concrete. The Russian defenders entrenched on the 203-meter summit were commanded by Colonel Tretyakov, and were organized into five companies of infantry with machine gun detachments, a company of engineers, a few sailors and a battery of artillery.

On September 18, Japanese General Kodama visited General Nogi for the first time, and drew his attention to the strategic importance of 203 Meter Hill. Nogi directed the first infantry assault against the hill on September 20, but found its fortifications impenetrable to Japanese artillery and was forced to retreat by September 22 with over 2,500 casualties. He then resumed his attempts to break through the fortifications at Port Arthur in other locations, culminating in a six-day general assault at the end of October, which cost the Japanese a further 124 officers and 3611 men. News of this defeat inflamed Japanese popular opinion against Nogi. General Yamagata Aritomo urged his court-martial, but Nogi was saved from this only through the unprecedented personal intervention of Emperor Meiji. However, Field Marshal Oyama Iwao found the continuing unavailability of the 3rd Army's manpower to be intolerable, and sent General Kodama Gentarō to compel Nogi to take drastic action, or else relieve him of command. Kodama returned to visit Nogi again in mid-November, but decided to give him one last chance. After arduous sapping work and an artillery assault with the new Armstrong 11-inch siege guns, mines were exploded underneath some of the Russian fortifications on the main defense perimeter from November 17–24, with a general assault planned for the night of November 26. Coincidentally, this was the same day that the Russian Baltic Fleet was entering the Indian Ocean. The assault contained a forlorn hope attack by 2600 men (including 1200 from the newly arrived IJA 7th Division) led by General Nakamura Satoru, but the attack failed, with direct frontal assaults on both Fort Erhlung and Fort Sungshu once again beaten back by the Russian defenders. Japanese casualties were officially 4,000 men, but unofficially perhaps twice as high. Russian General Roman Kondratenko took the precaution of stationing snipers to shoot any of his front line troops attempting to abandon their positions. At 8:30 a.m. on November 28, with massive artillery support, Japanese troops again attempted an assault up the sides of both Akasakayama and 203 Meter Hill. Over a thousand 500 lb (230 kg) shells from the 11-inch (280 mm) howitzers were fired in a single day to support this attack. The Japanese reached as far as the Russian line of barbed wire entanglements by daybreak and held their ground throughout the following day, while their artillery kept the defenders busy by a continuous bombardment. Nonetheless, the Japanese forces suffered serious losses, as the Russian defenders were well positioned to use hand grenades and machine guns against the tightly packed mass of Japanese soldiers. On November 30, a small party of Japanese succeeded in planting the Japanese flag at the summit of the hill, but by the morning of December 1, the Russians had successfully counterattacked. Still retaining the authority to replace Nogi if necessary, Kodama assumed temporary command of the Japanese front-line forces, but officially maintained the despondent Nogi in nominal command.

The battle continued throughout the following days with very heavy hand-to-hand combat with control of the summit changing hands several times. Finally, at 10:30 a.m. on December 5, following another massive artillery bombardment during which Russian Colonel Tretyakov was severely wounded, the Japanese managed to overrun 203 Meter Hill, finding only a handful of defenders still alive on the summit. The Russians launched two counter-attacks to retake the hill, both of which failed, and by 5 p.m., 203 Meter Hill was securely under Japanese control.

For Japan, the cost of capturing this landmark was great, with over 8,000 dead and wounded in the final assault alone, including most of the IJA 7th Division. For Nogi, the cost of capturing 203 Meter Hill was made even more poignant when he received word that his last surviving son had been killed in action during the final assault on the hill. The Russians, who had no more than 1,500 men on the hill at any one time, lost over 6,000 killed and wounded.

=== Destruction of the Russian Pacific fleet ===
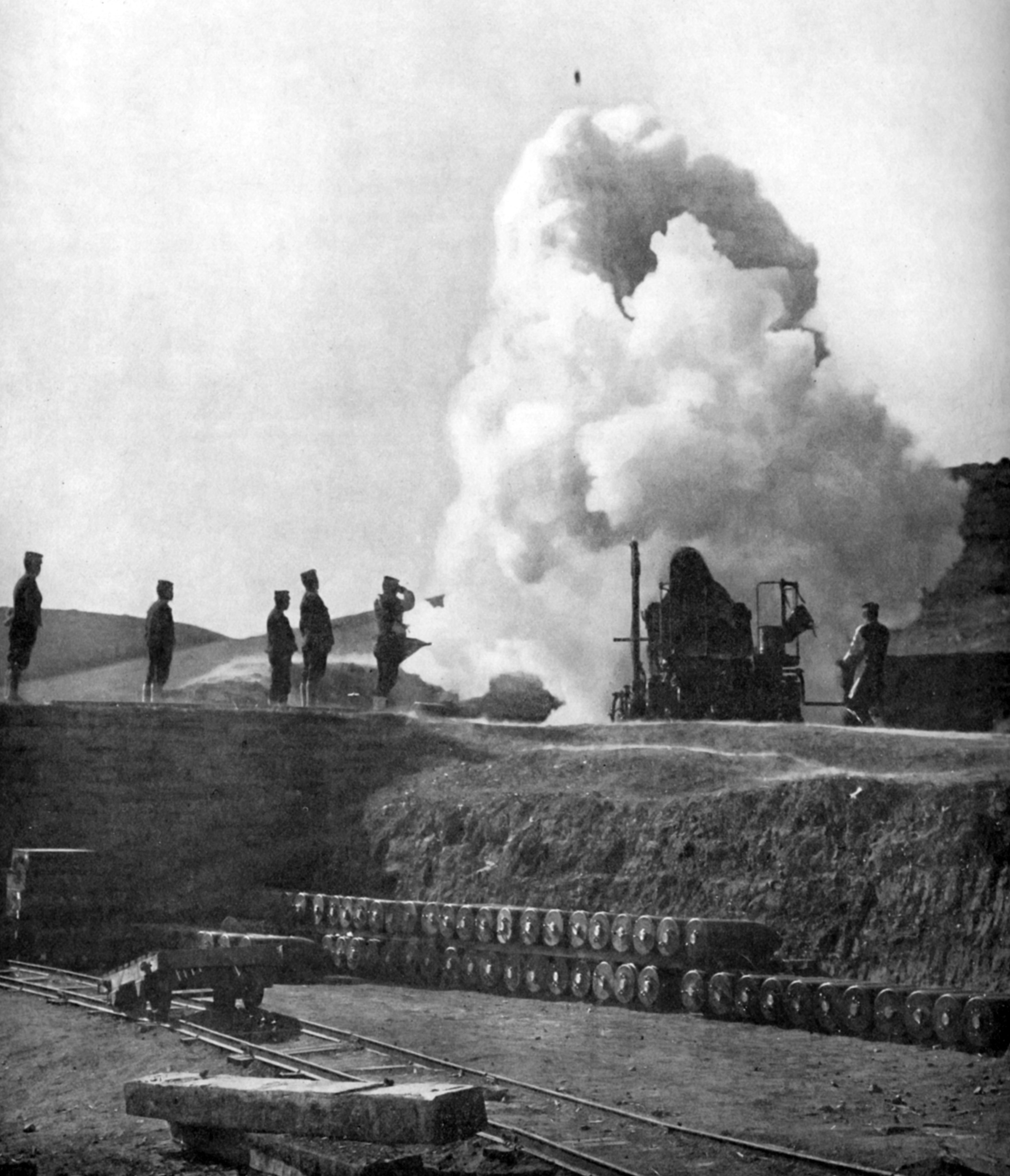
Japanese 11-inch howitzer firing; shell visible in flight

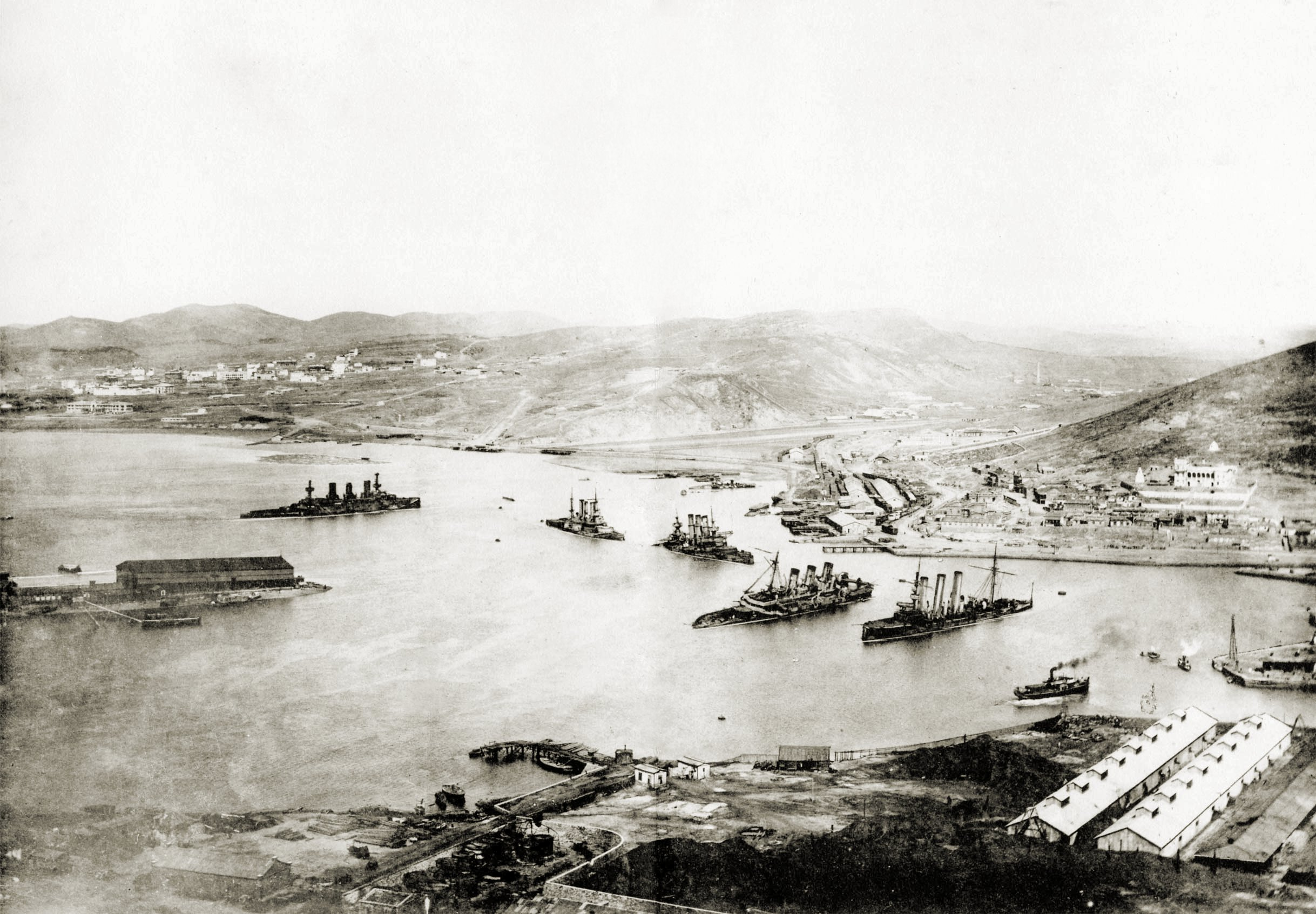
Wrecked ships of the Russian Pacific Fleet; from left to right: Peresvet, Poltava, Retvizan, Pobeda, and Pallada.

With a spotter on a phone line at the vantage point on 203 Meter Hill overlooking Port Arthur harbor, Nogi could now bombard the Russian fleet with heavy 11-inch (280 mm) howitzers with 500-pound (230 kg) armor-piercing shells. He started systematically sinking the Russian ships within range.

On December 5, 1904, the battleship Poltava was sunk, followed by the battleship Retvizan two days later, and the battleships Pobeda and Peresvet and the cruisers Pallada and Bayan on December 9. The battleship Sevastopol, although hit five times by the howitzer shells, managed to move out of range of the guns. Stung by the Russian Pacific Fleet having been sunk by the army and not by the Imperial Japanese Navy, and with a direct order from Tokyo that Sevastopol was not to be allowed to escape, Admiral Togo sent in wave after wave of destroyers in six separate attacks on the sole remaining Russian battleship. After 3 weeks, Sevastopol was still afloat, having survived 124 torpedoes fired at her while sinking two Japanese destroyers and damaging six other vessels. The Japanese had meanwhile lost the cruiser Takasago to a mine outside the harbor.

On the night of January 2, 1905, after Port Arthur surrendered, Captain Nikolai Essen of Sevastopol had the crippled battleship scuttled in 30 fathoms (55 m) of water by opening the sea cocks on one side, so that the ship would sink on its side and could not be raised and salvaged by the Japanese. The other six ships were eventually raised and recommissioned into the Imperial Japanese Navy.

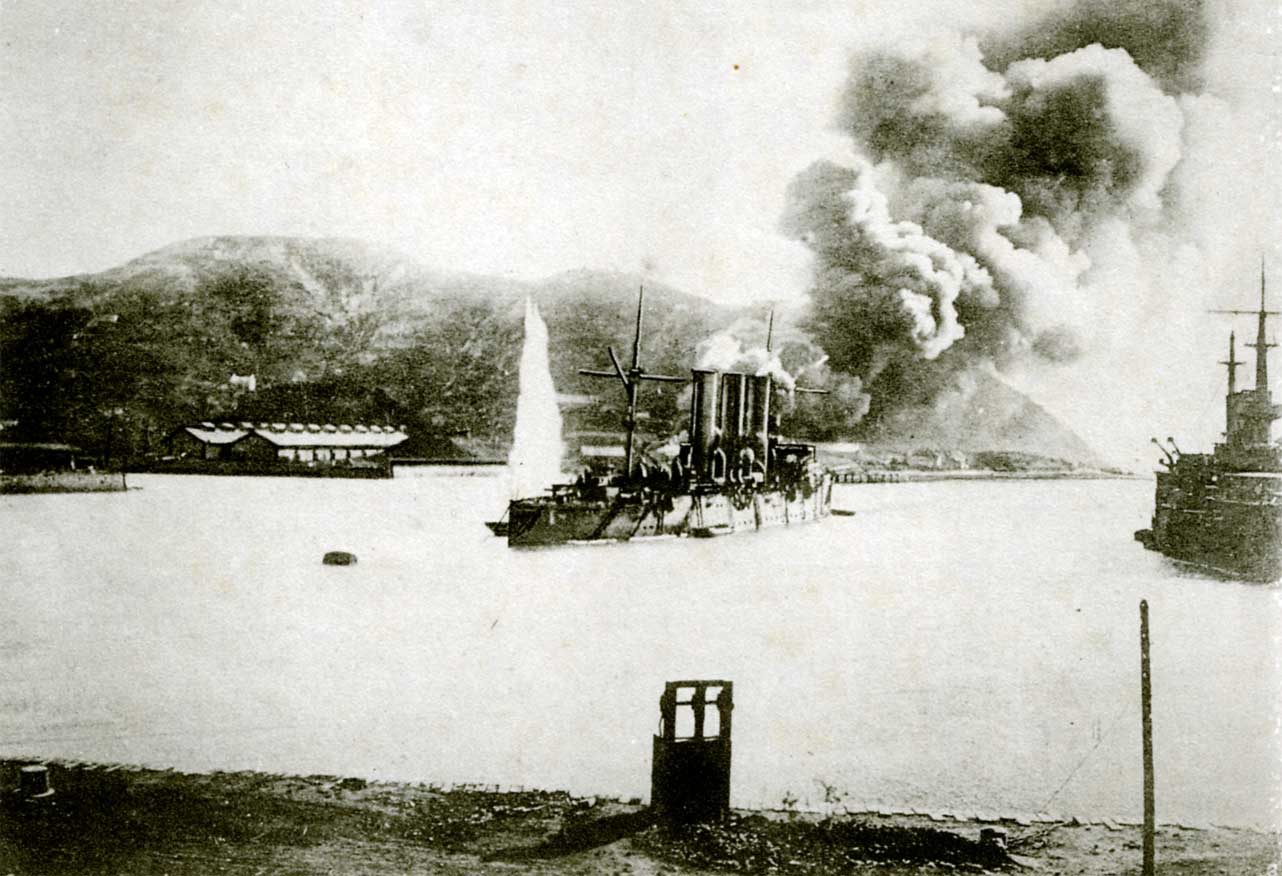
Pallada under fire as the Oil Depot burns

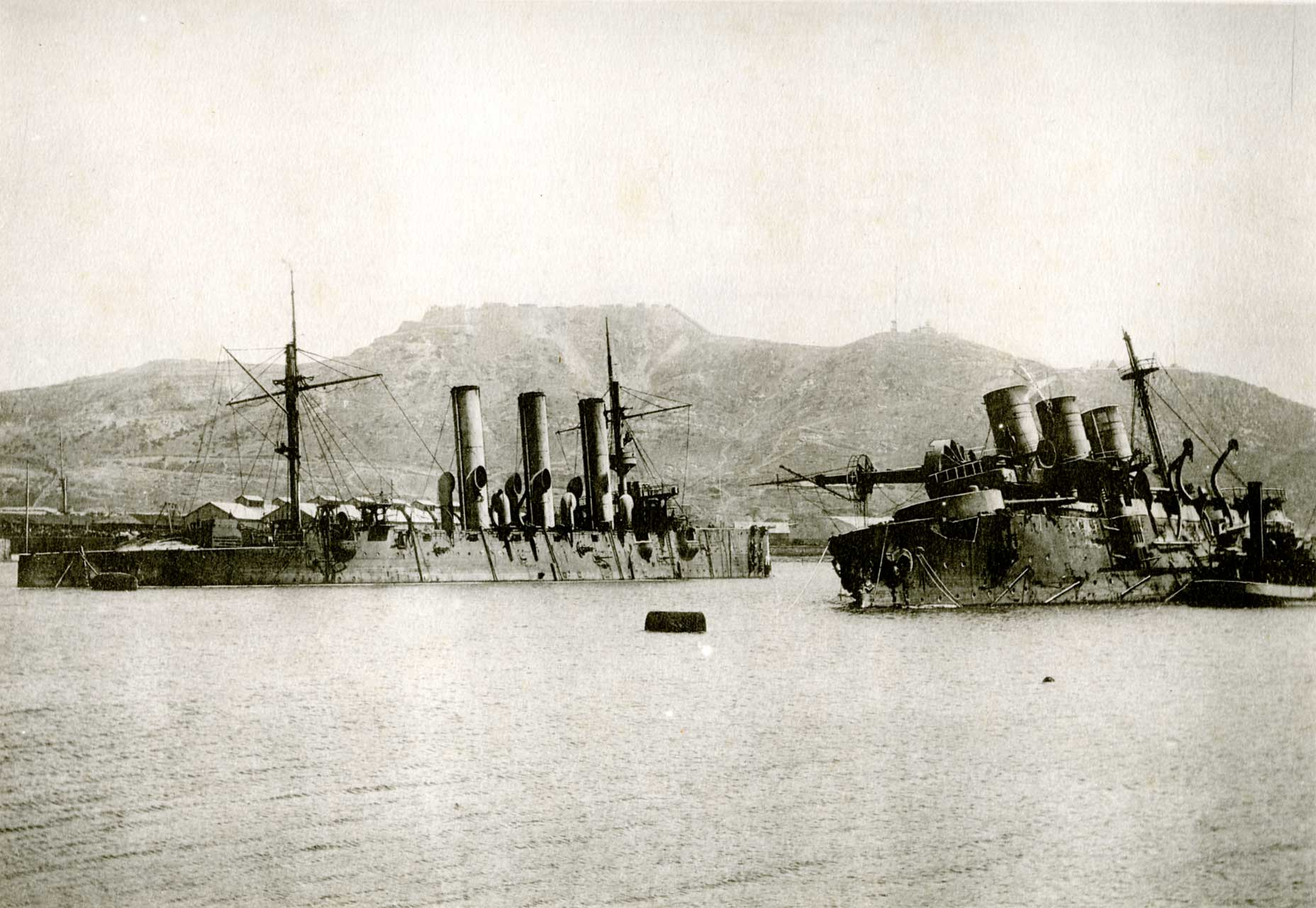
Pallada and Pobeda

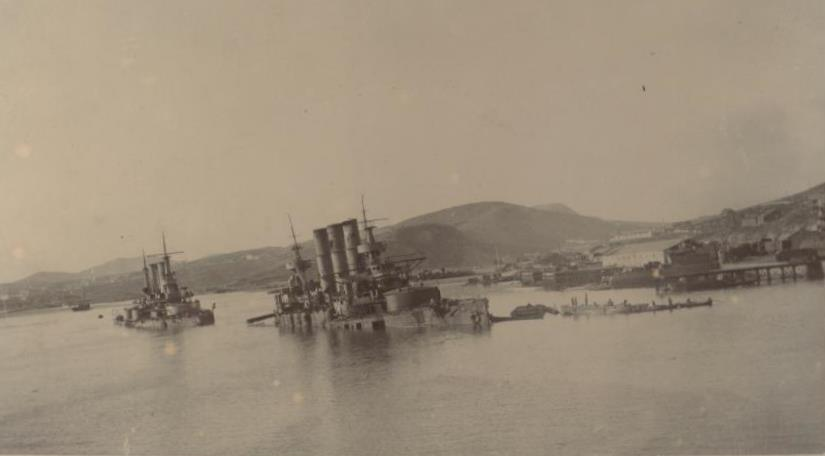
Poltava and Retvizan

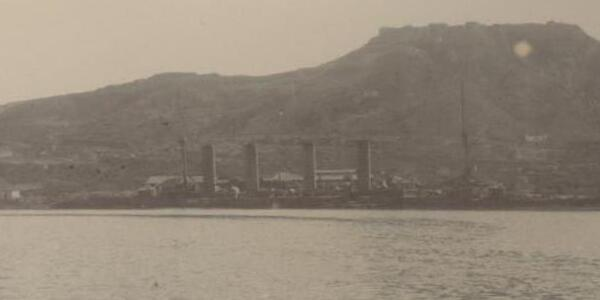
Bayan

=== Surrender ===
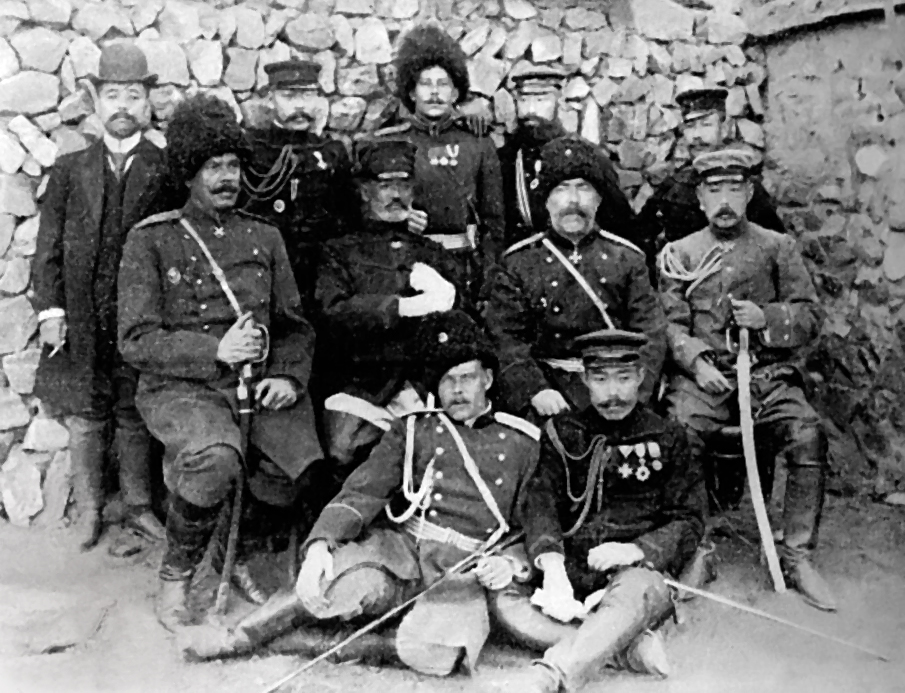
Nogi (Center left), Stoessel (Center right) and their staffs.

Following the loss of the Pacific Fleet, the rationale for holding onto Port Arthur was questioned by Stoessel and Alexander Fok in a council on December 8, 1904, but the idea of surrender was rejected by the other senior officers. Japanese trench and tunnel warfare continued. With the death of General Kondratenko on December 15, 1904, at Fort Tongchikuan, Stoessel appointed the incompetent Fok in his place. On December 18, 1904, the Japanese exploded an 1,800-kilogram (3,968-pound) mine under Fort Chikuan, which fell that night. On December 28, 1904, Fort Erhlung was also undermined and destroyed.

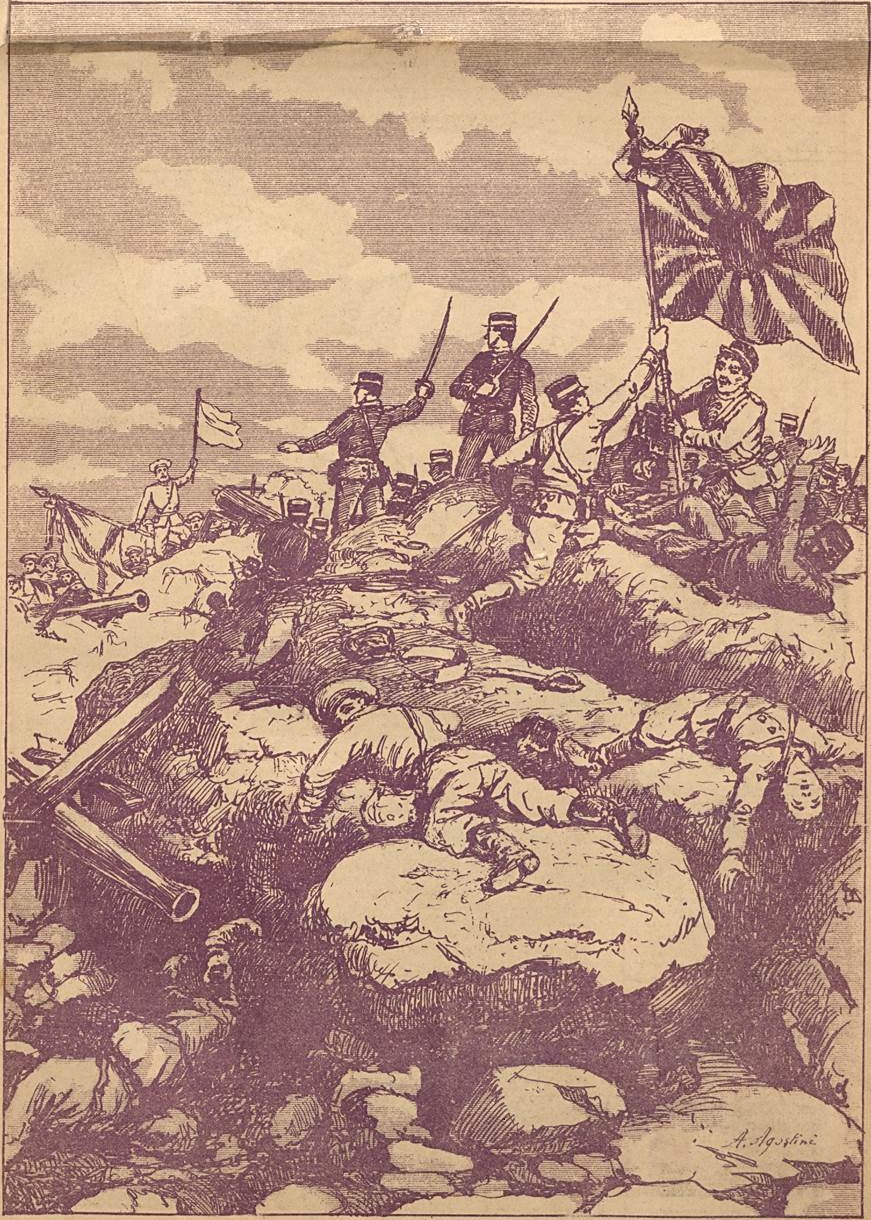
The Surrender of Port Arthur (Angelo Agostini, O Malho, 1905).

On December 31, 1904, a series of mines were exploded under Fort Sungshu, the sole surviving major fortress, which surrendered that day. On January 1, 1905, Wantai finally fell to the Japanese. On the same day, Stoessel and Fok sent a message to a surprised General Nogi, offering to surrender. None of the other senior Russian staff had been consulted, and notably Smirnov and Tretyakov were outraged. The surrender was accepted and signed on January 5, 1905, in the northern suburb of Shuishiying.

With this, the Russian garrison was taken into captivity. Civilians were allowed to leave, and the Russian officers were given the choice of either going into prisoner-of-war camps with their men or being given parole conditional on taking no further part in the war.

The Japanese were astounded to find that a huge store of food and ammunition remained in Port Arthur, which implied that Stoessel had surrendered while still able to hold out for a long time. Stoessel, Fok and Smirnov were court-martialed on their return to St Petersburg.

Nogi, after leaving a garrison in Port Arthur, led the surviving bulk of his army of 120,000 men north to join Marshal Oyama at the Battle of Mukden.

=== Losses ===
Russian land forces in the course of the siege suffered 31,306 casualties, of whom at least 6,000 were killed. Lower figures such as 15,000 killed, wounded, and missing are sometimes claimed. At the end of the siege, the Japanese captured a further 878 army officers and 23,491 other ranks; 15,000 of those captured were wounded. The Japanese also captured 546 guns and 82,000 artillery shells. In addition the Russians lost their entire fleet based at Port Arthur, which was either sunk or interned. The Japanese captured 8,956 seamen.

The Japanese army casualties were later officially listed as 57,780 casualties (killed, wounded and missing), of whom 14,000 were killed. In addition 33,769 became sick during the siege (including 21,023 with beriberi). The Japanese navy lost 16 ships in the course of the siege, including two battleships and four cruisers.

There were higher estimates of Japanese army casualties at the time, such as 94,000-110,000 killed, wounded, and missing, though these were written without access to the Japanese Medical History of the War.

== Aftermath ==
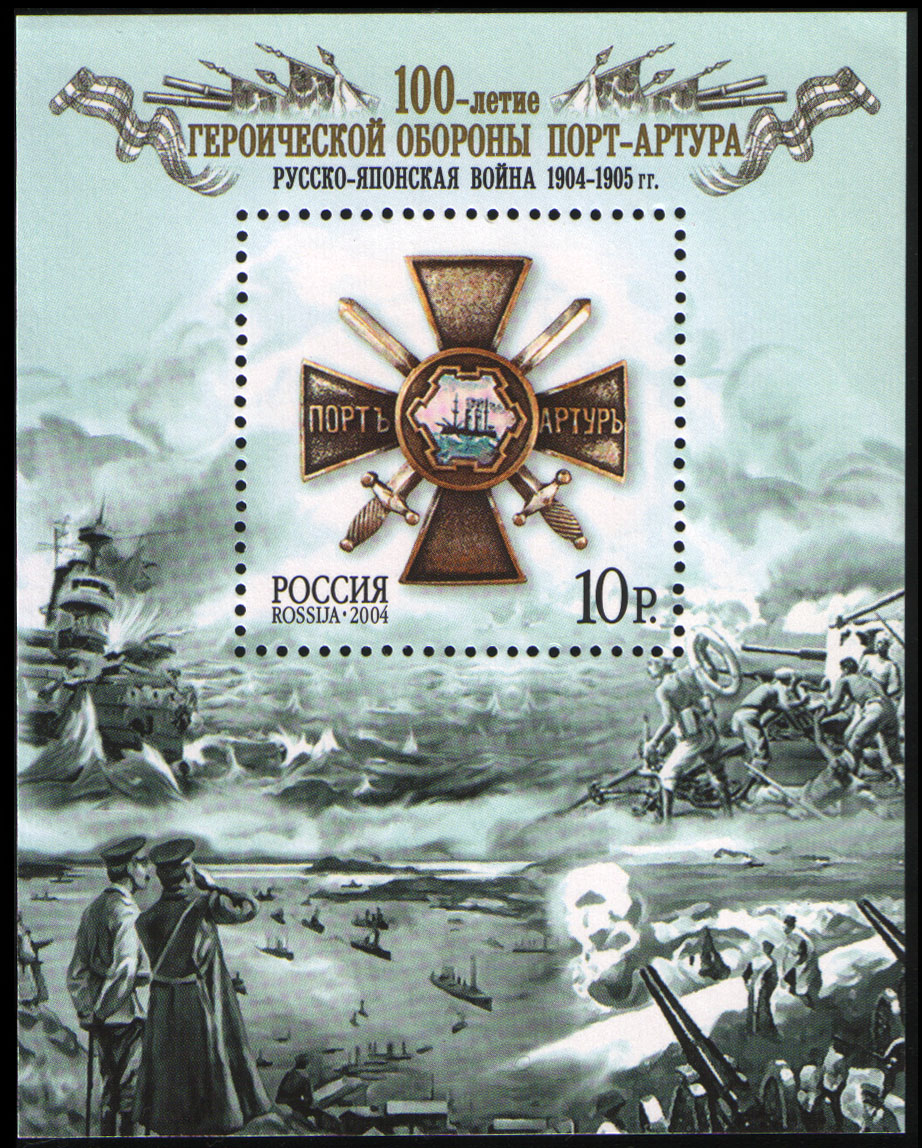
2004 Russian stamp "100th anniversary of the heroic defence of Port Arthur" showing the military decoration, the Port Arthur Cross

The capture of Port Arthur and the subsequent Japanese victories at the Battle of Mukden and Tsushima gave Japan a dominant military position, resulting in favorable arbitration by U.S. President Theodore Roosevelt in the Treaty of Portsmouth, which ended the war. The loss of the war in 1905 led to major political unrest in Imperial Russia (see: Russian Revolution of 1905).

At the end of the war, Nogi made a report directly to Emperor Meiji during a Gozen Kaigi. When explaining battles of the siege of Port Arthur in detail, he broke down and wept, apologizing for the 56,000 lives lost in that campaign and asking to be allowed to kill himself in atonement. Emperor Meiji told him that suicide was unacceptable, as all responsibility for the war was due to imperial orders, and that Nogi must remain alive, at least as long as the emperor himself lived. Nogi and his wife Shizuko committed suicide by seppuku shortly after the Emperor Meiji's funeral cortege left the imperial palace on 13 September 1912.

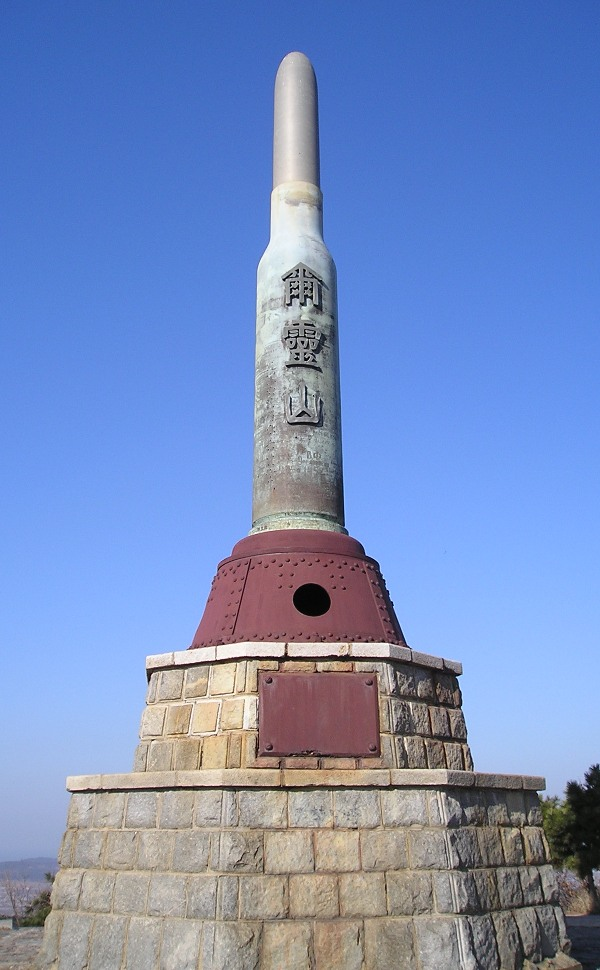
Surviving monument on Hill 203, depicting a Japanese 8x53mmR Murata cartridge

== Assessment ==
It was generally assumed at the time that Nogi's victory came at the cost of far more Japanese lives than necessary due to his preference for direct infantry assaults on the Russian positions. "I have no excuse ... for this unscientific, unstrategical campaign of brute force," he wrote then-Army Minister Terauchi Masatake afterwards. Ellis Ashmead-Bartlett, who covered the siege in his journalistic capacity, shared the views of British military observers when he wrote that "the lives lost in August, October and November were for the most part thrown away to absolutely no purpose ... the same result would have been obtained if no assaults had been delivered until the middle of December" when the tunnelling and sapping, hampered by cooler temperatures, was complete. Another British war correspondent noted that Nogi, along with many of his troops, was too impatient to wait that long and so preferred the assaults.

Hebrew University of Jerusalem military historian Danny Orbach made Nogi the subject of his contribution to the 2022 book The Worst Leaders in Military History. He grants that Nogi did not have the best situation, due to factors beyond his control such as inadequate intelligence, inadequate knowledge of modern siege warfare techniques and tactics on the part of the Japanese officer corps generally, incompetent junior staff, inefficient allocation of armaments and ammunition early in the battle, and pressure from above to take Port Arthur as quickly as possible. But Orbach finds the blinkered strategic understanding that led Nogi, as much as his superiors in the General Staff, to rigidly commit to the letter of his orders to take Port Arthur. Had Nogi been more imaginative in understanding his orders, he would not have needed Kodama's visit to draw his attention to how taking 203-Meter-Hill would make it possible to sink the Pacific Fleet without having to take the city. Even after the General Staff came around to this realization, it still took some time for them to persuade Nogi he should take this course. By the time he began to, in December, Russian fortifications on the hill had been greatly strengthened.

More recently, Japanese historian Chōnan Masayoshi has defended Nogi. In work drawing on the papers of Nogi's staff officers from the siege, he argues that Nogi was not free to loosely reinterpret his orders, and that the fortress was more heavily defended on its western side, making the northeast approach to it more sensible. Orbach responds that even if that were assumed to have been so, Nogi was still irresponsible to have ordered three assaults before the sapping and tunneling was complete, as he had to know they were unlikely to penetrate Russian defenses.
