= Port Arthur Cross =

Campaign medal of the Russian Empire

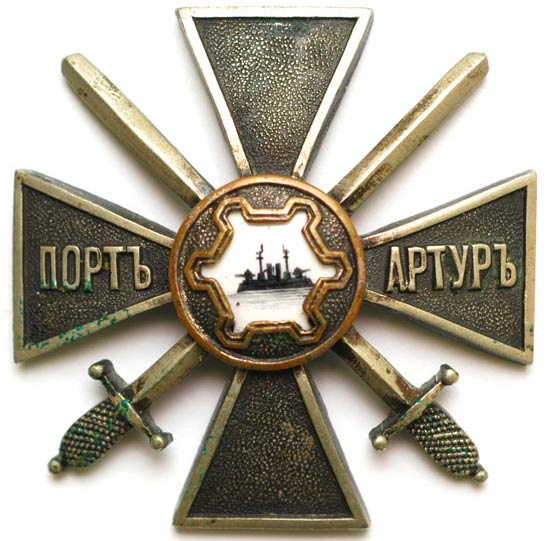
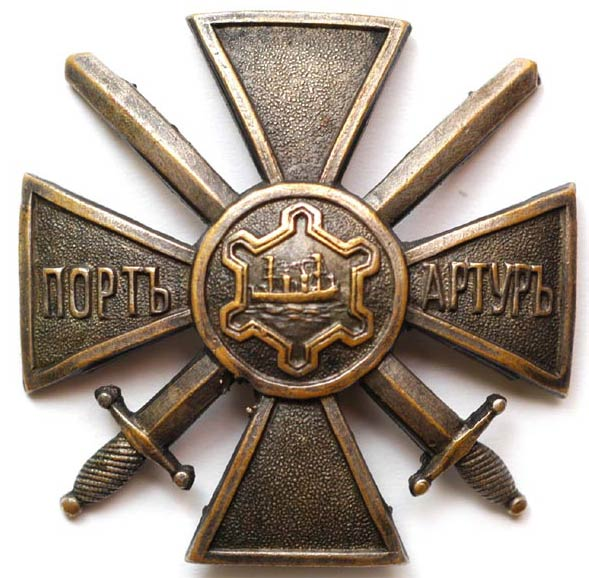
- Officers' issue Other ranks' issue Two variants of the Port Arthur Cross: silver for officers (left) and bronze for enlisted ranks (right)
- Native name: Крест «За Порт-Артур»
- Type: Campaign medal
- Awarded for: Participation in the defense of the fortress during the Siege of Port Arthur
- Country: Russian Empire
- Presented by: Russian Empire
- Eligibility: Russian Army and Navy personnel who participated in the defense of Port Arthur }}
- Campaign: Russo-Japanese War
- Established: 14 January 1914

The Port Arthur Cross or Cross "For the Defence of Port Arthur" (Russian: крест «За Порт-Артур») was a campaign medal awarded by the Russian Empire. It was instituted on 14 January 1914 to mark the tenth anniversary of the siege of Port Arthur. It was awarded in silver to officers and in bronze to the other ranks.

The ends of the cross are broad in the manner of the Cross of St. George, with crossed swords in the centre with their points upwards, with a black battleship silhouette on a white enamel background at the centre on the silver issue and engraved on the bronze issue. On the left arm is "ПОРТЪ" ("PORT") and on the right arm is "АРТУРЪ" ("ARTHUR"). The reverse has a pin for attaching it to clothing.
